= Tarja Turunen discography =

Artist discography

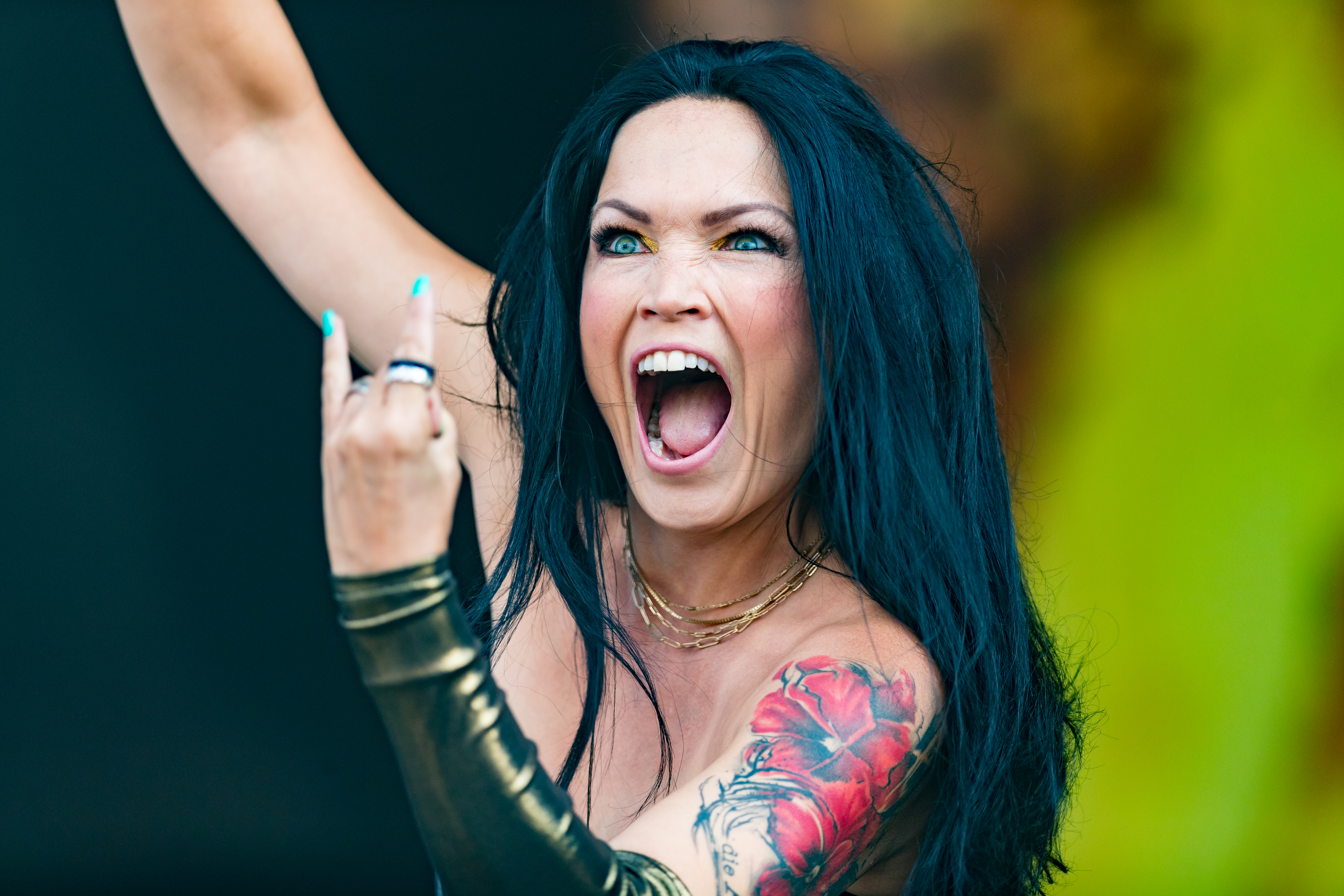
- Turunen live in 2022
- Studio albums: 10
- Extended plays: 5
- Live albums: 8
- Compilation albums: 1
- Singles: 50
- Video albums: 6
- Music videos: 50

This is the solo discography of Finnish singer Tarja Turunen, who rose to prominence as the lead vocalist of symphonic metal band Nightwish, which she founded in 1996 and was dismissed from in 2005 after releasing five studio albums, three live albums and one EP between 1997 and 2004 (for further information see Nightwish discography).

In 2004 Tarja had already released an independent single, "Yhden enkelin unelma", and played a few headlining Christmas shows in Europe in late 2005, thus officially launching her solo career in 2006 with a Christmas album called Henkäys ikuisuudesta, followed in 2007 by her first rock album, My Winter Storm, accompanied by the "I Walk Alone" single, a minor hit in Europe. Since then, she's been keeping a steady routine of albums production and touring, not only as a solo rock artist, with a total of five rock albums so far (the most recent being In the Raw in 2019), but also venturing into diverse styles as classical music territory, which is her official music formation, also often putting out albums and playing live tours regarding Christmas celebrations. (see Ave Maria – En Plein Air from 2015 and Score for a Dark Christmas from 2017 as examples).

On 2 December 2022, Tarja released her first compilation album, Best of: Living the Dream in many formats to celebrate her 15-year solo career. She later announced the beginning of The Greatest Hits Tour in support of the compilation album, starting in the United States, with further dates already scheduled into early 2025. On 23 June 2023, Tarja and EDM producer Torsten Stenzel released their self-titled debut studio project under the moniker of Outlanders, mixing rock, electronic and several other music styles, with songs and official videos for each track made available on Spotify and YouTube throughout the year, a project that had been in the making since 2010. Turunen released Dark Christmas in 2023 and the song "Left on Mars" with Marko Hietala in 2024. Her latest studio rock album, Frisson Noir, came out in June 2026.

As of June 2026, Turunen has put out ten studio albums, eight live albums, five EPs and fifty lead and promotional singles.

== Studio albums ==
=== Rock albums ===
Title	Album details	Peak chart positions									Certifications
Title	Album details	FIN	AUT	BEL (Wa)	CZE	FRA	GER	POL	SWI	UK Rock	Certifications
My Winter Storm	Released: 14 November 2007; Label: Universal Music, Vertigo; Format: CD, LP, digital download	1	11	94	33	88	3	—	15	8	IFPI FIN: Platinum; IFPI CZE: Gold; BVMI: Gold; NFPF (Russia): Gold
What Lies Beneath	Released: 1 September 2010; Label: Spinefarm, Universal Music, The End, Vertigo; Format: CD, LP, digital download	7	12	38	6	—	4	28	11	11	
Colours in the Dark	Released: 30 August 2013; Label: Earmusic; Format: CD, LP, digital download	5	14	33	7	54	6	8	20	10	IFPI CZE: Gold
The Shadow Self	Released: 5 August 2016; Label: Earmusic; Format: CD, LP, digital download	19	37	39	3	75	7	—	11	8	NFPF (Russia): Gold
In the Raw	Released: 30 August 2019; Label: Earmusic; Format: CD, LP, digital download	30	60	60	57	88	15	37	12	3	
Frisson Noir	Released: 12 June 2026; Label: Earmusic; Format: CD, LP, digital download	14	21	95	35	184	12	29	14	6	
"—" denotes releases that did not chart or was not released.

=== Classical albums ===
Title	Album details	Peak chart positions		
Title	Album details	FIN	BEL (FL)	BEL (WA)
Ave Maria – En Plein Air	Released: 11 September 2015; Label: Earmusic; Format: CD, LP, digital download	31	165	159

=== Christmas albums ===
Title	Album details	Peak chart positions								Certifications
Title	Album details	FIN	AUT	CZE	GER	NLD	SWI	UK Indie	US Heat	Certifications
Henkäys ikuisuudesta	Released: 8 November 2006; Label: Universal Music; Format: CD, LP	2	—	—	—	—	—	—	—	IFPI FIN: 2× Platinum
From Spirits and Ghosts	Released: 17 November 2017; Label: Earmusic; Format: CD, LP, digital download	32	50	30	40	196	68	7	12	
Dark Christmas	Released: 10 November 2023; Label: Earmusic; Format: CD, LP, digital download	9	59	—	39	—	—	15	—	

=== Collaborative albums ===
Title	Album details	Tracks	Collaborators
Outlanders (with Torsten Stenzel)	Released: 23 June 2023; Recorded in several locations and dates from 2010 to 2023; Turunen provided all vocals, Torsten recorded and keyboards and Electronic sounds, with 10 different musicians adding guitars; Label: Earmusic; Format: CD, LP, digital download	1. Outlanders; 2. Closer to the Sky; 3. The Cruellest Goodbye; 4. World in My Eyes; 5. Mystique Voyage; 6. The Sleeping Indian; 7. Land of Sea and Sun; 8. 1971; 9. We Own This Sky; 10. Never Too Far; 11. Echoes; 12. A Peaceful Place (Return to the Oasis)	1. Walter Giardino (#1, #8 and #12); 2. Trevor Rabin (#2); 3. Al Di Meola (#3); 4. Vernon Reid (#4); 5. Steve Rothery (#5); 6. Joe Satriani (#6); 7. Marty Friedman (#7); 8. Ron "Bumblefoot" Thal (#9); 9. Mike Oldfield (#10); 10. Jennifer Batten (#11)

== Live albums ==
Title	Album details	Peak chart positions							
Title	Album details	FIN	AUT	BEL (FL)	BEL (WA)	CZE	GER	SWI	UK Rock
Noche Escandinava II	Released: 2005; Label: NEMS; Format: CD, LP, digital download	Limited to 500 copies in Argentina.							
In Concert – Live at Sibelius Hall	Released: 17 November 2011; Recorded: 7 December 2009 in Lahti, Finland; Label: Earmusic; Format: CD, DVD, LP, digital download	37	—	—	—	—	—	—	—
Act I: Live in Rosario	Released: 24 August 2012; Recorded: 30-31 March 2012 in Rosario, Argentina; Label: Universal Music, Earmusic; Format: CD, DVD, LP, digital download	12	36	99	82	—	5	48	—
Beauty and the Beat	Released: 30 May 2014; Recorded: 4–6 April 2013 in Zlín, Czech Republic; Label: Earmusic; Format: CD, DVD, digital download	—	—	—	148	—	67	—	—
Luna Park Ride	Released: 29 May 2015; Recorded: 27 March 2011 in Buenos Aires, Argentina; Label: Universal Music, Earmusic; Format: CD, DVD, LP, digital download	—	—	176	114	24	55	—	—
Act II	Released: 27 July 2018; Recorded: 29 November 2016 in Milan, Italy; Label: Earmusic; Format: CD, LP, DVD, digital download	33	—	80	116	47	17	17	17
Christmas Together: Live at Olomouc and Hradec Králové 2019	Released: 27 November 2020; Label: Earmusic; Format: CD, LP, digital download	Included as part of the 2020 reissue of the From Spirits and Ghosts album.							
Rocking Heels: Live at Metal Church	Released: 11 August 2023; Recorded: 3 August 2016 in Wacken, Germany; Label: Earmusic; Format: CD, LP, digital download	—	—	—	—	—	86	—	22
Circus Life	Released: 16 May 2025; Recorded: Label: Earmusic; Format:	—	—	—	—	—	—	—	—
"—" denotes releases that did not chart or was not released.

== Video albums ==
Title	Album details	Peak chart positions						
Title	Album details	FIN	AUT	BEL (FL)	BEL (WA)	NLD	SWI	UK Rock
In Concert – Live at Sibelius Hall	Released: 17 November 2011; Label: Earmusic; Format: DVD, Blu-ray	7	—	—	—	—	—	—
Act I: Live in Rosario	Released: 24 August 2012; Recorded: 30–31 March 2012 in Rosario, Argentina; Label: Universal Music, Earmusic; Format: CD, DVD, LP, digital download	1	3	7	2	4	2	16
Beauty and the Beat	Released: 30 May 2014; Recorded: 4–6 April 2013 in Zlín, Czech Republic; Label: Earmusic; Format: CD, DVD, digital download	2	4	—	7	21	5	—
Luna Park Ride	Released: 29 May 2015; Recorded: 29 March 2011 in Buenos Aires; Label: Universal Music, Earmusic; Format: CD, DVD, LP, digital download	1	4	—	5	5	3	11
Act II	Released: 27 July 2018; Recorded: 29 November 2016 in Milan, Italy; Label: Earmusic; Format: CD, LP, DVD, digital download	6	2	—	—	2	1	4
Circus Life	Released: 16 May 2025; Recorded: 23 January 2020 in Bucharest, Romania; Label: Earmusic; Format: CD, LP, DVD, digital download	—	—	—	—	—	—	1
"—" denotes releases that did not chart or was not released.

== Compilations ==
Title	Album details	Peak chart positions		
Title	Album details	FIN	GER	UK Rock
Best of: Living the Dream	Released: 2 December 2022; Label: Earmusic; Format: CD, LP, digital download	8	41	11

== Extended plays ==
Title	Album details	Peak chart positions							
Title	Album details	FIN	AUT	BEL	CZE	FRA	GER	SWI	UK Rock
Yhden enkelin unelma	Released: 1 December 2004; Label: Universal Music; Format: MCD	1	—	—	—	—	—	—	—
The Seer	Released: 1 December 2008; Label: Spinefarm; Format: LP	Limited to 1000 copies in the United Kingdom.							
Left in the Dark	Released: 4 July 2014; Label: Edel; Format: LP, digital download	Available only as part of the Colours in the Dark limited box set edition.							
The Brightest Void	Released: 3 June 2017; Label: Earmusic; Format: CD, LP, digital download	25	55	80	11	99	41	35	9
Extra Raw	Released: 8 May 2020; Label: Earmusic; Format: CD, LP, digital download	Available only as part of the In the Raw limited box set edition.							

== Singles ==
=== As lead artist ===
Title	Year	Peak chart positions						Album
Title	Year	FIN	AUT	CZE Rock	GER	SWI	UK Rock	Album
"Yhden enkelin unelma"	2004	1	—	—	—	—	—	Henkäys Ikuisuudesta
"You Would Have Loved This"	2006	5	—	—	—	—	—	Henkäys Ikuisuudesta
"Happy New Year"	2006	—	—	—	—	—	—	Henkäys Ikuisuudesta
"I Walk Alone"	2007	6	37	—	16	49	—	My Winter Storm
"Die Alive"	2008	—	—	—	76	—	—	My Winter Storm
"Enough"	2009	—	—	—	—	—	—	My Winter Storm
"Falling Awake"	2010	—	—	—	—	—	52	What Lies Beneath
"I Feel Immortal"	2010	—	—	—	55	—	—	What Lies Beneath
"Until My Last Breath"	2010	—	—	—	—	—	—	What Lies Beneath
"Underneath"	2011	—	—	—	—	—	—	What Lies Beneath
"Walking in the Air"	2011	—	—	—	—	—	—	In Concert
"Into the Sun"	2012	—	—	—	—	—	—	Act I
"Victim of Ritual"	2013	—	—	—	—	—	12	Colours in the Dark
"500 Letters"	2013	—	—	4	—	—	—	Colours in the Dark
"Never Enough"	2015	—	—	—	—	—	—	Luna Park Ride
"No Bitter End"	2016	—	—	6	—	—	—	The Shadow Self
"Innocence"	2016	—	—	17	—	—	—	The Shadow Self
"Demons in You" (featuring Alissa White-Gluz)	2016	—	—	12	—	—	46	The Shadow Self
"An Empty Dream"	2017	—	—	—	—	—	—	The Brightest Void
"O Come, O Come, Emmanuel"	2017	—	—	—	—	—	—	From Spirits and Ghosts (Score for a Dark Christmas)
"O Tannenbaum"	2017	—	—	—	—	—	—	From Spirits and Ghosts (Score for a Dark Christmas)
"Feliz Navidad"	2017	—	—	—	—	—	—	From Spirits and Ghosts (Score for a Dark Christmas)
"Love to Hate"	2018	—	—	—	—	—	—	Act II
"Undertaker"	2018	—	—	—	—	—	—	Act II
"Dead Promises"	2019	—	—	—	—	—	—	In the Raw
"Railroads"	2019	—	—	—	—	—	—	In the Raw
"Tears in Rain"	2019	—	—	4	—	—	—	In the Raw
"You and I"	2019	—	—	—	—	—	—	In the Raw
"Together"	2020	—	—	—	—	—	—	Christmas Together: Live at Olomouc and Hradec Králové 2019
"Have Yourself a Merry Little Christmas"	2020	—	—	—	—	—	—	Christmas Together: Live at Olomouc and Hradec Králové 2019
"Closer to the Sky"	2021	—	—	—	—	—	—	Outlanders
"The Cruellest Goodbye"	2022	—	—	—	—	—	—	Outlanders
"World in My Eyes"	2022	—	—	—	—	—	—	Outlanders
"The Sleeping Indian"	2022	—	—	—	—	—	—	Outlanders
"Land of Sea and Sun"	2022	—	—	—	—	—	—	Outlanders
"Eye of the Storm"	2022	—	—	—	—	—	—	Best of: Living the Dream
"We Own This Sky"	2023	—	—	—	—	—	—	Outlanders
"Echoes"	2023	—	—	—	—	—	—	Outlanders
"A Peaceful Place (Return to the Oasis)"	2023	—	—	—	—	—	—	Outlanders
"Mystique Voyage"	2023	—	—	—	—	—	—	Outlanders
"1971"	2023	—	—	—	—	—	—	Outlanders
"Never Too Far"	2023	—	—	—	—	—	—	Outlanders
"Numb"	2023	—	—	—	—	—	—	Rocking Heels: Live at Metal Church
"Alias"	2023	—	—	—	—	—	—	Rocking Heels: Live at Metal Church
"The Unforgiven"	2023	—	—	—	—	—	—	Rocking Heels: Live at Metal Church
"Outlanders"	2023	—	—	—	—	—	—	Outlanders
"Frosty the Snowman"	2023	—	—	—	—	—	—	Dark Christmas
"Jingle Bells"	2023	—	—	—	—	—	—	Dark Christmas
"All I Want for Christmas Is You"	2023	—	—	—	—	—	—	Dark Christmas
"Dark Star"	2024	—	—	—	—	—	—	What Lies Beneath (2024 re-issue)
"—" denotes releases that did not chart or was not released.

=== As a featured artist ===
Title	Year	Peak chart positions				Album
Title	Year	AUT	GER	NLD	SWI	Album
"Leaving You for Me" (with Martin Kesici)	2005	44	44	—	46	So What...?!
"Walking with the Angels" (with Doro Pesch)	2009	51	11	—	56	Fear No Evil
"The Good Die Young" (with Scorpions)	2010	—	—	—	—	Sting in the Tail
"Paradise (What About Us?)" (with Within Temptation)	2013	—	81	80	64	Hydra
"Left on Mars" (with Marko Hietala)	2024	—	—	—	—	Non album single

== Music videos ==
=== As lead artist ===
Year	Song	Director
2007	"I Walk Alone"	Jörn Heitmann
2008	"Die Alive"	Uwe Flade
2010	"Falling Awake"	Footage video
2010	"I Feel Immortal"	Jörn Heitmann
2010	"Until My Last Breath"	Jörn Heitmann
2010	"Until My Last Breath II"	Jörn Heitmann
2011	"Walking in the Air"	Live video
2012	"Into the Sun"	Live video
2013	"Never Enough"	Lyric video
2013	"Victim of Ritual"	Florian Kaltenbach
2013	"500 Letters"	Florian Kaltenbach
2015	"Ave Maria"	Live video
2016	"No Bitter End"	Mariano Cattaneotrailer
2016	"Innocence"	Mariano Cattaneotrailer
2017	"O Come, O Come, Emmanuel"	Carlos Caceres Lavergne
2017	"O Tannenbaum"	Carlos Caceres Lavergne
2017	"Feliz Navidad"	Carlos Caceres Lavergne
2018	"Love to Hate"	Live video
2018	"Undertaker"	Live video
2019	"Dead Promises"	Lyric video
2019	"Railroads"	Fan Footage video
2019	"Tears in Rain"	Florian Kaltenbach
2020	"Together"	Live video
2020	"Have Yourself a Merry Little Christmas"	Live video
2022	"Eye of the Storm"	Lyric video
2022	"Closer to the Sky"	Torsten Stenzel
2022	"The Cruellest Goodbye"	Torsten Stenzel
2022	"World in My Eyes"	Torsten Stenzel
2022	"The Sleeping Indian"	Torsten Stenzel
2022	"Land of Sea and Sun"	Torsten Stenzel
2023	"Numb"	Live video
2023	"Alias"	Live video
2023	"The Unforgiving"	Live video
2023	"A peaceful place (Return to the Oasis)"	Torsten Stenzel
2023	"Mystique Voyage"	Torsten Stenzel
2023	"1971"	Torsten Stenzel
2023	"Never too far"	Torsten Stenzel
2023	"Outlanders"	Torsten Stenzel
2023	"Frosty the Snowman"	Polish Filming Company Staff
2023	"Jingle Bells"	Polish Filming Company Staff
2023	"Rudolph The Red-Nosed Reindeer"	Polish Filming Company Staff
2023	"White Christmas"	Polish Filming Company Staff
2023	"The First Noel"	Polish Filming Company Staff
2023	"Last Christmas"	Polish Filming Company Staff
2023	"Dark Christmas"	Polish Filming Company Staff
2023	"Wonderful Christmastime"	Polish Filming Company Staff
2023	"O Holy Night"	Polish Filming Company Staff
2023	"All I Want For Christmas Is You"	Polish Filming Company Staff
2023	"Jingle Bell Rock"	Polish Filming Company Staff
2023	"Angels We Have Heard On High"	Polish Filming Company Staff

=== Other ===
Year	Song	Director	Note
2005	"Leaving You for Me"	—N/a	Collaboration with Martin Kesici
2013	"Paradise (What About Us?)"	Maarten Welzen & Tim Smit	Collaboration with Within Temptation
2013	"Stand Away" (Angra feat. Tarja Turunen)	—N/a	Angra : Angels Cry 20th Anniversary Tour
2015	"An Empty Dream"	Mariano Cattaneo	Theme song for the Argentinian movie "Corazon Muerto" (Dead Heart)
2016	"Zu zweit allein" (Schandmaul feat. Tarja Turunen)	—N/a	Leuchtfeuer
2021	"I Will Be Gone" (Primal Fear feat. Tarja Turunen)	—N/a	I Will Be Gone EP
2024	"Left On Mars" (with Marko Hietala)	Ville Lipiäinen	—N/a
2024	"Angels" (Tour Promotion Song)	—N/a	—N/a

== Collaborations ==
Year	Participation	Album
1995	"Fine Knacks For Ladies" (Savonlinnan Taidelukion – Savonlinna Secondary School of Arts and Music – feat. Tarja Turunen)	Romeo Ja Julia
1995	"Lady Night" (Savonlinnan Taidelukion – Savonlinna Secondary School of Arts and Music – feat. Tarja Turunen)	Romeo Ja Julia
1995	"Viimeinen Mahdollisuus" (Savonlinnan Taidelukion – Savonlinna Secondary School of Arts and Music – feat. Tarja Turunen)	Romeo Ja Julia
1995	"Epilogi" (Savonlinnan Taidelukion – Savonlinna Secondary School of Arts and Music – feat. Tarja Turunen)	Romeo Ja Julia
1999	"Part 1 Lost And Found" (Waltari feat. Tarja Turunen)	Evankeliumi
1999	"Part 3 Came From The Prison" (Waltari feat. Tarja Turunen)	Evankeliumi
1999	"Part 4 Be Seeing You" (Waltari feat. Tarja Turunen)	Evankeliumi
1999	"Part 5 Be Seeing You" (Waltari feat. Tarja Turunen)	Evankeliumi
1999	"Part 6 Desert Sun" (Waltari feat. Tarja Turunen)	Evankeliumi
1999	"Part 10 Victory" (Waltari feat. Tarja Turunen)	Evankeliumi
1999	"Part 11 Found" (Waltari feat. Tarja Turunen)	Evankeliumi
2001	"Until Dawn (Angels of Light)" (Beto Vázquez Infinity feat. Tarja Turunen)	Beto Vazquez Infinity
2001	"Wizard" (Beto Vázquez Infinity feat. Tarja Turunen and Sabine Edelsbacher)	Beto Vazquez Infinity
2001	"Sadness in the Night" (Beto Vázquez Infinity feat. Tarja Turunen)	Beto Vazquez Infinity
2001	"The Laws of the Future" (Beto Vázquez Infinity feat. Tarja Turunen and Sabine Edelsbacher)	Beto Vazquez Infinity
2001	"Promises Under the Rain" (Beto Vázquez Infinity feat. Tarja Turunen, Candice Night, Sabine Edelsbacher)	Beto Vazquez Infinity
2001	"Tuulikello" (Anssi Tikanmäen Yhtye feat. Tarja Turunen)	Perinteinen Pop-Levy
2005	"Tired of Being Alone" (Schiller feat. Tarja Turunen)	Tag und Nacht
2005	"Leaving You for Me" (Martin Kesici feat. Tarja Turunen)	So What... ?!
2007	"In the Picture" (Nuclear Blast Allstars feat. Tarja Turunen)	Nuclear Blast All-Stars: Into the Light
2007	"Maamme (Our Land)" (Tapiola Sinfonietta feat. Tarja Turunen)	90th Anniversary of Finland's Independence
2009	"Walking with the Angels" (Doro feat. Tarja Turunen)	Fear No Evil
2009	"Child in Time" (Rata Blanca feat. Tarja Turunen)	Luna Park Stadium
2009	"Arkihuolesi kaikki heitä"	Maailman Jauneimmat Joululaulut (finnish Christmas álbum)
2009	"Heinillä härkien"	Maailman Jauneimmat Joululaulut (finnish Christmas álbum)
2009	"Maa on niin kaunis"	Maailman Jauneimmat Joululaulut (finnish Christmas álbum)
2010	"The Good Die Young" (Scorpions feat. Tarja Turunen)	Sting in the Tail
2013	"Never Too Far" (Mike Oldfield feat. Tarja Turunen)	Tubular Beats
2013	"Paradise (What About Us?)" (Within Temptation feat. Tarja Turunen)	Hydra
2013	"Stand Away" (Angra feat. Tarja Turunen)	Angra : Angels Cry 20th Anniversary Tour
2013	"Wuthering Heights" (Angra feat. Tarja Turunen)	Angra : Angels Cry 20th Anniversary Tour
2015	"Castillos de papel" (Lörihen feat. Tarja Turunen)	Aún sigo latiendo
2015	"An Empty Dream"	Dead Heart movie soundtrack
2016	"Zu zweit allein" (Schandmaul feat. Tarja Turunen)	Leuchtfeuer
2017	"Joulun Rauhaa" (Raskasta Joulua feat. Tarja Turunen)	Raskasta Joulua IV
2017	"Ave Maria" (Marko Hietala feat. Tarja Turunen)	Raskasta Joulua IV
2018	"Let Come Christmas" (Antti Railio, Kimmo Blom feat. Tarja Turunen)	Raskasta Joulua
2018	"Hermandades De Fierro" (Tarja Turunen as Susanna Asspera)	Asspera : Live In Villa La Verga
2021	"I Will Be Gone" (Primal Fear feat. Tarja Turunen)	I Will Be Gone EP
2021	"Sleeping Sun (country version)" (Steve 'n' Seagulls feat. Tarja Turunen)	Seagulls Nest
2021	"Until My Last Breath (country version)" (Steve 'n' Seagulls feat. Tarja Turunen)	Seagulls Nest
2022	"Dark Chest of Wonders" (Crewish feat. Tarja Turunen & Tapio Wilska)	Twice
2024	"Left on Mars" (Marko Hietala feat. Tarja Turunen)	Roses from the Deep

== See also ==
- Nightwish discography
