= Left in the Dark (Tarja EP) =

EP by Tarja
- Released: July 4, 2014
- Recorded: 2012–2013
- Length: 55:15
- Label: earMUSIC
- Producer: Tarja, Mic

Tarja chronology
Colours in the Dark (2013)	Left in the Dark (2014)	Luna Park Ride (2015)

Left in the Dark is the second EP by the Finnish singer Tarja Turunen. The record features different versions of songs included in the chart-topping album Colours in the Dark, plus a studio version of "Into the Sun", previously only available as a live track (originally on Act I).

== Cover art ==
In February 2014, Tarja held a competition for creating the official cover art for Left in the Dark. The competition received over 1,000 submissions, and only ten winners were chosen. The first place winner, Mikoláš Gál, had his artwork become the front cover art, and the second place winner, Predrag Milosevic, had his artwork become the back cover for the EP. Eight other winners were chosen to have their artwork be featured in the EP's physical booklet.

== Track listing ==
No.	Title	Writer(s)	Length
1.	"Victim of Ritual" (First Demo)	Mattias Lindblom; Anders Wollbeck; Tarja Turunen	4:45
2.	"500 Letters" (Live At Vorterix Radio)	Johnny Lee Andrews; Turunen	3:36
3.	"Lucid Dreamer" (Demo)	Lindblom; Wollbeck; Turunen	5:23
4.	"Never Enough" (Demo Progression)	Andrews; Turunen	4:04
5.	"Mystique Voyage" (Demo)	Turunen	6:36
6.	"Into The Sun" (Studio Version)	Lindblom; Wollbeck; Turunen; Steve van Velvet	6:11
7.	"Deliverance" (Instrumental)	James Michael Dooley; Lindblom; Wollbeck; Turunen	7:41
8.	"Neverlight" (Full Orchestra Version)	Jesper Strömblad; Lindblom; Wollbeck; Turunen	4:29
9.	"Until Silence" (Live At Vorterix Radio)	Marko Saaresto; Olli Tukiainen; Markus Kaarlonen; Turunen	4:18
10.	"Medusa" (Tarja’s Solo Version)	Bart Hendrickson; Angela Heldmann; Turunen	8:12
