= Act II (Tarja album) =

2018 live album by Tarja Turunen

Video by Tarja Turunen
- Released: July 27, 2018
- Recorded: Metropolis Studios, London, 6 June 2016, Teatro de La Luna, Milan, 29 November 2016
- Genre: Symphonic metal
- Length: 3:26:09
- Label: earMUSIC
- Producers: Tarja & Mic

Tarja Turunen chronology
| Act I : Live in Rosario (2012) | Act II (2018) | Circus Life (2025) |

Act II

Live album by Tarja
- Released: July 27, 2018
- Recorded: Teatro de La Luna, Milan, 29 November 2016
- Genre: Symphonic metal
- Length: 1:57:12
- Label: earMUSIC
- Producers: Tarja & Mic

Tarja chronology
| From Spirits and Ghosts (Score for a Dark Christmas) (2017) | Act II (2018) | In the Raw (2019) |

Singles from Act II
- 1. "Love To Hate (Live in London)" Released: 1 June 2018; 2. "Undertaker (Live In Milan)" Released: 22 June 2018; 3. "Victim of Ritual (Live at Woodstock)" Released: 13 July 2018

Professional ratings
Review scores
| Source | Rating |
|---|---|
| Loudersound | 4/5 stars |

Act II is the fourth live album released by the Finnish singer Tarja Turunen, released on July 27, 2018. It is the predecessor to her previous album in her "Act" series, Act I: Live in Rosario. The CD and digital release features a full-length concert performed by Tarja during her tour titled The Shadow Shows for her sixth studio album, The Shadow Self, recorded on November 26, 2016, at the Teatro de La Luna in Milan, Italy. The DVD and Blu-ray release features an additional disc, titled Metropolis Alive, which features a special intimate concert performed in front of 20 people on 6 June 2016 live at Metropolis Studios in London, England.

The tracklist for both concerts features multiple songs from her six studio albums released up to that point, such as "I Walk Alone", "Until My Last Breath", "Victim of Ritual", and "Innocence", as well as a special Nightwish medley featuring the songs Tutankhamen, "Ever Dream", The Riddler, and Slaying The Dreamer.

On 28 May 2018, Tarja released the first official teaser for "Act II".

On 1 June 2018, the first single, "Love To Hate (Live in London)" was released. On 22 June 2018, the second single, "Undertaker (Live In Milan)" was released. On 13 July 2018, the final single, "Victim of Ritual" was released.

== Background ==
The album is the second in her "Act" series of live albums, featuring songs spanning across her solo career up to the point of recording both concerts. The main concert for the release was filmed at Teatro de la Luna in Milan, Italy on 29 November 2016 during her promotional tour for her sixth studio album The Shadow Self. It features a tracklist with 21 songs, including a medley of Nightwish songs and a few covers.

The DVD and mediabook version features a second concert as the first disc, which was a concert recorded on 6 June 2016 at Metropolis Studios in London, England. The concert was a special event for 20 fans who had won a contest to witness an intimate, special live performance featuring songs from Tarja's then unreleased album, The Shadow Self.

== Double DVD track listing ==
DVD1 (Filmed at Metropolis Studios on 6 June 2016)
| No. | Title | Writer(s) | Length |
|---|---|---|---|
| 1. | "Intro" | | 1:03 |
| 2. | "No Bitter End" | Turunen; Alex Scholpp; Lindblom; Daniel Pieper | 5:27 |
| 3. | "Eagle Eye" | Turunen; Pauli Rantasalmi | 4:50 |
| 4. | "Sing For Me" | Kid Crazy; Christel Sundberg; Tracy Lipp | 4:50 |
| 5. | "Love To Hate" | Turunen; Erik Nyholm; Angela Heldmann | 6:16 |
| 6. | "The Living End" | Turunen; Johnny Andrews | 4:57 |
| 7. | "Medusa" | Bart Hendrickson; Angela Heldmann; Turunen | 10:42 |
| 8. | "Calling From the Wild" | Turunen; Scholpp; Lindblom | 5:31 |
| 9. | "Victim of Ritual" | Mattias Lindblom; Anders Wollbeck; Tarja Turunen | 6:02 |
| 10. | "Die Alive" | Wollbeck; Sørvaag; Lindblom; Turunen | 5:05 |
| 11. | "Innocence" | Tarja Turunen; Anders Wollbeck; Mattias Lindblom | 5:02 |
| 12. | "Until My Last Breath" | Johnny Andrews; Turunen | 5:51 |
| 13. | "Too Many" | Turunen; Guillermo De Medio; Heldmann | 9:41 |

DVD2 (Filmed at Teatro de la Luna on 29 November 2016)
| No. | Title | Writer(s) | Length |
|---|---|---|---|
| 1. | "Against the Odds" (Intro) | | 2:39 |
| 2. | "No Bitter End" | Turunen; Alex Scholpp; Lindblom; Daniel Pieper | 4:40 |
| 3. | "500 Letters" | Johnny Lee Andrews; Turunen | 4:27 |
| 4. | "Eagle Eye" | Turunen; Pauli Rantasalmi | 4:45 |
| 5. | "Demons in You" | Turunen; Julian Barrett; Erik Nyholm; Alex Jonson; Christel Sundberg | 4:58 |
| 6. | "Lucid Dreamer" | Lindblom; Wollbeck; Turunen | 6:45 |
| 7. | "Shameless" | Turunen; Barrett | 4:01 |
| 8. | "The Living End" | Turunen; Johnny Andrews | 5:24 |
| 9. | "Calling From the Wild" | Turunen; Scholpp; Lindblom | 8:54 |
| 10. | "Supremacy" (Muse cover) | Matt Bellamy | 5:05 |
| 11. | "Medley: Tutankhamen / Ever Dream / The Riddler / Slaying The Dreamer" (Nightwish covers) | Tuomas Holopainen | 6:33 |
| 12. | "Goldfinger" (Shirley Bassey cover) | John Barry; Leslie Bricusse; Anthony Newley | 5:50 |
| 13. | "Deliverance" | James Michael Dooley; Lindblom; Wollbeck; Turunen | 8:26 |
| 14. | "Acoustic Set: "Until Silence"; "The Reign"; "Mystique Voyage"; "House of Wax"; "I Walk Alone" | Marko Saaresto; Olli Tukiainen; Markus Kaarlonen; Paul McCartney; Wollbeck; Lindblom; Sommerdahl; Zagoritis; Stenzel; Heldmann; Turunen | 11:46 |
| 15. | "Love To Hate" | Turunen; Erik Nyholm; Angela Heldmann | 6:06 |
| 16. | "Victim of Ritual" | Mattias Lindblom; Anders Wollbeck; Tarja Turunen | 6:10 |
| 17. | "Undertaker" | Turunen; Atli Örvarsson; Lindblom | 8:09 |
| 18. | "Too Many" | Turunen; Guillermo De Medio; Heldmann | 8:33 |
| 19. | "Innocence" | Tarja Turunen; Anders Wollbeck; Mattias Lindblom | 5:03 |
| 20. | "Die Alive" | Wollbeck; Sørvaag; Lindblom; Turunen | 4:56 |
| 21. | "Until My Last Breath" | Johnny Andrews; Turunen | 7:40 |

== Double CD track listing ==
CD1
| No. | Title | Length |
|---|---|---|
| 1. | "No Bitter End" | 4:25 |
| 2. | "500 Letters" | 4:14 |
| 3. | "Eagle Eye" | 4:40 |
| 4. | "Demons in You" | 4:59 |
| 5. | "Lucid Dreamer" | 6:42 |
| 6. | "Shameless" | 3:52 |
| 7. | "The Living End" | 4:56 |
| 8. | "Calling From the Wild" | 9:04 |
| 9. | "Supremacy" | 5:03 |
| 10. | "Tutankhamen - Ever Dream - The Riddler - Slaying The Dreamer" | 6:38 |

CD2
| No. | Title | Length |
|---|---|---|
| 1. | "Goldfinger" | 4:13 |
| 2. | "Deliverance" | 7:40 |
| 3. | "Until Silence - The Reign - Mystique Voyage - House of Wax - I Walk Alone" | 10:29 |
| 4. | "Love to Hate" | 5:53 |
| 5. | "Victim of Ritual" | 5:58 |
| 6. | "Undertaker" | 6:41 |
| 7. | "Too Many" | 7:58 |
| 8. | "Innocence" | 4:44 |
| 9. | "Die Alive" | 4:01 |
| 10. | "Until My Last Breath" | 5:02 |
