= In Concert – Live at Sibelius Hall =

In Concert - Live at Sibelius Hall

Video by Tarja Turunen & Harus
- Released: November 17, 2011
- Recorded: 2009
- Genres: Opera, Classical Music, Experimental
- Length: 58 min.
- Label: earMUSIC

Tarja Turunen & Harus chronology
In Concert - Live at Sibelius Hall (2011)	Act I: Live in Rosario (2012)

In Concert – Live at Sibelius Hall is a collaboration album by the Finnish singer Tarja Turunen with musicians Kalevi Kiviniemi, Marzi Nyman and Markku Khron recorded at the Sibelius Hall, Finland and released on 25 November 2011.

== Information ==
First plans of creating a classical group came out in 2006, when Tarja, Kalevi, Marzi and Markku made a concert together for the first time. They continued to present some concerts through Finland until they decided to formalize the group, by naming it Harus. As Tarja explained:

"There is an old Finnish tradition when it comes to newborns – the baby is not to be named until the baptism ceremony, when he or she is presented to the family with the chosen name. A few years ago, in 2006, a new project was born and, following the same tradition, the time has come to baptize it, to make the presentations to the family and to give it a name – HARUS."

The first video of the album was released on 20 October, from the track You Would Have Loved This, but the official promotional video was released on 17 November, from the track Walking in the Air.

== Track listing ==
Standard track listing

No.	Title	Length
1.	"Arkihuolesi Kaikki Heitä"	3:19
2.	"Ave Maria Op. 80"	3:06
3.	"Ave Maria"	5:44
4.	"Maa On Niin Kaunis"	3:23
5.	"Varpunen Jouluaamuna"	5:16
6.	"Heinillä Härkien"	6:40
7.	"En Etsi Valtaa Loistoa"	4:06
8.	"Jouluyö, Juhlayö (Silent Night)"	5:08
9.	"Astral Bells"	5:24
10.	"You Would Have Loved This"	5:18
11.	"Walking in the Air"	5:27
12.	"Improvisation Variations Sur Un Noël"	5:53
Total length:		57:24

== Charts performance ==
Chart (2011)	Peak position
Finnish Albums (Suomen virallinen lista)	37
