= Innocence (Tarja song) =

Single by Tarja Turunen

from the album The Shadow Self
- Released: August 5, 2016
- Length: 4:18
- Label: earMUSIC; Metal Hammer
- Songwriter(s): Tarja Turunen; Anders Wollbeck; Mattias Lindblom
- Producer(s): Tarja Turunen

Tarja Turunen singles chronology
"500 Letters" (2013)	"Innocence" (2016)	"No Bitter End" (2016)

Music video
- "Innocence" on YouTube

"Innocence" is the lead single by Finnish singer Tarja, taken from her fourth studio album The Shadow Self. The single was released on August 5, 2016.

== Background ==
"Innocence" was written and composed by Tarja, Anders Wollbeck, and Mattias Lindblom, and produced by Tarja. The singer describes "Innocence" as a return to the origins from the musical point of view. The song, especially the solo piano by Tarja, is inspired by classical music.

== Video ==
The official video for the song was released on June 24, 2016. Tarja explained that "The theme of the video is about a very sensitive subject that hopefully helps people to think over it. I love the film approach to the video like a short movie". The video was shot in Buenos Aires by movie director Mariano Cattaneo. In the video there are scenes performed by actors, representing a family destroyed by domestic violence. At the end of the video, Tarja breaks into the room and paralyzes the family's father with a touch, saving the mother and the child.

== Track listing ==
CD
No.	Title	Writer(s)	Length
1.	"Innocence" (Radio Version)	Tarja Turunen; Anders Wollbeck; Mattias Lindblom	4:18
2.	"Demons in You" (Tarja Solo Version)	Turunen; Julian Barratt; Erik Nyholm; Alex Jonson; Christel Sundberg	4:43
3.	"Victim of Ritual"	Turunen; Wollbeck; Lindblom	5:55
4.	"Acoustic Set" (Rivers of Lust / Minor Heaven / Montanas De Silencio / Sing for Me / Feel Immortal)	Kid Crazy; Johan Westmar; Kristoffer Karlsson; Jessika Lundstrom; Turunen / Wollbeck; Lindblom / Martin Tillman; Turunen / Kid Crazy; Sundberg; Tracy Lipp / Toby Gad; Lindy Robbins; Kerli Kõiv; Turunen	10:17

"7 Vinyl + CD
No.	Title	Writer(s)	Length
1.	"Innocence" (Radio Version)	Turunen; Wollbeck; Lindblom
2.	"Innocence" (Video Version)	Turunen; Wollbeck; Lindblom
