= Luna Park Ride =

Live album by Tarja
- Released: May 29, 2015
- Recorded: Luna Park, Buenos Aires, Argentina, March 27, 2011 and various other places during 2010-2014
- Label: earMUSIC
- Producer: Tarja & Mic

Tarja chronology
Left in the Dark (2014)	Luna Park Ride (2015)	Ave Maria – En Plein Air (2015)

Luna Park Ride is the third live album released by the Finnish singer Tarja Turunen. The concert was filmed at Stadium Luna Park in Buenos Aires, Argentina by the fans and mixed by Tim Palmer. Apart from this show the release also contains 70 minutes of bonus material filmed during 2010-2014.

== Track listing ==
DVD1
No.	Title	Length
1.	"Dark Star"
2.	"My Little Phoenix"
3.	"The Crying Moon"
4.	"I Walk Alone"
5.	"Falling Awake"
6.	"Signos"
7.	"Little Lies"
8.	"Underneath"
9.	"Stargazers"
10.	"Ciaran's Well"
11.	"In for a Kill"
12.	"Where Were You Last Night / Heaven Is a Place on Earth / Livin' on a Prayer (Medley)"
13.	"Die Alive"
14.	"Until My Last Breath"
15.	"Wishmaster"

DVD2
No.	Title	Length
1.	"In for a Kill" (Masters of Rock / Czech Republic 2010. Featuring Philharmonic Bohuslava Martinû Zlin and choir)
2.	"I Walk Alone" (Masters of Rock / Czech Republic 2010. Featuring Philharmonic Bohuslava Martinû Zlin and choir)
3.	"Archive of Lost Dreams" (Masters of Rock / Czech Republic 2010. Featuring Philharmonic Bohuslava Martinû Zlin and choir)
4.	"Crimson Deep" (Masters of Rock / Czech Republic 2010. Featuring Philharmonic Bohuslava Martinû Zlin and choir)
5.	"I Feel Immortal" (Summerbreeze / Germany 2011)
6.	"The Siren (Nightwish)" (Summerbreeze / Germany 2011)
7.	"Until My Last Breath" (Summerbreeze / Germany 2011)
8.	"500 Letters" (Ekaterinburg / Russia 2014)
9.	"Damned & Divine" (Ekaterinburg / Russia 2014)
10.	"Neverlight" (Ekaterinburg / Russia 2014)
11.	"Anteroom of Death featuring Van Canto" (Wacken / Germany 2014)
12.	"Never Enough" (Summerbreeze / Germany 2014)
13.	"Die Alive" (Summerbreeze / Germany 2014)
14.	"Victim of Ritual" (Summerbreeze / Germany 2014)

== Charts performance ==
DVDs Chart (2015)	Peak position
Switzerland DVD Chart	3

Albums Chart (2015)	Peak position
Belgium Albums Chart (Flanders)	176
Belgium Albums Chart (Wallonia)	114
German Albums Chart	55
