= Colours in the Dark (album) =

Studio album by Tarja Turunen
- Released: 28 August 2013
- Recorded: 2012–2013
- Genre: Symphonic metal; symphonic rock
- Length: 61:11
- Label: earMUSIC; Universal
- Producer: Tarja; Mic

Tarja Turunen chronology
Act I: Live in Rosario (2012)	Colours in the Dark (2013)	Left in the Dark (2014)

Singles from Colours in the Dark
- 1. "Victim of Ritual" Released: 12 July 2013; 2. "500 Letters" Released: 1 November 2013

Colours in the Dark is the fourth studio album released by the Finnish singer Tarja Turunen. The record was released on 30 August 2013, in Austria, Brazil, Finland, Germany, Portugal, Spain, and Switzerland; 2 September in Norway, Poland, and the Czech Republic; 3 September in the United States and Canada; and 4 September in Belgium, Denmark, the Netherlands, Sweden, and the UK. Mixing was done by Tim Palmer in Austin, Texas in the United States. Tarja started the Colours in the Dark World Tour on 17 October 2013, to promote the album. The name of the album, as the cover image, came as a metaphor from the idea that life has a large range of colors and the dark absorbs all of them, containing every color.

An official lyric video of the song "Never Enough" was released 31 May. The video was shot in Zlin, Czech Republic. The song was also released as a single on iTunes. The first music video for "Victim of Ritual" was shot in Berlin, Germany, and was released on 10 July. A promo teaser was released on 26 June. On 12 September 2013, earMUSIC, Tarja's label, announced that the second single taken from the album is going to be "500 Letters". It would be released as a strictly limited CD single and download at the end of October. A promo teaser of the videoclip was released on 25 October and they announced that the premiere was going to be on 31 October. "500 Letters" was released on 1 November 2013 as a digital download only. On 20 February it was revealed on the blog that a new version of the album called Left in the Dark would be released later this year and will feature different versions of the songs on the original Colours in the Dark including acoustic versions of 500 Letters & Until Silence. A competition was held, with special prizes for the 5 best artworks. The winner's art would get to be the cover art for Left in the Dark, and the others in the booklet.

== Background ==
The vocal recordings of the album started late 2012 and continued throughout the beginning of 2013. Titles of the album's songs were revealed from times to times through Tarja's blog, like she did with My Winter Storm (2007). The album's name came out of the song "Until Silence". This is the third time the album's name came out of one of the songs. The artwork and some promotional pictures for this album were taken mainly in India during the What Lies Beneath World Tour in 2011. During the end of that tour Tarja already performed "Into the Sun" and a different version of "Never Enough". Both songs ended up on the Colours in the Dark album and were also featured on the Act I video album.

During the process of composition, Tarja alleged that she "had to learn a lot as a soloist, for good and or evil, and often in the past years [she] thought that [she] would never reach a day coming to the point where [she is] today", also adding that she had a lot of "positive and negative" experiences that would finish on this record, that is "very rich in colors, shadows, deep aspects and that it does not capture at the first listen".

During the middle of 2013, Turunen began via earMUSIC uploading two videos per week until the album itself was released. The official pre-listening started one week prior to the album's release. The album cover was created by artist Dirk Rudolph.

== Songs and lyrics ==
The first single and the first song of the album, "Victim of Ritual" was described by Tarja as a rock song. According to the singer, the track it is very theatrical and has all aspects of her career, as the symphonic side and the aggressive guitars. Regarding your concept, she said for Sonic Shocks that "it is a powerful story, about how rituals ... we ourselves are subject to some rituals sometimes and we don't even realize it, I wanted to take this subject and put it in a song."

"Lucid Dreamer" is about her love with soundtrack, and she sees that song as a psychedelic one. In the "Mystique Voyage", Turunen uses three languages: english, spanish and finnish. Tarja talked for the El Litoral that the track is like a trip and there are many journeys on it. "Deliverance" is the first love song Turunen wrote, she revealed that, for this music, she worked closely with Jim Dooley. The last track of the album, "Medusa" has a beautiful and mythological story. About the process of composition, the artist said that "Medusa is a very strong, mystical, very inspiring female character. The story came too late for me, I was already in the recording process, testing the vocal harmonies, and then 'oh!' I heard the snakes singing their harmonies in vocal backing, the choirs, then I thought 'the snakes are singing' is crazy (laughs) so I soon thought of her. Now it's a duet that I do with Justin Furstenfeld, he's from the band Blue October, and I love the work he did, the vocals were amazing so, have fun!"

== Critical reception ==
Professional ratings
Review scores
Source	Rating
About.com	3.5/5 stars
Metal Hammer	5/7 stars
TeamRock	4/5 stars

Colours in the Dark was a worldwide chart success, few days after the release, the album collected five Top 10 entries. In the Czech Republic, the record received the gold-disc certification.

The reception from critics was positive as well. Classic Rock Prog considered Colours in the Dark Turunen's strongest solo release to date. Infernal Masquerade, SOUNDI and Lust for Life Magazine agree, saying that it is "the best Tarja album to date". According to Fireworks, with this album, "Tarja has reached a level of sustained maturity and dynamism with her song writing and singing whereby nothing is beyond her capability". The site also praises the first single, "Victim of Ritual", calling it "simply stunning".

Todd Lyons at About.com gave the album a somewhat favourable review, but not without criticism; he described it as "riskier than Tarja's previous three solo albums", and that it was "a huge panorama of operatic metal, where some artistic experimentation is attempted, but repeatedly crushed under the album's bombast", whilst also referring to "Lucid Dreamer" as "maddeningly flawed". Metal Hammer give the album a score 5 out of 7, while TeamRock give the 4 out 5. Anette Olzon, Tarja's replacement in Nightwish, expressed appreciation for the album, commenting that "it's really her best album so far" and also thought that Tarja's "definitely found her own style".

== Track listing ==
No.	Title	Writer(s)	Length
1.	"Victim of Ritual"	Mattias Lindblom; Anders Wollbeck; Tarja Turunen	5:54
2.	"500 Letters"	Johnny Lee Andrews; Turunen	4:22
3.	"Lucid Dreamer"	Lindblom; Wollbeck; Turunen	7:28
4.	"Never Enough"	Andrews; Turunen	5:20
5.	"Mystique Voyage"	Turunen	7:14
6.	"Darkness"	Peter Gabriel	5:38
7.	"Deliverance"	James Michael Dooley; Lindblom; Wollbeck; Turunen	7:27
8.	"Neverlight"	Jesper Strömblad; Lindblom; Wollbeck; Turunen	4:33
9.	"Until Silence"	Marko Saaresto; Olli Tukiainen; Markus Kaarlonen; Turunen	5:03
10.	"Medusa" (featuring Justin Furstenfeld)	Bart Hendrickson; Angela Heldmann; Turunen	8:12

iTunes Bonus Tracks
No.	Title	Writer(s)	Length
11.	"Neverlight" (Full Orchestral Version)	Strömblad; Lindblom; Wollbeck; Turunen	4:29
12.	"Until Silence" (Orchestral Version)	Saaresto; Tukiainen; Kaarlonen; Turunen	4:32

Special Edition Bonus Download
No.	Title	Writer(s)	Length
11.	"Into the Sun" (Studio Version)	Steve Van Velvet; Lindblom; Wollbeck; Turunen	6:10

Limited Box Set Edition Bonus Download
No.	Title	Writer(s)	Length
11.	"Into the Sun" (Studio Version)	Van Velvet; Lindblom; Wollbeck; Turunen	6:10
12.	"Medusa" (Tarja Solo Version)	Hendrickson; Heldmann; Turunen	8:12
13.	"Deliverance" (Instrumental Version)	Dooley; Lindblom; Wollbeck; Turunen	7:41

Notes

- Special edition includes a 40-page picture booklet and download code for bonus track.
- Limited box set edition includes the special edition of the album, exclusive "Colours in the Dark" T-shirt, 60-page photo book (150g paper), double sided poster (A2 size), photo collage poster (A2 size) and download code for 3 bonus tracks.

== Personnel ==
Adapted from the album's booklet.

Musicians

- Tarja Turunen – Lead vocals and piano
- Alex Scholpp, Julian Barrett – Guitar
- Kevin Chown, Doug Wimbish – Bass
- Christian Kretschmar – Keyboards
- Mike Terrana – Drums
- Max Lilja – Cello

Additional musicians

- Thomas Bloch – Glass harmonica, Cristal Baschet
- Saro Danielian – Duduk, Oboe
- Doug Wimbish – Cinemasonics
- Mamu – Seagull
- Justin Furstenfeld – Vocals ("Medusa")
- Caroline Lavelle – Cello
- Naomi Cabuli Turunen (Tarja's daughter) ("Lucid Dreamer")

Production

- James Dooley – Orchestral & Choir Arrangements, tracks 1, 3, 5, 7, 8, 9
- Bart Hendrickson – Orchestral & Choir Arrangements, track 10
- Max Lilja – Orchestral Arrangement for multiple cello
- Mel Wesson – Ambient music design, track 3, 4, 7
- Tim Palmer – Programming, track 3, 4, 5
- Mel Wesson – Programming, track 7
- Bart Hendrickson – Programming, track 10
- Mic – Shells recorded with iPhone in Antigua, track 5
- Jetro Vainio, Mario Altamirano, Torsten Stenzel, Daniel Willy – Recording engineers
- Martin Muscatello, José Maradei – Assistant engineers
- Tim Palmer – Additional production & mixes
- Alex Scholpp, Julian Barrett, Jim Dooley – Executive producers

== Charts and sales ==
Chart performance for Colours in the Dark
Chart (2013)	Peak position
Austrian Albums (Ö3 Austria)	14
Belgian Albums (Ultratop Flanders)	34
Belgian Albums (Ultratop Wallonia)	33
Czech Albums (ČNS IFPI)	7
Dutch Albums (Album Top 100)	29
Finnish Albums (Suomen virallinen lista)	5
French Albums (SNEP)	54
German Albums (Offizielle Top 100)	6
Norwegian Albums (VG-lista)	29
Polish Albums (ZPAV)	8
Russian Albums (2M)	5
Swedish Albums (Sverigetopplistan)	53
Swiss Albums (Schweizer Hitparade)	20
UK Rock and Metal Albums (BPI)	10
UK Top Independent Albums	24
UK Official Physical Sales	77
UK Albums (OCC)	109
US Top Heatseeker (Billboard)	13

Sales Certifications

Region	Certification
Czech Republic (ČNS IFPI)	Gold
