= Yhden enkelin unelma =

Single by Tarja Turunen
- Released: 1 December 2004
- Genre: Classical
- Length: 13:10
- Label: Universal Music
- Songwriter(s): Jean Sibelius; Zachris Topelius
- Producer(s): Esa Nieminen

Tarja Turunen singles chronology
"Yhden enkelin unelma" (2004)	"You Would Have Loved This" (2006)

"Yhden enkelin unelma" ("One Angel's Dream") is a Christmas song by the Finnish singer Tarja Turunen, released as her first single in December 2004, when she was still part of the symphonic metal band Nightwish. It was also released as a limited edition extended play.

Right after the release it debuted at number 2, and ended 2004 after more three weeks at number 1; it started 2005 as number 4, and reached number 1 again in December 2005, after spending 10 weeks on the official Finnish charts. The single reached gold disc status in Finland with more than 7,000 copies sold.

The single is sung entirely in the Finnish language, and Turunen promoted it with a mini tour holding concerts in Finland, Germany, Spain and Romania, in late 2005.

== Track listing ==
=== Standard edition ===
"Yhden enkelin unelma" single track listing
No.	Title	Writer(s)	Length
1.	"En etsi valtaa, loistoa"	Jean Sibelius, Zachris Topelius	3:30
2.	"Kun joulu on"	Otto Kotilainen; Alpo Noponen	3:36
3.	"En etsi valtaa, loistoa" (live)	Jean Sibelius; Zachris Topelius	3:32
4.	"Kun joulu on" (live)	Kotilainen; Noponen	3:31

=== Pop edition ===
- "En etsi valtaa, loistoa"
- "Kun joulu on"

=== Acoustic edition ===
- "En etsi valtaa, loistoa" (acoustic)
- "Kun joulu on" (acoustic)

== Personnel ==
=== Musicians ===
- Tarja Turunen – lead vocals
- Heikki Pohto – flute
- Esa Nieminen – piano
- Juha Lanu – classic guitar
- Heikki Hämäläinen, Outi Iljin, Veli-Matti Iljin and Seppo Rautasuo – support orchestra

=== Main crew ===
- Esa Nieminen – orchestral arrangements
- Tarja Turunen and Sirja Tiilikainen – co-production
- Jetro Vainio – mixing
- Mika Jussila – mastering engineer
- Toni Härkönen – photos
