= Teatro de La Luna =

Teatro de la Luna is an Arlington County, Virginia Theater founded in 1991 that aims to preserve Hispanic heritage. It houses events including: the International Festivals of Hispanic Theater, Latino film festivals and Immigration films festivals.

== Budget ==
Teatro de la Luna is supported by the Arlington Cultural Affairs Division of Arlington Economic Development and the Arlington Commission for the Arts.

== See also ==
- GALA Hispanic Theatre
- Office of Latino Affairs of the District of Columbia
- Latin American culture
- Hispanics in Washington, D.C.
- Columbia Heights (Washington, D.C.)
- Theatre in Washington, D.C.
