= You Would Have Loved This =

Single by Tarja Turunen

from the album Henkäys ikuisuudesta
- Released: 25 October 2006
- Genre: Classical
- Label: Universal Music
- Songwriter: Cori Connors

Tarja Turunen singles chronology
"Yhden Enkelin Unelma" (2004)	"You Would Have Loved This" (2006)	"I Walk Alone" (2007)

You Would Have Loved This is Tarja's second solo single which is a dedication to her mother and predates the release of her Christmas album, Henkäys Ikuisuudesta. Five fans watched the single being made after winning the promotion, "Win a Day With Tarja Turunen", made in the official web forum. The single was released with only 1,000 copies, that were sold out in the first selling week, taking the 5th place in the official Finnish parades, the highest position for a new music in the first week.

"You Would Have Loved This" was recorded originally by Cori Connors to the album "Sleepy Little Town". The music was written for Connors' mother-in-law, Helen Roy Connors, who died in 1994. Tarja saw similarities with the lyrics, and decided to put on the album:

I found this song in America. The story in the lyrics fits this album perfectly. It’s about a big loss of a dear one. With this in mind, we tried an even more intimate version on the album than on the single. It has a very touching and beautiful melody.

— Tarja Turunen, about the song

== Track listing ==
1. "You Would Have Loved This" (Radio version)
2. "Walking In The Air" (Classical version)
3. "You Would Have Loved This" (Single Version)

== Personnel ==
- Tarja Turunen - Lead vocals
- Esa Nieminen - Piano
