= 500 Letters =

Single by Tarja Turunen

from the album Colours In The Dark
- Released: November 1, 2013
- Length: 4:22
- Label: earMUSIC
- Songwriter(s): Tarja Turunen, Johnny Lee Andrews
- Producer(s): Tarja Turunen

Tarja Turunen singles chronology
"Victim of Ritual" (2013)	"500 Letters" (2013)	"Innocence" (2016)

Music video
- "500 Letters" on YouTube

"500 Letters" is the second single by Finnish singer Tarja, taken from her fourth studio album Colours in the Dark. It was announced that the single would be released at the end of September as a strictly limited CD single and download; however, no further release information was given until the end of October. The music video was officially released on October 31, 2013 with local pre-premieres on the 30th.

The single was released on November 1, 2013 as digital download only.

== Track listing ==
Track listing given by amazon.de:

No.	Title	Writer(s)	Length
1.	"500 Letters"	Tarja Turunen; Johnny Lee Andrews	4:22
2.	"Rivers of Lust / Minor Heaven / Montañas de Silencio / Sing for Me / I Feel Immortal" (Live Acoustic)	Kid Crazy; Johan Westmar; Kristoffer Karlsson; Jessika Lundstrom; Turunen / Anders Wollbeck; Mattias Lindblom / Martin Tillman; Turunen / Kid Crazy; Christel Sundberg; Tracy Lipp / Toby Gad; Lindy Robbins; Kerli Kõiv; Turunen	10:17

== Music video ==
The video for '500 Letters' was filmed on an island in Tigre, Argentina.

== Chart performance ==
Chart	Peak position
Czech Republic Radio Modern Rock	4
