= Act I: Live in Rosario =

2012 live album by Tarja Turunen

Act I : Live in Rosario

Video by Tarja Turunen
- Released: August 24, 2012
- Recorded: Teatro El Circulo, Rosario, Argentina, March 30 & 31, 2012
- Genres: Symphonic metal; alternative rock
- Length: 3:55:00
- Label: earMUSIC
- Director: Max Vaccaro
- Producers: Tarja & Mic

Act I : Live in Rosario

Live album by Tarja
- Released: August 24, 2012
- Recorded: Teatro El Circulo, Rosario, Argentina, March 30 & 31, 2012
- Genres: Symphonic metal; alternative rock; classical-crossover
- Length: 123:48
- Labels: earMUSIC, Nuclear Blast
- Producers: Tarja & Mic

Tarja chronology
What Lies Beneath (2010)	Act I : Live in Rosario (2012)	Colours in the Dark (2013)

Singles from Act I : Live in Rosario
- 1. "Into the Sun" Released: 13 July 2012

Act I is the first live album released by the Finnish singer Tarja Turunen. The two concerts were recorded and filmed with 10 HD cameras at the El Círculo Theatre in Rosario, Argentina, in March 2012, and released on CD, DVD and Blu-ray on 24 August 2012. Additionally, the Act I media book contains a live recording from Luna Park (titled DVD3).

The track listing consists in a mix of her three solo albums, Nightwish's classic "Nemo" and covers of Andrew Lloyd Webber, Gary Moore and Whitesnake plus a variety of extras.

earMUSIC released the first official teaser for "Act I" on 10 July 2012.

In July 2018, the predecessor to Act I was released, entitled "Act II".

== Reception ==
Professional ratings
Review scores
Source	Rating
About.com	3/5 stars
getreadytoROCK!	4/5 stars
Onemetal	4/5 stars
Sea of Tranquility	4/5 stars
Danger Dog Music Reviews	4/5 stars
Ave Noctum	7/10 stars
Metal.de	8/10 stars
Firebrand Magazine	9/10 stars
Planetmosh	(DVD)

The recording was well received among critics. A review from the website getredytoROCK! stated: "This live CD will certainly please her fans [...] epic metal meets pop and classical never sounded so good."

In its review for Firebrand Magazine, Lee Walker commented: "Tarja has once again proved that she walks alone, 7 long years have passed since she parted ways with her previous band, and throughout that time she has continued to prove that she is a successful artist in her right. “Act I” manages to successfully capture all of the magic behind her live performances."

Ant May from Planetmosh praised the technical aspects of the DVD, stating that "[t]he lighting is fantastic with plenty of colour and lighting effects plus use of lasers which all combine to create great visuals" and also called the sound "flawless" and "crystal clear".

== Double DVD track listing ==
DVD1
No.	Title	Writer(s)	Length
1.	"If You Believe" (intro)		4:00
2.	"Anteroom of Death"	Michelle Leonard; Kiko Masbaum; Tarja Turunen	4:20
3.	"My Little Phoenix"	Ruud Houweling; Michiel Van Zundert	5:20
4.	"Dark Star"	Johnny Andrews; Turunen	5:15
5.	"Naiad"	Torsten Stenzel; Angela Heldmann; Adrian Zagoritis; Turunen	7:22
6.	"Falling Awake"	Andrews; Turunen	5:18
7.	"I Walk Alone"	Anders Wollbeck; Mattias Lindblom; Harry Sommerdahl	5:45
8.	"Orpheus Hallucination / Orpheus in the Underworld"	Jacques Offenbach	6:35
9.	"Little Lies" (instrumental)		2:17
10.	"Little Lies"	Alex Scholpp; Andrews; Turunen	5:48
11.	"Into the Sun"	Wollbeck; Lindblom; Steve van Velvet; Turunen	4:38
12.	"Nemo" (Nightwish cover)	Tuomas Holopainen	6:05
13.	"Acoustic Set: "Rivers of Lust"; "Minor Heaven"; "Montañas de Silencio"; "Sing for Me"; "I Feel Immortal"	Kid Crazy; Johan Westmar; Kristoffer Karlsson; Jessika Lundstrom; Turunen / Wollbeck; Lindblom / Martin Tillman; Turunen / Kid Crazy; Christel Sundberg; Tracy Lipp / Toby Gad; Lindy Robbins; Kerli Kõiv; Turunen	10:40
14.	"Never Enough"	Andrews; Turunen	5:05
15.	"In for a Kill"	Wollbeck; Lindblom; Turunen	6:10
16.	"Toccata and Fugue in D minor, BWV 565 / The Phantom of the Opera"	Johann Sebastian Bach / Andrew Lloyd Webber	7:05
17.	"Die Alive"	Wollbeck; Hanne Sørvaag; Lindblom; Turunen	5:00
18.	"Until My Last Breath"	Andrews; Turunen	8:40
19.	"Over the Hills and Far Away" (Gary Moore cover)	Gary Moore	12:01

DVD2
No.	Title	Writer(s)	Length
1.	"Boy and the Ghost"	Jessika Lundstrom; Anine Stang; Alexander Jonsson; Lindblom; Wollbeck; Turunen	4:30
2.	"Lost Northern Star"	Masbaum; Leonard; Turunen	5:15
3.	"Ciarán's Well"	Scholpp; Leonard; Doug Wimbish; Turunen	3:45
4.	"Tired of Being Alone" (Schiller cover)	Christopher von Deylen; Marcelo Cabuli; Turunen	6:40
5.	"Medley: Where Were You Last Night / Heaven Is a Place on Earth / Livin' on a Prayer"	Norell Oson Bard / Rick Nowels; Ellen Shipley / Jon Bon Jovi; Richie Sambora; Desmond Child	4:10
6.	"Underneath"	Andrews; Turunen	6:05
7.	"The Reign"	Zagoritis; Stenzel; Heldmann; Turunen	5:05
8.	"Oasis / The Archive of Lost Dream"	Turunen	5:45
9.	"Still of the Night" (Whitesnake cover)	John Sykes; David Coverdale	7:00
10.	"Crimson Deep"	Bart Hendrickson; Heldmann; Turunen	7:43

+ Bonus:

- Interviews with Tarja & the band members
- Videoclip: "Into the Sun"
- Photogallery 1: Through the Eyes of the Fans
- Photogallery 2: From Our Vaults: A Fly on the Wall

== Double CD track listing ==
CD1
No.	Title	Length
1.	"Anteroom of Death"	4:20
2.	"My Little Phoenix"	4:42
3.	"Dark Star"	4:44
4.	"Naiad"	7:34
5.	"Falling Awake"	5:15
6.	"I Walk Alone"	4:27
7.	"Little Lies"	4:23
8.	"Into the Sun"	4:31
9.	"Nemo"	5:03
10.	"Never Enough"	4:55
11.	"Still of the Night"	6:41
12.	"In for a Kill"	5:07

CD2
No.	Title	Length
1.	"Boy and the Ghost"	4:29
2.	"Lost Northern Star"	4:38
3.	"Ciarán's Well"	3:40
4.	"Tired of Being Alone"	5:56
5.	"Where Were You Last Night / Heaven Is a Place on Earth / Livin' on a Prayer (Medley)"	4:05
6.	"Underneath"	5:40
7.	"Oasis / The Archive of Lost Dream"	4:17
8.	"Crimson Deep"	7:35
9.	"The Phantom of the Opera"	6:48
10.	"Die Alive"	4:11
11.	"Until My Last Breath"	4:40
12.	"Over the Hills and Far Away"	6:07

== Media Book ==
An alternative edition of Act I contains the double CD and DVDs, as well an 80-page photo book and an additional live DVD of the concert at Luna Park.

DVD3
No.	Title	Length
1.	"Dark Star"
2.	"My Little Phoenix"
3.	"The Crying Moon"
4.	"I Walk Alone"
5.	"Falling Awake"
6.	"Signos"
7.	"Little Lies"
8.	"Underneath"
9.	"Stargazers"
10.	"Ciaran's Well"
11.	"In for a Kill"
12.	"Where Were You Last Night / Heaven Is a Place on Earth / Livin' on a Prayer (Medley)"
13.	"Die Alive"
14.	"Until My Last Breath"
15.	"Wishmaster"

== Personnel ==
=== Main musicians ===
- Tarja Turunen - lead vocals, piano, keyboards, producer
- Alex Scholpp - guitars
- Kevin Chown - bass, backing vocals, ukulele bass
- Christian Kretschmar - keyboards, cello
- Mike Terrana - drums, djembe
- Max Lilja - cello

=== Guest musicians ===
- Doug Wimbish - bass, acoustic bass guitar
- Julian Barratt - guitars
- Diego Valdez - vocals on "The Phantom of the Opera"

=== Production ===
- Mic - producer
- Tim Palmer - mixing

== Charts ==
Chart performance for Act I: Live in Rosario (video)
Chart (2012)	Peak position
Austrian Music DVD (Ö3 Austria)	3
Belgian Music DVD (Ultratop Flanders)	7
Belgian Music DVD (Ultratop Wallonia)	2
Dutch Music DVD (MegaCharts)	4
Finnish Music DVD (Suomen virallinen lista)	1
French Music DVD (SNEP)	2
Swedish Music DVD (Sverigetopplistan)	8
Swiss Music DVD (Schweizer Hitparade)	2

Chart performance for Act I: Live in Rosario (album)
Chart (2012)	Peak position
Austrian Albums (Ö3 Austria)	36
Belgian Albums (Ultratop Flanders)	99
Belgian Albums (Ultratop Wallonia)	82
Czech Albums (ČNS IFPI)	18
Finnish Albums (Suomen virallinen lista)	12
French Albums (SNEP)	147
German Albums (Offizielle Top 100)	5
Swiss Albums (Schweizer Hitparade)	48
