= Never Enough (Tarja song) =

Song by Tarja

from the album Colours in the Dark
- Released: May 31, 2013
- Genre: Heavy metal
- Length: 5:20
- Label: earMUSIC
- Songwriter(s): Johnny Lee Andrews, Tarja Turunen
- Producer(s): Tarja Turunen

"Never Enough'" is a song released by the Finnish singer Tarja Turunen from her fourth studio album Colours in the Dark. The song was released on May 31, 2013 as a lyrical video-teaser song. The track is only available as a digital version. The song, although from the Colours in the Dark album, was previously featured on the Act I : Live in Rosario live album, as the song was first played at the end of the What Lies Beneath World Tour.

== Track listing ==
1. "Never Enough" – 5:20
2. "Never Enough" (Lyrical Video) – 5:20

== Video ==
The "Never Enough" lyric video was filmed in Zlin, Czech Republic. Tarja says:

I didn't want to make a traditional, boring lyric video for the song, so I appear on the video not just the lyrics of the song ... This video is not what we can call the official first music video from my new album, but just an improved version of a lyric video. The filming took only couple hours with Martin, who worked also on directing my first solo live rock DVD, "Act I".
