= Victim of Ritual =

Single by Tarja

from the album Colours In The Dark
- Released: July 12, 2013
- Length: 5:54
- Label: earMUSIC
- Songwriters: Tarja Turunen, Anders Wollbeck, Mattias Lindblom
- Producer: Tarja Turunen

Tarja singles chronology
"Into the Sun" (2013)	"Victim of Ritual" (2013)	"500 Letters" (2013)

Music video
- "Victim Of Ritual" on YouTube

"Victim of Ritual'" is the first single from Tarja Turunen's fourth studio album Colours In The Dark. The single was released on July 12, 2013 as a limited edition cd (3000 copies), vinyl (1500 copies) The song was inspired by the one-movement orchestral piece "Boléro", by Maurice Ravel.

== Music video ==
The video was shot in Berlin, Germany. and was released on 10 July. A promo teaser on YouTube was released on 26 June.

=== Synopsis ===
The music video takes place in a huge factory in a bleak, dark world and focuses on three individuals working there. An oboist who is forced to play a single monotonous sequence, an artist who can only paint canvas completely black, and a young man who is an aspiring dancer, but is forced to stand still. As Tarja stalks the factory, she throws a different colour at each person, and this shows them a better side of life. The oboist plays more complex sequences, the artist paints colourful and abstract designs, and the dancer starts to dance more energetically. Throughout the course of the video, Tarja is seen being chased by four masked, hooded figures who try to steal her colours. They try to make the lightening world dark again by throwing black powder, and knock out Tarja, but the three people from the factory fight back with the colours Tarja gifted them. As they smear the powder on their faces, they are shown to be invincible to the hooded gang's black powder, and eventually defeat them. Later, all wearing white instead of black previously, the three workers comfort a comatose Tarja. As they rub colours onto her skin, she opens her eyes. The video ends with a glimpse of the brighter life the people now live.

== Track listing ==
CD Version
No.	Title	Writer(s)	Length
1.	"Victim of Ritual"	Tarja Turunen, Anders Wollbeck, Mattias Lindblom	5:54
2.	"Victim of Ritual (First Demo)"	Tarja Turunen, Anders Wollbeck, Mattias Lindblom	4:44
3.	"I Walk Alone (Live Luna Park)"	Anders Wollbeck, Mattias Lindblom, Harry Sommerdahl	4:05
4.	"Underneath (Live Luna Park)"	Tarja Turunen, Johnny Andrews	5:33

Vinyl Version
No.	Title	Writer(s)	Length
1.	"Victim of Ritual"	Tarja Turunen, Anders Wollbeck, Mattias Lindblom	5:54
2.	"Victim of Ritual (First Demo)"	Tarja Turunen, Anders Wollbeck, Mattias Lindblom	4:44

Digital iTunes Version
No.	Title	Writer(s)	Length
1.	"Victim of Ritual"	Tarja Turunen, Anders Wollbeck, Mattias Lindblom	5:54
2.	"Victim of Ritual (First Demo)"	Tarja Turunen, Anders Wollbeck, Mattias Lindblom	4:44
3.	"I Walk Alone (Live Luna Park)"	Anders Wollbeck, Mattias Lindblom, Harry Sommerdahl	4:05
4.	"Underneath (Live Luna Park)"	Tarja Turunen, Johnny Andrews	5:33
5.	"Victim of Ritual (Music Video)"	Tarja Turunen, Anders Wollbeck, Mattias Lindblom	5:54
