= Mattias Lindblom =

Swedish musician

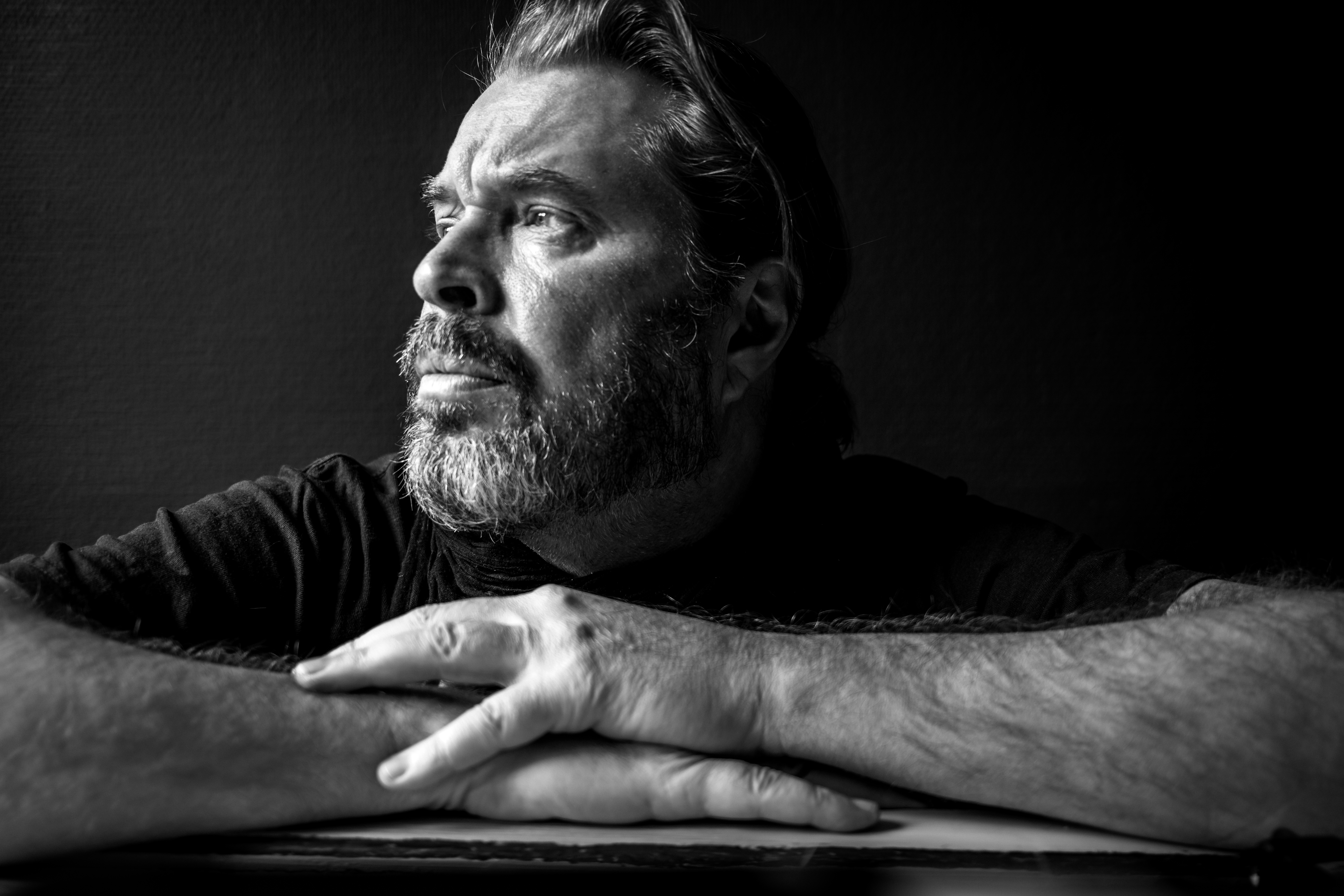

Background information
- Born: Sweden
- Occupations: Writer, Vocalist, Music Composer, Music Producer
- Labels: Stockholm Records, SSC, Universal Music Publishing, Sony ATV, Budde Music
- Website: https://www.instagram.com/mattias_lindblom/

Mattias Lindblom is a Swedish artist, writer, platinum selling music composer and music producer. He has contributed songs and productions for artists such as Vacuum, The Canadian Tenors, Andy Taylor (guitarist), Tarja Turunen, Tina Arena and Garou, as well as for musical, brands, TV and film. He is cofounder and lead singer of electronica band Vacuum. Mattias Lindblom is based in Europe.

== Selected works ==
A selection of work Composed (C) and Produced (P) by Mattias Lindblom:

- 2023 - Tina Arena: Love saves (C+P), House (C+P), Devil in me (C+P), Can't say anything (C+P), Outrun the night (C+P), Cry me a miracle (C+P), Mother to her child (C+P), Dancing on thin ice (C+P), Dancer Sur La Glace (C+P), Dared to love you first (P)
- 2023 - Tania Doko: Harder now (C+P), Where do we go now (C+P), A Wave (C+P), Before I break (C+P), No sleep (C+P), Hardcore (C+P)
- 2022 - Andy Taylor (guitarist): Man’s a wolf to man (C), Did it for you (C), The last straw (C), Influential blondes (C), Try to get even (C)
- 2022 - Tarja Turunen: Eye of the storm (C)
- 2021 - Tina Arena: Church (C+P)
- 2020 - Lindblom/Hall: My moon is a streetlight (C+P)
- 2020 - Jordan-Ravi: Pushing stars (C+P)
- 2019 - Tarja Turunen: Serene (C), You and I (C)
- 2019 - Lizzy V: Little big secret (C+P), Borderline (C+P)
- 2018 - Pablo Nouvelle: Harder now (C)
- 2018 - Laurent Mazzone Parfums, France: RADIKAL Campaign (C+P)
- 2017 - We Invented Paris: Storm (C)
- 2017 - Ewigi Liebi Musical, Gib mer a chance (C)
- 2016 - Tarja Turunen: Innocence (C), Diva (C), Undertaker (C), Calling from the wild (C), No bitter end (C)
- 2015 - Tina Arena: Karma (C), Love falls (C)
- 2014 - Vengaboys: Where did my Christmas tree go (C)
- 2013 - Tatort – Kalter Engel, soundtrack, score, theme song White light (C+P)
- 2013 - Tina Arena: You set fire to my life (C+P), Out of the blue (C+P)
- 2013 - TVXQ: Y3k (C)
- 2013 - Tarja Turunen: Victim of ritual (C), Lucid dreamer (C), Deliverance (C), Neverlight (C), Into the sun (C)
- 2011 - Keisha Buchanan: Fearless (C)
- 2010 - Vengaboys: Rocket to uranus (C)
- 2010 - Tarja Turunen: In for a kill (C), We are (C)
- 2009 - The Canadian Tenors: I only know how to love (C)
- 2009 - f(x): Chu~♡ (C)
- 2008 - Tarja Turunen: I walk alone (C), Ite, missa est (C), Boy and the ghost (C), Our great divide (C), Die alive (C), Minor heaven (C)
- 2008 - Garou: Accidental (C)
- 2007 - Monrose: What you don't know (C)
- 2005 - Rachel Stevens: Negotiate With Love (C, P)
- Till Brönner: Your Life (C)
- Alcazar: Celebrate The Night (C,P)
- Tata Young: Love Is The Law (C,P)
- Girls' Generation: Two Blocks Down (C)
- Jeany Zhang Jing: Dream Whispers TV theme (C)
- Jeanette Biedermann: Wild Like That (C,P)
- Viktorious: Out Of Control (C,P)
- Aloha From Hell: My Love You Are (C)
- Edyta Górniak: Błękit Myśli (C)
- Baschi: Gib Mer A Chance (C)
- Cinema Bizarre: Heavensent, The Other People, Get Off (C,P)
- Down Below: Sand In Meiner Hand (C,P)
- Florence Joy: Consequence Of Love (C)
- Julie Berthelsen: Home, Not That Song, November December (C,P)
- Marilou: Impatiemment (C)
- Rainie Young: Guai Bu Guai (C)
