= Tarja Turunen =

Finnish musician (born 1977)

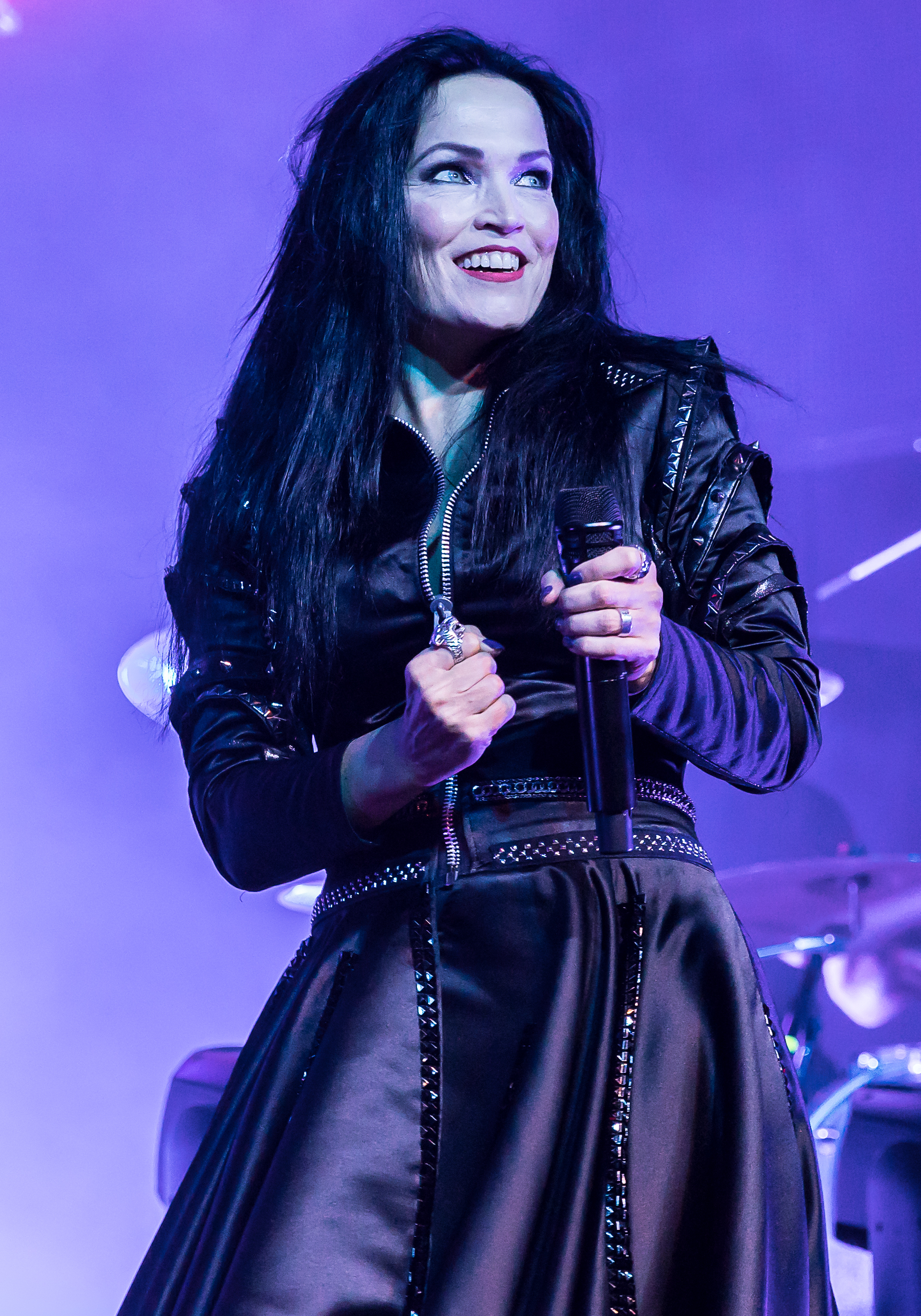
- Turunen performing in 2024

Background information
- Born: Tarja Soile Susanna Turunen; 17 August 1977 (age 49); Kitee, Finland
- Genres: Symphonic metal; power metal; gothic metal; classical crossover
- Occupations: Singer; songwriter
- Instruments: Vocals; piano
- Years active: 1996–present
- Labels: Universal; NEMS Enterprises; earMUSIC
- Formerly of: Nightwish
- Spouse: Marcelo Cabuli (m. 2002)
- Website: tarjaturunen.com

Tarja Soile Susanna Turunen-Cabuli (born 17 August 1977), known professionally as Tarja Turunen or simply Tarja, is a Finnish heavy metal singer best known as the former lead vocalist of the symphonic metal band Nightwish.

Turunen studied lyrical singing at Sibelius Academy and the Hochschule für Musik Karlsruhe. She is a professional classical lied singer with a three-octave vocal range, and founded symphonic metal band Nightwish with Tuomas Holopainen and Emppu Vuorinen in 1996. Their combination of hard and fast guitar riffs with Turunen's dramatic, "operatic" lead vocals quickly achieved critical and commercial popularity. Their classically influenced music, dubbed symphonic metal, inspired many other metal bands and performers.

Turunen was fired from the band on 21 October 2005 (just after the performance of the band's End of an Era concert) for personal reasons accompanied by an open letter from the band. She started her solo career in 2006 with the release of a Christmas album called Henkäys ikuisuudesta. In 2007, Turunen released My Winter Storm, an album featuring various styles including symphonic metal, and started the Storm World Tour. She performed several concerts in Europe, playing in metal festivals including the Graspop Metal Meeting and the Wacken Open Air, before releasing her third album, What Lies Beneath, supported by a tour, which lasted until April 2012. Her first live DVD Act I was filmed during this tour on 30 and 31 March 2012 in Argentina. Act I was released in August 2012. Turunen started the Colours in the Dark World Tour in October 2013 to promote her new album Colours in the Dark. Her second live DVD was filmed during the events of Beauty and the Beat with Mike Terrana and was released in May.

In September 2015, Turunen released her first classical studio album, Ave Maria – En Plein Air. In August 2016 she released her sixth studio album The Shadow Self, with a prequel EP The Brightest Void released on 3 June. On 17 November 2017, she released her second Christmas album, From Spirits and Ghosts, putting a dark orchestral twist on various classic holiday songs. In 2018, she released the follow-up to her first live album, Act II, which was filmed during her world tour for The Shadow Self. Her eighth studio album and her fifth metal album, In the Raw, was released on 30 August 2019. Turunen's third Christmas album and the follow-up sequel to From Spirits and Ghosts, entitled Dark Christmas, was released on 10 November 2023. Turunen's tenth studio album and sixth metal album, Frisson Noir, was released on 12 June 2026.

== Life and career ==
=== 1977–1995: Early life ===
Tarja Turunen was born in the small village of Puhos, near Kitee, Finland. She has an older brother, Timo, and a younger brother, Toni. Her mother Ritva Sisko Marjatta (Hakkarainen) worked in the town administration, and her father Teuvo Turunen is a carpenter. Her talent for music was first noted when she sang the song "Enkeli taivaan" (the Finnish version of "From Heaven Above to Earth I Come") in the Kitee church hall at age three. She joined the church choir and started taking vocal lessons. At age six, she started playing piano.

At comprehensive school, Turunen performed as a singer for several projects. Her first piano teacher Kirsti Nortia-Holopainen (Tuomas Holopainen's mother), "Tarja was in a school that had some very musical people. Even then she got to perform a lot. I think she sang in every school function there was." Her music teacher, Plamen Dimov, later explained that, "If you gave Tarja just one note, she immediately got it. With the others, you'd have to practice three, four, five times". At school she had a tough time, since some girls bullied her because they envied her voice. To solve that problem, Dimov organized projects outside school. At fifteen, Turunen had her first major appearance as a soloist at a church concert in front of a thousand listeners. In 1993 she attended the Senior Secondary School of Art and Music in Savonlinna.

For several years Turunen performed various songs including soul music by Whitney Houston and Aretha Franklin. Later she listened to songs from the classical crossover singer Sarah Brightman, especially the song "The Phantom of the Opera", and decided to focus on that genre of music. At eighteen, she moved to Kuopio to study at the Sibelius Academy.

=== 1996–2005: Nightwish ===
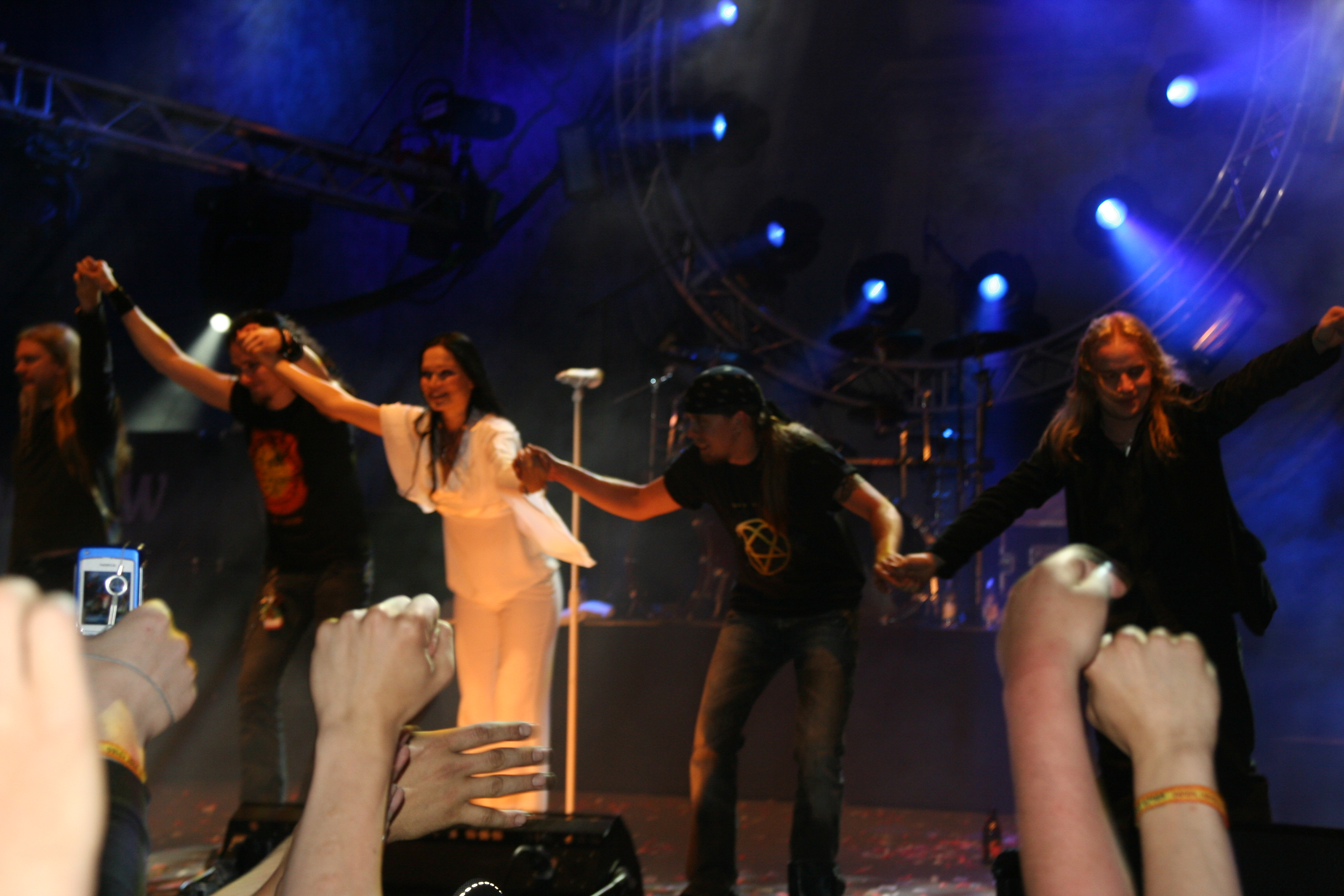
Turunen with Nightwish at the Himos Festival in Jämsä, Finland, on 25 June 2005

In December 1996, former classmate Tuomas Holopainen invited Turunen to join his new acoustic mood music project, and she immediately agreed. At the recording session for the first demo Holopainen discovered that due to her classical singing lessons, Turunen's voice had become much more powerful than he recalled from their school days. At the following band practices, Emppu Vuorinen used an electric guitar instead of an acoustic guitar because he felt that it gave a better accompaniment to her voice. Holopainen later explained that the band members had gradually realised that Turunen's voice had become too dramatic for acoustic mood music and eventually came to the conclusion that the music had to be massive too. Hence Holopainen decided to form Nightwish as a metal band.

Nightwish recorded a second demo with "more bombastic, dramatic" songs in September 1997. Holopainen used this material to convince the Finnish label Spinefarm Records to publish the band's debut album, Angels Fall First. The success of the first album came as a surprise to the label. As the album hit the top 40 of the Finnish charts, Nightwish started touring in clubs around Finland. That same year, Turunen performed at the Savonlinna Opera Festival for the first time, singing arias from Wagner and Verdi.

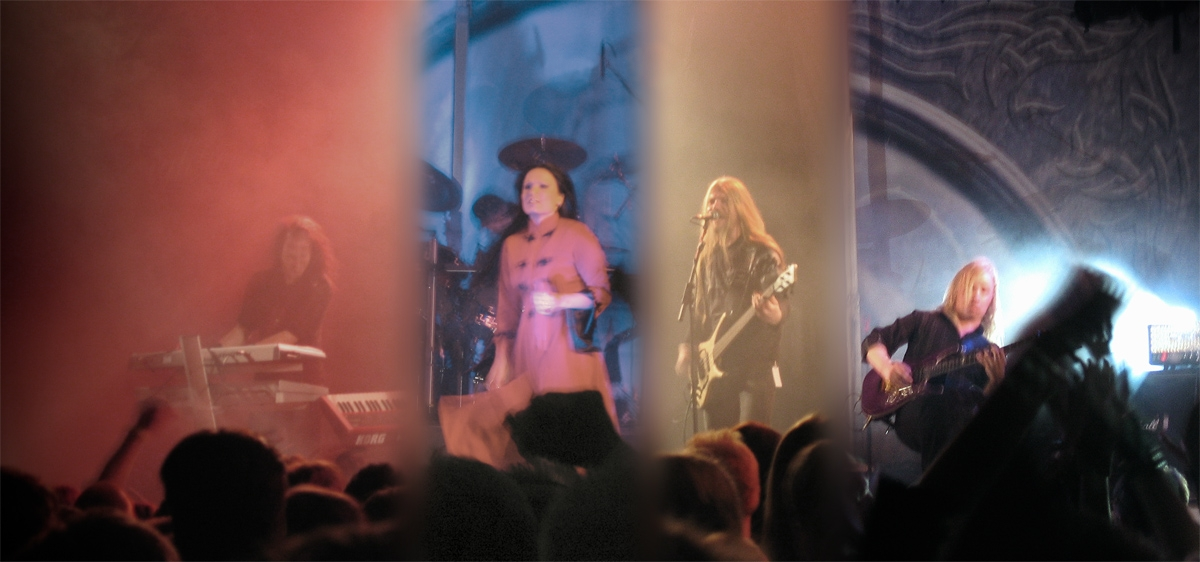
Turunen with Nightwish in Kitee, Finland, on 22 May 2004

Due to her commitment to the band, Turunen was not able to concentrate sufficiently on her schoolwork and her academic studies were interrupted. In 1998, Nightwish published their second album, Oceanborn. This album lacked the earlier elements of folk and ambient music, and instead focused on fast, melodic keyboard and guitar lines and Turunen's dramatic voice. In addition to the Nightwish tour in 1999, Turunen sang solo in Waltari's rock-themed ballet Evankeliumi (also known as Evangelicum) in several sold-out performances at the Finnish National Opera. In 2000 and 2001, Nightwish recorded Wishmaster and Over the Hills and Far Away and toured Europe and South America. During the Wishmaster World Tour, Turunen met Argentine businessman Marcelo Cabuli, owner of the record label and tour promotion company NEMS Enterprises, whom she married in 2002.

Turunen enrolled in 2000 at the German music university Hochschule für Musik Karlsruhe to gain a professional qualification as a soloist with further specialization in art song. In addition to the good reputation of the university, Turunen chose to go to Karlsruhe because some people at the Finnish university did not take her seriously as a classical singer due to her commitment in a metal band. While there, she recorded vocals for Nightwish's 2002 album Century Child and for Beto Vázquez Infinity. As with the other albums, Holopainen wrote the pieces and sent Turunen the lyrics and a demo recording of the prerecorded instrumental tracks by mail. Using the demo, Turunen designed her vocal lines and the choral passages.

In 2002, Turunen toured South America, performing in the classical Lied concert Noche Escandinava (Scandinavian Night) to sold-out houses. Following this and an exhausting world tour in support of Century Child, Nightwish took a hiatus and Turunen returned to Karlsruhe to finish her studies. After the hiatus Nightwish recorded the album Once; it was released in May 2004. The album has sold platinum in Finland and Germany and was the best selling album in all of Europe in July 2004. The band performed in the supporting Once Upon a Tour throughout 2004 and 2005.

For Christmas 2004, Turunen released her first solo single, titled "Yhden enkelin unelma" (One Angel's Dream), which sold gold in her native country of Finland. At Christmas 2005 it made a reentry at position one in the Finnish Charts. In spring 2005 she prepared the duet "Leaving You for Me", a collaboration with Martin Kesici, accompanied by a video.

==== Departure from the band ====
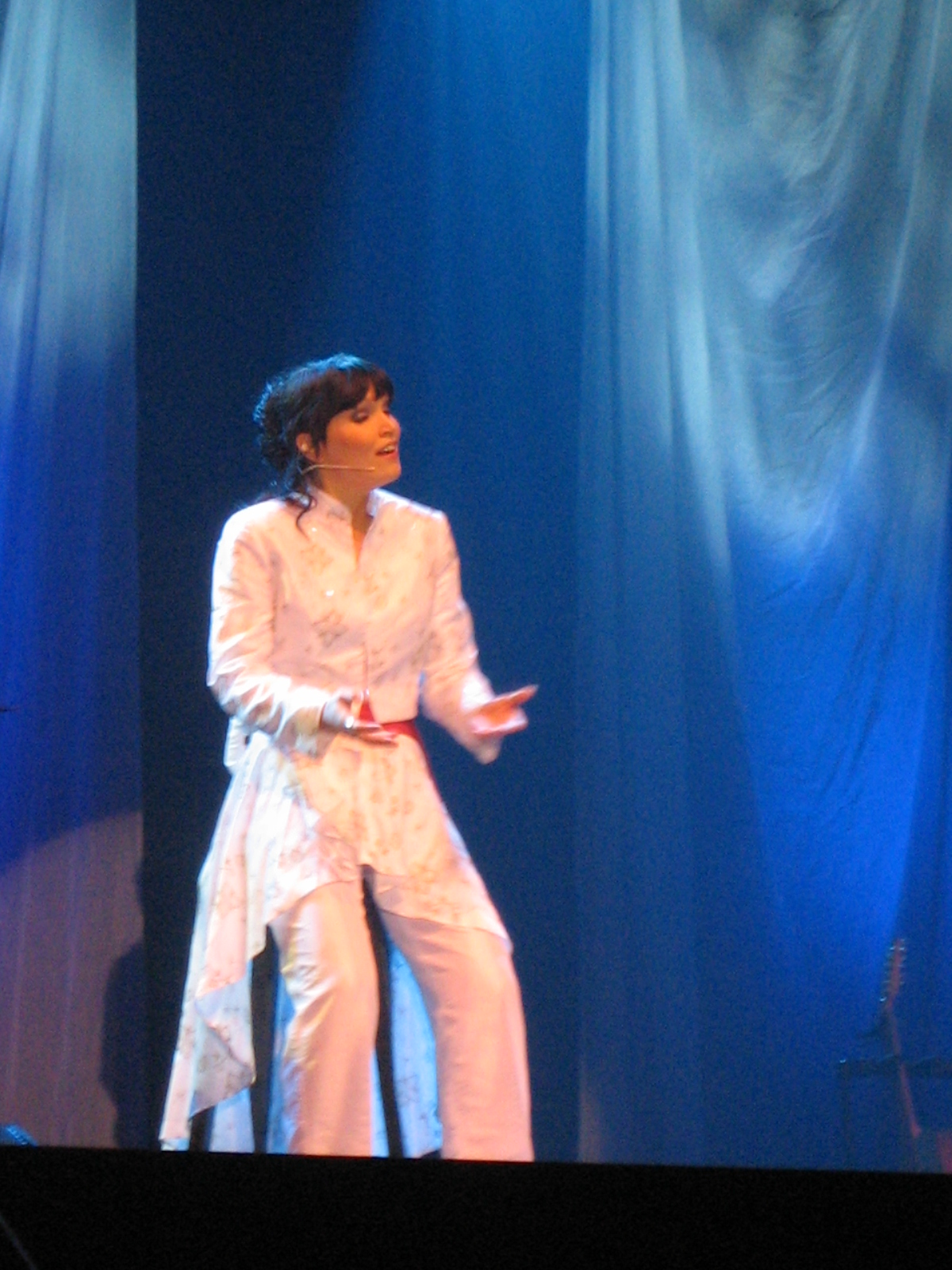
Turunen live during a Christmas concert in Lahti, Finland, on 12 December 2006

The first change in the line up of Nightwish was in September 2001, when bassist Sami Vänskä was fired because Holopainen was no longer able to continue working with him. In the following years, the relationship between Holopainen and Turunen's husband and manager Marcelo Cabuli deteriorated. This affected the relationship between Holopainen and Turunen as well. At a band meeting after the concert in Oberhausen in December 2004, Turunen informed the band members that she wanted to leave the band, but agreed to record one more album and to participate in the subsequent tour, planned for 2006/2007. According to her husband, Turunen had further agreed not to make her decision public and to release her first solo album after the new studio album from Nightwish. After the last concert of the Once Upon a Tour on 21 October 2005 (which was released on video as End of an Era), Holopainen and the other band members informed Turunen in an open letter that the band did not want to work with her any more, accusing her of diva-like behaviour and greed:

To you, unfortunately, business, money, and things that have nothing to do with those emotions have become much more important.

The split and, due to the open letter's allegations, Turunen's character became the subject of close media coverage. Turunen responded through an open letter on her website and through some interviews in which she explained her view. She was upset that after nine years of working together, Holopainen announced the separation via an open letter. Because of the continuing media interest, her husband Marcelo Cabuli posted a message addressing the situation on the website in February 2006. He asked that anyone who had questions should email him. In June 2006, Cabuli posted a lengthy reply to many of the questions he had received. He answered questions related to the greed accusation by explaining that the band had agreed on the distribution of earnings in a contract at the formation of Nightwish. Based on that contract, every band member got a fixed share of 20% of the band's income. Marcelo Cabuli stated that, unlike others, Turunen had never fought for additional songwriter royalties.

For sure in her case, money is not coming first in her book of life. [...] If we would check which band member earns a lot more money than any other one in the band, you should be surprised.

— Marcelo Cabuli

Despite the circumstances of the separation, Holopainen's appreciation of Turunen as an artist remained. He explained that he did not search for a similarly trained singer as a successor for Turunen because he considers her to be extraordinarily good in her genre and therefore irreplaceable. Turunen said in an interview that she is very proud of her career with Nightwish. She considers the remaining band members extremely talented and wished all the best for them and their subsequent then-lead singer Anette Olzon.

=== 2005–2009: Solo career beginnings, Henkäys ikuisuudesta, My Winter Storm ===
At the end of 2005, Turunen performed several classical concerts in Finland, Germany, Spain, and Romania. Since she expected to participate in another Nightwish album, several concerts and the release of her Christmas album Henkäys ikuisuudesta (officially translated as Breath from Heaven) were the only activities scheduled for 2006. Turunen again played at the Savonlinna Opera Festival in July 2006, this time as the main act; she sang alongside Finnish tenor Raimo Sirkiä, supported by the Kuopio Symphonic Orchestra. Turunen performed classical arias like "O mio babbino caro" by Puccini, "Libiamo ne' lieti calici" by Verdi and some songs from Andrew Lloyd Webber—"Don't Cry for Me Argentina" and "Phantom of the Opera"—among other songs. In November she performed at the charity concert "Tomorrow's Child" with the Tapiola Choir as a benefit for the UNICEF Children's Fund. On 6 December 2006, Turunen performed a big concert at the Sibelius Hall in Lahti, Finland; it was broadcast live by the Finnish channel YLE TV2 for 450,000 viewers. She was nominated for the Finnish Emma Award as Best Soloist of 2006. The following year, Turunen recorded vocals for the track "In the Picture" on the Nuclear Blast All-stars album Into the Light.

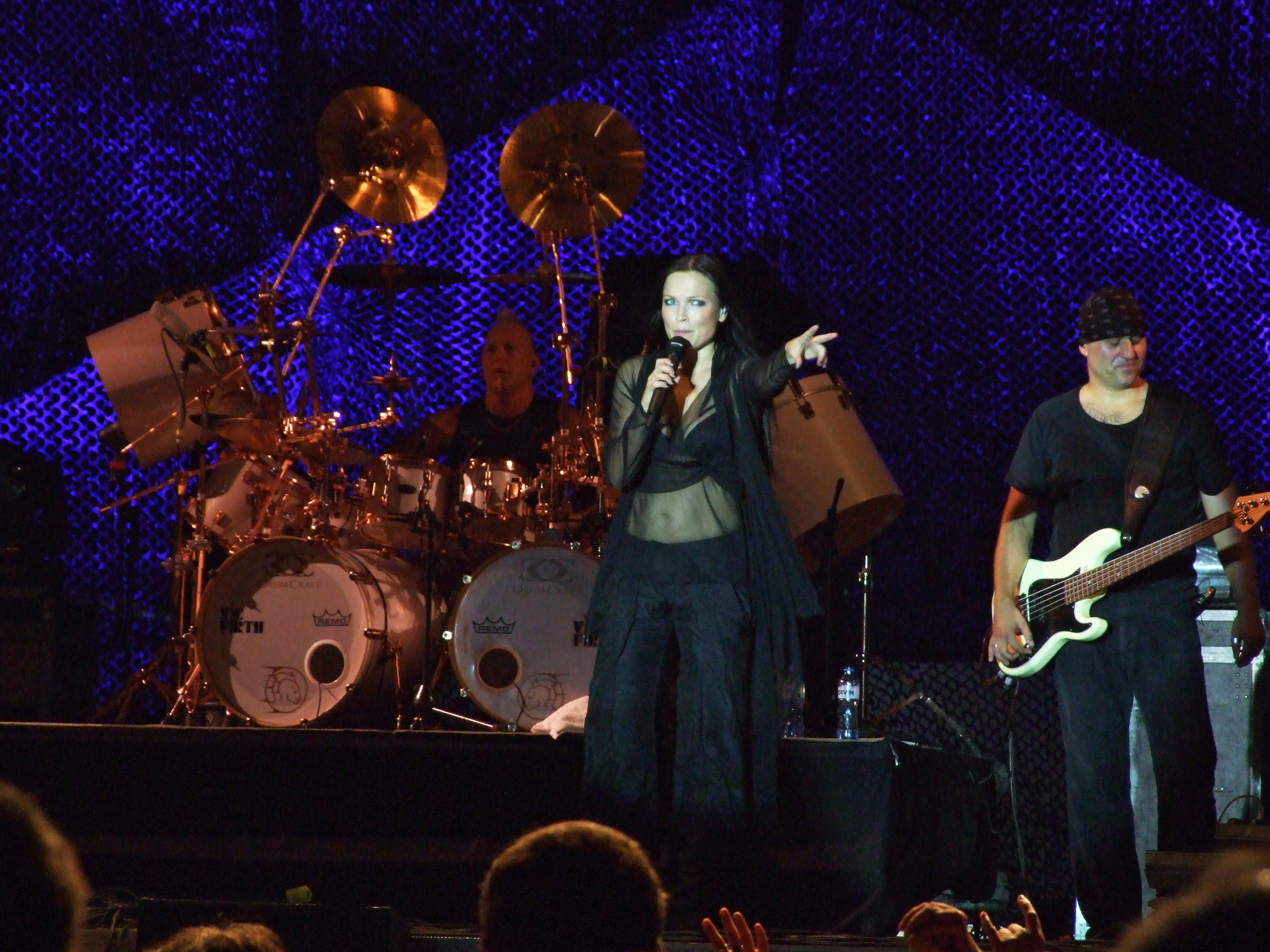
Turunen live in Kavarna, Bulgaria, 23 July 2010

In August 2006 she started to work on her next solo album, My Winter Storm, the beginning of her main solo project. It was the first time that Turunen had written songs. She was supported by some professional songwriters. The choir and orchestral arrangements were written by film music composer James Dooley. Turunen released My Winter Storm, an album featuring various styles, including symphonic metal with classical "operatic" lead vocals, in November 2007. The album took the number one spot on the Finnish charts, and went platinum in Finland double platinum in Russia and gold in Germany.

She was nominated for an Echo as best newcomer and an Emma for best Finnish artist. On 25 November 2007, Turunen embarked on the Storm World Tour to promote My Winter Storm. She performed 95 concerts throughout Europe, North and South America and ended the tour in October 2009 at the O2 Academy Islington in London. In December 2008, the EP The Seer was released in the UK and the new extended edition of My Winter Storm released in January 2009.

She also contributed three songs to the Finnish charity Christmas album Maailman kauneimmat joululaulut (Finnish for "The World's Most Beautiful Christmas Songs") released in November 2009. In December 2009 she recorded her vocal part for the song "The Good Die Young", a duet with Klaus Meine which is included on the Scorpions album Sting in the Tail.

=== 2010–2014: What Lies Beneath, Colours in the Dark ===
Turunen recorded her third album, What Lies Beneath, in 2009 and 2010; it was released in September 2010. The album combined metal with classical "operatic" elements in an out of the box approach. She started the What Lies Beneath World Tour performing in several festivals, including the Wacken Open Air and the Graspop Metal Meeting, with special concerts at Miskolc Opera Festival and at the Masters of Rock, where she performed accompanied by a full orchestra. The tour lasted until April 2012. Also in 2010 she supported Alice Cooper on the German leg of his Theatre of Death Tour.

On 17 July 2011, she sang again at the Savonlinna Opera Festival along with acclaimed tenor José Cura and accompanied by the Kuopio Symphony Orchestra.

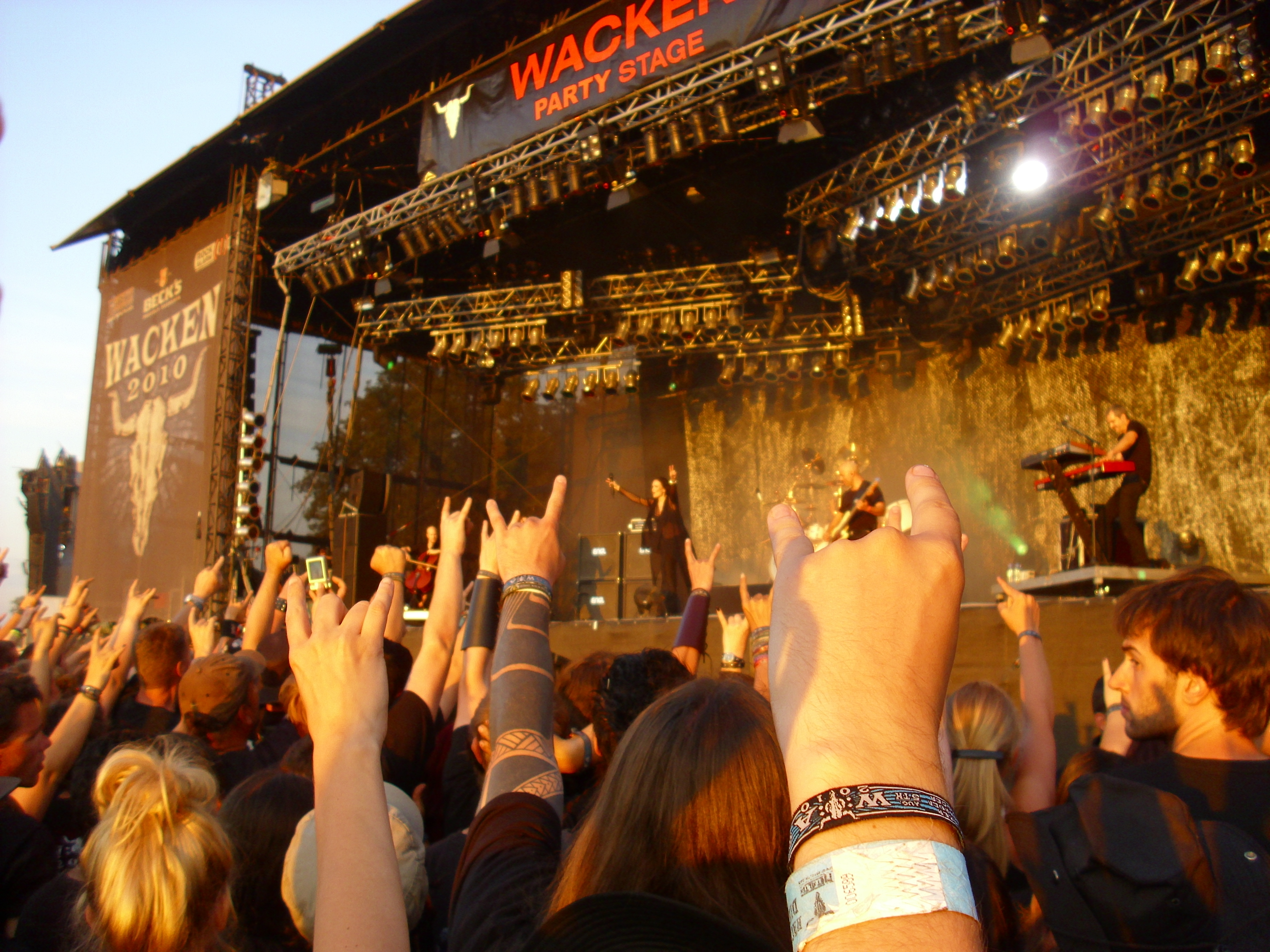
Turunen with her support band at the Wacken Open Air, 6 August 2010

In March 2012, Turunen won the title "Europe's best crossover performer" with over 100,000 votes.

In May 2013, Turunen announced the title of her 4th solo album, Colours in the Dark, which was released on 30 August. On 31 May the song "Never Enough" was released as a teaser. Later this year, in September, it was revealed that Turunen would appear as guest vocalist on the title track and video of Within Temptation's EP Paradise, released on 27 September.

In January 2014, Turunen revealed through her blog that she would soon return to the studio and record vocals for a couple of songs for her Outlanders project together with Torsten Stenzel & Walter Giardino.

In May 2014, it was released the DVD Beauty and the Beat, providing live footage from 3 concerts as part of the Beauty and the Beat World Tour. The DVD shows Tarja performing live with a symphonic orchestra, choir and Mike Terrana on drums. Songs include Antonín Dvořák's "Song to the Moon" from Rusalka and Led Zeppelin's "Kashmir", and also a live version of the rarely performed song "Swanheart" from the 1998 Nightwish album Oceanborn. On the same year, in July, Left in the Dark was released as an EP containing alternative versions from Tarja's album Colours in the Dark, as well as a studio version of "Into the Sun".

=== 2015–2018: Ave Maria, The Shadow Self, From Spirits and Ghosts ===
On 22 July 2015, it was announced that Tarja would be releasing her first fully classical album, Ave Maria – En Plein Air. The album features various different renditions of "Ave Maria", including Tarja's own composition. A teaser trailer was released on 6 August 2015, and a music video was released on 13 August 2015, with Tarja singing "Ave Maria" by Paolo Tosti.

On 17 October 2015, Tarja performed two new songs from her then-forthcoming album, "No Bitter End" and "Goldfinger", which is a cover of Shirley Bassey's song from the titular James Bond film.

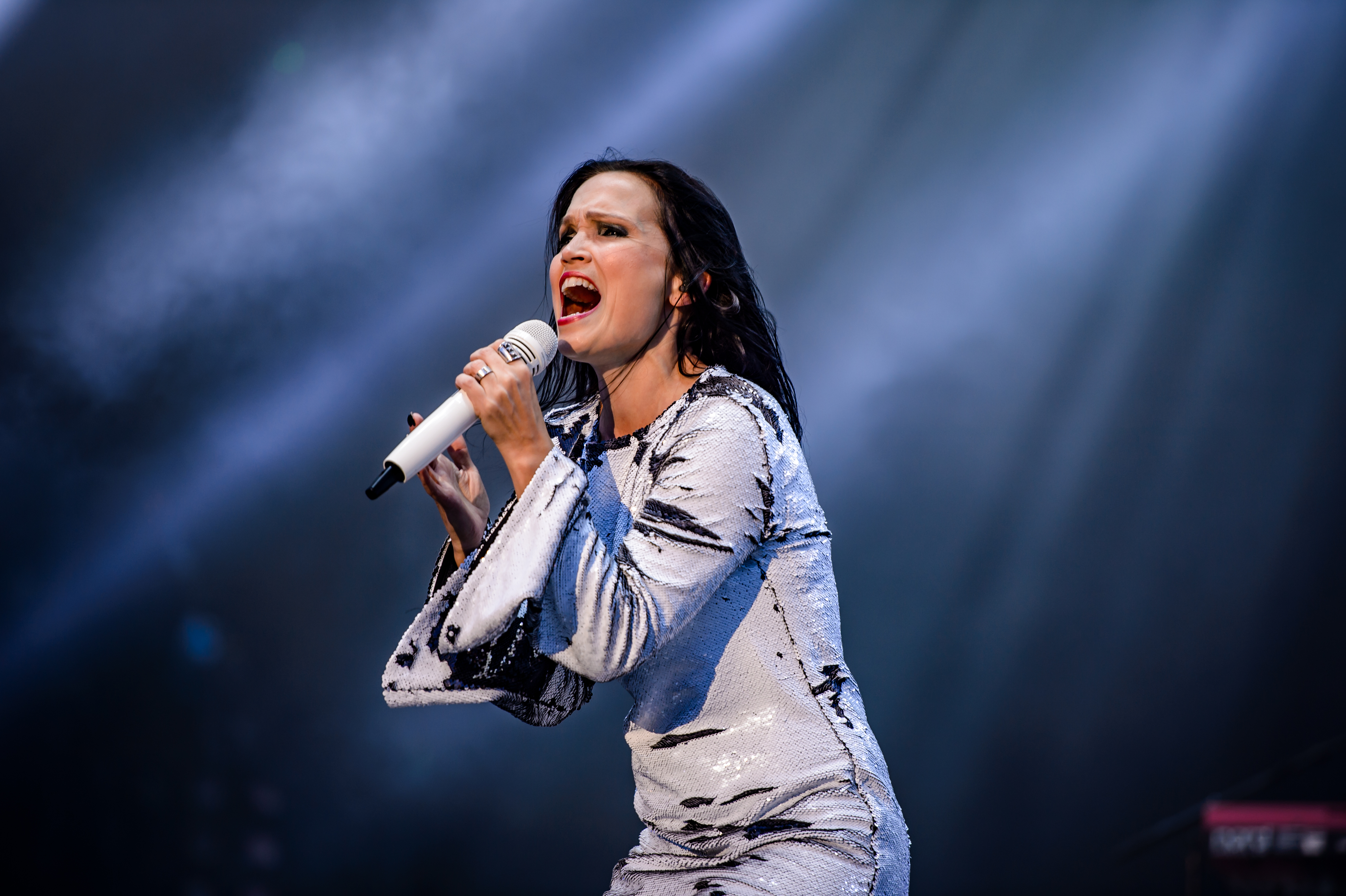
Turunen performing at Wacken Open Air, 2016

Tarja announced she is to release a new album in the summer of 2016. She explains that "she has been working hard once again with Tim Palmer to create the heaviest sound so far of her career for her fourth rock album". She also explained that the album will follow in the same footsteps as her other albums but with a new soul and growth. A teaser with a snippet of two songs was then released on her official YouTube channel. On 17 February 2016, Tarja also revealed the first letter of the album name to be T. On 14 March 2016, Tarja made public title and cover of her new album, The Shadow Self.

On 7 April, Tarja announced the release, scheduled for 3 June, of The Brightest Void, the "prequel" of The Shadow Self; The Brightest Void contains the song "No Bitter End", also included in The Shadow Self, the duet with Within Temptation "Paradise (What About Us?)" and several covers.

The Shadow Self was released on 5 August 2016. The lead single was the track "Innocence".

On 17 November 2017, Tarja released From Spirits and Ghosts (Score for a Dark Christmas), her second classical and Christmas album. With the album release comes also Tarja Turunen's first graphic novel, From Spirits and Ghosts (Novel for a Dark Christmas). The 40-page novel is about the world of dark Christmas scripted by Peter Rogers with accompanying art by Conor Boyle.

On 27 July 2018, Tarja released Act II, a live album and DVD recorded during the concert on 29 November 2016, at the Teatro della Luna in Milan, during the world tour The Shadow Shows.

=== 2019–present: In the Raw, Dark Christmas and Frisson Noir ===
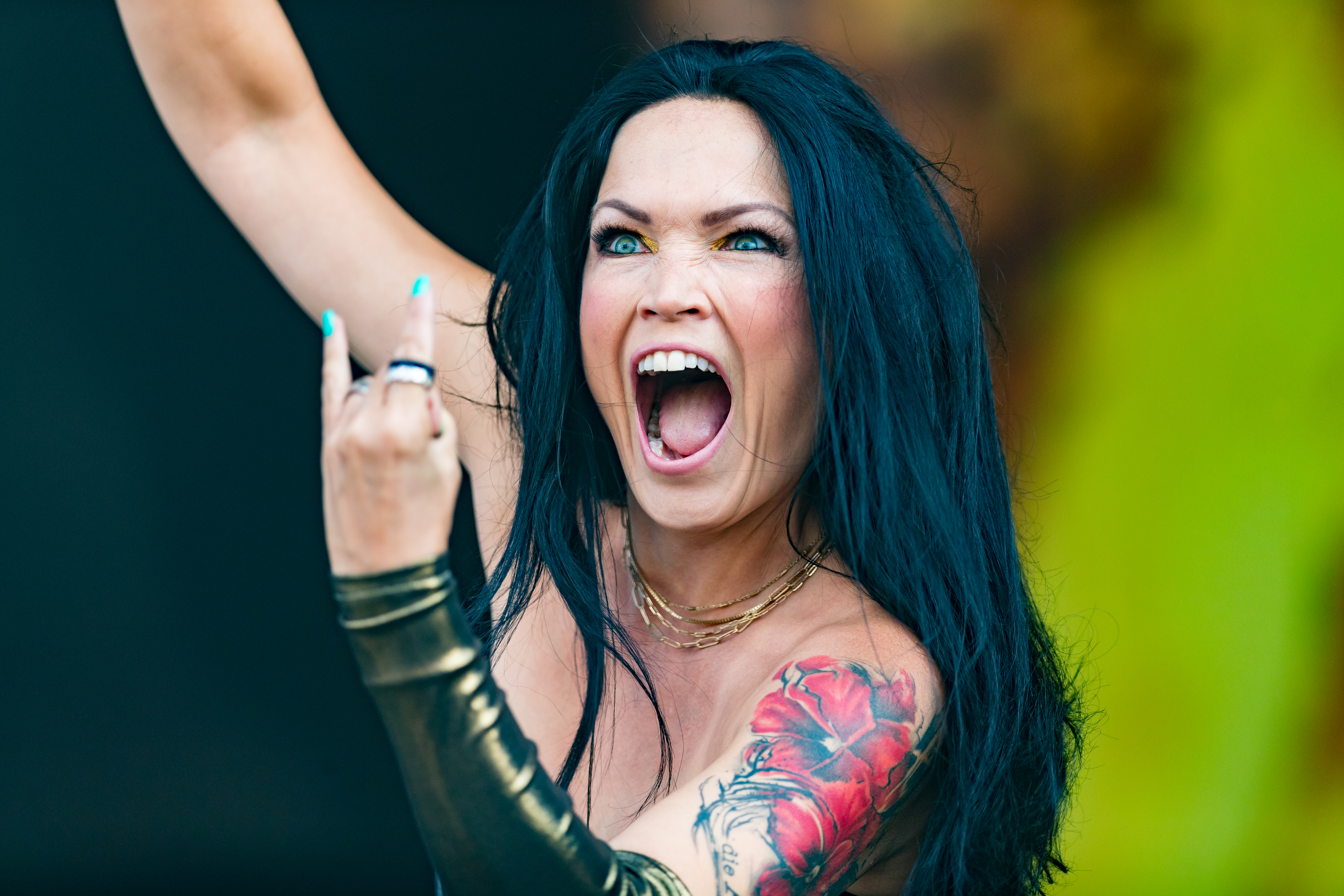
Turunen at Wacken Open Air 2022

On 30 August 2019, Tarja released In the Raw. For this album Tarja Turunen joined forces with other Heavy Metal vocalists such as Björn Strid, Tommy Karevik, and Cristina Scabbia, thus including in the album vocal collaborations with them.

On 19 June 2021, Tarja announced the release of a book in October 2021, Singing in My Blood in which the book would share the story of her life in music.

At the end of 2021, Tarja launched the ten-year project called Outlanders which combines her vocals with electronic beats, and featuring guest artists such as Yes guitarist Trevor Rabin and jazz guitarist Al Di Meola. Tarja confirmed in an interview on 15 August 2022, that not only was she working on two albums for 2023, she stated that there will be a new album at the end of 2022.

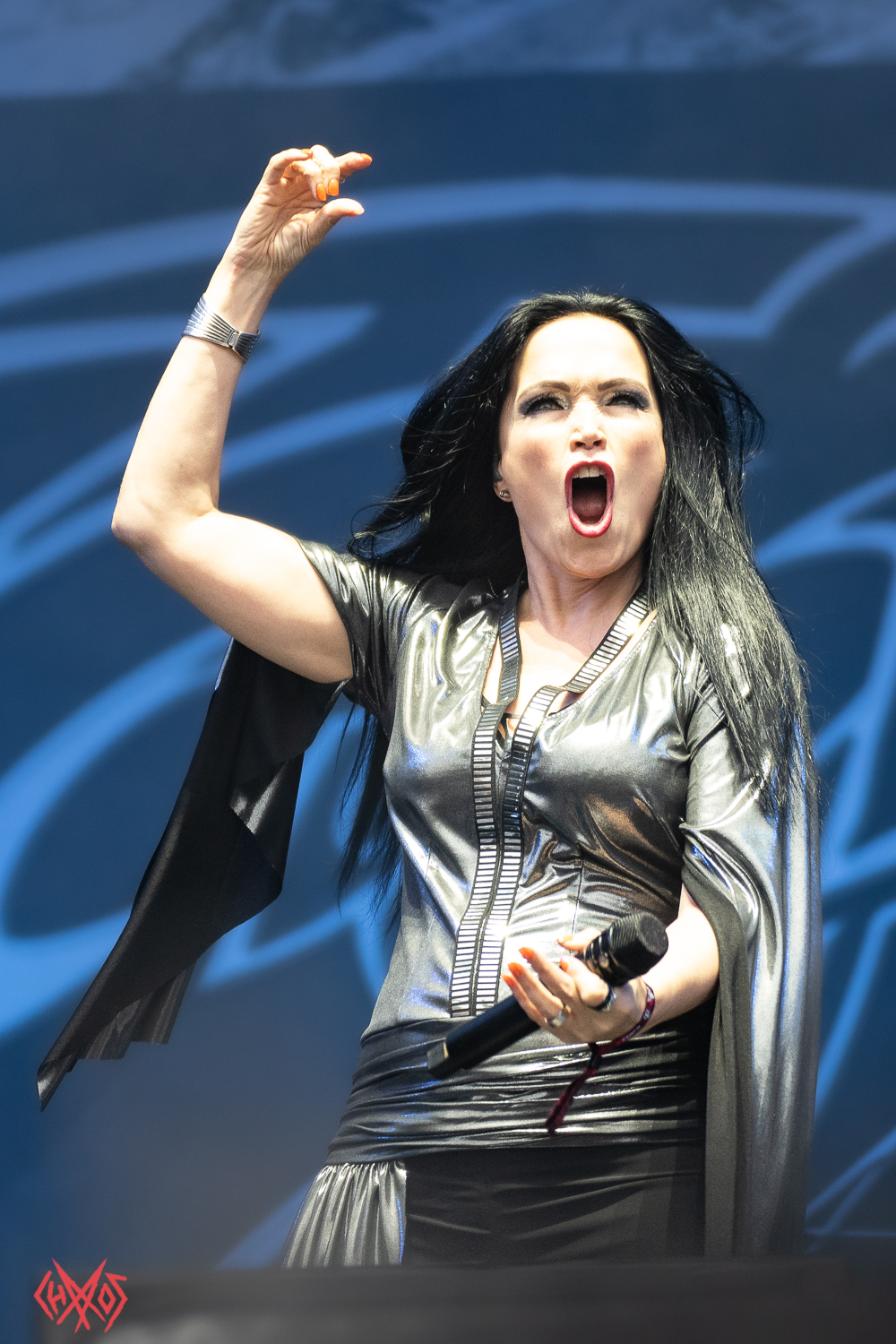
Turunen at Wacken Open Air 2025

On 2 December 2022, Tarja released her first compilation album, Best of: Living the Dream in many formats to celebrate her 15-year solo career. She later announced the beginning of the Living the Dream Tour in support of the compilation album, starting in the United States. The tour lasted until 2026, and later runs of the tour included former Nightwish member Marko Hietala as a special guest.

In 2023, Tarja released three studio albums. On 14 June 2023, Tarja announced her next live album, Rocking Heels: Live at Metal Church. The new live album was released on 11 August 2023 by earMUSIC and is the first release of the live series "Rocking Heels". The album contains live recordings of her private performance which opened Wacken Open Air in 2016. The live album contains multiple metal covers, such as Linkin Park's "Numb" and Metallica's "The Unforgiven", as well as Tarja's own original music and a Nightwish cover. On 23 June 2023, Tarja and EDM producer Torsten Stenzel released their self-titled debut studio album under the moniker of Outlanders. Tarja also released her third Christmas album, Dark Christmas on 10 November 2023. Dark Christmas acts as the sequel to her 2017 Christmas album From Spirits and Ghosts (Score for a Dark Christmas).

Tarja released the single "Left on Mars" on 14 March 2024, a collaboration with former Nightwish bandmate Marko Hietala, whom she toured with for the Living the Dream Tour. 2024 also saw the release of Tarja's ninth live album, Rocking Heels: Live at Hellfest on 6 December 2024, the second release in the "Rocking Heels" live album series. It was announced on 27 September 2024 with the release of the single "Supremacy". The album contains the live recordings of her setlist at Hellfest 2016. The second single "Ciaran's Well" was released on 25 October 2024.

In 2025, Tarja announced her tenth live album and sixth video album Circus Life, which contains the live recordings of her January 2020 show in Bucharest, Romania. The album was announced with the release of the first single, "Shadow Play" on the same day. The show was a part of a special two-night show series titled "The Best of Tarja: A Night to Remember". The show was performed on a circus-like "in the round" stage, and features sixteen guest orchestral instrumentalists, as well as guest singers Clémentine Delauney, Toni Turunen, and Chiara Tricarico. The video album was previously released and included on physical editions of Best of: Living the Dream in 2022. The second single, "Diva", was released on 4 April 2025.

Turunen announced her tenth studio album, Frisson Noir, on 16 March 2026. It was released on 12 June 2026.

== Singing style ==
=== Development ===
Along with visiting the music school in Savonlinna, Turunen began serious classical vocal training at 17. After school, she began studying music (with a specialization in church music) at the Sibelius Academy. When she began singing, she could "shatter a lamp" with her voice. Due to her commitment with Nightwish, she had to interrupt her academic studies.

From 2001 to 2003, she studied at the music academy Hochschule für Musik Karlsruhe, where she trained as a soloist with further specialization in art songs. Turunen originally applied to train as a choir singer. At the audition she attracted the attention of professor Mitsuko Shirai, who encouraged Turunen to apply for soloist training.

As a classical singer, Turunen sings with classical vocal technique. She explained that in the early days of Nightwish, it was difficult to combine classical technique with the metal sound in a way that gave her liberty of action without damaging her vocal cords. Classical techniques helped her to play with her voice, so she decided not to pursue extra training in rock/pop singing.

Towards the turn of the millennium, the combination of hard and fast guitar riffs with classical female lead vocals attracted a great deal of attention in the metal scene. The new music style of Nightwish quickly achieved critical and commercial popularity; this symphonic metal style was soon dubbed "opera metal". Turunen does not see herself as an opera singer. She has sung excerpts from operas in her classical tours and has performed multiple times at the Savonlinna Opera Festival, but she stresses that singing opera cannot be performed as a side project. She would need special training to perfectly sing an entire opera without a microphone.

When asked how the association between the opera and metal genres may have arisen, Turunen said that despite the obvious differences, the two music styles have some similarities:

The scenes are very similar. There are many people who would never go to an opera and the same goes for metal. But the real fans are incredibly loyal. And both styles are bombastic and express strong emotions.

— Tarja Turunen, Metal Hammer interview, July 2002

From the first Nightwish album Angels Fall First (1997) on, critics described Turunen's vocals using adjectives such as angelic or valkyrian. The Valkyrie image was later fostered by the second video for the single "Sleeping Sun" in which Turunen walks on a battlefield as if she were guiding the dead warriors.

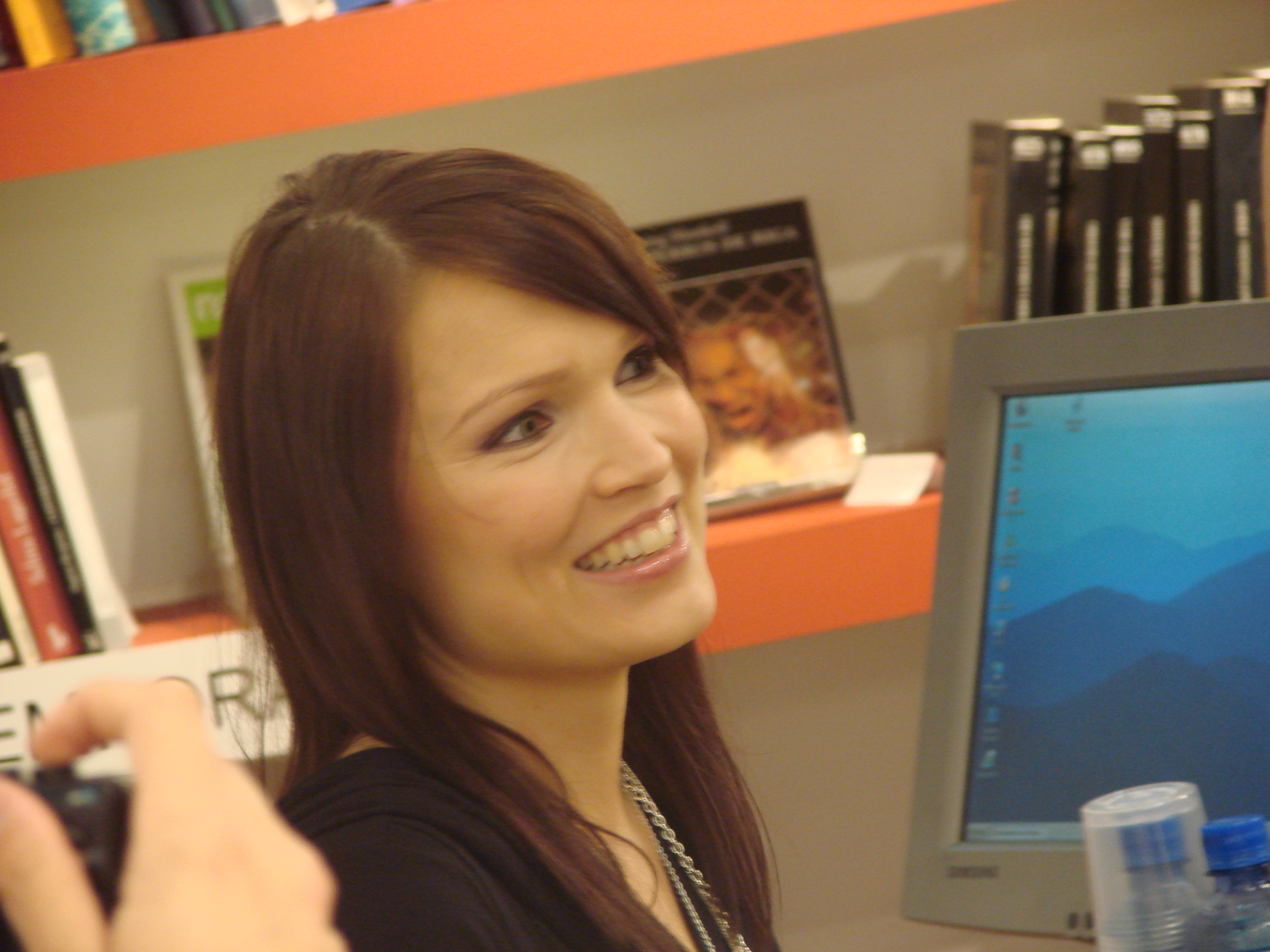
Turunen at the International Book Fair in Buenos Aires, Argentina, 3 May 2007

On the following albums the singing was technically more complex. On the Nightwish album Oceanborn (1998), her classical vocal training was much more noticeable. For the song "Passion and the Opera", Turunen performed a staccato coloratura reminiscent of the aria "Hell's vengeance boils in my heart", sung by the soprano role Queen of the Night in Mozart's opera The Magic Flute. "Sleeping Sun" required a well-trained breathing technique. Turunen explained in an interview that when they recorded Oceanborn, she had serious doubts, fearing that she was not yet advanced enough in her studies to have mastered the required techniques.

A challenge of a different kind was the cover version of Gary Moore's "Over the Hills and Far Away" (2001), as it required a deeper voice, far below the vocal range of an average soprano. In an interview with Breakout magazine, she reported that in the studio, the band members were shaken by a paroxysm of laughter as she tried to warm up for the vocal lines. As a side benefit of her efforts, Turunen gradually expanded her vocal range considerably into the lower range, which manifested even more on the following albums.

For the album Century Child (2002), she experimented with a more "rock" sounding voice, where she maintained the classical singing technique, but, for example, sang with less vibrato. Turunen was not satisfied that she had successfully transitioned to this new style until the album Once (2004).

I feel very comfortable with Once because I have tried to change my singing style with Nightwish already since Century Child because Tuomas requested that, the songs requested that ... It has been hard work and I didn't manage to do that on Century Child, I was not very happy with it. On Once it's all very natural, how I'm singing and what I'm singing. But as I said, it has been really hard work because I've been a classical singer for the last ten years so it was hard to start over again and think of different styles. Of course I'm always singing with my classical techniques, I never sing with my poor speaking voice – I cannot do that anymore.

— Tarja Turunen, Metal Temple interview, October 2004

This deeper "rock"-sounding voice on Once—as well as on the song "In the Picture" of the album Into the Light—was welcomed by critics as a 'refreshing' change.

Her first solo album My Winter Storm (2007) contains rock and metal songs as well as songs that resemble classical songs. Turunen uses both her classical singing voice and a rock-sounding voice. In many songs she starts with a rock voice, and then switches for widely arching melodies into a distinctly classical singing voice.

Tarja's classically trained voice flies bravely over orchestral sounds and brute guitars. Like a phoenix from the ashes [...] she lifts up again and again for widely arching melodies, sometimes spurred on by multi-voiced female choirs.

— Frank Rauscher, Teleschau – der Mediendienst, review of My Winter Storm

In an interview, she explained that My Winter Storm was the first album where she had the chance to use her full vocal range.

Now that I can use the whole range of my voice, it feels very nice. I have never sung so low as I did on one of the songs on the new record and there's a song on which I sang my highest notes ever! I really have used a huge range on this album, because the moods are changing in every song and this reflects that.

— Tarja Turunen, Kerrang! interview, September 2007

=== Register ===
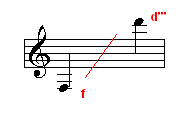
Vocal range on My Winter Storm (F_{3} to D_{6})

Turunen's voice type is soprano. Over the course of her career, Turunen has developed a vocal range of three and a half octaves. In regards to her voice, Turunen has stated:

I sang a repertoire of a mezzo-soprano for many years and because of that, still today, I have rarely quite low register for a lyrical soprano. Nowadays, I see myself as a light lyrical soprano.

— Tarja Turunen – blog entry from 1 March 2009

== Reception and legacy ==
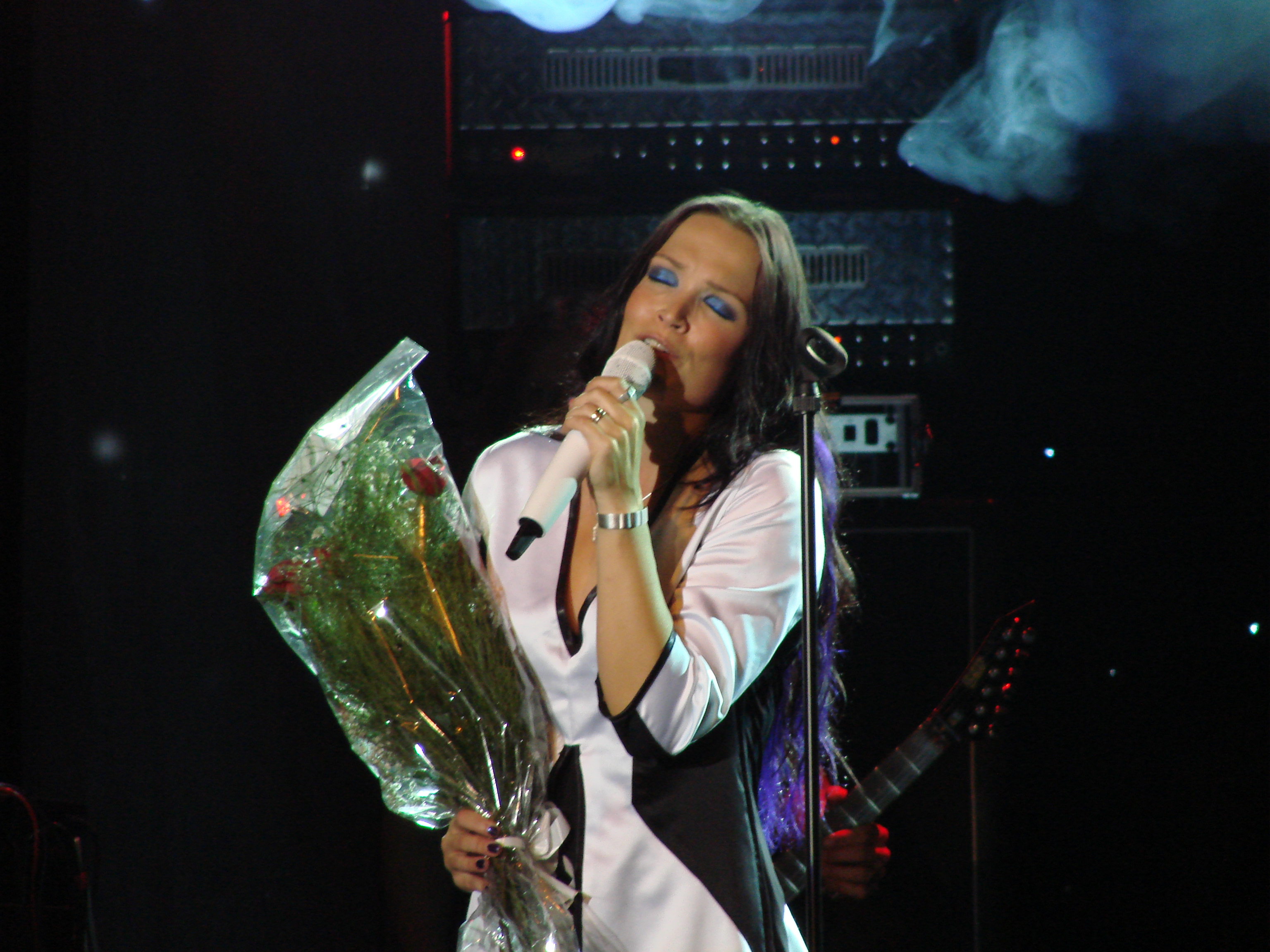
Turunen live in Buenos Aires, Argentina, 26 May 2009

Turunen's voice is described by critics as remarkably powerful and emotional. Sometimes it is stated that her voice is too trained or operatic for metal music, but even critics who do not like classical voices admit that her voice suits the kind of metal songs she sings unusually well.

Until the end of their collaboration, Turunen's singing was a trademark of Nightwish. She was known as the face and voice of Nightwish while bandleader Holopainen was the soul. Turunen was seen as a key to Nightwish's success. She is respected by other musicians of the metal genre and is an influence on their work; for instance, Simone Simons of Epica names her as her inspiration to study classical music and apply that vocal style to a metal band.

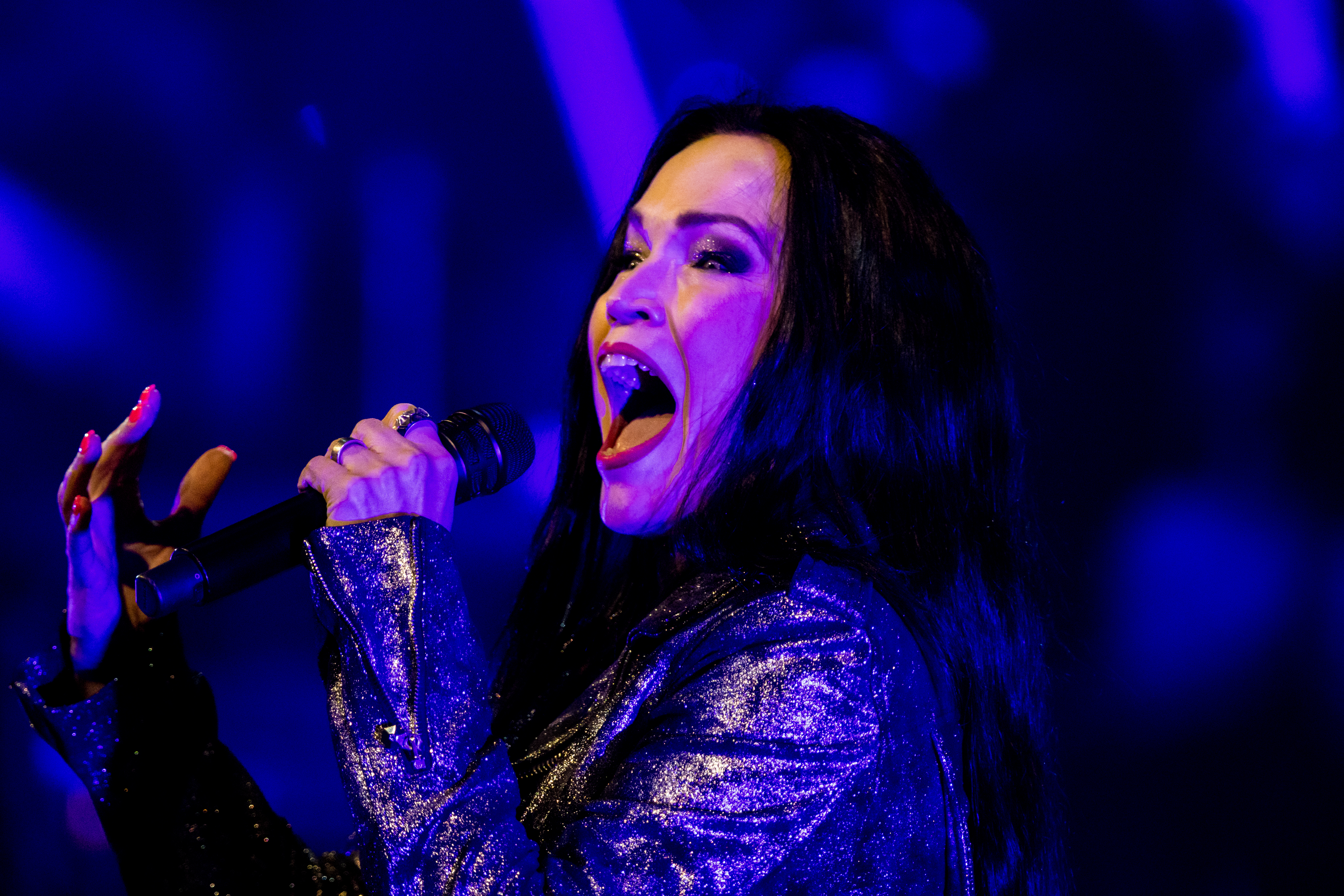
Turunen performing at Rock Meets Classic 2024

Turunen receives most of her media attention in Europe, especially in her home of Finland. In December 2003, she was invited by Finnish president Tarja Halonen to celebrate Finnish Independence Day at the Presidential Palace together with other Finnish celebrities. The event is televised annually live by the state-owned broadcaster, the Finnish Broadcasting Company. In December 2007, she performed different versions of the Finnish national anthem "Maamme" (Finnish: "Our country") accompanied by the Tapiola Sinfonietta, to celebrate the 90th anniversary of Finnish independence. The concert was televised by the Finnish Broadcasting Company for 2 million Finnish viewers. In December 2013, Turunen was the invited soloist at the Christmas Peace event in the Turku Cathedral, Finland, with the presence of Finnish president Sauli Niinistö. The concert aired on Yle TV1 at the Christmas Eve. During her solo career, Turunen has sold over 100,000 certified records in Finland, which places her among the top 50 of best-selling female soloists.

In Europe, her popularity is mainly limited to the hard rock and metal scene. She had a broader exposure on 30 November 2007, when she was invited to open the farewell fight of Regina Halmich. Her performance of "I Walk Alone" was televised live by the German television station ZDF for 8.8 million viewers. Turunen was one of the star coaches in the fourth season of The Voice of Finland in the spring of 2015 on Nelonen. After the success of the 2015 edition of The Voice of Finland, Tarja was again chosen to be one of the star coaches for the 2016 edition. In 2016 in honor of the Day of the Finnish Identity, celebrated on 12 May, Finland published a new set of official emojis, which symbolizes Finnish culture and history; among other iconic Finnish imagery there were music-related emojis, including Tarja Turunen as "The Voice".

== Personal life ==
Turunen married Argentine businessman Marcelo Cabuli on 31 December 2002 – their wedding was celebrated in July 2003; they lived in Buenos Aires with their daughter who was born in 2012. In an interview, Tarja explained that in 2016 they had plans to move back to Europe due to her touring schedule and that their daughter was starting school in the coming year. She currently lives in the south of Spain. In October 2021, she revealed that she had a stroke three years earlier after a U.S. tour.

Tarja fluently speaks Finnish, English, Spanish and German.

== Discography ==
=== Solo ===
- Henkäys ikuisuudesta (2006)
- My Winter Storm (2007)
- What Lies Beneath (2010)
- Colours in the Dark (2013)
- Ave Maria – En Plein Air (2015)
- The Shadow Self (2016)
- From Spirits and Ghosts (Score for a Dark Christmas) (2017)
- In the Raw (2019)
- Dark Christmas (2023)
- Frisson Noir (2026)

=== with Nightwish ===
- Angels Fall First (1997)
- Oceanborn (1998)
- Wishmaster (2000)
- Century Child (2002)
- Once (2004)

== Tours ==
Headlining tours

- Henkäys ikuisuudesta Tour (2006)
- Storm World Tour (2007–2009)
- What Lies Beneath World Tour (2010–2012)
- Colours on the Road (2013–2015)
- The Shadow Shows (2016–2018)
- A Nordic Symphony Tour (2018)
- The Raw Tour (2019–2023)
- Living the Dream (2024–2026)
- Frisson Live (2026)

As a support act

- Bleed Out Tour (2024)
