= List of Tarja Turunen concert tours =

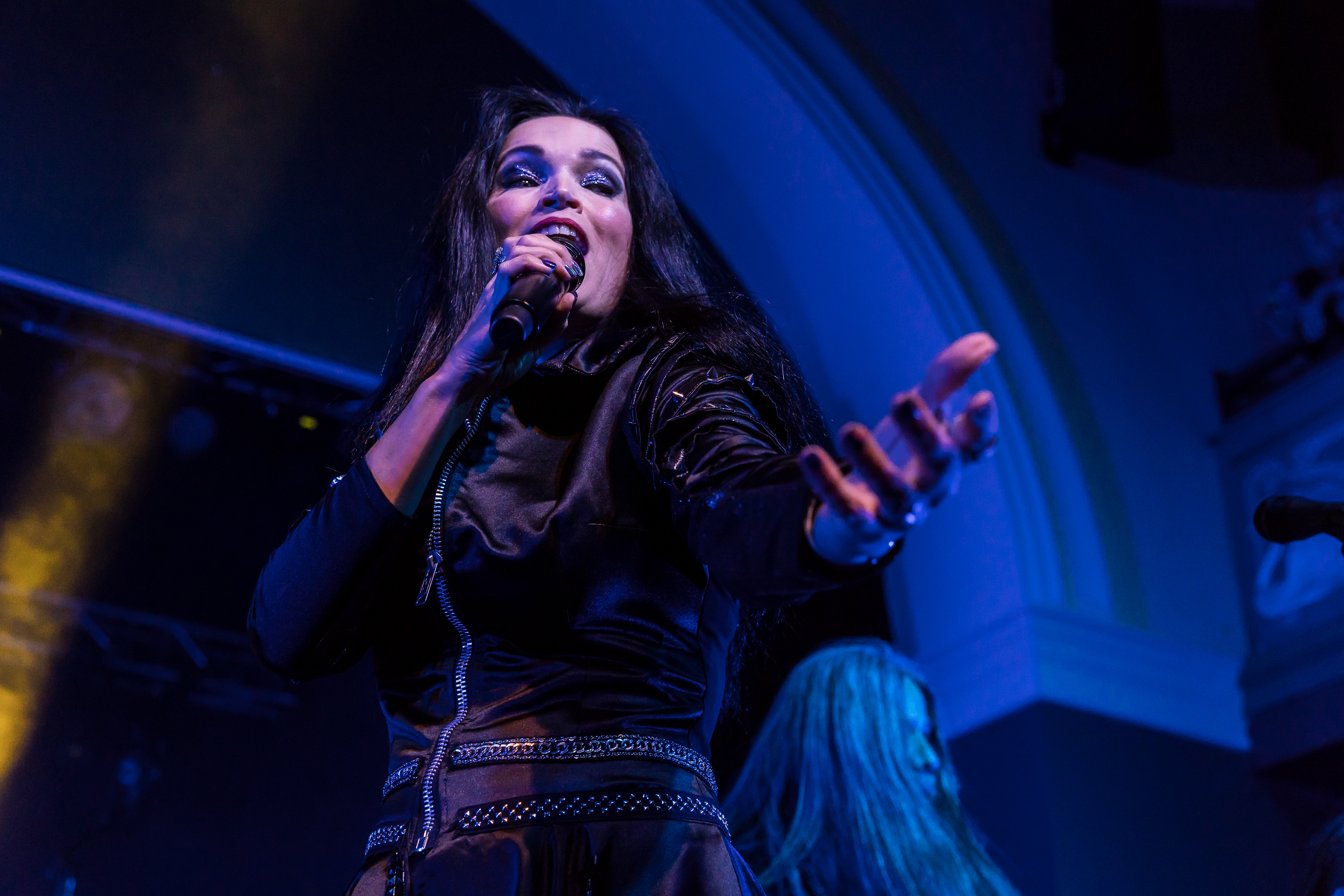
Turunen in 2024

This is the list of headlining major concert tours by Finnish singer Tarja Turunen, who is best known as the former lead vocalist for the symphonic metal band Nightwish, and has been in a solo career since 2006.

In 2004, Tarja released an independent single, "Yhden enkelin unelma, and played a few headlining Christmas shows in Europe in late 2005, later launching her solo career in 2006 with a Christmas album called Henkäys ikuisuudesta, followed in 2007 by her first metal album, My Winter Storm, accompanied by the "I Walk Alone" single, playing her first world tour in support of the album. She has kept a routine of album productions and touring, not only as a solo metal artist, with a total of five metal albums so far (the most recent being In the Raw in 2019), but also venturing into diverse styles as classical music territory, which is her official music formation, also often putting out albums and playing live tours regarding Christmas celebrations. (see Ave Maria – En Plein Air from 2015 and Score for a Dark Christmas from 2017 as examples).

Since her first headlining tour in 2006, Turunen has played over 500 concerts around the world. Turunen has toured every continent except for Oceania (though she played there with Nightwish) and Africa.

== Henkäys ikuisuudesta Tour ==
Henkäys ikuisuudesta Tour
- Tour by Tarja Turunen
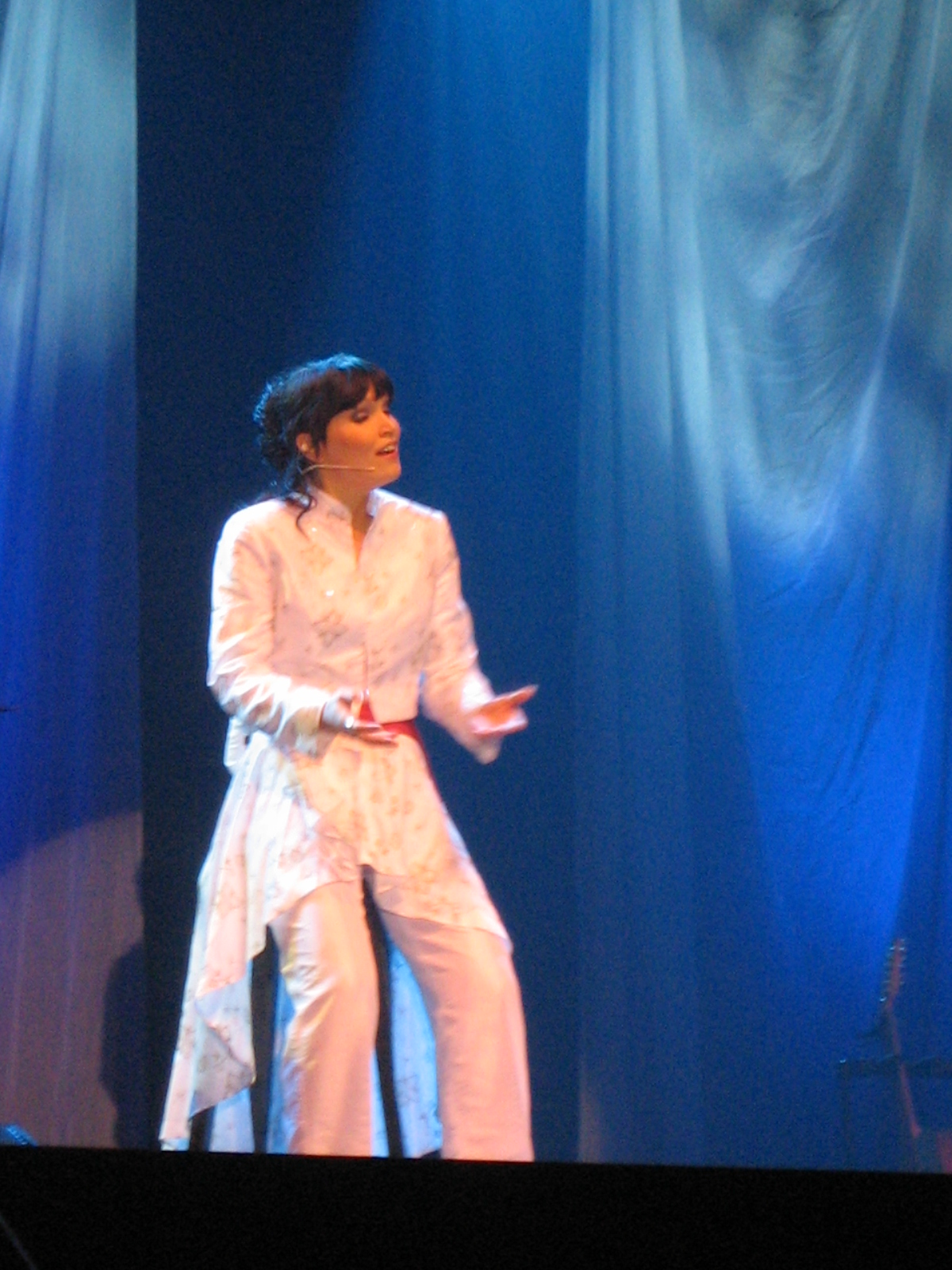
- Tarja in Joensuu in 2006
- Location: Europe
- Associated album: Henkäys ikuisuudesta
- Start date: November 25, 2006
- End date: December 20, 2006
- Legs: 1
- No. of shows: 9

Tarja Turunen concert chronology
- Henkäys ikuisuudesta Tour (2006); Storm World Tour (2007–2009)

The Henkäys ikuisuudesta Tour was a short concert tour Tarja performed based on her 2006 Christmas album, Henkäys ikuisuudesta, limited to her home country and Russia, where she enjoyed a huge popularity.

=== Songs performed ===
The shows were based on the track listing of the album, consisting mostly of covers and renditions of traditional Christmas and classical pieces. The list of songs is based on the shows in Russia in 2006.

Originals

- "Kuin Henkäys Ikuisuutta"
- "Ensimmäinen jouluinen potpuri"
- "Toinen Jouluinen Potpuri"

Covers

- "You Would Have Loved This" (Cori Connors)
- "Happy New Year" (ABBA)
- "En Etsi Valtaa, Loistoa" (Jean Sibelius)
- "Jo Joutuu Ilta" (Jean Sibelius)
- "Happy Xmas (War Is Over)" (John Lennon)
- "Varpunen Jouluaamuna" (Otto Kotilainen)
- "Ave Maria" (Franz Schubert)
- "The Eyes of a Child" (Air Supply)
- "Mökit Nukkuu Lumiset" (Heino Kaski)
- "Mary's Boy Child" (Jester Hairston)
- "Magnificar" (Bach)
- "Walking in the Air" (Howard Blake)
- "Varpunen Jouluaamuna" (Zachris Topelius)
- "Silent Night" (traditional)
- "When a Child Is Born" (traditional)

=== Tour dates ===
List of 2006 concerts, showing date, city, country and venues
Date	City	Country	Venue
25 November 2006	Helsinki	Finland	Culture Hall
3 December 2006	Joensuu	Finland	Arena
5 December 2006	Jyväskylä	Finland	Paviljönki Areena
6 December 2006	Tampere	Finland	Tampere Hall
12 December 2006	Lahti	Finland	Sibelius Hall
15 December 2006	Turku	Finland	Karibia Center
16 December 2006	Kuopio	Finland	Music Center
19 December 2006	Saint Petersburg	Russia	Lensovet Theatre
20 December 2006	Moscow	Russia	MKHAT Theater

=== Backing Band ===
The following musicians accompanied Tarja on this tour, based on the backing band on the album:

- Maria Ilmoniemi – Keyboards and piano
- Juha Lanu – Electric and acoustic guitar
- Ako Kiiski – Bass guitar
- Harri Ala-Kojola – Drums
- Iiris Pyrhönen, Heikki Hämäläinen – Violin
- Tiia Makkonen & Veli-Matti Iljin – Cello
- Mauri Pietikäinen – Viola
- Emilia Kauppinen – Flute
- Heikki Pohto – Saxophone

== Storm World Tour ==
Storm World Tour
- Tour by Tarja Turunen
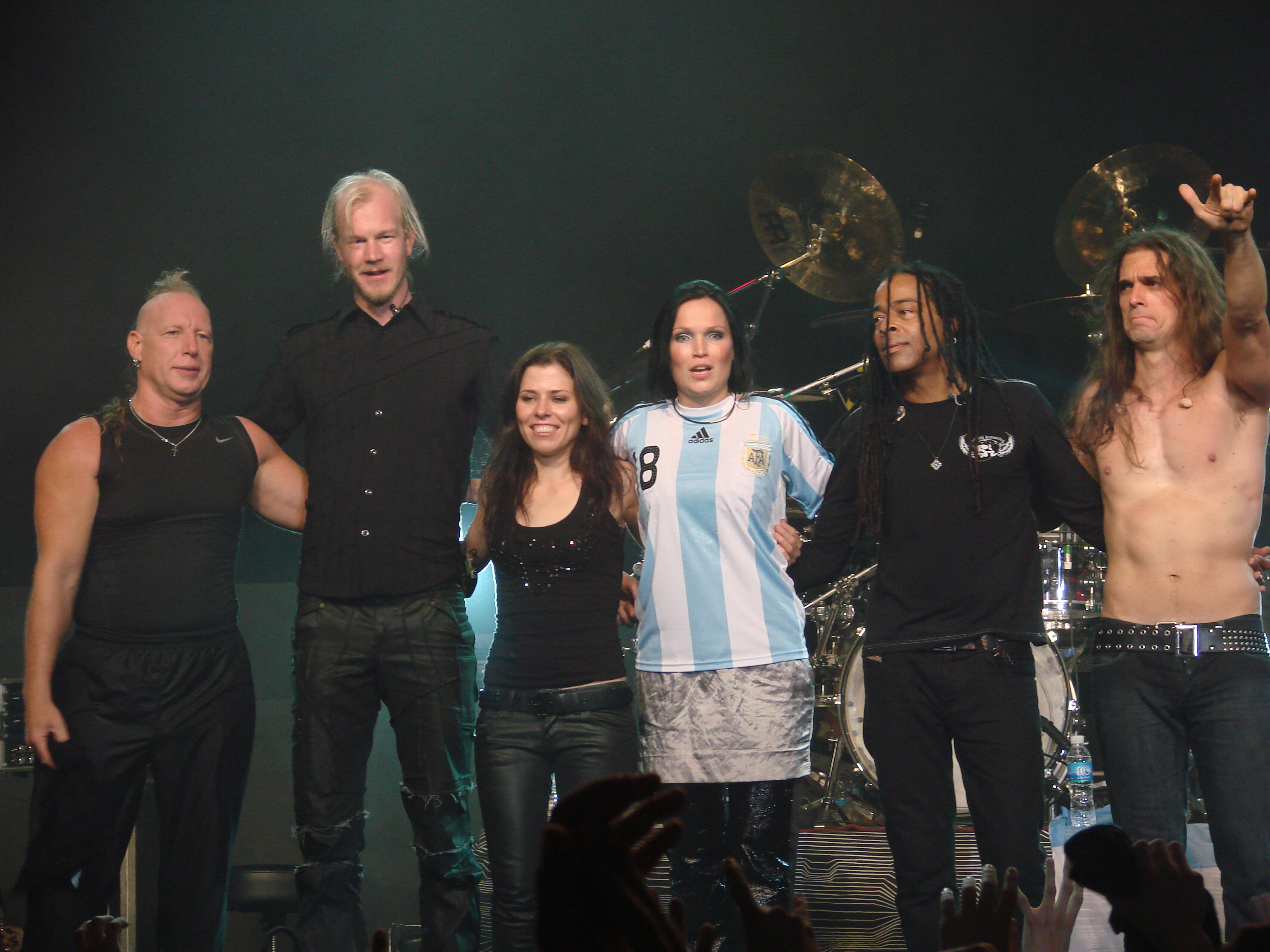
- Tarja and her backing band in Buenos Aires in 2008
- Location: Asia; Europe; North America; South America
- Associated album: My Winter Storm
- Start date: November 25, 2007
- End date: October 19, 2009
- Legs: 6
- No. of shows: 95

Tarja Turunen concert chronology
- Henkäys ikuisuudesta Tour (2006); Storm World Tour (2007–2009); What Lies Beneath World Tour (2010–2012)

=== Songs performed ===
The list of songs is based on the shows played from 2007 to 2009.

From My Winter Storm and The Seer EP

- "I Walk Alone"
- "Lost Northern Star"
- "The Reign"
- "My Little Phoenix"
- "Boy and the Ghost"
- "Sing for Me"
- "Oasis"
- "Poison" (Alice Cooper cover)
- "Our Great Divide"
- "Damned and Divine"
- "Die Alive"
- "Minor Heaven"
- "Ciarán's Well"
- "Calling Grace"
- "Enough"
- "The Seer"
- Wisdom of Wind"

From What Lies Beneath

- "If You Believe"
- "Montañas de Silencio"

Nightwish songs

- "Angels Fall First"
- "Passion and the Opera"
- "Sleeping Sun"
- "She's My Sin"
- "The Kinslayer"
- "Wishmaster"
- "Deep Silent Complete"
- "Nemo"
- "Dead Gardens"

Other covers

- "The Phantom of the Opera" (musical theme)
- "Over the Hills and Far Away" (Gary Moore)
- "Tired of Being Alone" (Schiller)
- "Symphony of Destruction" (Megadeth)
- "...and Justice for All" (Metallica)
- "Walking in the Air" (Howard Blake)
- "You Would Have Loved This" (Cori Connors)
- "Desarma y Sangra" (Serú Girán)

=== Tour dates ===
List of 2007 concerts, showing date, city, country, venue and support acts
Date	City	Country	Venue	Support act
25 November 2007	Berlin	Germany	Fritz Club	—N/a
27 November 2007	Budapest	Hungary	Petofi Csarnok	—N/a
2 December 2007	Moscow	Russia	B1 Maximum Club	—N/a
8 December 2007	Kuusankoski	Finland	Sami Hyypiä Areena	—N/a
10 December 2007	Cologne	Germany	Live Music Hall	—N/a
11 December 2007	Paris	France	Élysée Montmartre	—N/a
13 December 2007	Amsterdam	Netherlands	Melkweg	—N/a
15 December 2007	Athens	Greece	Fuzz Club	—N/a
18 December 2007	Zurich	Switzerland	X-tra Club	—N/a
20 December 2007	London	England	Electric Ballroom	—N/a

List of 2008 concerts, showing date, city, country, venue and support acts
Date	City	Country	Venue	Support act
7 May 2008	Cologne	Germany	E-Werk	Delain
9 May 2008	Leipzig	Germany	Wave-Gotik-Treffen Festival	—N/a
11 May 2008	Zlín	Czech Republic	Novesta Arena	Interitus
12 May 2008	Warsaw	Poland	Stodola Club	Martin Kesici
14 May 2008	Wiesbaden	Germany	Kulturzentrum Schlachthof	Passionworks
17 May 2008	Munich	Germany	Georg Elser Hallen	Passionworks
18 May 2008	Zurich	Switzerland	Volkshaus	Passionworks
20 May 2008	Graz	Austria	Orpheum Theatre	Passionworks
21 May 2008	Milan	Italy	Alcatraz Club	Passionworks
23 May 2008	Filderstadt	Germany	Philarmonic Hall	Passionworks
24 May 2008	Hamburg	Germany	Delphi Showpalast	Passionworks
27 May 2008	Malmö	Sweden	KB Club	Passionworks
28 May 2008	Oslo	Norway	Rockefeller Music Hall	Passionworks
30 May 2008	Goteborg	Sweden	Trädgarn Club	Passionworks
1 June 2008	Stockholm	Sweden	Tyrol Club	Passionworks
3 June 2008	Helsinki	Finland	Tavastia Club	Passionworks
14 August 2008	Monterrey	Mexico	Iguana Club	—N/a
16 August 2008	Mexico City	Mexico	Circo Volador	—N/a
17 August 2008	Guadalajara	Mexico	Teatro Estudio Cavaret	—N/a
20 August 2008	Bogotá	Colombia	Downtown Majestic	—N/a
23 August 2008	São Paulo	Brazil	Credicard Hall	Hydria
24 August 2008	Curitiba	Brazil	Hellooch Music Hall	—N/a
26 August 2008	Porto Alegre	Brazil	Opinião Club	—N/a
28 August 2008	Fortaleza	Brazil	Oasis Club	Obskure
30 August 2008	Belo Horizonte	Brazil	Lapa Multshow	—N/a
31 August 2008	Rio de Janeiro	Brazil	Canecão	Hydria
3 September 2008	Santiago	Chile	Teatro Caupolican	Six Magics
6 September 2008	Buenos Aires	Argentina	Estadio Obras Sanitarias	Luzabril
10 October 2008	Wieze	Belgium	Metal Female Voices Fest	—N/a
19 October 2008	Esch-sur-Alzette	Luxembourg	Rockhal	Salamandra; Apparition; Faderay
21 October 2008	Prague	Czech Republic	Incheba Aréna	Salamandra; Apparition; Faderay
22 October 2008	Ostrava	Czech Republic	Bonver Arena	Salamandra; Apparition; Faderay
24 October 2008	Bratislava	Slovakia	Sibamac Arena	Salamandra; Apparition; Faderay
25 October 2008	Košice	Slovakia	Cassosport Hall	Salamandra; Apparition; Faderay
27 October 2008	Belgrad	Serbia	Kulture Center	Salamandra; Apparition; Faderay
28 October 2008	Sofia	Bulgaria	Festivalna Hall	Salamandra; Apparition; Faderay
31 October 2008	Tel Aviv	Israel	Hangar 11	Salamandra; Apparition; Faderay
3 November 2008	Kyiv	Ukraine	NAU Culture Center	Salamandra; Apparition; Faderay
4 November 2008	Minsk	Belarus	Sports Palace	Salamandra; Apparition; Faderay
6 November 2008	Moscow	Russia	B1 Maximum Club	Salamandra; Apparition; Faderay
7 November 2008	Samara	Russia	MTL Arena	Salamandra; Apparition; Faderay

List of 2009 concerts, showing date, city, country, venue and support acts
Date	City	Country	Venue	Support act
29 April 2009	New York City	United States	Irving Plaza	The Eternal; Urn
1 May 2009	Montreal	Canada	Le Médley	The Eternal; Urn
2 May 2009	Toronto	Canada	Opera House	The Eternal; Urn
4 May 2009	Chicago	United States	House of Blues	The Eternal; Urn
7 May 2009	San Francisco	United States	Regency Center	The Eternal; Urn
8 May 2009	Los Angeles	United States	House of Blues	The Eternal; Urn
16 May 2009	Mexico City	Mexico	Circo Volador	—N/a
20 May 2009	Caracas	Venezuela	Anfiteatro Sambil	—N/a
23 May 2009	Buenos Aires	Argentina	Teatro Flores	—N/a
24 May 2009	Buenos Aires	Argentina	Teatro Flores	—N/a
26 May 2009	Buenos Aires	Argentina	La Trastienda Club	—N/a
27 May 2009	Buenos Aires	Argentina	La Trastienda Club	—N/a
20 June 2009	Budapest	Hungary	Petofi Csarnok	—N/a
22 June 2009	Bucharest	Romania	Sala Palatului	—N/a
24 June 2009	Žiar nad Hronom	Slovakia	MSK Centrum	—N/a
26 June 2009	Zaragoza	Spain	Metalaway Festival	—N/a
28 June 2009	Monza	Italy	Gods of Metal Festival	—N/a
30 June 2009	Pratteln	Switzerland	Z7 Club	Delain
18 July 2009	Vaasa	Finland	Rockperry Festival	—N/a
21 July 2009	Saarbrücken	Germany	Garage Club	Visions of Atlantis
22 July 2009	Vienna	Austria	Szene Club	Visions of Atlantis
24 July 2009	Malá Skála	Czech Republic	Benátská Noc Festival	—N/a
25 July 2009	Szczytno	Poland	Hunterfest	—N/a
2 August 2009	Kyiv	Ukraine	Global East Festival	—N/a
19 September 2009	Arcen	Netherlands	El Fantasy Fair	—N/a
20 September 2009	Bremen	Germany	Aladin Music Hall	Furnaze; Kings of Modesty
22 September 2009	Hannover	Germany	Capitol Hall	Furnaze; Kings of Modesty
23 September 2009	Berlin	Germany	Columbiahalle	Furnaze; Kings of Modesty
26 September 2009	Barcelona	Spain	Salamandra 1	Furnaze; Kings of Modesty
27 September 2009	Madrid	Spain	La Riviera	Furnaze; Kings of Modesty
29 September 2009	Pratteln	Switzerland	Z7 Club	Furnaze; Kings of Modesty
30 September 2009	Ludwigsburg	Germany	Rockfabrik	Furnaze; Kings of Modesty
2 October 2009	Munich	Germany	Muffat Halle	Furnaze; Kings of Modesty
3 October 2009	Ingolstadt	Germany	Ohrakel Club	Furnaze; Kings of Modesty
5 October 2009	Bologna	Italy	Estragon Club	Furnaze; Kings of Modesty
6 October 2009	Zagreb	Croatia	Tvornica Kulture	Furnaze; Kings of Modesty
8 October 2009	Istanbul	Turkey	Jolly Joker Hall	Furnaze; Kings of Modesty
9 October 2009	Athens	Greece	Gagarin 205 Klub	Furnaze; Kings of Modesty
11 October 2009	Thessaloniki	Greece	Principal Theatre	Furnaze; Kings of Modesty
12 October 2009	Sofia	Bulgaria	Universiada Hall	Furnaze; Kings of Modesty
14 October 2009	Ljubljana	Slovenia	Tivoli Hall	Furnaze; Kings of Modesty
16 October 2009	Pardubice	Czech Republic	ČEZ Arena	Furnaze; Kings of Modesty
18 October 2009	Wieze	Belgium	Metal Female Voices Fest	—N/a
19 October 2009	London	England	O2 Academy Islington	Power Quest

=== Backing Band ===
The following musicians accompanied Tarja on this tour:

- Guitar: Alex Scholpp (2007/Europe 2008 and 2009/North and Latin America 2009) / Kiko Loureiro (Latin America 2008/2009 Summer shows)
- Bass: Doug Wimbish (all shows except for the final European leg in 2009) / Oliver Holzwarth (final European leg in 2009)
- Drums: Mike Terrana (all shows)
- Keyboards: Maria Ilmoniemi (all shows except for the last European leg in 2009) / Christian Kretschmar (last European leg in 2009)
- Cello: Max Lilja (all shows)
- Toni Turunen, Tarja's brother, played additional drums, guitar and did backing and lead vocals, but only in 2007 and in the first European tour in 2008)

== What Lies Beneath World Tour ==
What Lies Beneath World Tour
- Tour by Tarja Turunen
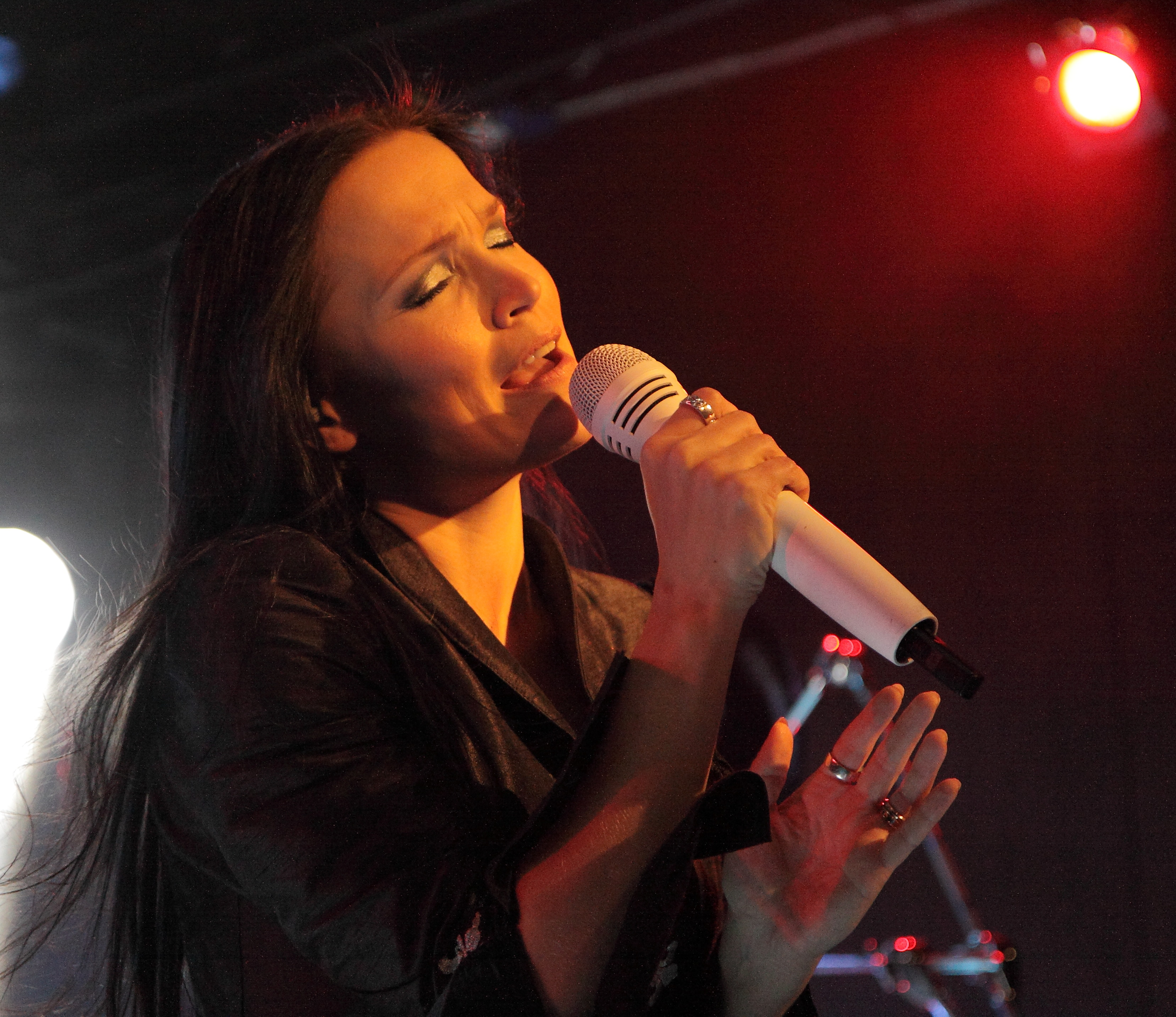
- Tarja in Copenhagen in 2011
- Location: Europe; North America; South America
- Associated album: What Lies Beneath
- Start date: June 13, 2010
- End date: April 8, 2012
- Legs: 8
- No. of shows: 113

Tarja Turunen concert chronology
- Storm World Tour (2007–2009); What Lies Beneath World Tour (2010–2012); Colours on the Road (2013–2015)

=== Songs performed ===
The list of songs is based on the shows played from 2010 to 2011.

From What Lies Beneath

- "Anteroom of Death"
- "Until My Last Breath"
- "I Feel Immortal"
- "In for a Kill"
- "Underneath"
- "Little Lies"
- "Rivers of Lust"
- "Dark Star"
- "Falling Awake"
- "The Archive of Lost Dreams"
- "Crimson Deep"
- "Naiad"
- "We Are"
- "Montañas de Silencio"
- "If You Believe"
- "The Crying Moon"
- "Still of the Night" (Whitesnake cover)

From My Winter Storm

- "I Walk Alone"
- "Lost Norther Star"
- "The Reign"
- "My Little Phoenix"
- "Boy and the Ghost"
- "Sing for Me"
- "Oasis"
- "Damned and Divine"
- "Die Alive"
- "Minor Heaven"
- "Ciarán's Well"
- "Enough"

From Colours in the Dark

- "Into the Sun"
- "Never Enough"

Nightwish songs

- "Lappi"
- "Stargazers"
- "Swanheart"
- "Sleeping Sun"
- "Wishmaster"
- "Bless the Child"
- "End of all Hope"
- "Beauty of the Beast"
- "White Night Fantasy"
- "Nemo"
- "The Siren"
- "Higher than Hope"

Other covers

- "The Phantom of the Opera" (musical theme)
- "Over the Hills and Far Away" (Gary Moore)
- "Tired of Being Alone" (Schiller"
- "Walking in the Air" (Howard Blake)
- "Signos" (Soda Stereo)
- "Where Were You Last Night" (Ankie Bagger)
- "Heaven Is a Place on Earth" (Belinda Carlisle)
- "Livin' on a Prayer" (Bon Jovi)
- "Don't Give Up" (Peter Gabriel)

=== Tour dates ===
List of 2010 concerts, showing date, city, country, venue and support acts
Date	City	Country	Venue	Support act
12 June 2010	Miskolc	Hungary	Miskolc Opera Festival	—N/a
25 June 2010	Dessel	Belgium	Graspop Metal Meeting	—N/a
2 July 2010	Otočec	Slovenia	Rock Otočec Festival	—N/a
8 July 2010	Söderhamn	Sweden	Rockweekend Festival	—N/a
10 July 2010	Haapsalu	Estonia	American Beauty Car Show	—N/a
15 July 2010	Vizovice	Czech Republic	Masters of Rock	—N/a
23 July 2010	Kavarna	Bulgaria	Kaliakra Rock Fest	—N/a
6 August 2010	Wacken	Germany	Wacken Open Air	—N/a
14 August 2010	Snina	Slovakia	Rock Pod Kamenon	—N/a
1 October 2010	Warsaw	Poland	Stodola Club	At the Lake
2 October 2010	Kraków	Poland	Studio Club	At the Lake
4 October 2010	Kyiv	Ukraine	NAU Culture Center	Markize
7 October 2010	Ostrava	Czech Republic	Sareza Arena	Markize
8 October 2010	Prague	Czech Republic	KD Vltavska	Markize
10 October 2010	Paris	France	Bataclan Theatre	Whyzdom
11 October 2010	Tilburg	Netherlands	013 Center	Markize
13 October 2010	London	England	Shepherd's Bush Empire	Solsikk
4 November 2010	Stuttgart	Germany	Porsche-Arena^{[A]}	Eisbrecher
5 November 2010	Kempten	Germany	Big Box^{[A]}	Eisbrecher
6 November 2010	Munich	Germany	Le Zénith^{[A]}	Eisbrecher
8 November 2010	Berlin	Germany	Max-Schmeling-Halle^{[A]}	Eisbrecher
9 November 2010	Leipzig	Germany	Leipzig Arena^{[A]}	Eisbrecher
11 November 2010	Frankfurt	Germany	Jahrhunderthalle^{[A]}	Eisbrecher
12 November 2010	Dortmund	Germany	Westfalenhallen^{[A]}	Eisbrecher
13 November 2010	Braunschweig	Germany	Volkswagen Halle^{[A]}	Eisbrecher
15 November 2010	Bamberg	Germany	Jako Arena^{[A]}	Eisbrecher
16 November 2010	Zurich	Switzerland	Volkshaus	Markize
19 November 2010	Saint-Étienne	France	Le Zénith	Markize
7 December 2010	Hämeenlinna	Finland	Verkatehdas Culture Center	Markize
9 December 2010	Tampere	Finland	Tampere Hall	Markize
12 December 2010	Mikkeli	Finland	Mikaeli Hall	Markize
15 December 2010	Esch-sur-Alzette	Luxembourg	Rockhal	Markize
20 December 2010	Graz	Austria	Orpheum Theatre	Markize
21 December 2010	Milan	Italy	Megazzini Generali	Markize

List of 2011 concerts, showing date, city, country, venue and support acts
Date	City	Country	Venue	Support act
4 March 2011	Mexico City	Mexico	Circo Volador	—N/a
5 March 2011	Guadalajara	Mexico	Teatro Estudio Cavaret	—N/a
8 March 2011	Bogotá	Colombia	Teatro Metropol	Tenebraum
9 March 2011	Medellín	Colombia	Teatro Universitario	Tenebraum
12 March 2011	São Paulo	Brazil	HSBC Brasil	Ecliptyka; Tierramystica
13 March 2011	Rio de Janeiro	Brazil	Fundição Progresso	Ecliptyka; Tierramystica
15 March 2011	Brasília	Brazil	Clube da Rocha	Ecliptyka; Tierramystica
19 March 2011	Lima	Peru	Teatro de la UNI	—N/a
21 March 2011	La Paz	Bolívia	Coliseo Don Bosco	—N/a
23 March 2011	Santiago	Chile	Teatro Teletón	—N/a
26 March 2011	Rosario	Argentina	Teatro El Círculo	Watchmen
27 March 2011	Buenos Aires	Argentina	Estadio Luna Park	Watchmen
29 March 2011	Montevideo	Uruguay	La Trastienda	—N/a
28 April 2011	Saint Petersburg	Russia	Gläv Club	Markize
29 April 2011	Moscow	Russia	Megasport Sport Palace	Markize
1 May 2011	Antwerp	Belgium	Trix HofTerLo	Markize
3 May 2011	Stuttgart	Germany	LKA Longhorn	Markize; Leaves' Eyes
4 May 2011	Erlangen	Germany	E-Werk	Markize; Leaves' Eyes
6 May 2011	Munich	Germany	Backstage Werk	Markize; Leaves' Eyes
7 May 2011	Karlsruhe	Germany	Festhalle	Markize; Leaves' Eyes
8 May 2011	Pratteln	Switzerland	Z7 Club	Markize; Leaves' Eyes
10 May 2011	Bonn	Germany	Brücken Forum	Markize; Leaves' Eyes
11 May 2011	Osnabrück	Germany	Rosenhof Club	Markize; Leaves' Eyes
13 May 2011	Hamburg	Germany	Große Freiheit	Markize; Leaves' Eyes
14 May 2011	Berlin	Germany	Columbiahalle	Markize; Leaves' Eyes
16 May 2011	Leipzig	Germany	Haus Auensee	Markize; Leaves' Eyes
17 May 2011	Neu-Isenburg	Germany	Hugenotten Halle	Markize; Leaves' Eyes
19 May 2011	Bochum	Germany	Matrix Club	Markize; Leaves' Eyes
20 May 2011	Hannover	Germany	Capitol Hall	Markize; Leaves' Eyes
22 May 2011	Copenhagen	Denmark	Lille Vega	—N/a
12 June 2011	Samara	Russia	Rock on the Volga	—N/a
25 June 2011	Debeljača	Serbia	MotoRock Meeting	—N/a
8 July 2011	Harz	Germany	Rock Harz Festival	—N/a
9 July 2011	Amnéville	France	Sonisphere Festival	—N/a
23 July 2011	Saimaa	Finland	Saimaa Open Air	—N/a
12 August 2011	Sibiu	Romania	Artmania Festival	—N/a
20 August 2011	Dinkelsbühl	Germany	Summer Breeze Open Air	—N/a

List of 2012 concerts, showing date, city, country, venue and support acts
Date	City	Country	Venue	Support act
13 January 2012	Zlín	Czech Republic	Euronics Arena	Cry Excess
14 January 2012	Pardubice	Czech Republic	ČEZ Arena	Cry Excess
16 January 2012	Warsaw	Poland	Stodola Club	Cry Excess
17 January 2012	Vilnius	Lithuania	Forum Palace	Cry Excess
19 January 2012	Vienna	Austria	Gasometer	Cry Excess
20 January 2012	Bratislava	Slovakia	Majestic Music Club	Cry Excess
22 January 2012	Ljubljana	Slovenia	Kino Siska Club	Sylpheed
23 January 2012	Zagreb	Croatia	Boogaloo Club	Sylpheed
25 January 2012	Bucharest	Romania	Sala Palatului	Sylpheed
26 January 2012	Sofia	Bulgaria	Armeets Arena	Sylpheed
28 January 2012	Thessaloniki	Greece	Principal Theatre	Hannibal
29 January 2012	Athens	Greece	Fuzz Club	Hannibal
31 January 2012	Tallinn	Estonia	Rock Club	Hannibal
2 February 2012	Kyiv	Ukraine	NAU Culture Center	Hannibal
15 February 2012	Lisbon	Portugal	Aula Magna	Hannibal; Benighted Soul
16 February 2012	Santiago de Compostela	Spain	Sala Capitol	Hannibal; Benighted Soul
18 February 2012	Madrid	Spain	Sala Heineken	Hannibal; Benighted Soul
19 February 2012	Barcelona	Spain	Salamandra 1	Hannibal; Benighted Soul
21 February 2012	Toulouse	France	Le Bikini	Hannibal; Benighted Soul
22 February 2012	Lyon	France	Le Transbordeur	Hannibal; Benighted Soul
24 February 2012	Strasbourg	France	Le Laiterie	Hannibal; Benighted Soul
25 February 2012	Eindhoven	Netherlands	Effenaar Music Hall	Hannibal; Benighted Soul
27 February 2012	Brussels	Belgium	Ancienne Belgique	Hannibal; Benighted Soul
28 February 2012	Paris	France	Bataclan Theatre	Hannibal; Benighted Soul
1 March 2012	Zurich	Switzerland	Live Komplex	Hannibal; Benighted Soul
2 March 2012	Milan	Italy	Teatro de la Luna	Hannibal; Benighted Soul
4 March 2012	Minsk	Belarus	Sports Palace	Hannibal
6 March 2012	Moscow	Russia	Milk Arena	Hannibal
7 March 2012	Nizhny Novgorod	Russia	Opera House	Hannibal
9 March 2012	Yekaterinburg	Russia	Tele-Club	Hannibal
10 March 2012	Saint Petersburg	Russia	Kosmonavt Club	Hannibal
12 March 2012	Krasnodar	Russia	Premiera Arts Palace	Hannibal
13 March 2012	Rostov-on-Don	Russia	Dom Ofitserov SKVO	Hannibal
16 March 2012	Mexico City	Mexico	Teatro de la Ciudad	—N/a
18 March 2012	San José	Costa Rica	Vertigo Club	—N/a
27 March 2012	Cordoba	Argentina	Espacio Quality	Apocrypha
30 March 2012	Rosario	Argentina	Teatro El Círculo	—N/a
31 March 2012	Rosario	Argentina	Teatro El Círculo	—N/a
2 April 2012	Asunción	Paraguay	Teatro del Banco	Mythika
4 April 2012	Porto Alegre	Brazil	Opinião Club	Noctis Notus
5 April 2012	São Paulo	Brazil	Via Funchal	Tierramystica
8 April 2012	Rio de Janeiro	Brazil	Vivo Rio	Tierramystica

- A Supporting Alice Cooper.

=== Backing Band ===
The following musicians accompanied Tarja on this tour:

- Guitar: Alex Scholpp (all shows except for Latin America in 2011) / Julian Barrett (Latin America 2011)
- Bass: Kevin Chown (all shows except for the festivals in 2010 and Latin America in 2011) / Doug Wimbish (Latin America 2011) / Oliver Holzwarth (festivals in 2010)
- Drums: Mike Terrana (all shows)
- Keyboards: Christian Kretschmar (all shows)
- Cello: Max Lilja (all shows)

== Colours on the Road ==
Colours on the Road Tour
- Tour by Tarja Turunen
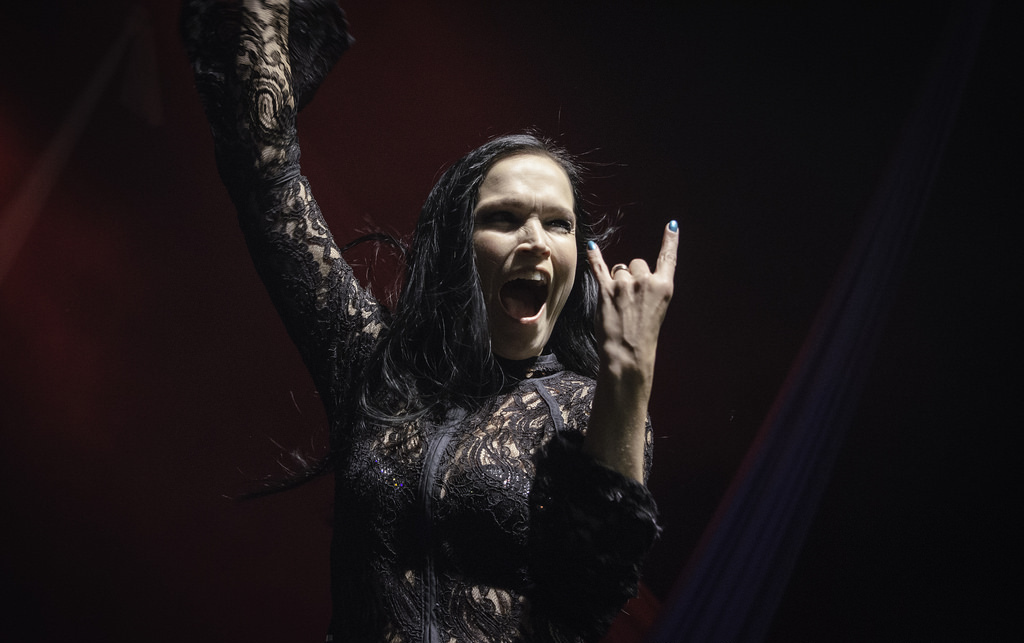
- Tarja in Brazil in 2014
- Location: Europe; North America; South America
- Associated album: Colours in the Dark
- Start date: October 17, 2013
- End date: November 14, 2015
- Legs: 8
- No. of shows: 107

Tarja Turunen concert chronology
- What Lies Beneath World Tour (2010–2012); Colours on the Road Tour (2013–2015); The Shadow Shows (2016–2018)

=== Songs performed ===
The list of songs is based on the shows played from 2013 to 2015.

From Colours in the Dark

- "Victim of Ritual"
- "500 Letters"
- "Lucid Dreamer"
- "Never Enough"
- "Mystique Voyage"
- "Darkness" (Peter Gabriel cover)
- "Deliverance"
- "Neverlight"
- "Until Silence"
- "Medusa"

From My Winter Storm and What Lies Beneath

- "I Walk Alone"
- "Sing for Me"
- "Damned and Divine"
- "Die Alive"
- "Minor Heaven"
- "Ciarán's Well"
- "Calling Grace"
- "Anteroom of Death"
- "Until My Last Breath"
- "In for a Kill"
- "Little Lies"
- "Dark Star"
- "Falling Awake"

From The Brightest Void

- "No Bitter End"

Nightwish songs

- "Slaying the Dreamer"
- "Wish I Had an Angel"

Other covers

- "The Phantom of the Opera" (musical theme)
- "Over the Hills and Far Away" (Gary Moore)
- "Goldfinger" (Movie Soundtrack)
- "Jijiji" (Patrício Rey)
- En la ciudad de la furia / Crimen / De música ligera (Gustavo Cerati)

=== Tour dates ===
List of 2013 concerts, showing date, city, country, venue and support acts
Date	City	Country	Venue	Support act
17 October 2013	Olomouc	Czech Republic	Palackeho Arena	Scala Mercali
19 October 2013	Berlin	Germany	Huxleys Neue Welt	Scala Mercali
20 October 2013	Wieze	Belgium	Metal Female Voices Fest	—N/a
22 October 2013	Hamburg	Germany	The Docks	Scala Mercali
23 October 2013	Dortmund	Germany	FZW Club	Scala Mercali
25 October 2013	Karlsruhe	Germany	Festhalle	Hollow Haze
26 October 2013	Munich	Germany	Backstage Werk	Teodasia
27 October 2013	Vienna	Austria	Arena	Teodasia
29 October 2013	Pratteln	Switzerland	Z7 Club	Teodasia
30 October 2013	Nuremberg	Germany	Loewensaal	Teodasia
1 November 2013	Leipzig	Germany	Haus Auensee	Teodasia
2 November 2013	Cologne	Germany	Gloria-Theater	Teodasia
4 November 2013	Paris	France	Bataclan Theatre	Teodasia

List of 2014 concerts, showing date, city, country, venue and support acts
Date	City	Country	Venue	Support act
28 January 2014	Lisbon	Portugal	Aula Magna	Sorronia; Elyose
29 January 2014	Madrid	Spain	Sala Arena	Sorronia; Elyose
31 January 2014	Bilbao	Spain	Santana 27	Sorronia; Elyose
1 February 2014	Barcelona	Spain	Salamandra 1	Sorronia; Elyose
3 February 2014	Toulouse	France	Le Bikini	Sorronia; Elyose
4 February d2014	Marseille	France	Espace Julien	Sorronia; Elyose
6 February 2014	Lyon	France	Le Transbordeur	Sorronia; Elyose
7 February 2014	Bordeaux	France	Le Krakatoa	Sorronia; Elyose
9 February 2014	Lille	France	Le Splendid	Sorronia; Elyose
10 February 2014	London	England	O2 Academy Islington	Sorronia; Elyose
12 February 2014	Nottingham	England	Rock City	Sorronia; Elyose
13 February 2014	Amsterdam	Netherlands	Melkweg	Sorronia; Elyose
15 February 2014	Vevey	Switzerland	Rocking Chair Club	Sorronia; Elyose
16 February 2014	Udine	Italy	Teatro Nuovo	Sorronia; Elyose
15 March 2014	Krasnodar	Russia	Arena Hall	Ayin Aleph
16 March 2014	Rostov-on-Don	Russia	Dom Oficerov	Ayin Aleph
18 March 2014	Voronej	Russia	Grad City Park	Ayin Aleph
20 March 2014	Saint Petersburg	Russia	A2 Green Club	Ayin Aleph
21 March 2014	Moscow	Russia	Gläv Club	Ayin Aleph
23 March 2014	Nizhny Novgorod	Russia	Milo Club	Ayin Aleph
25 March 2014	Kazan	Russia	Pyramida Hall	Ayin Aleph
26 March 2014	Samara	Russia	Philarmony Hall	Ayin Aleph
28 March 2014	Ufa	Russia	Ogni Ufy	Ayin Aleph
29 March 2014	Yekaterinburg	Russia	Tele-Club	Ayin Aleph
31 March 2014	Omsk	Russia	Concerts Hall	Ayin Aleph
2 April 2014	Krasnoyarsk	Russia	Krasfil Hall	Ayin Aleph
3 April 2014	Novosibirsk	Russia	Club Otdykh	Ayin Aleph
5 April 2014	Khabarovsk	Russia	Club Velicano	Ayin Aleph
6 April 2014	Vladivostok	Russia	Events Hall	Ayin Aleph
2 May 2014	Goteborg	Sweden	Brewhouse	theName
3 May 2014	Hannover	Germany	Theater am Aegi	theName
5 May 2014	Frankfurt	Germany	Batschkapp	theName
6 May 2014	Zurich	Switzerland	Haerterei Club	theName
8 May 2014	Stuttgart	Germany	Theaterhaus	theName
9 May 2014	Erfurt	Germany	Alte Oper	theName
11 May 2014	Mainz	Germany	Kurfürstliches Schloss	theName
12 May 2014	Utrecht	Netherlands	TivoliVredenburg	theName
14 May 2014	Düsseldorf	Germany	Stahwerk Centrum	theName
15 May 2014	Eindhoven	Netherlands	Effenaar Music Hall	theName
17 May 2014	Milan	Italy	Teatro de la Luna	theName
19 May 2014	Rome	Italy	Parco della Musica	theName
29 May 2014	Moscow	Russia	Made in Finland Festival	—N/a
31 May 2014	Saint Petersburg	Russia	Made in Finland Festival	—N/a
8 June 2014	Leipzig	Germany	Wave-Gotik-Treffen	—N/a
31 July 2014	Székesfehérvár	Hungary	Fezen Fesztivál	—N/a
3 August 2014	Wacken	Germany	Wacken Open Air	—N/a
10 August 2014	Colmar	France	Colmar Festival	—N/a
16 August 2014	Dinkelsbühl	Germany	Summer Breeze Open Air	—N/a
6 September 2014	Třinec	Czech Republic	Werk Arena	Free Fall; Hollow Haze
7 September 2014	Pardubice	Czech Republic	ČEZ Arena	Free Fall; Hollow Haze
11 September 2014	Belo Horizonte	Brazil	Music Hall	Mad Old Lady
13 September 2014	São Paulo	Brazil	HSBC Brasil	Mad Old Lady
14 September 2014	Rio de Janeiro	Brazil	Circo Voador	Mad Old Lady
16 September 2014	Rosario	Argentina	Club Brown	Boudika
17 September 2014	Cordoba	Argentina	Plaza de la Música	Navigator
19 September 2014	Buenos Aires	Argentina	Teatro Gran Rex	Abrasantia
20 September 2014	Buenos Aires	Argentina	Teatro Vorterix	Abrasantia
22 September 2014	Cipolletti	Argentina	Meet Dance Club	Instanto Salvaje
23 September 2014	Mendoza	Argentina	Auditorio Bustelo	Intérprete
25 September 2014	Santiago	Chile	Teatro Caupolican	Benetnasch
31 October 2014	Athens	Greece	Gagarin 205 Club	Crimson Blue
1 November 2014	Thessaloniki	Greece	Principal Theatre	Crimson Blue
3 November 2014	Sofia	Bulgaria	Universiada Hall	Crimson Blue
4 November 2014	Bucharest	Romania	Sala Palatului	Crimson Blue
6 November 2014	Belgrad	Serbia	Kulture Center	Crimson Blue
7 November 2014	Bratislava	Slovakia	Refinery Gallery	Crimson Blue
9 November 2014	Kraków	Poland	Klub Studio	Crimson Blue
10 November 2014	Łódź	Poland	Klub Wytwórnia	Crimson Blue
12 November 2014	Katowice	Poland	Mega Club	Crimson Blue
13 November 2014	Warsaw	Poland	Palladium	Crimson Blue
15 November 2014	Minsk	Belarus	Chizhovka-Arena	Crimson Blue
16 November 2014	Vilnius	Lithuania	Forum Palace	Crimson Blue
17 November 2014	Tallinn	Estonia	Rock Club	Crimson Blue
19 November 2014	Turku	Finland	Logomo Center	Crimson Blue
20 November 2014	Hämeenlinna	Finland	Verkatehdas Hall	Crimson Blue

List of 2015 concerts, showing date, city, country, venue and support acts
Date	City	Country	Venue	Support act
3 September 2015	Monterrey	Mexico	Iguana Club	At the Gates
5 September 2015	Mexico City	Mexico	Teatro Metropolitan	At the Gates
7 September 2015	San Salvador	El Salvador	Centro de Convenciones	—N/a
17 October 2015	Recife	Brazil	Clube Português	Monticelli
18 October 2015	Fortaleza	Brazil	Complexo Armazém	Triarchy
21 October 2015	Belo Horizonte	Brazil	Music Hall	Triarchy
23 October 2015	Salvador	Brazil	Barra Hall	—N/a
24 October 2015	São Paulo	Brazil	HSBC Brasil	Mad Old Lady
25 October 2015	Curitiba	Brazil	Vanilla Music Hall	Semblant
28 October 2015	Porto Alegre	Brazil	Teatro do Bourbon Country	DevilSin
30 October 2015	Santiago	Chile	Teatro Cariola	—N/a
3 November 2015	Comodoro Rivadavia	Argentina	Teatro María Auxiliadora	—N/a
5 November 2015	Neuquén	Argentina	Casino Magic	—N/a
7 November 2015	Tucumán	Argentina	Teatro Mercedes Sosa	—N/a
8 November 2015	Salta	Argentina	Teatro Provincial	—N/a
10 November 2015	Mar del Plata	Argentina	Teatro Auditorium	—N/a
11 November 2015	La Plata	Argentina	Sala Ópera	—N/a
13 November 2015	Montevidéu	Uruguay	Music Box	Nameless
14 November 2015	Buenos Aires	Argentina	Microestadio Malvinas	Asspera

=== Backing Band ===
The following musicians accompanied Tarja on this tour:

- Guitar: Alex Scholpp (all shows except for selected 2014 and 2015 shows) / Julian Barrett (selected 2014 and 2015 shows)
- Bass: Kevin Chown (all shows except for 2013 shows and 2015 in Latin America) / Ana Portalupi (2013 shows) / Pit Barrett (Latin America 2015)
- Drums: Mike Terrana (all 2013 shows, and 2014 shows until September) / Thomas Heinz (all shows from September 2014 until the end of 2014) / Nicolas Polo (all 2015 shows)
- Keyboards: Christian Kretschmar (all shows except for Latin America in 2015) / Guilherme de Medio (2015 Latin America shows)
- Cello: Max Lilja (all shows)

== The Shadow Shows ==
The Shadow Shows Tour
- Tour by Tarja Turunen
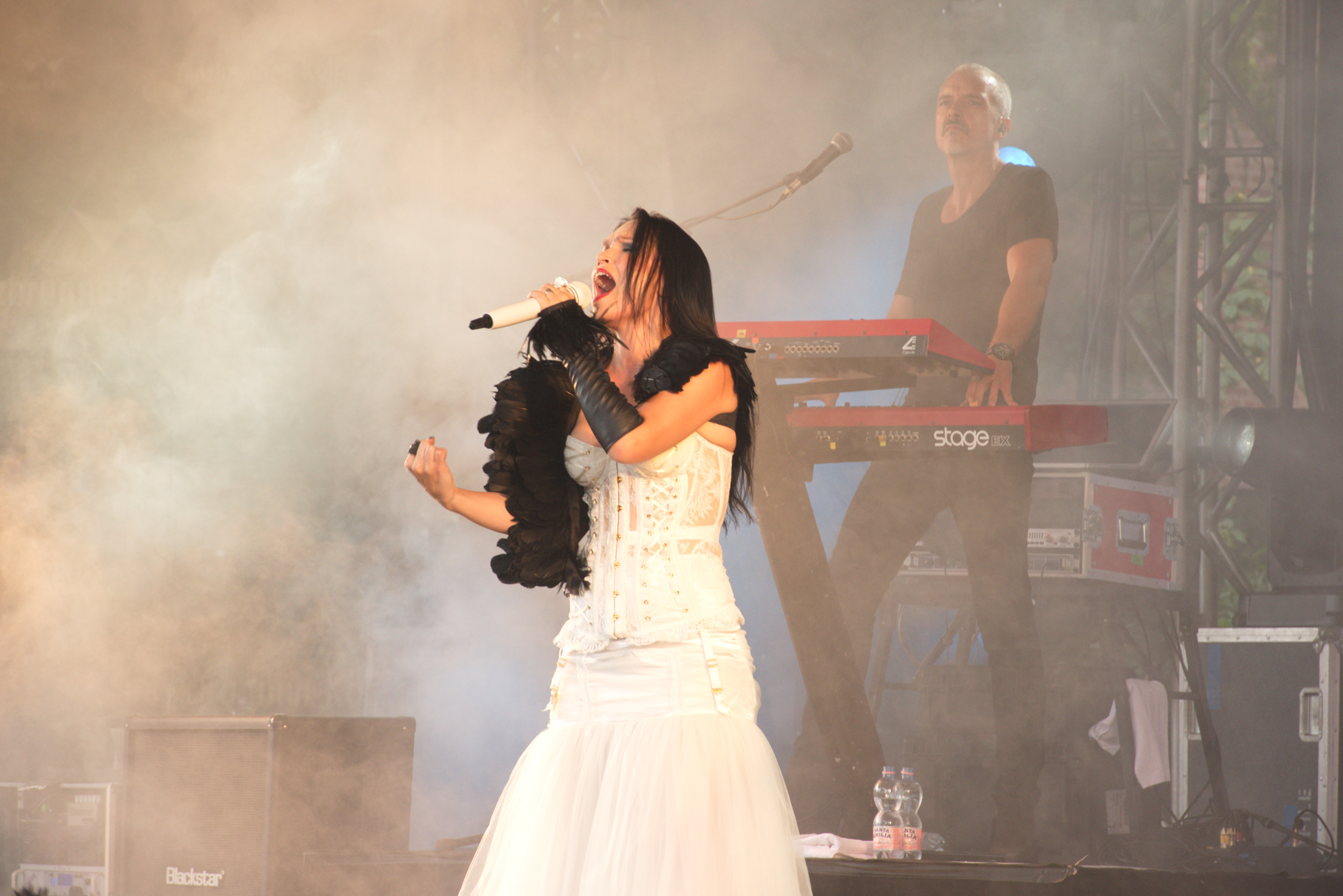
- Tarja at the Amphi Festival in 2016
- Location: Asia; Europe; North America; South America
- Associated album: The Shadow Self; The Brightest Void
- Start date: June 5, 2016
- End date: September 11, 2018
- Legs: 9
- No. of shows: 108

Tarja Turunen concert chronology
- Colours on the Road Tour (2013–2015); The Shadow Shows Tour (2016–2018); A Nordic Symphony Tour (2018)

=== Songs performed ===
The list of songs is based on the shows played from 2016 to 2018.

From The Brightest Void and The Shadow Self

- "No Bitter End"
- "Eagle Eye"
- "Shameless"
- "House of Wax" (Paul McCartney cover)
- "Goldfinger" (Movie soundtrack)
- "Innocence"
- "Demons in You"
- "Love to Hate"
- "Supremacy" (Muse cover)
- "The Living End"
- "Diva"
- "Undertaker"
- "Calling from the Wild"
- "Too Many"

From My Winter Storm, What Lies Beneath and Colours in the Dark

- "I Walk Alone"
- "Sing for Me"
- "The Reign"
- "Die Alive"
- "Ciarán's Well"
- "Anteroom of Death"
- "Until My Last Breath"
- "Little Lies"
- "Dark Star"
- "Falling Awake"
- "Underneath"
- "Victim of Ritual"
- "500 Letters"
- "Lucid Dreamer"
- "Never Enough"
- "Mystique Voyage"
- "Deliverance"
- "Neverlight"
- "Until Silencie"
- "Medusa"

Nightwish songs

- "Tutankhamen"
- "The Riddler"
- "Ever Dream"
- "Slaying the Dreamer"
- "Nemo"

Other covers

- "The Phantom of the Opera" (musical theme)
- "Over the Hills and Far Away" (Gary Moore)
- "Paradise (What About Us?) (Within Temptation)
- "Angels" (Within Temptation)
- "Cielito Lindo" (Quirino Mendoza y Cortés)
- "Lanterna dos Afogados" (Os Paralamas do Sucesso)

=== Tour dates ===
List of 2016 concerts, showing date, city, country, venue and support acts
Date	City	Country	Venue	Support act
5 June 2016	London	England	Rock on Green Festival	—N/a
11 June 2016	Kouvola	Finland	Vaakuna Piknik	—N/a
19 June 2016	Clisson	France	Hellfest	—N/a
22 June 2016	Beijing	China	Tango Star Live	Midori Jewel's Sorrow; Ishtar
23 June 2016	Shanghai	China	MAO Live House	Midori Jewel's Sorrow; Ishtar
25 June 2016	Taipei	Taiwan	ATT Showbox	Midori Jewel's Sorrow; Ishtar
26 June 2016	Hong Kong		Music Zone	Midori Jewel's Sorrow; Ishtar
28 June 2016	Tokyo	Japan	ReNY Club	Midori Jewel's Sorrow; Ishtar
16 October 2016	Kostrzyn nad Odrą	Poland	Woodstock Festival	—N/a
17 October 2016	Vizovice	Czech Republic	Masters of Rock	—N/a
21 July 2016	Nordholz	Germany	Deichbrand Festival	—N/a
23 July 2016	Cologne	Germany	Amphi Festival	—N/a
5 August 2016	Wacken	Germany	Wacken Open Air	—N/a
6 August 2016	Rejmyre	Sweden	Skogsröjet Festival	—N/a
7 August 2016	Saint-Maurice	France	Sylak Open Air	—N/a
13 August 2016	Villena	Spain	Leyendas del Rock Fest	—N/a
18 August 2016	Kotka	Finland	Kotkan Konserttitalo	—N/a
19 August 2016	Kouvola	Finland	Kävelykatu Manski	—N/a
7 October 2016	Hannover	Germany	Capitol Hall	Scarlet Aura; Angra
8 October 2016	Hamburg	Germany	The Docks	Scarlet Aura; Angra
10 October 2016	Berlin	Germany	Huxley's Neue Welt	Scarlet Aura; Angra
11 October 2016	Cologne	Germany	Live Music Hall	Scarlet Aura; Angra
12 October 2016	Frankfurt	Germany	Batschkapp	Scarlet Aura; Angra
14 October 2016	Stuttgart	Germany	Im Wizemann Halle	Scarlet Aura; Angra
15 October 2016	Munich	Germany	Backstage Werk	Scarlet Aura; Angra
18 October 2016	Pratteln	Switzerland	Z7 Club	Scarlet Aura; Visions of Atlantis
19 October 2016	Vienna	Austria	Szene Club	Scarlet Aura; Visions of Atlantis
21 October 2016	Haarlem	Netherlands	Patronaat Center	Republic of Rock and Roll
22 October 2016	Hengelo	Netherlands	Poppodium Mezz	Republic of Rock and Roll
23 October 2016	Wieze	Belgium	Metal Female Voices Fest	—N/a
4 November 2016	Lisbon	Portugal	Aula Magna	SinHeresY; The Shiver
5 November 2016	Madrid	Spain	Joy Eslava Club	SinHeresY; The Shiver
6 November 2016	Barcelona	Spain	Teatro Barts	SinHeresY; The Shiver
8 November 2016	Lyon	France	Le Transbordeur	SinHeresY; The Shiver
9 November 2016	Paris	France	Casino de Paris	SinHeresY; The Shiver
28 November 2016	Florence	Italy	Obihall Theatre	SinHeresY; The Shiver
29 November 2016	Milan	Italy	Teatro de la Luna	SinHeresY; The Shiver
1 December 2016	Prague	Czech Republic	Forum Karlín	Suddenlash; Immension
2 December 2016	Košice	Slovakia	Angels Aréna	Suddenlash; Immension
3 December 2016	Zlín	Czech Republic	Euronics Arena	Suddenlash; Immension
5 December 2016	Warsaw	Poland	Progresja Klub	Suddenlash; Immension
6 December 2016	Wrocław	Poland	Sala Stadion	Suddenlash; Immension
7 December 2016	Bratislava	Slovakia	Majestic Music Club	Suddenlash; Immension

List of 2017 concerts, showing date, city, country, venue and support acts
Date	City	Country	Venue	Support act
1 February 2017	Budapest	Hungary	Barba Negra Club	Devilfire; Anvision
2 February 2017	Timișoara	Romania	Banatul Philharmonic Hall	Devilfire; Anvision
3 February 2017	Bucharest	Romania	Sala Palatului	Devilfire; Anvision
5 February 2017	Athens	Greece	Fuzz Club	Devilfire; Anvision
6 February 2017	Thessaloniki	Greece	Principal Theatre	Devilfire; Anvision
7 February 2017	Sofia	Bulgaria	Universiada Hall	Devilfire; Anvision
9 February 2017	İzmir	Turkey	İzmir Arena	Devilfire; Anvision
10 February 2017	Istanbul	Turkey	Küçükçiftlik Park	Devilfire; Anvision
9 March 2017	Manchester	England	Academy 2	Skinflint; My Own Ghost
10 March 2017	London	England	Camden Palace	Skinflint; My Own Ghost
11 March 2017	Leeuwarden	Netherlands	Neushoorn Club	Skinflint; My Own Ghost
13 March 2017	Helmond	Netherlands	De Cacao Fabriek	Skinflint; My Own Ghost
14 March 2017	Enschede	Netherlands	Atak Club	Skinflint; My Own Ghost
15 March 2017	Esch-sur-Alzette	Luxembourg	Kulturfabrik	Skinflint; My Own Ghost
17 March 2017	Mannheim	Germany	MS Connexion Complex	Skinflint; My Own Ghost
18 March 2017	Solothurn	Switzerland	Kofmehl Centrum	Skinflint; My Own Ghost
12 April 2017	Saint Petersburg	Russia	A2 Green Club	Chaoseum
13 April 2017	Moscow	Russia	Crocus City Hall	Chaoseum
14 April 2017	Nizhny Novgorod	Russia	Premio Center	Chaoseum
16 April 2017	Yekaterinburg	Russia	Tele-Club	Chaoseum
17 April 2017	Chelyabinsk	Russia	World Trade Center	Chaoseum
19 April 2017	Krasnodar	Russia	Arena	Chaoseum
20 April 2017	Voronezh	Russia	Events Hall	Chaoseum
12 May 2017	Jakarta	Indonesia	Hammersonic Festival	Various
18 May 2017	Santiago	Chile	Teatro Caupolicán	Slaverty
20 May 2017	São Paulo	Brazil	Tom Brasil	Armored Down
22 May 2017	Piedade	Brazil	Centro de Eventos	Black Burn
3 June 2017	Plzeň	Czech Republic	Metalfest	—N/a
5 June 2017	Tel Aviv	Israel	Havana Live Music	—N/a
12 June 2017	Norje	Sweden	Sweden Rock Festival	—N/a
16 June 2017	Dessel	Belgium	Graspop Metal Meeting	—N/a
17 June 2017	Sankt Goarshausen	Germany	Rock Fels Festival	—N/a
29 July 2017	Sibiu	Romania	Artmania Festival	—N/a
27 September 2017	San Luis Potosí	Mexico	Cineteca Alameda	Ragdoll Sunday
29 September 2017	Guadalajara	Mexico	C3 Stage	Ragdoll Sunday
2 October 2017	Mérida	Mexico	Hacienda Chenkú	Ragdoll Sunday
4 October 2017	Tegucigalpa	Honduras	Hotel Juan Carlos	Valinor Excelsior
6 October 2017	Guatemala City	Guatemala	Teatro Lux	Valinor Excelsior
21 October 2017	La Paz	Bolivia	Scream Bolivia Fest	—N/a
24 October 2017	Mexico City	Mexico	El Plaza Condesa	Ragdoll Sunday
26 October 2017	Chihuahua	Mexico	House of Blues	Ragdoll Sunday
28 October 2017	Monterrey	Mexico	Northside Rock Meeting	—N/a
29 October 2017	Puebla	Mexico	Puebla Metal Fest	—N/a
18 November 2017	Quito	Ecuador	Teatro Nacional	Sifting
21 November 2017	Mar del Plata	Argentina	Teatro Radio City	Conxuro
22 November 2017	Rosario	Argentina	Teatro El Circulo	Abrasantia
24 November 2017	Córdoba	Argentina	XL Abasto	Abrasantia
25 November 2017	Buenos Aires	Argentina	Estadio Luna Park	Amaranthe
27 November 2017	Montevideo	Uruguay	La Trastienda	Abrasantia

List of 2018 concerts, showing date, city, country, venue and support acts
Date	City	Country	Venue	Support act
9 June 2018	Norje	Sweden	Sweden Rock Festival	—N/a
20 July 2018	Ternopil	Ukraine	Faine Misto Festival	—N/a
28 July 2018	Vaasa	Finland	Vaasa Rock Festival	—N/a
4 August 2018	Kemi	Finland	Satama Open Air	—N/a
6 August 2018	Byblos	Lebanon	Byblos International Festival	—N/a
25 August 2018	Rio de Janeiro	Brazil	Circo Voador	SoulSpell
26 August 2018	Belo Horizonte	Brazil	Theatro Brasil Vallourec	—N/a
28 August 2018	Vila Velha	Brazil	Centro de Eventos	—N/a
30 August 2018	Manaus	Brazil	Teatro Manauara	—N/a
1 September 2018	São Paulo	Brazil	HSBC Hall	Rec/All
2 September 2018	Brasília	Brazil	Toinha Rock Show	Rec/All
4 September 2018	Lima	Peru	CC Festiva	—N/a
6 September 2018	Chicago	United States	Patio Theater	—N/a
8 September 2018	Atlanta	United States	ProgPower USA	—N/a
9 September 2018	New York City	United States	Gramercy Theatre	—N/a
11 September 2018	Los Angeles	United States	El Rey Theatre	—N/a

=== Backing Band ===
The following musicians accompanied Tarja on this tour:

- Guitar: Alex Scholpp (all shows except for selected Chile and Brazil in 2017) / Julian Barrett (Chile and Brazil in 2017)
- Bass: Kevin Chown (all shows)
- Drums: Timm Schreiner (all shows except for June–August 2016) / Ralf Gustke (June–August 2016)
- Keyboards: Christian Kretschmar (all shows)
- Cello: Max Lilja (all shows)

== A Nordic Symphony Tour ==
A Nordic Symphony Tour
- Tour by Tarja Turunen and Stratovarius
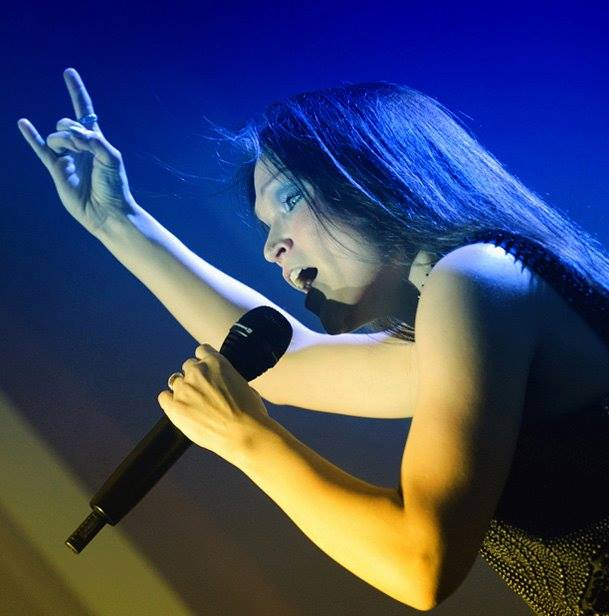
- Tarja in the Netherlands in 2018
- Location: Europe
- Start date: October 1, 2018
- End date: October 29, 2018
- Legs: 1
- No. of shows: 21

Tarja Turunen and Stratovarius concert chronology
- The Shadow Shows Tour (2016–2018); A Nordic Symphony Tour (2018); The Raw Tour (2019–2023)

This was a co-headlining tour between Tarja and the Finnish power metal band Stratovarius, with a support band opening the show, then Stratovarius performing and Tarja closing the night, with the two main acts playing 1-hour sets each.

=== Songs performed ===
The list of songs is based on the shows played in this tour.

From The Brightest Void and The Shadow Self

- "No Bitter End"
- "Eagle Eye"
- "Innocence"
- "Demons in You"
- "Love to Hate"
- "Diva"
- "Undertaker"
- "Calling from the Wild"

From My Winter Storm, What Lies Beneath and Colours in the Dark

- "I Walk Alone"
- "Until My Last Breath"
- "Little Lies"
- "Falling Awake"
- "Victim of Ritual"
- "500 Letters"
- "Deliverance"

=== Tour dates ===
List of 2018 concerts, showing date, city, country, venue and support acts
Date	City	Country	Venue	Support act
1 October 2018	Frankfurt	Germany	Batschkapp	Serpentyne
2 October 2018	Kiel	Germany	Max Club	Serpentyne
3 October 2018	Hannover	Germany	Capitol Hall	Serpentyne
5 October 2018	Karlsruhe	Germany	Substage	Serpentyne
7 October 2018	Utrecht	Netherlands	TivoliVredenburg	Serpentyne
9 October 2018	Bochum	Germany	Matrix Club	Serpentyne
10 October 2018	Cologne	Germany	Essigfabrik	Serpentyne
11 October 2018	Saarbrücken	Germany	Garage Club	Serpentyne
13 October 2018	Solothurn	Switzerland	Kulturfabrik Kofmehl	Serpentyne
14 October 2018	Grenoble	France	L'Ilyade Halle	Serpentyne
16 October 2018	Rome	Italy	Orion Club	Serpentyne
17 October 2018	Milan	Italy	Alcatraz Club	Serpentyne
18 October 2018	Munich	Germany	Backstage Werk	Serpentyne
20 October 2018	Innsbruck	Austria	Music Hall	Serpentyne
21 October 2018	Prague	Czech Republic	Karlín Forum	Serpentyne
22 October 2018	Berlin	Germany	Festsaal Kreuzberg	Serpentyne
24 October 2018	Gdańsk	Poland	B90 Club	Serpentyne
25 October 2018	Kraków	Poland	Klub Studio	Serpentyne
26 October 2018	Dresden	Germany	Reithalle	Serpentyne
28 October 2018	Budapest	Hungary	Barba Negra Club	Serpentyne
29 October 2018	Sofia	Bulgaria	Universiada Hall	Serpentyne

=== Backing Band ===
The following musicians accompanied Tarja on this tour, playing in all the shows:

- Guitar: Alex Scholpp
- Bass: Kevin Chown
- Drums: Timm Schreiner
- Keyboards: Christian Kretschmar
- Cello: Max Lilja

== The Raw Tour ==
The Raw Tour
- Tour by Tarja Turunen
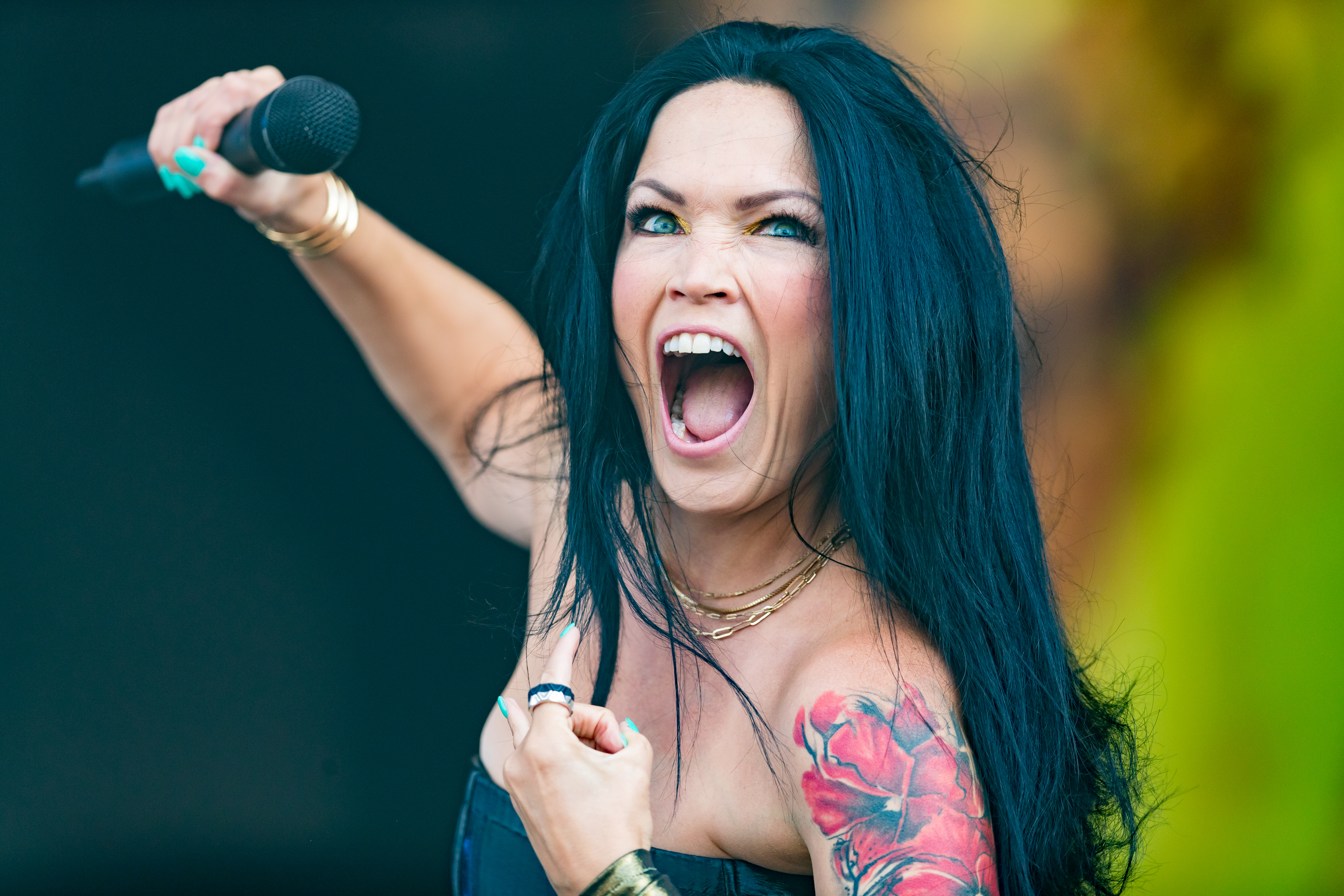
- Tarja at the Wacken Open Air in 2022
- Location: Europe; North America; South America
- Associated album: In the Raw
- Start date: May 3, 2019
- End date: May 14, 2023
- Legs: 12
- No. of shows: 96

Tarja Turunen concert chronology
- A Nordic Symphony Tour (2018); The Raw Tour (2019–2023); Living the Dream Tour (2023–2025)

The tour was interrupted in March 2020 due to the COVID-19 pandemic, with Tarja returning to the stage for a few shows in 2021, finally resuming the tour in 2022.

=== Songs performed ===
The list of songs is based on the shows played from 2019 to 2023.

From In the Raw

- "Dead Promises"
- "Goodbye Strangers"
- "Tears in Rain"
- "You and I"
- "The Golden Chamber (Awaken – Loputon yö – Alchemy)"
- "Spirits of the Sea"
- "Silent Masquerade"
- "Serene"
- "Shadow Play"

From My Winter Storm, What Lies Beneath and Colours in the Dark and The Shadow Self

- "I Walk Alone"
- "My Little Phoenix"
- "Oasis"
- "Die Alive"
- "Anteroom of Death"
- "Until My Last Breath"
- "Falling Awake"
- "Naiad"
- "Victim of Ritual"
- "500 Letters"
- "Never Enough"
- "Mystique Voyage"
- "Innocence"
- "Demons in You"
- "Diva"
- "Undertaker"

Nightwish songs

- "Sleeping Sun"
- "Wishmaster"
- "Nemo"
- "Planet Hell"

Other covers

- "The Phantom of the Opera" (musical theme)
- "Over the Hills and Far Away" (Gary Moore)

=== Tour dates ===
List of 2019 concerts, showing date, city, country, venue and support acts
Date	City	Country	Venue	Support act
3 May 2019	Wrocław	Poland	Centennial Hall	Serpentyne
5 May 2019	Sfântu Gheorghe	Romania	Piaţa Libertăţii	—N/a
7 May 2019	Dnipro	Ukraine	Shynnyk Palace of Culture	Serpentyne
8 May 2019	Kyiv	Ukraine	NAU Culture Center	Serpentyne
9 May 2019	Odesa	Ukraine	Philharmonic Theater	Serpentyne
11 May 2019	Kharkiv	Ukraine	NLU Palace of Students	Serpentyne
12 May 2019	Lviv	Ukraine	Malevich Concert Arena	Serpentyne
14 May 2019	Minsk	Belarus	Prime Hall	Serpentyne
17 May 2019	Kaunas	Lithuania	Kaunas Castle	—N/a
14 June 2019	Fuengirola	Spain	Rock the Coast Fest	—N/a
20 June 2019	Bogotá	Colombia	Rock al Parque	—N/a
5 July 2019	Chania	Greece	Chania Rock Festival	—N/a
7 July 2019	Novi Sad	Serbia	Exit Festival	—N/a
13 July 2019	Vizovice	Czech Republic	Masters of Rock	—N/a
19 July 2019	Pratteln	Switzerland	Z7 Summer Nights	—N/a
26 July 2019	Tolmin	Slovenia	MetalDays	—N/a
7 September 2019	Trnava	Slovakia	Areál Slávie Arena	Veridia
12 September 2019	Saint Petersburg	Russia	A2 Green Center	Saltimbankya; Chaoseum
13 September 2019	Moscow	Russia	Gläv Club	Saltimbankya; Chaoseum
14 September 2019	Voronezh	Russia	Aura Hall	Saltimbankya; Chaoseum
16 September 2019	Rostov-on-Don	Russia	Sports Arena	Saltimbankya; Chaoseum
17 September 2019	Krasnodar	Russia	Arena	Saltimbankya; Chaoseum
20 September 2019	Kazan	Russia	Heremitage Hall	Saltimbankya; Chaoseum
23 September 2019	Ufa	Russia	Ogni Club	Saltimbankya; Chaoseum
25 September 2019	Yekaterinburg	Russia	Tele-Club	Saltimbankya; Chaoseum
17 October 2019	Montevideo	Uruguay	La Trastienda	Cashate
19 October 2019	Buenos Aires	Argentina	Teatro Flores	Abrasantia
22 October 2019	Santiago de Querétaro	Mexico	Teatro Metropolitano	Asspera
23 October 2019	Monterrey	Mexico	Escena Ballroom	Asspera
25 October 2019	Mexico City	Mexico	Circo Volador	Asspera
26 October 2019	Leon	Mexico	Foro del Lago	Asspera
27 October 2019	Guadalajara	Mexico	C3 Stage	Asspera

List of 2020 and 2021 concerts, showing date, city, country, venue and support acts
Date	City	Country	Venue	Support act
21 January 2020	Prague	Czech Republic	State Opera	—N/a
23 January 2020	Bucharest	Romania	Circul Metropolitan	—N/a
7 March 2020	Lisbon	Portugal	Sala Tejo	Serpentyne; Beneath the Remains
8 March 2020	Murcia	Spain	Sala Gamma	Serpentyne; Beneath the Remains
9 March 2020	Madrid	Spain	Sala But	Serpentyne; Beneath the Remains
11 March 2020	Bilbao	Spain	Santana 27	Serpentyne; Beneath the Remains
30 July 2021	Kokkola	Finland	Kokkolan Viinijuhlat	—N/a
13 August 2021	Kortrijk	Belgium	Alcatraz Festival	—N/a
29 August 2021	Fuengirola	Spain	Metal Paradise Fest	—N/a
4 September 2021	Zamora	Spain	Z! Live Festival	—N/a

List of 2022 concerts, showing date, city, country, venue and support acts
Date	City	Country	Venue	Support act
15 April 2022	Limeira	Brazil	Miragem Eventos	Santo Graal
16 April 2022	São Paulo	Brazil	Tokyo Marine Hall	Shaman
17 April 2022	Rio de Janeiro	Brazil	Sacadura 154	Allen Key
19 April 2022	Santiago	Chile	Teatro Cariola	Slaverty
21 April 2022	Rosario	Argentina	Teatro El Círculo	Pulso Critico
22 April 2022	Buenos Aires	Argentina	Teatro Broadway	Pulso Critico
4 June 2022	Fruška Gora	Serbia	Vila Festival	—N/a
6 July 2022	Ballenstedt	Germany	Rock Harz Festival	—N/a
8 July 2022	Fiesole	Italy	Fiesole Live Night	—N/a
6 August 2022	Wacken	Germany	Wacken Open Air	—N/a
13 August 2022	Michalovce	Slovakia	Rock Pod Kamenon	—N/a
19 August 2022	Saint-Nolff	France	Motocultor Festival	—N/a
17 October 2022	Sofia	Bulgaria	Joy Station Halle	Serpentyne; Abakas
18 October 2022	Bucharest	Romania	Roman Arena	Serpentyne; Abakas
19 October 2022	Cluj-Napoca	Romania	FORM Space	Serpentyne; Abakas
21 October 2022	Budapest	Hungary	Barba Negra Club	Serpentyne; Abakas
22 October 2022	Ziar nad Hronom	Slovakia	MSK Centrum	Serpentyne; Abakas
23 October 2022	Bratislava	Slovakia	Majestic Music Club	Serpentyne; Abakas
25 October 2022	Kraków	Poland	Klub Studio	Serpentyne; Abakas
26 October 2022	Wrocław	Poland	A2 Centrum Koncertowe	Serpentyne; Abakas
28 October 2022	Brno	Czech Republic	Sono Centrum	Serpentyne; Abakas
29 October 2022	Pardubice	Czech Republic	Ideon Centrum	Serpentyne; Abakas

List of 2023 concerts, showing date, city, country, venue and support acts
Date	City	Country	Venue	Support act
1 February 2023	Glasgow	Scotland	Garage Club	Temperance; Beneath the Remains
2 February 2023	Wolverhampton	England	KK's Steel Mill	Temperance; Beneath the Remains
4 February 2023	Manchester	England	Manchester Academy	Temperance; Beneath the Remains
5 February 2023	London	England	Electric Ballroom	Temperance; Beneath the Remains
6 February 2023	Paris	France	La Cigale	Temperance; Beneath the Remains
8 February 2023	Strasbourg	France	La Laiterie	Temperance; Serpentyne
9 February 2023	Lyon	France	Le Transbordeur	Temperance; Serpentyne
10 February 2023	Trezzo sull'Adda	Italy	Live Club	Temperance; Serpentyne
12 February 2023	Marseille	France	Espace Julien	Temperance; Serpentyne
13 February 2023	Barcelona	Spain	Sala Apollo	Temperance; Serpentyne
14 February 2023	Madrid	Spain	Mon Live Club	Temperance; Serpentyne
1 March 2023	Lyss	Switzerland	Kulturfabrik	Temperance; Serpentyne
3 March 2023	Ljubljana	Slovenia	Kino Šiška Club	Temperance; Serpentyne
4 March 2023	Vienna	Austria	Szene Club	Temperance; Serpentyne
5 March 2023	Munich	Germany	Backstage Werk	Temperance; Serpentyne
7 March 2023	Nuremberg	Germany	Hirsch Club	Temperance; Serpentyne
8 March 2023	Leipzig	Germany	Hellraiser Club	Temperance; Serpentyne
9 March 2023	Berlin	Germany	Columbia Theater	Temperance; Serpentyne
11 March 2023	Mannheim	Germany	MS Connexion Centre	Temperance; Serpentyne
12 March 2023	Herford	Germany	X Club	Temperance; Serpentyne
13 March 2023	Hamburg	Germany	Markthalle	Temperance; Serpentyne
15 March 2023	Bochum	Germany	Matrix Club	Temperance; Serpentyne
16 March 2023	Nijmegen	Netherlands	Doornroosje House	Temperance; Serpentyne
17 March 2023	Haarlem	Netherlands	Patronaat Stage 1	Temperance; Serpentyne
2 May 2023	Helsinki	Finland	Kulttuuritalo	Pentti Hietanen
3 May 2023	Lahti	Finland	Sibelius Hall	Pentti Hietanen
6 May 2023	Kouvola	Finland	Kuusankoskitalo	Pentti Hietanen
7 May 2023	Hämeenlinna	Finland	Verkatehdas Hall	Pentti Hietanen
9 May 2023	Tampere	Finland	Tampere Hall	Pentti Hietanen
11 May 2023	Turku	Finland	Logomo Cultural Center	Pentti Hietanen
12 May 2023	Porvoo	Finland	Taidetehdas	Pentti Hietanen
13 May 2023	Kuopio	Finland	Musiikkikeskus	Pentti Hietanen
14 May 2023	Lappeenranta	Finland	Lappeenranta-Sali	Pentti Hietanen

=== Backing Band ===
The following musicians accompanied Tarja on this tour:

- Lead Guitar: Alex Scholpp (all shows except for Latin America in 2019) / Julian Barrett (Latin America 2019)
- Bass: Kevin Chown (First European leg and festival in 2019) / Doug Wimbish (Latin America 2019/festivals in 2021 and 2022/October 2022/all shows in 2023) / Pit Barrett (Latin America 2022)
- Drums: Timm Schreinet (all shows from 2019 to 2023) / Alex Holzwarth (all shows in 2023)
- Keyboards: Christian Kretschmar (all shows except for Latin America in 2022) / Guillermo del Medio (Latin America 2022)
- Cello: Max Lilja (all shows)

== Living the Dream Tour ==
Living the Dream Tour
- Tour by Tarja Turunen
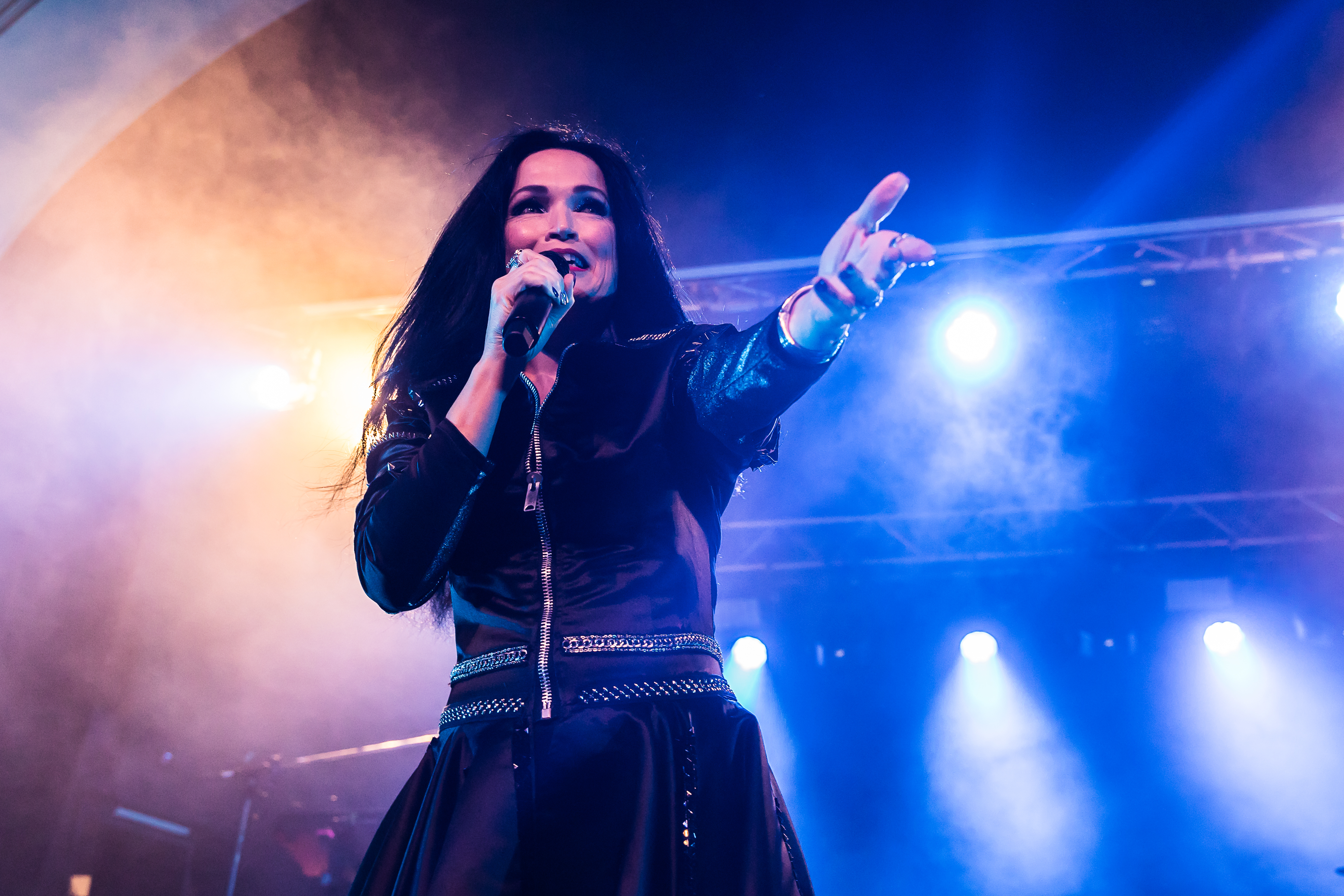
- Tarja in Germany in 2024
- Location: Asia; Europe; North America; South America
- Associated album: Best of: Living the Dream
- Start date: 14 June 2023
- End date: 16 February 2026
- Legs: 10
- No. of shows: 130

Tarja Turunen concert chronology
- The Raw Tour (2019–2023); Living the Dream Tour (2023–2026); Frisson Live (2026)

The shows in 2023 were dubbed the "Greatest Hits Tour", which started in the United States. In 2024, Tarja was joined on tour by Marko Hietala, her former bandmate in Nightwish, with the shows being dubbed the "Together Tour", with Marko playing sets before Tarja then joining her during her sets for many duets, with shows already scheduled until early 2026. The "Living the Dream Tour" is the longest solo tour that Tarja has done to date at 130 shows, running from 2023 to 2026, tying with the Once Upon a Tour with Nightwish in 2004 and 2005.

=== Songs performed ===
The list of songs is based on the shows played from 2023 to 2025 throughout the tour.

From Living the Dream, My Winter Storm and What Lies Beneath

- "Eye of the Storm"
- "I Walk Alone"
- "Oasis"
- "Die Alive"
- "Sing for Me"
- "Enough"
- "Anteroom of Death"
- "Until My Last Breath"
- "I Feel Immortal"
- "Dark Star"
- "In for a Kill"
- "Falling Awake"
- "Naiad"
- "The Crying Moon"

From Colours in the Dark, The Shadow Self and In the Raw

- "Victim of Ritual"
- "Deliverance"
- "Innocence"
- "Demons in You"
- "Diva"
- "Love to Hate"
- "Eagle Eye"
- "Undertaker"
- "Dead Promises"
- "Tears in Rain"
- "You and I"
- "Shadow Play"
- "Silent Masquerade"

Nightwish songs

- "Wishmaster"
- "Dead to the World"
- "Ever Dream"
- "Feel for You"
- "Slaying the Dreamer"
- "Wish I Had an Angel"
- "Nemo"
- "Planet Hell"
- "Higher than Hope"

Other covers

- "The Phantom of the Opera" (musical theme)
- "Over the Hills and Far Away" (Gary Moore)
- "Left on Mars" (Marko Hietala)
- "Muchacha (ojos de papel)" (Luis Alberto Spinetta)
- "Ovelha Negra" (Rita Lee)
- "Cielito Lindo" (Quirino Mendoza)

=== Tour dates ===
List of 2023 concerts, showing date, city, country, venue and support acts
Date	City	Country	Venue	Support act
14 June 2023	Philadelphia	United States	Theatre of the Living Arts	Chaoseum
16 June 2023	Baltimore	United States	Soundstage	Chaoseum
17 June 2023	New York City	United States	Gramercy Theatre	Chaoseum
18 June 2023	Boston	United States	Big Night Live	Chaoseum
20 June 2023	Detroit	United States	Saint Andrew's Hall	Chaoseum
21 June 2023	Chicago	United States	House of Blues	Chaoseum
22 June 2023	Minneapolis	United States	Varsity Theater	Chaoseum
24 June 2023	Denver	United States	Marquis Theater	Chaoseum
26 June 2023	Phoenix	United States	Crescent Ballroom	Chaoseum
27 June 2023	Los Angeles	United States	Belasco Theatre	Chaoseum
28 June 2023	Las Vegas	United States	House of Blues	Chaoseum
30 June 2023	Berkeley	United States	UC Theatre	Chaoseum
8 July 2023	Pratteln	Switzerland	Z7 Summer Nights	—N/a
14 July 2023	Vizovice	Czech Republic	Masters of Rock	—N/a
3 August 2023	Savonlinna	Finland	Olavinlinna Castle	—N/a
13 August 2023	Rajevo Selo	Croatia	Pannonian Rock Festival	—N/a
27 August 2023	Bistrița	Romania	CODRU Festival	—N/a
1 September 2023	Graz	Austria	Metal on the Hills	—N/a
15 September 2023	Córdoba	Argentina	Studio Theater	Inazulina
16 September 2023	Buenos Aires	Argentina	Teatro Flores	Inazulina
18 September 2023	Montevideo	Uruguay	Teatro Nova Era	Inazulina
20 September 2023	Santiago	Chile	Blondie Club	Sinner's Blood
22 September 2023	Porto Alegre	Brazil	Clube Opinião	Santo Graal
23 September 2023	São Paulo	Brazil	Tokyo Marine Hall	Santo Graal
24 September 2023	Limeira	Brazil	Mirage Eventos	Santo Graal
26 September 2023	Lima	Peru	CC Festiva	Hamadría
28 September 2023	Bogotá	Colombia	Teatro Jorge Eliécer	Titanika

List of 2024 concerts, showing date, city, country, venue and support acts
Date	City	Country	Venue	Support act
28 February 2024	Neuquén	Argentina	Casino Magic	Inazulina
1 March 2024	Mar del Plata	Argentina	Abbey Road Club	Ana Magiar
3 March 2024	Buenos Aires	Argentina	Teatro Vorterix	Azeroth
5 March 2024	Santiago	Chile	Teatro Coliseo	Slaverty
6 March 2024	Concepción	Chile	Espacio Marina	Slaverty
8 March 2024	São Paulo	Brazil	Tokyo Marine Hall	Allen Key
9 March 2024	Porto Alegre	Brazil	Clube Opinião	Andreas Solrák
13 March 2024	Brasília	Brazil	Toinha Rock Show	Allen Key
14 March 2024	Rio de Janeiro	Brazil	Sacadura 154	Lumnia
16 March 2024	Fortaleza	Brazil	Complexo Armazém	—N/a
17 March 2024	Belém	Brazil	Espaço Náutico	Studio Pub Fest
19 March 2024	Recife	Brazil	Armazém 14	—N/a
17 May 2024	Chihuahua	Mexico	Palco Pistoleros	Ragdoll Sunday
18 May 2024	Guadalajara	Mexico	C3 Stage	Ragdoll Sunday
19 May 2024	Mexico City	Mexico	Circo Volador	Ragdoll Sunday
21 May 2024	Querétaro	Mexico	Centro de Congresos	Ragdoll Sunday
22 May 2024	Morelia	Mexico	Teatro Morelos	Ragdoll Sunday
24 May 2024	San Luis Potosí	Mexico	Clube Libanés	Ragdoll Sunday
25 May 2024	Torreón	Mexico	Teatro Nazas	Ragdoll Sunday
26 May 2024	Monterrey	Mexico	Clube Iguana	Ragdoll Sunday
28 May 2024	San José	Costa Rica	Peppers Klubi	Madzilla
29 May 2024	San Salvador	El Salvador	Ginásio Adolfo Pineda	Madzilla
1 June 2024	Plzeň	Czech Republic	Metalfest	—N/a
13 June 2024	Yerevan	Armenia	Platform Live House	Aetheria
15 June 2024	Limassol	Cyprus	Opus Hall	Aetheria
17 June 2024	Tbilisi	Georgia	Mono Hall	Aetheria
19 June 2024	Almaty	Kazakhstan	Palace of the Republic	Aetheria
21 June 2024	Dessel	Belgium	Graspop Metal Meeting	—N/a
22 June 2024	Grenchen	Switzerland	Summerside Festival	—N/a
20 July 2024	Uusikaupunki	Finland	Karjurock Festival	—N/a
9 August 2024	Alicante	Spain	Leyendas del Rock Fest	—N/a
6 September 2024	Fuengirola	Spain	Sohail Castle	Chaoseum
8 September 2024	Berlin	Germany	Huxley's Neue Welt	Chaoseum
9 September 2024	Bremen	Germany	Aladin Music Hall	Chaoseum
10 September 2024	Saarbrücken	Germany	Garage Club	Chaoseum
12 September 2024	Leipzig	Germany	Anker House	Chaoseum
13 September 2024	Hamburg	Germany	Gruenspan Club	Chaoseum
14 September 2024	Herford	Germany	Kultur Werk	Chaoseum
16 September 2024	Groningen	Netherlands	De Oosterpoort	Chaoseum
17 September 2024	Utrecht	Netherlands	TivoliVredenburg	Chaoseum
18 September 2024	Bochum	Germany	Matrix Club	Chaoseum
20 September 2024	Ulm	Germany	Roxy Club	Chaoseum
21 September 2024	Obertraubling	Germany	Events Hall	Chaoseum
23 September 2024	Frankfurt	Germany	Batschkapp	Chaoseum
24 September 2024	Munich	Germany	Backstage Werk	Chaoseum
25 September 2024	Pratteln	Switzerland	Z7 Club	Chaoseum

List of 2025 concerts, showing date, city, country, venue and support acts
Date	City	Country	Venue	Support act
23 February 2025	Tallinn	Estonia	Helitejas Music Hall	Serpentyne
25 February 2025	Riga	Latvia	Palladium	Serpentyne
26 February 2025	Vilnius	Lithuania	Menu Fabrikas Loftas	Serpentyne
27 February 2025	Gdańsk	Poland	B90 Club	Serpentyne
1 March 2025	Warsaw	Poland	Progresja Club	Serpentyne
2 March 2025	Kraków	Poland	Klub Kwadrat	Symphonity
3 March 2025	Wrocław	Poland	A2 Center	Symphonity
5 March 2025	Košice	Slovakia	Colisseum Club	Symphonity; Aaetheria
6 March 2025	Banská Bystrica	Slovakia	Dukla Sports Hall	Symphonity; Aaetheria
7 March 2025	Zlín	Czech Republic	Datart Arena	Symphonity; Aaetheria
9 March 2025	Bratislava	Slovakia	Majestic Music Club	Symphonity; Aaetheria
10 March 2025	Ljubljana	Slovenia	Kino Šiška Club	Aaetheria
11 March 2025	Zagreb	Croatia	Tvornika Kulture	Aaetheria
13 March 2025	Budapest	Hungary	Barba Negra Club	Aaetheria
28 March 2025	Belgrad	Serbia	MTS Dvorana	Symphonity
29 March 2025	Belgrad	Serbia	MTS Dvorana	Symphonity
31 March 2025	Cluj-Napoca	Romania	FORM Space	Symphonity
1 April 2025	Bucharest	Romania	Sala Palatului	Symphonity
2 April 2025	Varna	Bulgaria	Palace of Culture and Sports	Symphonity
4 April 2025	Sofia	Bulgaria	Asics Arena	Symphonity
5 April 2025	Skopje	Macedonia	Phillarmonic Hall	Symphonity
6 April 2025	Thessaloniki	Greece	Principal Theater	Symphonity
8 April 2025	Athens	Greece	Fuzz Club	Symphonity
10 April 2025	Istanbul	Turkey	Jolly Jocker Arena	Symphonity
16 May 2025	Buenos Aires	Argentina	Teatro Flores	Madzilla
18 May 2025	Curitiba	Brazil	Ópera de Arame	Madzilla
20 May 2025	Belo Horizonte	Brazil	Mister Rock Club	Madzilla
22 May 2025	Porto Alegre	Brazil	Auditório Araújo Vianna	Madzilla
24 May 2025	São Paulo	Brazil	Tokyo Marine Hall	Madzilla
26 May 2025	Santiago	Chile	Teatro Coliseo	Madzilla
28 May 2025	Guadalajara	Mexico	Diana Theatre	Madzilla
30 May 2025	Querétaro	Mexico	Teatro Metropolitano	Madzilla
31 May 2025	Mexico City	Mexico	Auditório Blackberry	Madzilla
1 June 2025	Morelia	Mexico	Teatro Morelos	Madzilla
3 June 2025	San José	Costa Rica	Palacio de los Deportes	Madzilla
25 June 2025	Galicia	Spain	Resurrection Fest	—N/a
27 June 2025	Helsinki	Finland	Tuska Open Air	—N/a
28 June 2025	Oslo	Norway	Tons of Rock Festival	—N/a
13 July 2025	Tuttlingen	Germany	Honber Sommer Fest	—N/a
23 July 2025	Bratislava	Slovakia	Refinery Gallery	The Skys
25 July 2025	Jena	Germany	F-Haus	The Skys
26 July 2025	Thalmässing	Germany	Classic Rock Night	—N/a
27 July 2025	Aschaffenburg	Germany	Colos-Saal	The Skys
29 July 2025	Tilburg	Netherlands	013 Live	The Skys
30 July 2025	Wacken	Germany	Wacken Open Air	—N/a
31 July 2025	Cologne	Germany	Essigfabrik	The Skys
16 August 2025	Dinkelsbühl	Germany	Summer Breeze Open Air	—N/a
22 August 2025	Aarburg	Switzerland	Riverside Festival	—N/a
24 August 2025	Altidona	Italy	WonderGate Festival	—N/a
30 August 2025	Brüggen	Germany	Brüggen Open Air	—N/a

List of 2026 concerts, showing date, city, country, venue and support acts
Date	City	Country	Venue	Support act
29 January 2026	Lisbon	Portugal	Coliseu dos Recreios	—N/a
30 January 2026	Gijón	Spain	Gijón Arena	—N/a
31 January 2026	Bilbao	Spain	Santana 27	—N/a
2 February 2026	Madrid	Spain	La Riviera	—N/a
3 February 2026	Barcelona	Spain	Razzmatazz 1	—N/a
5 February 2026	Trezzo sull'Adda	Italy	Live Club	—N/a
7 February 2026	Innsbruck	Austria	Live Music Hall	The Skys
8 February 2026	Zlín	Czech Republic	Datart Arena	Symphonity
9 February 2026	Würzburg	Germany	Posthalle	Rock and Roll Addiction; The Skys
11 February 2026	Wetzlar	Germany	Event Werkslatt	Rock and Roll Addiction; The Skys
12 February 2026	Memmingen	Germany	Kamin Werk	Rock and Roll Addiction; The Skys
13 February 2026	Stuttgart	Germany	LKA Longhorn	Rock and Roll Addiction; The Skys
15 February 2026	Paris	France	Alhambra Theatre	The Skys
16 February 2026	London	England	Shepherd's Bush Empire	The Skys

=== Backing Band ===
The following musicians accompanied Tarja on this tour, playing in all dates so far:

- Lead Guitar: Alex Scholpp (all shows)
- Rhythm guitar: Julian Barrett (all shows)
- Bass: Pit Barrett (all shows)
- Drums: Alex Menichini (2023–2025) / Fernando Scarcella (2025)
- Keyboards: Guillermo del Medio (all shows)

== Frisson Live ==
Frisson Live
- Tour by Tarja Turunen
- Location: Europe; Latin America
- Associated album: Frisson Noir
- Start date: 30 September 2026
- End date: 5 June 2027
- No. of shows: 49

Tarja Turunen concert chronology
- Living the Dream Tour (2023–2026); Frisson Live (2026–2027)

On 16 February 2026, the same day she concluded the Living the Dream Tour, Tarja announced on her social media a new series of concerts for later in the year. The tour, titled Frisson Live, is linked to Tarja's tenth studio album, Frisson Noir, with more dates expected to be announced soon.

=== Songs performed ===
The list of songs is based on the shows played throughout the tour.

From Frisson Noir

- "Frisson Noir"
- "At Sea"
- "I Don't Care"
- "The Trace Outlives"
- "Against The Odds"

From Colours in the Dark, The Shadow Self and In the Raw

- "Neverlight"
- "Calling from the Wild"
- "Love to Hate"
- "The Living End"
- "Dead Promises"
- "Serene"
- "Tears in Rain"

From My Winter Storm and What Lies Beneath

- "I Walk Alone"
- "Lost Northern Star"
- "Ciarán's Well"
- "Boy and the Ghost"
- "Calling Grace"
- "Until My Last Breath"
- "Underneath"
- "Little Lies"
- "Montañas de Silencio"

=== Tour dates ===
List of 2026 concerts, showing date, city, country, venue and support acts
Date	City	Country	Venue	Support act
30 September 2026	Berlin	Germany	Neue Welt	Symphonity; Chaoseum; The Skys
1 October 2026	Hamburg	Germany	Markthalle	Symphonity; Chaoseum; The Skys
2 October 2026	Rostock	Germany	MAU Club	Symphonity; Chaoseum; The Skys
4 October 2026	Dresden	Germany	Park Hotel	Symphonity; Chaoseum; The Skys
5 October 2026	Jena	Germany	F-Haus	Symphonity; Chaoseum; The Skys
6 October 2026	Munich	Germany	Backstage Werk	Symphonity; Chaoseum; The Skys
8 October 2026	Innsbruck	Austria	Music Hall	Symphonity; Chaoseum; The Skys
9 October 2026	Pratteln	Switzerland	Z7 Club	Symphonity; Chaoseum; The Skys
11 October 2026	Lindau	Germany	Vaudeville Club	Symphonity; Chaoseum; The Skys
12 October 2026	Cologne	Germany	Essigfabrik	Symphonity; Chaoseum; The Skys
13 October 2026	Frankfurt	Germany	Batschkapp	Symphonity; Chaoseum; The Skys
15 October 2026	Osnabrück	Germany	Hyde Park	Symphonity; Chaoseum; The Skys
16 October 2026	Gersthofen	Germany	Stadthalle	Symphonity; Chaoseum; The Skys
17 October 2026	Vienna	Austria	Simm City	Symphonity; Chaoseum; The Skys
25 October 2026	Mallorca	Spain	Full Metal Holiday	—N/a

List of 2027 concerts, showing date, city, country, venue and support acts
Date	City	Country	Venue	Support act
10 February 2027	Liège	Belgium	OM Centre	TBA
11 February 2027	Esch-sur-Alzette	Luxembourg	Rockhal	TBA
12 February 2027	Kaiserslautern	Germany	Kammgarn Hall	TBA
14 February 2027	Haarlem	Netherlands	Patronaat	TBA
15 February 2027	Groningen	Netherlands	De Oosterport	TBA
16 February 2027	Copenhagen	Denmark	Amager Bio	TBA
18 February 2027	Oslo	Norway	Rockefeller Music Hall	TBA
19 February 2027	Stockholm	Sweden	Fållan Hall	TBA
20 February 2027	Karlstad	Sweden	Nojes Fabriken	TBA
22 February 2027	Oulu	Finland	Tulli Sali	TBA
23 February 2027	Tampere	Finland	Pakkahuone Theatre	TBA
24 February 2027	Helsinki	Finland	Kulttuuritalo	TBA
14 March 2027	Varna	Bulgaria	Palace of Culture and Sports	TBA
15 March 2027	Bucharest	Romania	Sala Palatului	TBA
16 March 2027	Belgrad	Serbia	Hangar Luka	TBA
18 March 2027	Sofia	Bulgaria	Hristo Botev Hall	TBA
20 April 2027	Tallinn	Estonia	Helitejas Hall	TBA
21 April 2027	Riga	Latvia	Palladium	TBA
22 April 2027	Vilnius	Lithuania	LOFTAS Club	TBA
24 April 2027	Gdańsk	Poland	B90 Club	TBA
25 April 2027	Warsaw	Poland	Progresja Club	TBA
26 April 2027	Kraków	Poland	Studio Club	TBA
28 April 2027	Brno	Czech Republic	Sono Centrum	TBA
29 April 2027	Bratislava	Slovakia	Majestic Music Club	TBA
30 April 2027	Budapest	Hungary	Barba Negra Club	TBA
2 May 2027	Zagreb	Croatia	Tvornika Kulture	TBA
3 May 2027	Ljubljana	Slovenia	Cvetli Čarna	TBA
4 May 2027	Milan	Italy	Alcatraz Hall	TBA
27 May 2027	Rio de Janeiro	Brazil	Vivo Rio	TBA
29 May 2027	São Paulo	Brazil	Tokyo Marine Hall	TBA
30 May 2027	Belém	Brazil	Ginásio Altino Pimenta	TBA
1 June 2027	Porto Alegre	Brazil	Auditório Araújo Viana	TBA
3 June 2027	Curitiba	Brazil	Tork N' Roll	TBA
5 June 2027	Brasília	Brazil	Raven Hall	TBA
