= Aladin Music Hall =

Music venue, former ballroom and cinema in Hemelingen, Bremen, Germany

Coordinates: 53.0558°N 8.8853°E

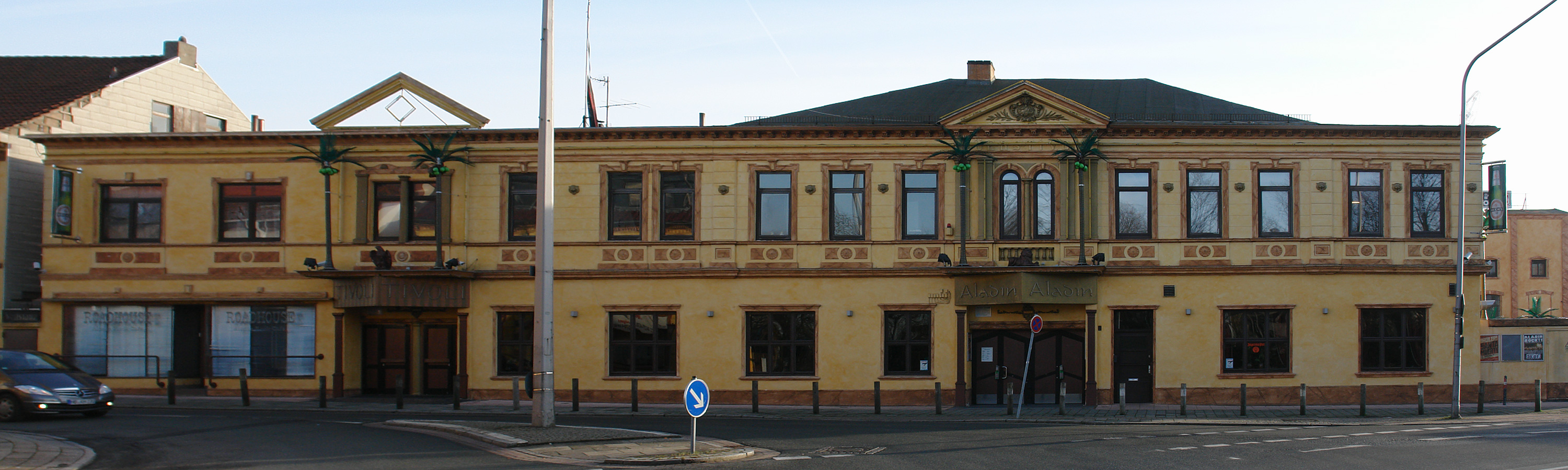
The Aladin Music Hall

The Aladin Music Hall is a nightclub located in Bremen, Germany. The club has hosted many famous artists over the years, including Saxon, Golden Earring, Foghat, Uriah Heep, Nirvana and Blue Öyster Cult. The Aladin opened in 1977.
