= Capitol (Hanover) =

Live music venue in Hanover, Germany

Coordinates: 52°22′5.5″N 9°43′13.7″E

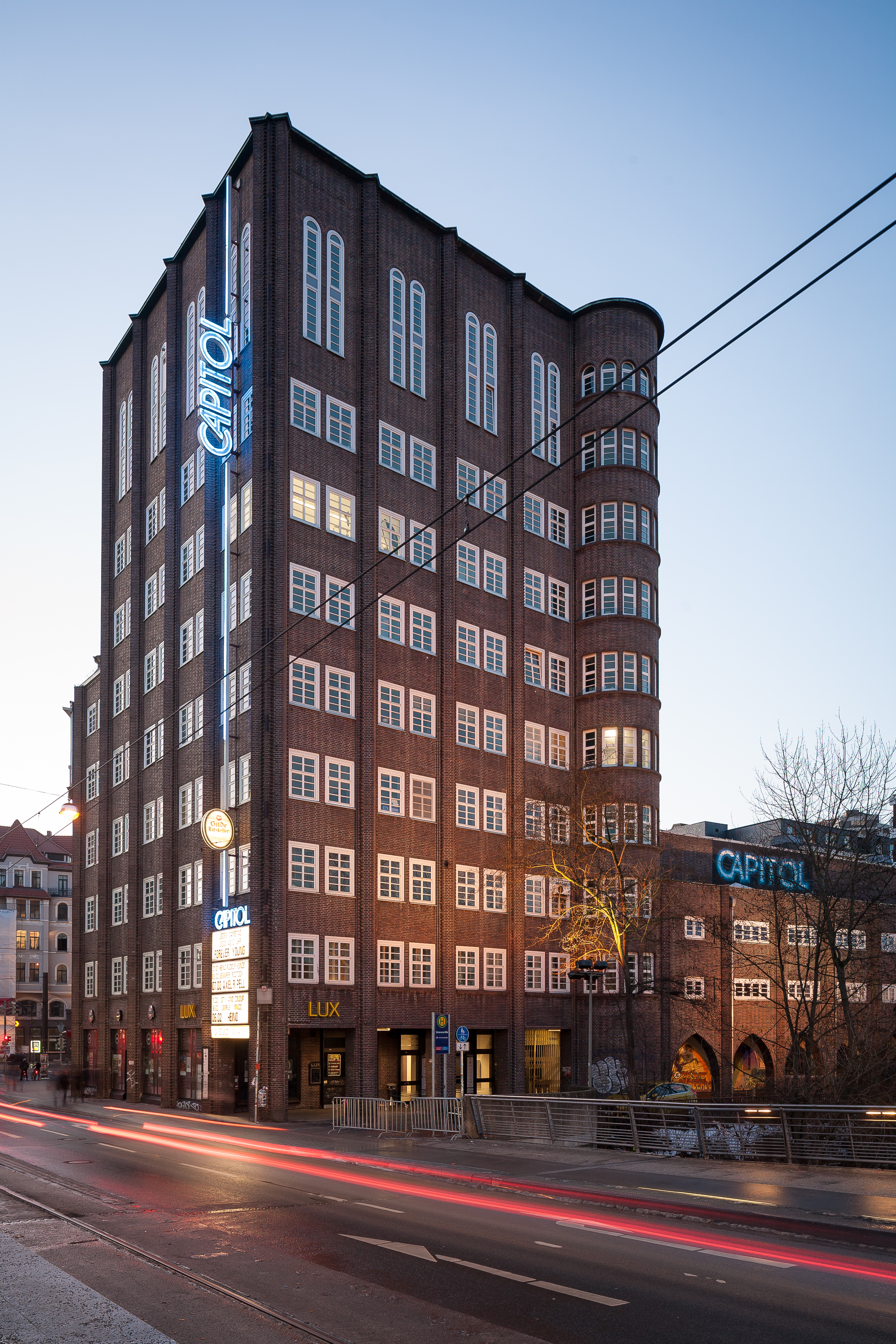
The Capitol

The Capitol is a 1,800-capacity live music venue in Hanover, Germany. It has hosted artists such as Red Hot Chili Peppers, Rory Gallagher, Iggy Pop and Robin Trower. It is located in a building erected in 1930 built in Brick Expressionism style and uses rooms of a former cinema.
