= Kulturfabrik Esch-sur-Alzette =

Kulturfabrik
- KuFa
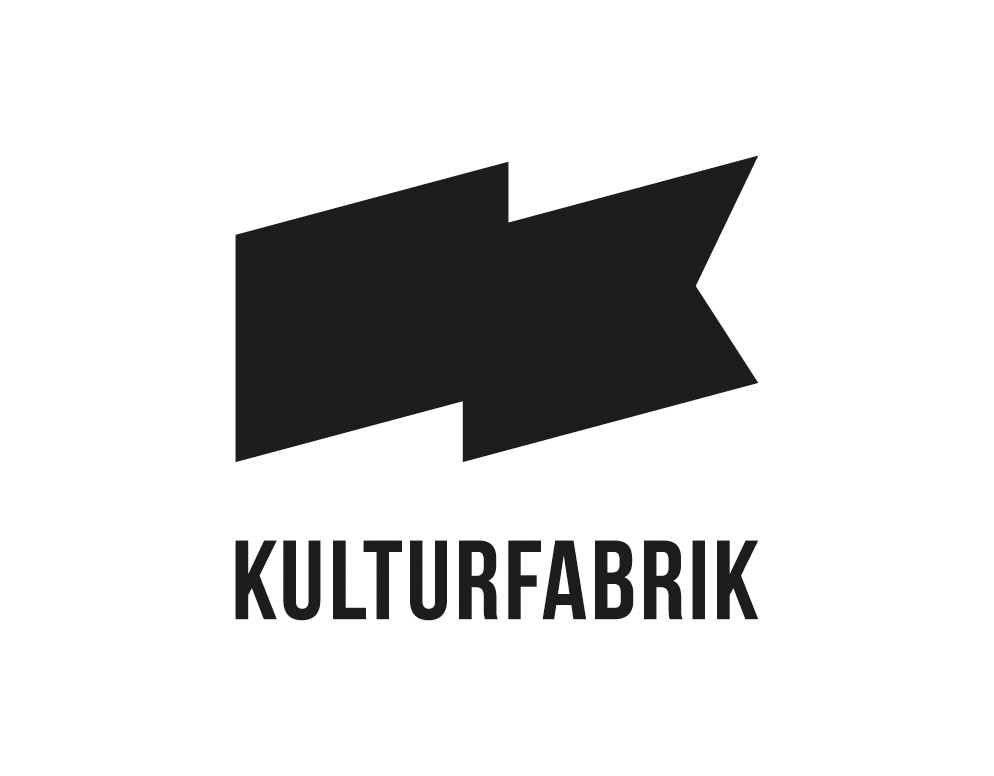

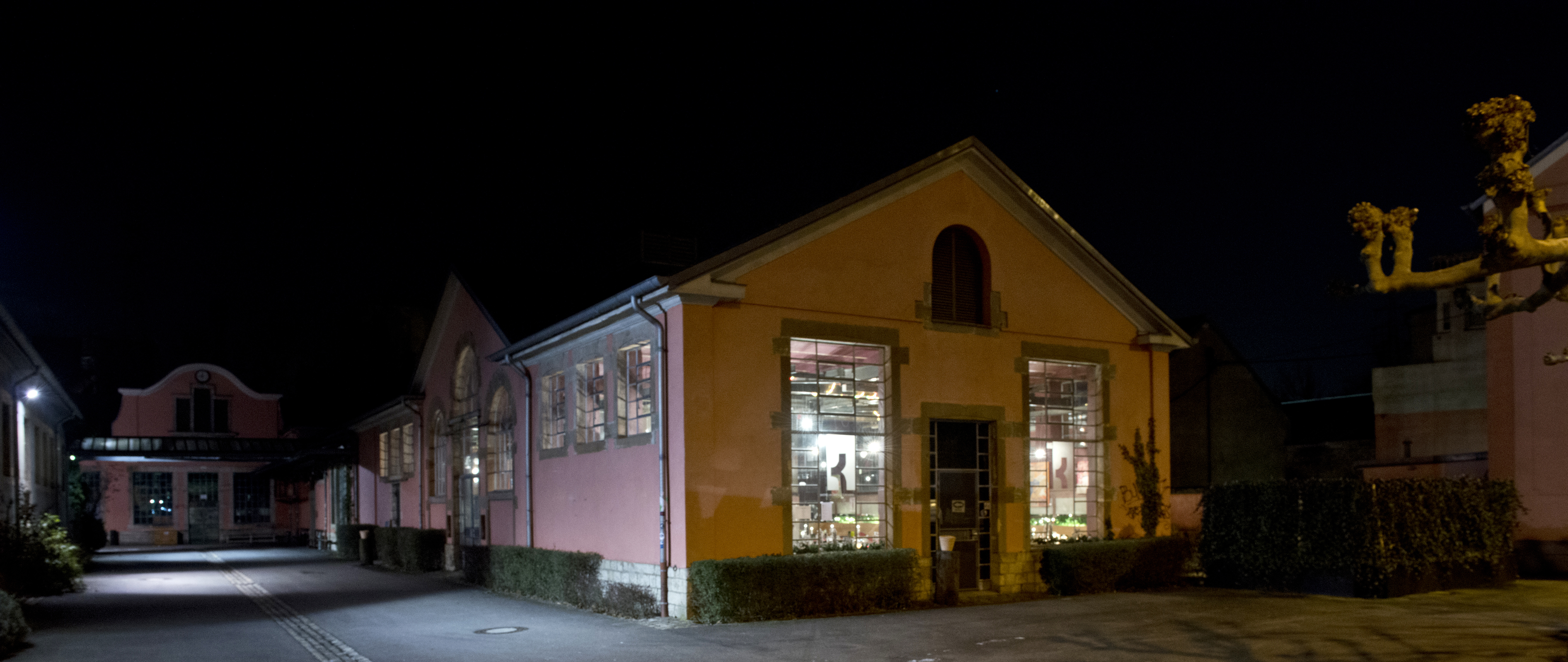
- The Kulturfabrik by night

- Location within Luxembourg
- Address: 116, rue de Luxembourg, L-4221
- Location: Esch-sur-Alzette
- Coordinates: 49°30′14″N 5°59′15″E
- Capacity: 900
- Type: Cultural centre

Construction
- Built: 1885-6
- Opened: 1998
- Renovated: 1996

Website
- kulturfabrik.lu

Kulturfabrik Esch-sur-Alzette (KuFa) is a cultural centre located in a former slaughterhouse in the city of Esch-sur-Alzette in Luxembourg. As of 2019, the state-funded centre attracts almost 80,000 visitors a year.

== History ==
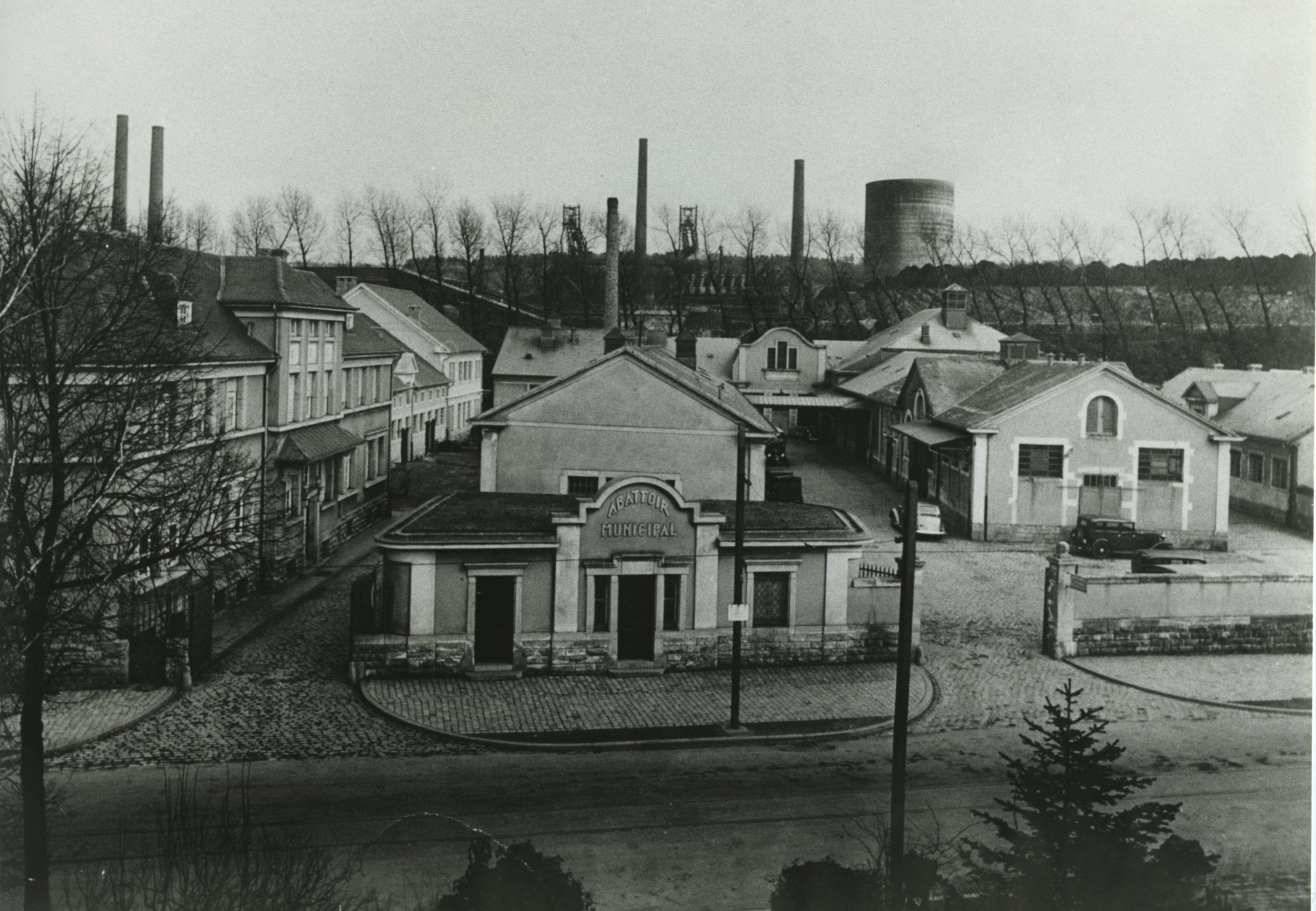
The old slaughterhouse of Esch-sur-Alzette

From the 1880s until 1979, the complex of buildings served as the public slaughterhouse house of the city of Esch-sur-Alzette. Then in 1982 the buildings were squatted by the Theater GmbH, which used the spaces for rehearsals and performances. This was formalised by the creation of a non-profit organisation in 1983. The Kulturfabrik became a cultural centre with state support in 1996. It received a renovation grant of 1.93 million euros, and in 2002 was receiving 308,000 euros yearly to cover running costs. The Kulturfabrik opened officially in 1998.

== Activities ==
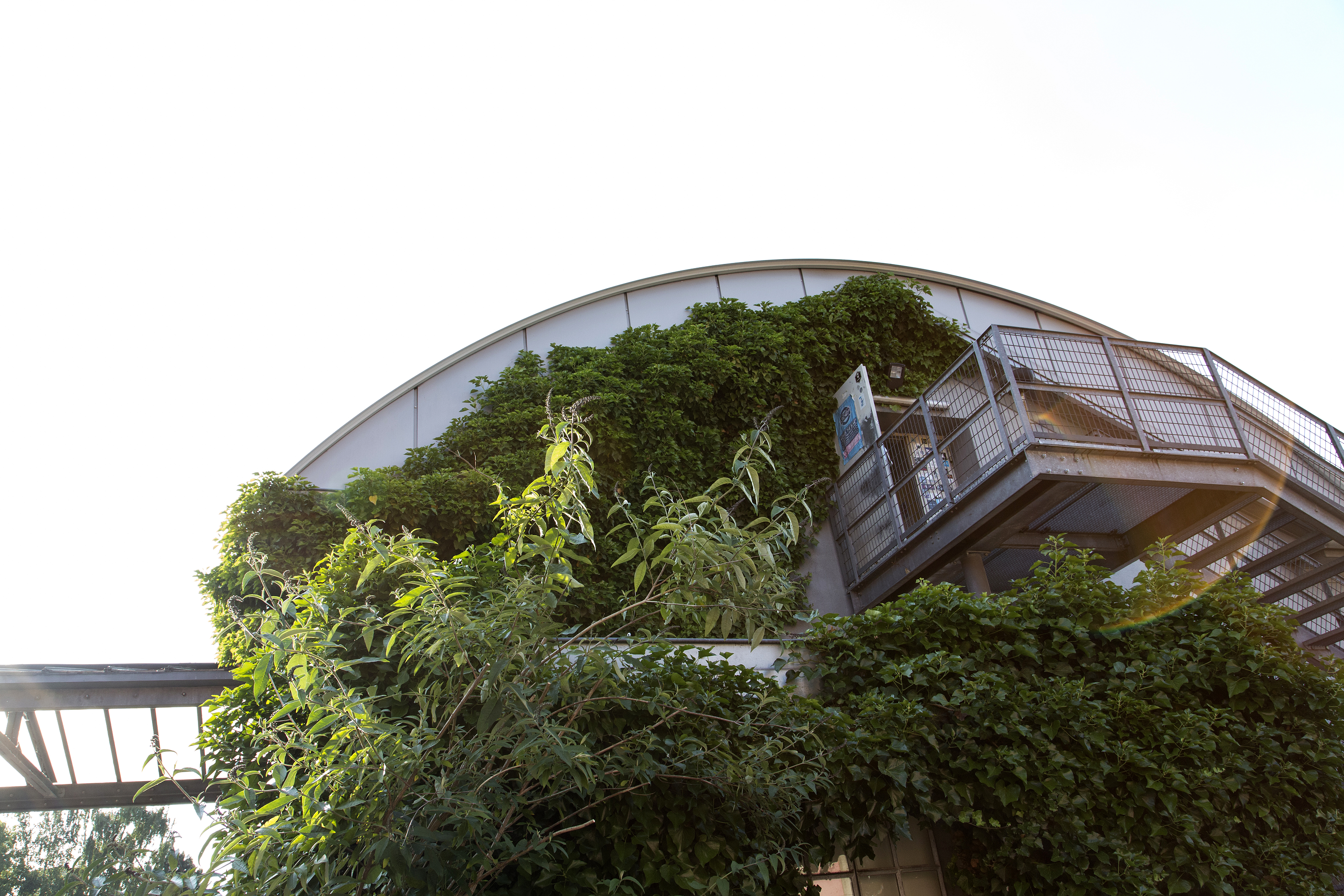
The Kulturfabrik

The Kulturfabrik is used as a cultural centre for artist residencies and as a platform for sustainable development. As of 2019, the centre attracts almost 80,000 visitors yearly. There are 21 employees on permanent contracts and 6 on fixed term contracts.

The music venue has a capacity of 900 people. The centre also has a cinema, a café and a restaurant.
