= Jolly Joker (venues chain) =

Turkish entertainment company

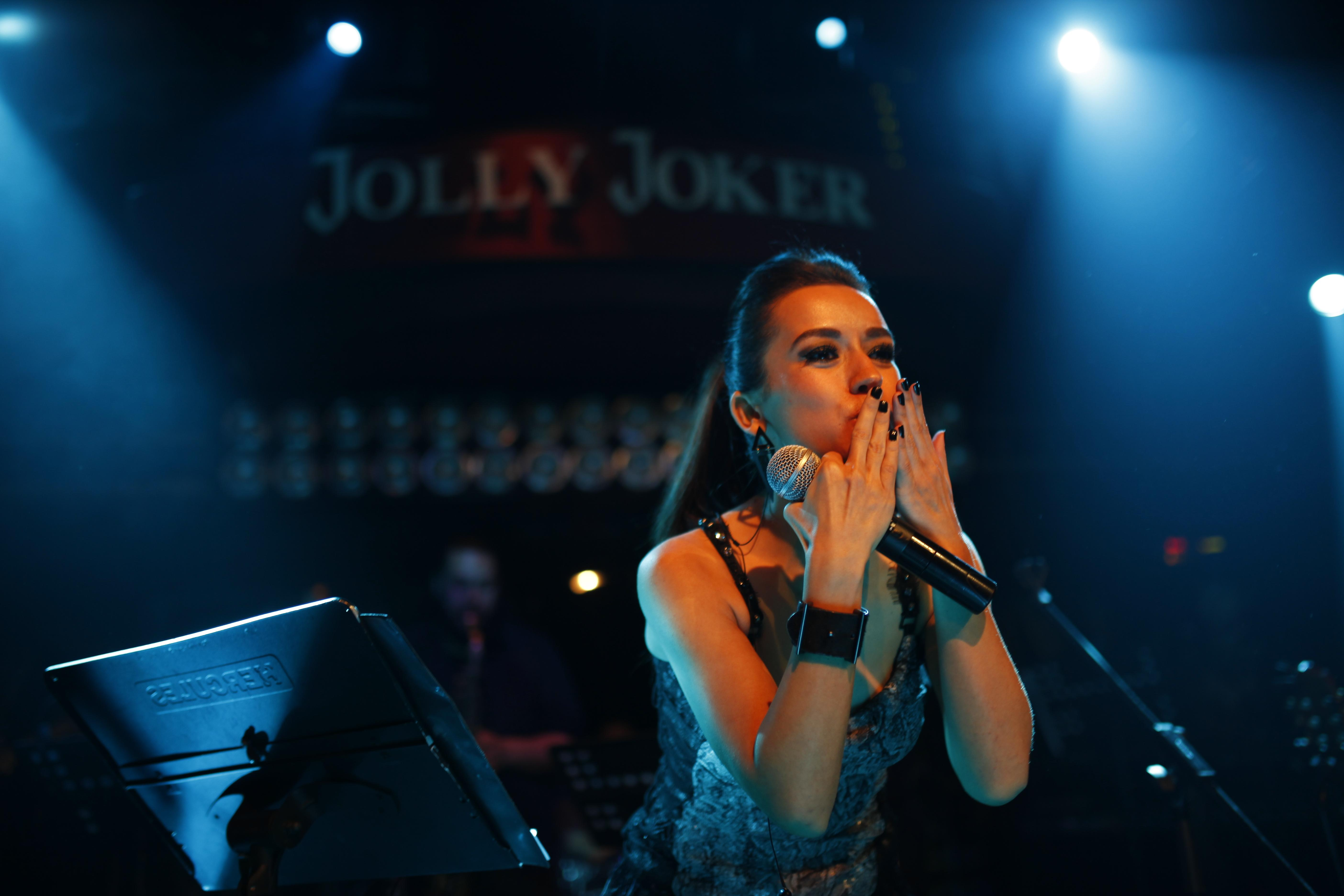
Tuğba Yurt performing at Jolly Joker in Istanbul, 2015

Jolly Joker is an entertainment chain in Turkey that started in Antalya. It has nine locations: two in Istanbul and one in Adana, Ankara, Antalya, Bursa, İzmir, Gaziantep, and Mersin, respectively. The venues host many concerts attended by famous Turkish artists, as well as entertainment parties.

The business announced that they held 850 events in 2019 and that more than 4 million people came to watch the concerts. It plans to open new branches in Büyükçekmece, İzmir and Bodrum until the end of 2020. Jolly Joker tried to open a branch in Kocaeli twice through franchising, but faced various legal problems.
