= Centro de Congresos Querétaro =

Multipurpose convention center and indoor arena in Queretaro, Mexico

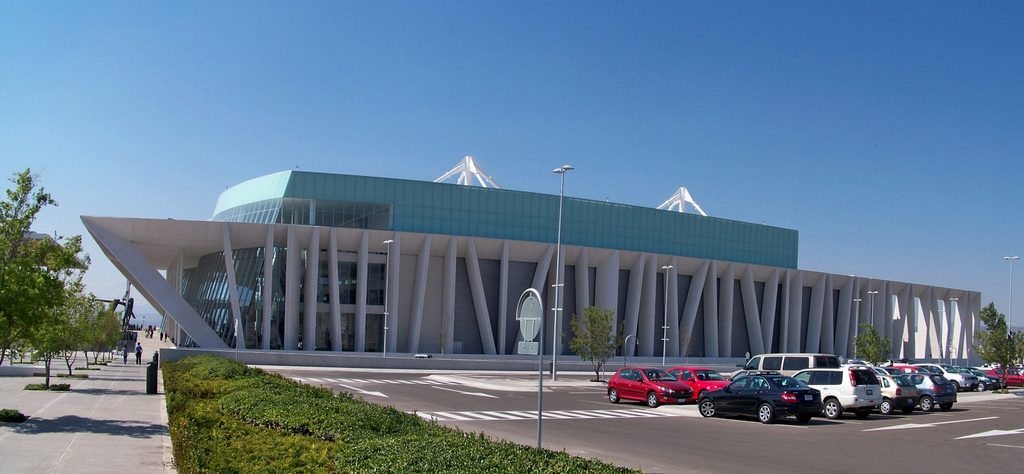
Centro de Congresos Queretaro in 2013

Centro de Congresos Queretaro is a multipurpose convention center and indoor arena located in Queretaro, Queretaro. Due to the continued growth of both the city and the state, construction began in 2007 and, after a two-year pause, eventually finished in 2011. Prior to the completion of the Centro de Congresos, the Auditorio Josefa Ortiz de Dominguez was the largest indoor venue in Queretaro. However, that arena had been built in 1985, when Queretaro's population was less than half its current population. The growth of Queretaro's population eventually escalated to the point that a venue with a much larger capacity was needed, resulting in this venue.

== Gran Salon Queretaro ==
The largest indoor venue in the state of Queretaro with a seating capacity of up to 6,000 and 6,570 square meters (70,700 square feet) of exhibition apace, Gran Salon Queretaro is used for exhibitions, trade shows, concerts, sporting events, conventions and sometimes beauty pageants such as the Nuestra Belleza Queretaro pageant. It can be divided into four separate rooms and has a ceiling height of 11.2 meters (37 feet). For trade shows, the hall can accommodate 328 stands. In front of the Gran Salon Queretaro is a 2,340-square-meter (25,200-square-foot) outdoor terrace.

Among the earliest entertainment acts at the Gran Salon Queretaro were Ximena Sarinana, Sheyla Tadeo and Los Tigres del Norte.

== Casa de los Corregidores ==
The Casa de los Corregidores is the name of the Convention Center's ballroom, with a capacity of 2,800, a ceiling height of 7.5 meters (25 feet) and 4,604 square meters (49,560 square feet) of space. It is used for banquets, conferences and conventions.

== Teatro Metropolitano ==
The Teatro Metropolitano is a performing arts complex consisting of a 1,335-seat concert hall used for concerts, stage shows and orchestra performances and two smaller theaters, one of which seats 330 and is used for local plays, and the 120-seat Sala de Danza, used for dance recitals
