= Markize =

- Origin: Paris, Moscow
- Genres: Pop-Rock, Alternative metal, gothic metal
- Years active: 2003-present
- Labels: Edenrecord; Underclass; Metal Agen
- Members: Alina Dunaevskaya; David Verbecq; Franck Chentrier; Julien De Feyssal
- Website: Markize.com

Markize is a French-Russian rock band founded in 2003 by the singer-songwriter Alina Dunaevskaya and drummer David Verbecq.

== History ==
In September 2010, Tarja Turunen chose Markize to play with her on the most beautiful scenes of Europe. The band followed Tarja as her main support in Poland, Russia, Ukraine, Czech Republic, Netherlands, United Kingdom, Finland, France, Switzerland, Germany and Belgium.

== Line-up ==
- Alina Dunaevskaya : Vocals, keyboards
- David Verbecq : Drums
- Franck Chentrier : Guitars
- Julien De Feyssal : Bass

== Discography ==
=== Albums ===
- Poussières de Vie (2004)
- Transparence (2007)
- Transparence (Re-release) (2009)
- A Perfect Lie (2012)

=== Videos ===
- "Mon Ange"
- "In My Dream" (Live Acoustic TV)
- "Transparence" (Live Acoustic TV)
- "Poussières de Vie" (Live Acoustic TV)
- "Mechanical Hearts" (2012)
