= Le Transbordeur =

Coordinates: 45°47′02″N 4°51′39″E

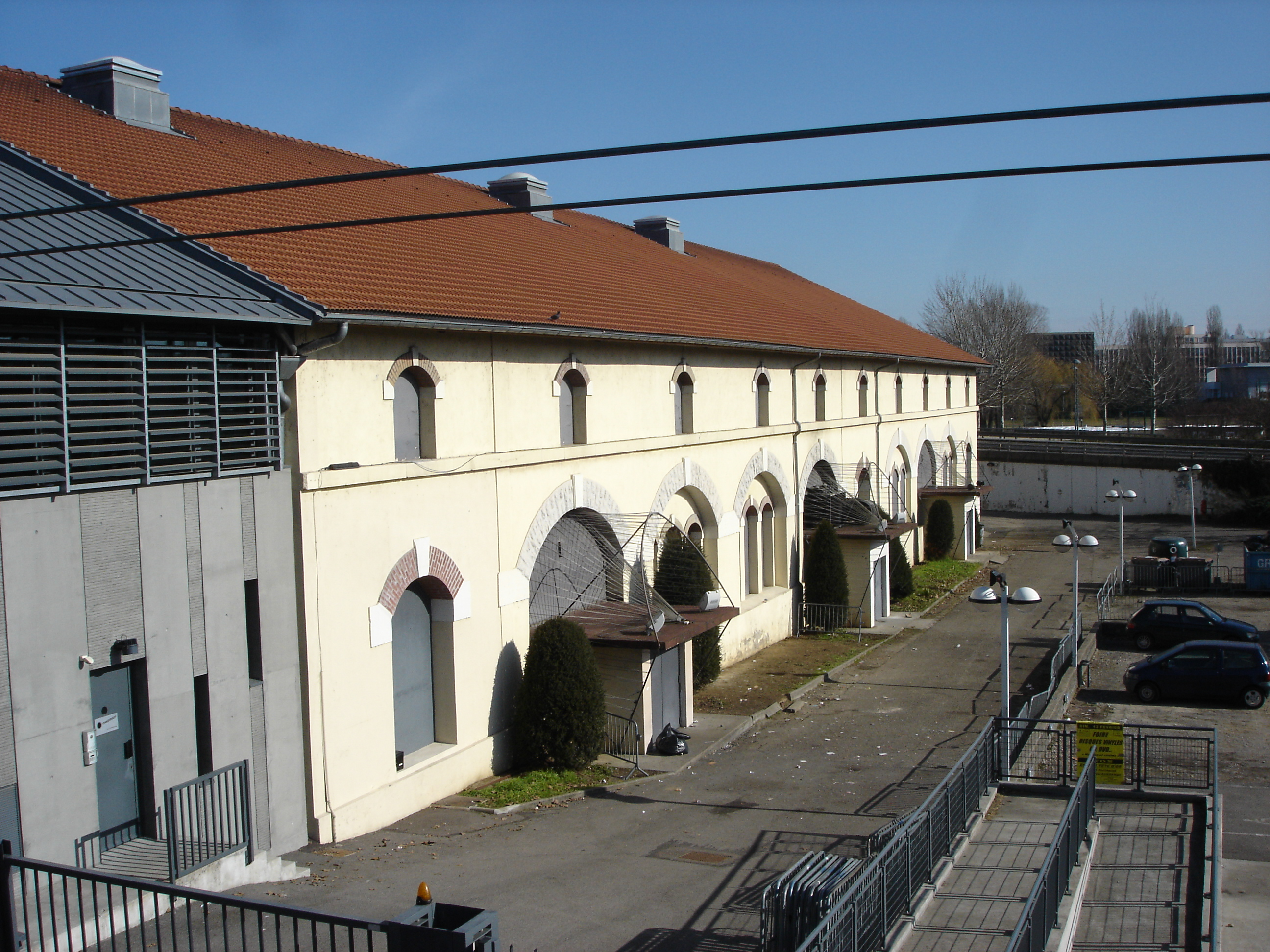
Le Transbordeur

Le Transbordeur (French pronunciation: [lə tʁɑ̃sbɔʁdœʁ]) is a 1,800-seat concert hall located in Villeurbanne, France. It was inaugurated in 1989.

Notable past performers include Lorde, Tool, Blue Öyster Cult, Robert Plant, Megadeth, Motörhead, Porcupine Tree, Lenny Kravitz, Pixies (1991), SUGAR (1993), Simple Minds (2010), Nick Cave & The Bad Seeds (2011), Boy George (2014) and Mogwai (2022).
