= Forum Palace =

Indoor arena in Vilnius, Lithuania

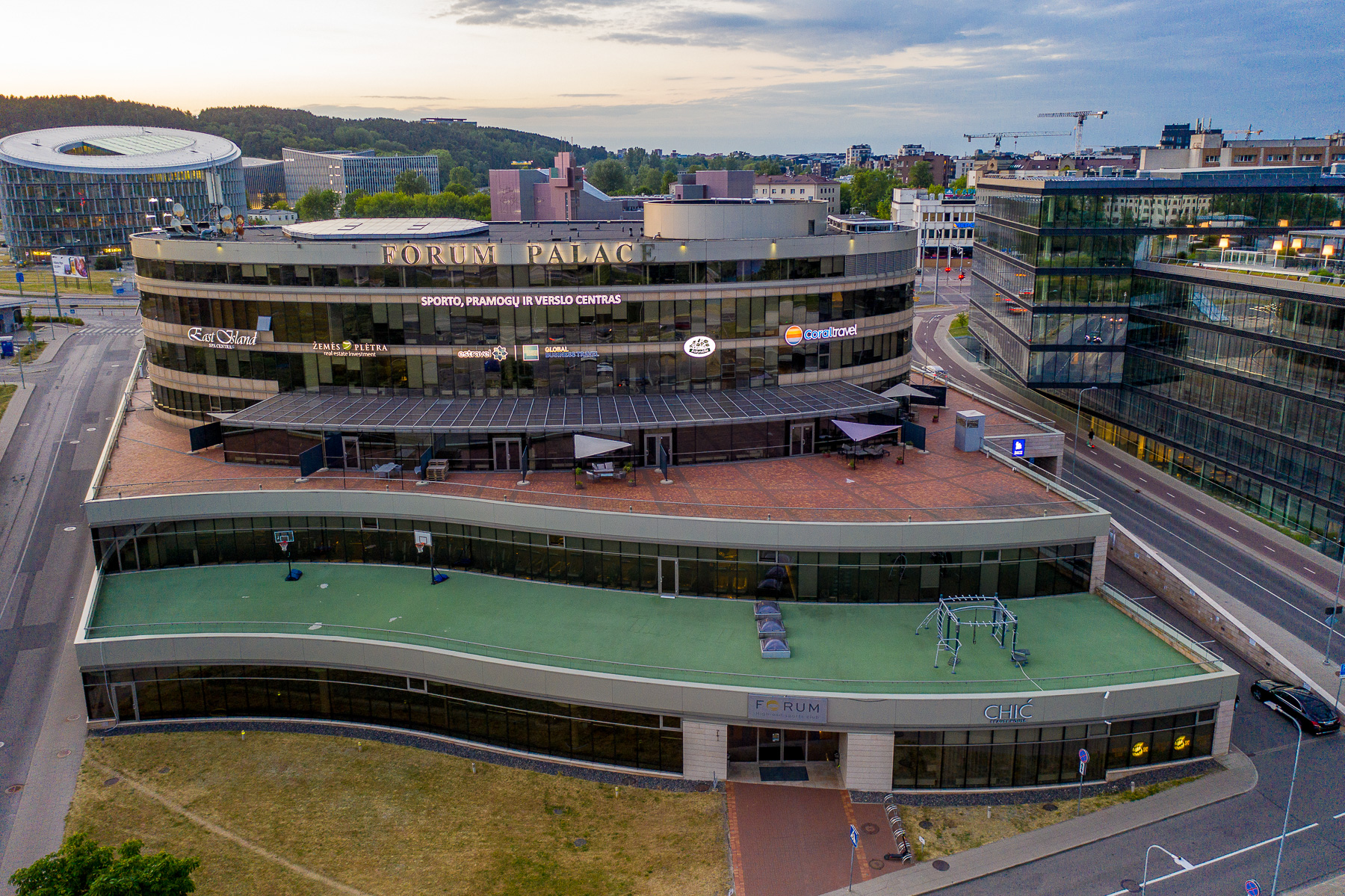
- Interactive map of Forum Palace
- Address: Konstitucijos pr. 26
- Location: Vilnius, Lithuania
- Coordinates: 54°41′50″N 25°16′0″E
- Capacity: 1,600

Construction
- Groundbreaking: 1999–2002
- Opened: 2003
- Architects: UAB “Architektūros linija”, Gintaras Čaikauskas

Forum Palace is a commercial center and indoor arena in Vilnius. The arena is located near to the Vilnius financial centre in Konstitucija avenue. Forum Palace is often used to host music events and concerts.
