= LKA Longhorn =

Music venue in Stuttgart, Germany (e. 1984)

Coordinates: 48°46′02″N 9°15′06″E

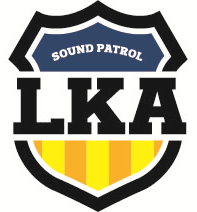
The logo as of 1012

LKA Longhorn is a 1,500-capacity music venue located in Stuttgart, Germany. Founded in 1984, the venue was originally a country and western club. By 1987 the club expanded to other genres of music such as pop and rock. Some of the notable artists that performed at the venue include Nirvana, Blue Öyster Cult, Uriah Heep, Faith No More and Golden Earring.
