= Best of: Living the Dream =

Compilation album by Tarja
- Released: 2 December 2022
- Recorded: 2007–2022
- Genre: Symphonic metal
- Length: 77:34
- Label: earMUSIC
- Producer: Tarja Turunen

Tarja chronology
In the Raw (2019)	Best of: Living the Dream (2022)	Dark Christmas (2023)

Singles from Best of: Living the Dream
- 1. "Eye of the Storm" Released: 21 October 2022

Best of: Living the Dream is the first solo compilation album by the Finnish singer Tarja Turunen. It was released on 2 December 2022 and features remastered versions of old songs hand-picked by Tarja as well as a new single entitled "Eye of the Storm". The compilation album was released in multiple formats: a CD, vinyl, mediabook, and limited edition box-set, with each new format including more songs ranging into her other genres of work.

== Background ==
On Best of: Living the Dream, Tarja combines her most famous hits as well as hard-to-find rarities into one compilation album, including songs from all of her studio albums. Each song is remastered. She also includes a new song, Eye of the Storm on the album, a cut song from her third studio album Colours in the Dark.

Tarja stated, "After all these years, I still really can't believe it's time for me to release a proper, 'Best Of' album. An album that contains my personal favorite rock tracks from my six albums – My Winter Storm, What Lies Beneath, Colours in the Dark, The Brightest Void, The Shadow Self and In the Raw. It's really amazing to think that it's been 15 years since I started my solo career. Where on earth all these years have gone? I don't know. So many beautiful moments, unbelievable. But I'm truly happy that I have been able to create music that first of all had made me happy. And I've seen that I have made many people happy. With 15 years of beautiful memories to look over, it has been a dream to put together this collection. And I really hope that you will enjoy this as much as I did while making it."

== Touring ==
Tarja announced her Living the Dream tour on 31 January 2023, which began in the United States. She later announced that along with the tour, Marko Hietala would be joining the tour, making this their first time touring together since they were both members of Nightwish in 2005. The tour with Marko began in 2024, and featured Nightwish hits such as "Dead To The World" and "Wish I Had An Angel", as well as the premiere of a new song with Marko entitled "Left on Mars".

== Track listing ==
Disc one
No.	Title	Original CD/Digital release	Length
1.	"Eye of the Storm"		6:05
2.	"I Walk Alone" (Single Version)	My Winter Storm (2007)	4:01
3.	"Die Alive" (Alternative Version)	My Winter Storm (2007)	4:10
4.	"Enough"	My Winter Storm (2007)	5:13
5.	"Falling Awake" (Single Version, Jason Hook Solo)	What Lies Beneath (2010)	4:43
6.	"Until My Last Breath" (Single Version)	What Lies Beneath (2010)	3:52
7.	"I Feel Immortal" (Radio Remix)	What Lies Beneath (2007)	4:31
8.	"Victim of Ritual"	Colours in the Dark (2013)	5:55
9.	"500 Letters"	Colours in the Dark (2013)	4:22
10.	"Never Enough"	Colours in the Dark (2013)	5:23
11.	"Innocence" (Radio Edit)	The Shadow Self (2016)	4:16
12.	"Demons in You"	The Shadow Self (2016)	4:44
13.	"Diva"	The Shadow Self (2016)	5:45
14.	"Dead Promises"	In The Raw (2019)	5:50
15.	"Tears in Rain"	In The Raw (2019)	4:28
16.	"You and I" (Band Version)	In The Raw (2019)	4:09
Total length:			71:34

Disc two
No.	Title	2xCD + Blu-ray version	Length
1.	"Oasis"	My Winter Storm (2007)	5:11
2.	"Sing For Me"	My Winter Storm (2007)	4:13
3.	"Anteroom of Death" (Edit Version)	What Lies Beneath (2010)	4:09
4.	"In for a Kill"	What Lies Beneath (2010)	4:41
5.	"Naiad"	What Lies Beneath (2010)	7:11
6.	"Crimson Deep"	What Lies Beneath (2010)	7:34
7.	"Mystique Voyage"	Colours in the Dark (2013)	7:13
8.	"Deliverance"	Colours in the Dark (2013)	7:27
9.	"Into the Sun" (Studio Version)	Left in the Dark (2014)	6:10
10.	"Eagle Eye"	The Shadow Self (2016)	5:01
11.	"Too Many"	The Shadow Self (2016)	7:49
12.	"Love to Hate"	The Shadow Self (2016)	5:57
13.	"Shadow Play"	In The Raw (2019)	7:21
Total length:			1:19:58

== Charts ==
Chart performance for Dark Christmas
Chart (2023)	Peak position
Finnish Albums (Suomen virallinen lista)	8
German Albums (Offizielle Top 100)	41
UK Rock and Metal Albums (BPI)	11

== Personnel ==
- Art direction – Marcelo Isaac Cabuli, Tarja Turunen
- Artwork – Sebastian Rohde
- Cover art – Tim Tronckoe
- Mastered by – Justin Shturtz
- Vocals – Tarja Turunen, Alissa White-Gluz (on track 12), Björn Strid (on track 14)
