= Kevin Chown =

American bassist (1969–2026)

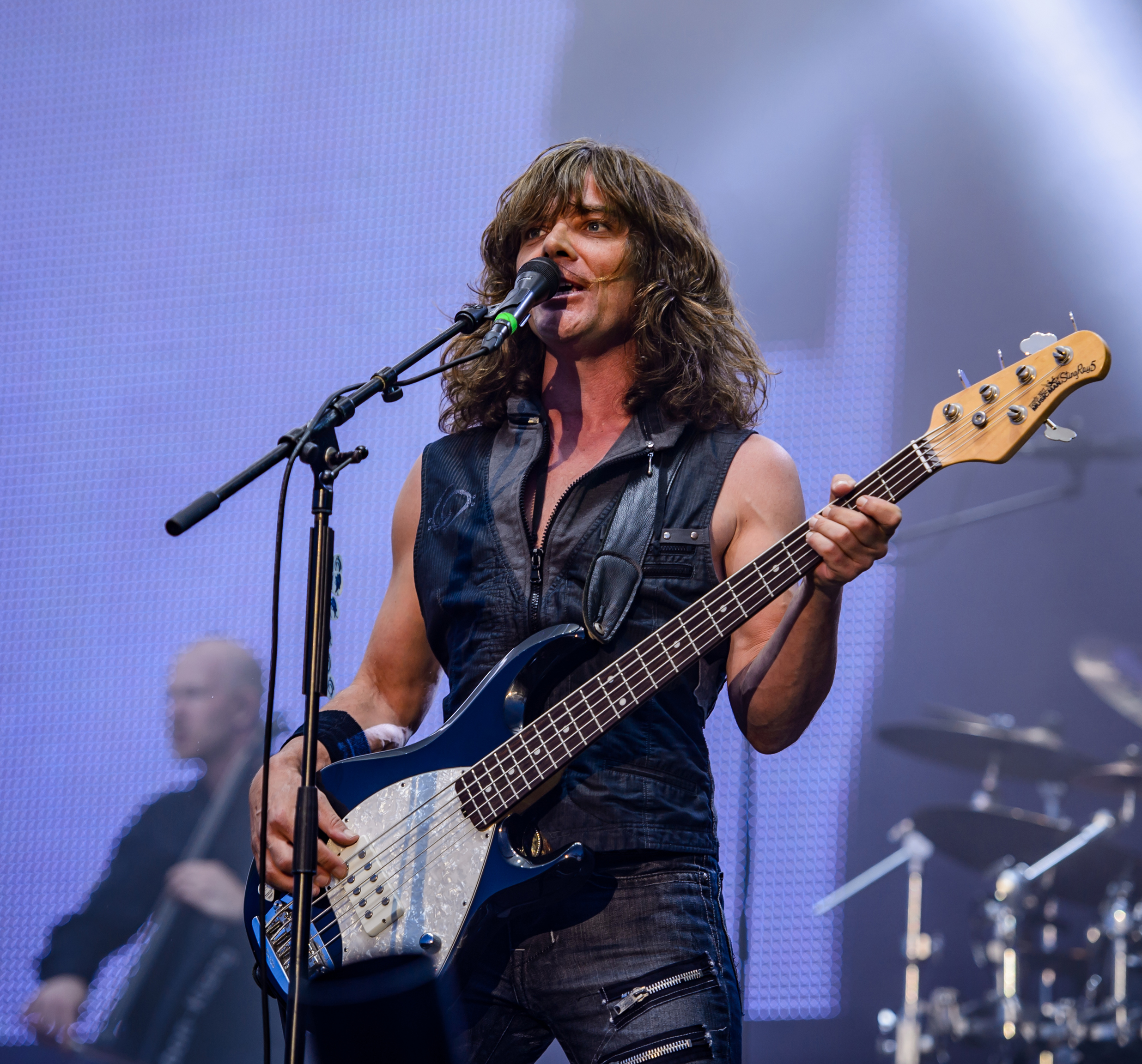
- Chown at Wacken Open Air 2016

Background information
- Born: Kevin John Chown; December 24, 1969; Escanaba, Michigan, U.S.
- Died: July 6, 2026 (aged 56)
- Genres: Progressive rock, heavy metal, rock, jazz, funk
- Occupation: Bassist
- Years active: 1984–2026

Kevin John Chown (December 24, 1969 – July 6, 2026) was an American bass player best known for his work with Finnish vocalist Tarja Turunen, funk/rock/fusion quartet Chad Smith's Bombastic Meatbats, and progressive metal bands Edwin Dare and Artension.

In addition to the Bombastic Meatbats, he was a member of Steelheart, instrumental groups Cosmosquad and Der Elefant as well as L.A. blues rockers Bleeding Harp, and has performed and recorded with artists such as Paul Gilbert, Sebastian Bach, Uncle Kracker, Chuck Berry, Ted Nugent, Tony MacAlpine, Jeff Kollman, and Tiles. Chown resided in the Los Angeles area where he worked as an in-demand session player, writer, producer and sometime television actor in addition to his band commitments.

Chown was one of the cast members of season 8 of Swedish reality show Allt för Sverige and became a regular on WDBC radio with host Craig Woerpel during the COVID-19 pandemic.

== Early life ==
Chown was born and raised in rural Escanaba, Michigan, and grew up in a very musical environment. His father was a high school band teacher and his mother gave private piano lessons. He originally started out on drums but soon switched to bass guitar after hearing John Paul Jones and Led Zeppelin and began performing professionally at age 15 with a popular local band called Tyrant.

== Detroit years ==
After a year at Bay College, Chown moved to Detroit to attend Wayne State University where he earned a bachelor's degree in jazz studies and was honored as "College Jazz Soloist of the Year" in 1993 at the Montreux Detroit Jazz Festival. At the same time, Chown also pursued his love of rock'n'roll and played with several bands around Detroit. While attending the NAMM Show in Anaheim, CA in 1991, Chown crossed paths with guitarist Jeff Kollman and soon joined his Toledo, OH-based progressive metal band, Edwin Dare. The group quickly garnered a strong following throughout parts of the Midwest and released 3 studio albums in the 1990s which were particularly well received in Japan. Chown would also release an all-instrumental solo album, Freudian Slip, in 1996.

While playing with Edwin Dare, Chown also developed a reputation as a producer and session musician working out of his own Detroit-based studio. Among others, he became heavily involved with local progressive rock band Tiles, producing and playing on three of their albums, Tiles (1994), Fence the Clear (1997) and Presents of Mind (1998). He also wrote and produced songs and jingles for the Detroit Red Wings, the Detroit Tigers, Little Caesars Pizza and The Weather Channel, among others. In 1997, Chown briefly worked with Detroit rock icon Ted Nugent after being introduced by local rock singer Steve Black, Nugent's radio co-host. He would perform live in-studio with Nugent on his radio program on a couple of occasions.

In the mid 1990s, Chown was featured in Guitar Player magazine's 'Spotlight' column which led to a working relationship with GP columnist Mike Varney, also the head of Shrapnel Records. Chown became the bass player for newly formed multi-national progressive metal group Artension, recording 2 studio albums, Into the Eye of the Storm (1996) and Phoenix Rising (1997) for Shrapnel. He left the group in 1998 but would participate in the recording of two more albums, Sacred Pathways (2002) and New Discovery (2003). He also recorded albums with guitar virtuosos Tony MacAlpine (Violent Machine, 1996), Jeff Kollman (Into The Unknown, 1996), and George Bellas (Turn of the Millenium, 1997), and contributed bass to two releases by progressive metal band Magnitude 9.

== Move to Los Angeles ==
Chown moved to Los Angeles in 1997 and quickly became a much in-demand session player, re-teaming with his old Edwin Dare cohort Jeff Kollman on various projects, producing acclaimed drummer Mike Terrana's 1999 solo album, Shadow of the Past, guesting on vocalist John West's Earth Maker (2002), and playing on a long list of soundtracks for TV and film. In addition, he picked up work as an actor, always playing a musician, and had various recurring on-screen acting performances, including on the television series How I Met Your Mother. Chown also landed the coveted bass gig with platinum selling artist Uncle Kracker and toured the country in support of No Stranger to Shame, culminating in a double header home town gig in Escanaba in late 2003.

In 2005, Chown became the bassist and co-musical director for Ivan Kane's Royal Jelly, a burlesque show with a residency at Hollywood's Forty Deuce club; the troupe made a national TV appearance on Jimmy Kimmel Live! in October 2006 performing the Aerosmith classic "Walk This Way". Chown and fellow Royal Jelly musicians, Jeff Kollman and Charlie Waymire, also recorded an album of original music under the name JKB. Bleeding the Soul was issued in 2004 and accompanied by a promotional video for the song "By Myself", shot at club Forty Deuce.

In the summer of 2008, Chown joined rock and roll icon Chuck Berry for his appearance at the Long Beach Blues Festival. Chown was also brought into the Chad Smith's Bombastic Meatbats fold, a 1970s-fusion/funk-oriented quartet led by Red Hot Chili Peppers drummer Chad Smith, and featuring keyboardist Ed Roth and Chown's long-time musical companion, Jeff Kollman, on guitar. The band made their live debut at the 2008 NAMM Show, followed by a short tour of Japan, and released their debut album, Meet the Meatbats, the following year. The group toured Japan twice more, with Matt Sorum and Kenny Aronoff filling in for Smith, and have since issued two more albums, More Meat (2010) and Live Meat And Potatoes (2012). The group appeared at the Guitar Center Drum-Off at L.A.'s Club Nokia in early January 2014 where they were joined by guitar legend Steve Lukather.

In 2011, Chown got the call to join former Nightwish vocalist Tarja Turunen on her world tour in support of her album What Lies Beneath, which included shows all across Europe and South America. The latter was documented via the Act I: Live in Rosario DVD (2012); Chown also appears on Tarja's three most recent studio recordings, Colours in the Dark (2013), which debuted Top 10 in half a dozen European countries, The Brightest Void (2016), and The Shadow Self (2016). The latter two also feature Chown's Bombastic Meatbats bandmate, Chad Smith, on select songs. Chown appears in the "No Bitter End" promotional video and took part in the band's extensive Far East and European tours, highlighted by an appearance at Germany's prestigious Wacken Open Air festival on August 5 in front of some 80,000 fans.

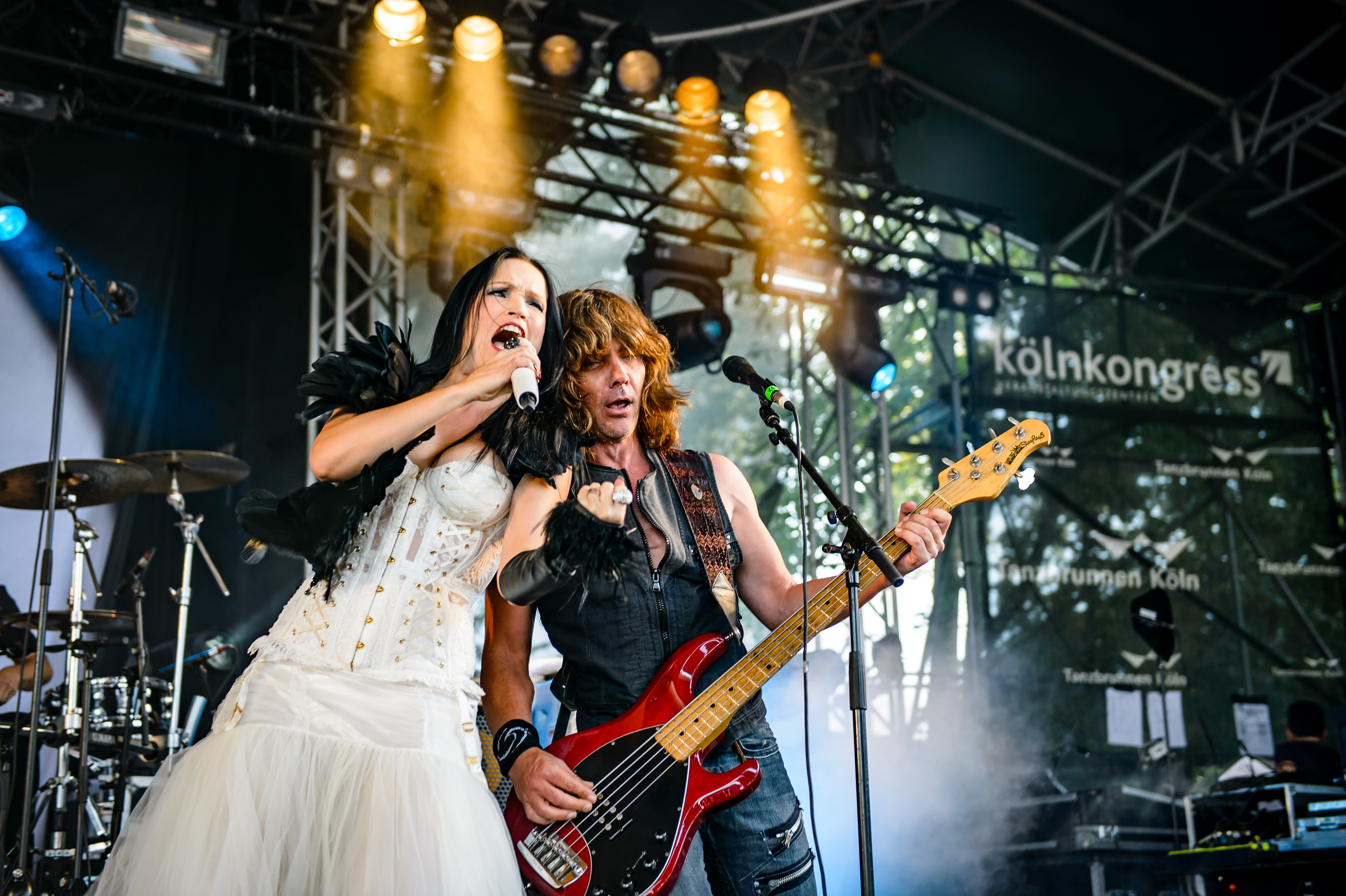
Chown performing alongside Tarja Turunen, 2016

In March 2015, former Skid Row vocalist Sebastian Bach announced the addition of Chown to his touring band. He made his live debut with Bach during a 10-date tour around the Southwest; a full-fledged US tour followed in the summer of 2015. He was also approached by guitarist Paul Gilbert and invited to help record his latest Kevin Shirley produced album, I Can Destroy, released in late 2015 in Japan and worldwide in 2016.

In late 2016, Chown, along with fellow Tarja band members Alex Scholpp and Timm Schreiner, released a three-song EP under the name Der Elefant, accompanied by a video for the song "Elefante".

In December 2016, Chown was announced as the new bassist and official band member of progressive metal/fusion trio, Cosmosquad, featuring guitarist Jeff Kollman and drummer Shane Gaalaas. Chown is featured on the group's latest studio album, The Morbid Tango, released in early 2017. Chown and Kollman were also part of the Bleeding Harp line-up that recorded the 2018 release, Truth, which features a guest vocal appearance by Doug Pinnick of King's X fame on a cover of The Allman Brothers Band classic "Whipping Post".

In November 2018, Chown announced the digital-only re-release of his 2 solo efforts, Freudian Slip (1996) and Light the Way (2013), titled Kevin Chown. In addition, the re-mastered 2-for-1 package also includes 3 previously unreleased bonus tracks, "Detroit Shuffle", featuring guitarist Jeff Kollman, "Paris", and "Move the People". Chown is also featured on Tarja's 2018 multi-format release Act II, available on DVD, Blu-ray, CD and vinyl.

On September 1, 2019, Chown announced that he would be leaving Tarja after a 9-year stint with the band and join former Skid Row frontman Sebastian Bach for a fall U.S. tour and that he had begun working with singer/songwriter Trevor Ohlsen in his hometown of Escanaba, MI.

== Bout with epilepsy ==
Chown, who had been battling epilepsy since he was a teenager, underwent brain surgery at USC Medical Center in Los Angeles, CA on May 2, 2013, after suffering several seizures over the previous months.

"It's taken me years to finally acknowledge my condition publicly, even to my closest friends. As strange as it seems, embracing who I really am to everyone in my life, even my closest friends, has taken just as much or more courage than it has taken me to consider brain surgery. For decades, I have carried this around with me, worried what people would think. I feel like I am half way home already by simply embracing the reality of my situation."

A special set up GoFundMe.com page raised thousands of dollars in contributions from friends and fans to help offset Chown's considerable out-of-pocket expenses from his medical procedures. He issued the Light The Way EP, which was released digitally on May 8 and was accompanied by a promotional video for the song "We Light the Way". Vocalist Angel Travis, guitarist Jeff Kollman, drummer Jono Brown, and backing vocalist Marian Tomas Griffin all lent a helping hand. Guitarist Jeffery Marshall, drummer Adam Gust and Chown's former Tiles bandmate Chris Herin also contributed on the EP. Another video for the song "Alive" was released only weeks later.

== Allt för Sverige reality television ==
In May 2018, Chown was announced as one of the cast members of Season 8 of the Emmy award-winning Swedish reality show, Allt för Sverige, marketed in the U.S. as The Great Swedish Adventure. The show's 8 episodes aired weekly from September 16 through November 4 on Sweden's national public TV broadcaster, SVT. Chown's feature episode dealing his Swedish family heritage and their 19th century emigration to North America aired on October 21; Chown was among the final four contestants to appear in the November 4 season finale.

== Escanaba business activities ==
Chown was instrumental in organizing the inaugural Northern Lights Music Fest, which took place July 21-22, 2023 at the U.P. State Fairgrounds in his hometown of Escanaba, MI. Chown also performed live with both Sebastian Bach and Steelheart. Country-music superstar Keith Urban headlined the second night.

== Death ==
Chown died from bladder cancer at his home on July 6, 2026, at the age of 56.

== Select discography ==
Kevin Chown

- Kevin Chown (2018)
- Light the Way (EP 2013)
- Freudian Slip (Legato, 1996)

with Bleeding Harp

- Truth (Red Rover, 2018)

with Cosmosquad

- The Morbid Tango (Marmaduke, 2017)

with Der Elefant

- Der Elefant (EP, self-released, 2016)

with Paul Gilbert

- PG-30 Live at Zepp Tokyo 2016 (CD/DVD, Wowow Ent., 2017)
- I Can Destroy (WHD Ent./earMusic, 2015)

with Tarja

- Frisson Noir (earMusic/Edel, 2026)
- In the Raw (earMusic/Edel, 2019)
- Act II (earMusic/Edel, 2018)
- The Shadow Self (earMusic/Edel, 2016)
- The Brightest Void (earMusic/Edel, 2016)
- Colours in the Dark (earMusic/Edel, 2013)
- Act I: Live in Rosario (earMusic/Edel, 2012)

with Chad Smith's Bombastic Meatbats

- Live Meat and Potatoes (Marmaduke/Bickee, 2012)
- More Meat (Warrior, 2010)
- Meet the Meatbats (Warrior, 2009)

with JKB

- Bleeding the Soul (Marmaduke, 2004)

with John West

- Earth Maker (Frontiers, 2002)

with Mike Terrana

- Man of the World (Lion Music, 2005)
- Shadows of the Past (Hotwire, 1999)

with Magnitude 9

- Reality in Focus (InsideOut, 1998)
- Chaos to Control (InsideOut, 1998)

with The Original Moon

- Graffiti (GRP, 1998)

with Tony MacAlpine

- Live in L.A. (VHS, Metropolis, 1997)
- Violent Machine (Metropolis, 1996)

with Artension

- New Discovery (Marquee, 2003)
- Sacred Pathways (Marquee, 2002)
- Phoenix Rising (Shrapnel, 1997)
- Into the Eye of the Storm (Shrapnel, 1996)

with Jeff Kollman

- Into the Unknown (Legato/Bandai, 1996)

with Tiles

- Tiles (Dream Circle, 1994)

with Edwin Dare

- My Time to Die (Marmaduke/Teichiku, 1997)
- Cantbreakme (Marmaduke/Teichiku, 1995)
- The Unthinkable Deed (Marmaduke/Teichiku, 1993)

Other appearances

- Thomas Lang – ProgPop (Muso Entertainment, 2019)
- Tiles – Pretending 2 Run (Laser's Edge, 2016)
- Jeff Kollman – Silence in the Corridor (Marmaduke, 2013)
- Jeff Kollman Band – Empower ... Devour !!! (Marmaduke, 2010)
- Cosmosquad – Acid Test (Marmaduke/Big M.F., 2007)
- Jeff Kollman – Live at the Baked Potato (Marmaduke, 2007)
- $ign of 4 – Dancing with St. Peter (Track Record, 2002)
- Jeff Kollman – Shedding Skin (Marmaduke/Big M.F., 1999)
- Tiles – Presents of Mind (InsideOut, 1998)
- Tiles – Fence the Clear (InsideOut, 1997)
- George Bellas – Turn of the Millennium (Shrapnel, 1997)
