= The Brightest Void =

EP by Tarja
- Released: 3 June 2016
- Recorded: 2015–2016
- Genres: Symphonic rock; symphonic metal
- Label: earMUSIC
- Producer: Tarja

Tarja chronology
Ave Maria – En Plein Air (2015)	The Brightest Void (2016)	The Shadow Self (2016)

Singles from The Brightest Void
- 1. "An Empty Dream" Released: June 23, 2017

Professional ratings
Review scores
Source	Rating
Music Storm Media	8/10 stars
Distorted Sound	8/10 stars

The Brightest Void is the third EP by the Finnish singer Tarja Turunen. It serves as a prequel to the main album The Shadow Self. It was released on the 3 June 2016 and contains 9 tracks.

== Background ==
This album came to Tarja as an idea for a big surprise and gift to her fans containing material recorded but not being included on the main album. She explained: "During the long process of recording the songs for my new studio album ‘The Shadow Self’, I realised that there were so many tracks... ...for just one album. So this time I decided to keep nothing for myself and to share all my favourite new songs with you, the fans, who have shown such passionate and constant support."

On 14 April 2016, earMUSIC released a trailer for the video, "No Bitter End". The whole video was released on 20 April.

On 27 May 2016, Tarja announced the full-length album was available for streaming on Apple Music.

== Track listing ==
No.	Title	Writer(s)	Length
1.	"No Bitter End" (Video Clip Version)	Tarja Turunen; Mattias Lindblom; Alexander Scholpp; Daniel Pieper	3:49
2.	"Your Heaven and Your Hell" (feat. Michael Monroe)	Turunen; Michael Monroe; Julian Barrett	5:34
3.	"Eagle Eye" (feat. Toni Turunen, with Chad Smith on drums)	Turunen; Pauli Rantasalmi	5:01
4.	"An Empty Dream" (Main Theme from "Corazón Muerto")	Turunen; Miguel Ricardo Borzi; Mariano Cattaneo	5:02
5.	"Witch-Hunt"	Turunen	5:16
6.	"Shameless"	Turunen; Barrett	3:42
7.	"House of Wax" (Paul McCartney cover)	Paul McCartney	5:50
8.	"Goldfinger" (James Bond Main Theme, Shirley Bassey cover)	John Barry; Leslie Bricusse; Anthony Newley	4:15
9.	"Paradise (What About Us?) (new mix)" (feat. Within Temptation)	Martijn Spierenburg; Sharon den Adel; Robert Westerholt	5:18

Japanese Edition
No.	Title	Writer(s)	Length
10.	"Into The Sun"	Turunen; Steve Van Velvet; Lindbolm; Anders Wollbeck	6:10

== Personnel ==
=== Musicians ===
- Tarja Turunen - vocals
- Julian Barrett - guitar
- Peter Barrett - bass
- Kevin Chown - bass
- Luis Conte - percussion
- Mike Coolen - drums
- Guillermo De Medio - keyboards
- Sharon den Adel - vocals on track 9
- Jim Dooley
- Stefan Helleblad - guitars on track 9
- Bart Hendrickson
- Ruud Jolie - guitars on track 9
- Izumi Kawakatsu
- Christian Kretschmar
- Max Lilja - cello
- Michael Monroe - vocals on track 2
- Mervi Myllyoja Archived 21 June 2016 at the Wayback Machine - violin
- Atli Örvarsson
- Tim Palmer - Mixing
- Nico Polo - drums
- Fernando Scarcella - drums
- Alex Scholpp - guitar
- Chad Smith - drums on track 3
- Martijn Spierenburg - keyboards on track 9
- Torsten Stenzel
- Mike Terrana - drums
- Toni Turunen - vocals on track 3
- Jeroen van Veen - bass guitar on track 9
- Mel Wesson
- Robert Westerholt - guitars on track 9
- Doug Wimbish
- Anders Wollbeck

== Charts ==
Chart (2016)	Peak position
Austrian Albums (Ö3 Austria)	55
Belgian Albums (Ultratop Flanders)	113
Belgian Albums (Ultratop Wallonia)	80
Czech Albums (ČNS IFPI)	11
Finnish Albums (Suomen virallinen lista)	25
French Albums (SNEP)	99
German Albums (Offizielle Top 100)	41
Swiss Albums (Schweizer Hitparade)	35
UK Rock and Metal Albums (BPI)	7
