= Frisson Noir =

Studio album by Tarja
- Released: 12 June 2026
- Recorded: 2025–2026
- Studios: Stardust III (Marbella); Finnvox (Helsinki); Sterling Sound (New York City); Mimix (Espoo); Opera Eiffel Art Studio (Budapest); ToneHills (Espoo); Delta (Bigastro); PompaRoom; Grindstone (Ipswich)
- Genre: Symphonic metal
- Length: 63:15
- Label: earMUSIC
- Producers: Neal Avron; Tarja Turunen

Tarja chronology
Circus Life (2025)	Frisson Noir (2026)

Singles from Frisson Noir
- 1. "At Sea" Released: 18 March 2026; 2. "I Don't Care" Released: 22 April 2026; 3. "The Trace Outlives" Released: 27 May 2026; 4. "Tango" Released: 15 October 2026

Frisson Noir is the tenth studio album and sixth heavy metal album by the Finnish singer Tarja Turunen, released on 12 June 2026 by earMUSIC. The album has been described by Turunen as being the "heaviest record of her career", being described as her return to the metal genre. Frisson Noir marks the longest gap between metal albums for Turunen, with her last metal album In the Raw being released in 2019. The album's first single, "At Sea", was released on 18 March 2026. A second single, "I Don't Care", featuring Dani Filth was released on 22 April 2026. The third single, "The Trace Outlives", featuring Sayo Komada, was released on 27 May 2026.

The album includes collaborations with former Nightwish bassist Marko Hietala, Apocalyptica, Cradle of Filth vocalist Dani Filth, and Red Hot Chili Peppers drummer Chad Smith. The album also features several guest musicians, including shamisen player Sayo Komada. The album was produced by Turunen and mixed by producer Neal Avron. To promote the album, Turunen will be embarking on the Frisson Live tour, starting in Berlin, Germany.

== Background ==
Turunen has discussed working on new material as early as late 2022, where she states that she is writing music for a new album. In December of 2023, Turunen stated that she was still working on the album and hoped to complete it in 2024. In another 2024 interview, she stated that she was hoping to do another duet for her new album with former Nightwish bandmate Marko Hietala, after the release of their song "Left on Mars" for Hietala's album Roses from the Deep. In late 2025, Turunen began recording vocals for the album, and later began posting on social media about the album's recording process.

On 18 March 2026, Turunen announced the official title of the album, Frisson Noir, set to release on 12 June 2026. Turunen described the album's concept as being centered around the word "frisson". Turunen described the album's concept as the following:

The word frisson describes the moment when music sends a shiver through the body. It is the instant when sound stops being just sound and becomes emotion, memory, and physical sensation. Frisson Noir was created around this idea. In an era where technology can generate songs instantly, the album celebrates the human element in music: real performances, breath, imperfection, uncontrolled emotion, and the unpredictable spark that turns a song into an experience. Every song on the album was written, recorded, produced, and mixed with that intention. From the first note to the final orchestral swell, the music is designed to trigger that unmistakable sensation, the moment when sound becomes something you don’t just hear but feel: to give the listener chills.

— Tarja Turunen, earMUSIC

== Composition and promotion ==
The album, at the time of its announcement, was described in a press release as "the heaviest record of her career and a powerful statement of identity, strength and belonging". Three singles were released ahead of the album's release date to promote the album. The first single, "At Sea", featuring guest musicians Mervi Myllyoja and Niklas Pokki, was released at the same time as the album's release announcement. The song, running just over ten minutes long, makes it Turunen's longest song in her solo catalogue. Turunen describes the track as a complex "Frankenstein" with huge orchestration and many tempo changes. When asked about the song's meaning, Turunen stated it is about "uncertainty or facing uncertainty with fear but determination". Turunen described the writing process as being done "through silence, doubt, breath, and risk, chasing a feeling until it gives us goosebumps".

The second single, "I Don't Care", featuring Cradle of Filth vocalist Dani Filth, was released on 22 April 2026. The song was described by Turunen as a "fierce declaration of independence" that "rejects imposed expectations and confronts the illusions society creates around morality, belief and success". Musically, it was described as being a song with "intense symphonic elements and heavy, modern metal power while being dramatic and unapologetically dark".

The third and final single, "The Trace Outlives", featuring Japanese shamisen player Sayo Komada, was released on 27 May 2026. The song was heavily inspired by the Japanese phenomenon "johatsu". The song "explores the emotional space between presence and absence, pondering what remains when someone decides to disappear—not just for themselves, but also for those left behind." On her collaboration with Sayo Komada on the track, Turunen stated "I was looking for a sound that would take me to Japan and found a beautiful ancient instrument that resembles a guitar, but has a more percussive sound – the shamisen, traditionally used in puppet theaters [...] I invited the young talent Sayo Komada to blend her art with my song."

According to Turunen, the third track on the album, "The Eternal Return", was written with guitarist Alex Scholpp, and features an excerpt from “Le cygne” by Camille Saint-Saëns. The fourth track, "Leap of Faith", featuring former Nightwish bassist Marko Hietala, is the only track on the album that was written with the intention of being a duet, and is about Turunen and Hietala's "past, present, and future". The sixth track, "Blaze Forever", is about a person's inner voice, fighting your own battle, and moving forward with your desires and dreams. The eighth track, "Tango", featuring Finnish symphonic metal band Apocalyptica, is about people passing away without leaving a legacy behind. The ninth track, "Anemoia", is about "nostalgia for a time you’ve never experienced" and Turunen's experience living in Spain. The eleventh and final track, "Against the Odds", featuring Red Hot Chili Peppers drummer Chad Smith, was recorded during the Shadow Self sessions before the album came to fruition. It is about Turunen's experience growing up in Kitee, Finland and pursuing music "against the odds". The song was featured as the intro track for the second part of Turunen's 2016 live recording Act II.

== Critical reception ==
Professional ratings
Review scores
Source	Rating
Blabbermouth.net	8/10 stars
Chaoszine	5/5 stars
Cryptic Rock	4/5 stars
Metalfan	8.2/10 stars
Metal Hammer	8/10 stars
Out of Rage	9/10 stars
Rock Hard	8/10 stars

Frisson Noir received positive reviews from critics. Hector Sanchez of Chaoszine gave the album 5/5, describing the album as having "clear artistic maturity", and that it showcases Turunen's "most determined effort to define her signature sound". Dannii Leivers of Metal Hammer gave the album 8/10, calling it a return to her heavy roots and "the biggest and strongest collection of solo songs she’s ever recorded". Leivers cited "Leap Of Faith" with Marko Hietala as one of the album's standout tracks, calling it reminiscent of their previous work together in Nightwish. Blabbermouth.net also gave the album 8/10, praising the heaviness of the album and its collaborators, while citing "At Sea" to be the "pinnacle of her solo career to date". Jens Peters of Rock Hard praised the album, calling it a "solid album that symphonic metal fans are sure to enjoy".

== Track listing ==
All tracks written by Tarja Turunen unless otherwise stated.

No.	Title	Writer(s)	Length
1.	"Intro"		0:45
2.	"Frisson Noir"	Turunen; Bart Hendrickson	6:35
3.	"The Eternal Return"	Turunen; Alex Scholpp	4:51
4.	"Leap of Faith" (featuring Marko Hietala)		6:53
5.	"At Sea" (featuring Mervi Myllyoja and Niklas Pokki)		10:18
6.	"Blaze Forever"		6:31
7.	"The Trace Outlives" (featuring Sayo Komada)	Turunen; Scholpp; Guillermo de Medio	5:00
8.	"Tango" (featuring Apocalyptica)	Turunen; Medio	4:46
9.	"Anemoia" (featuring Julián Bedmar and Valter Freitas)		5:18
10.	"I Don't Care" (featuring Dani Filth)		5:26
11.	"Against the Odds" (featuring Chad Smith)	Turunen; Jim Dooley	6:27
12.	"Outro"		1:05
Total length:			63:15

== Personnel ==
All information from the album booklet and the official Frisson Noir website.

Band & featured musicians

- Tarja Turunen – vocals, songwriting, piano (tracks 3, 6, 9, 11)
- Marko Hietala – vocals and bass guitar on "Leap of Faith"
- Dani Filth – vocals on "I Don't Care"
- Niklas Pokki – grand piano on "At Sea"
- Mervi Myllyoja – violin on "At Sea"
- Sayo Komada – shamisen on "The Trace Outlives"
- Apocalyptica – cello on "Tango"
- Julián Bedmar – flamenco guitar on "Anemoia"
- Valter Freitas – cello (track 9, 11)
- Chad Smith – drums on "Against the Odds"
- Alex Menichini – drums (tracks 2, 3, 5, 7, 10)
- Fernando Scarcella – drums (tracks 4, 6, 8, 9)
- Alex Scholpp – guitar (tracks 3, 4, 7, 10, 11), bass (tracks 3, 10), songwriting (tracks 3, 7)
- Julian Barrett – guitar (tracks 2, 5, 6, 8)
- Guillermo de Medio – keyboard (tracks 4, 6, 8, 9), guitar on "Tango", songwriting (tracks 7, 8), arrangements (choir) on "Leap of Faith"
- Roland Boeffgen – keyboard on "I Don't Care"
- Christian Sasmi-Kretschmar – keyboard, piano, cello on "The Eternal Return"
- Bart Hendrickson – keyboard on "Frisson Noir"
- Doug Wimbish – bass (tracks 2, 6, 9)
- Peter Barrett – bass (tracks 5, 7, 8)
- Kevin Chown – bass on "Against the Odds"

Additional musicians

- Jeremy Levy – orchestrations
- Jim Dooley – arrangements (orchestra and choir) (tracks 5, 7, 11), songwriting on "Against the Odds"
- Bart Hendrickson – arrangements (orchestra and choir) on "Frisson Noir"
- Budapest Art Orchestra – orchestra
- Budapest Art Choir – choir
- Gyorgy Gulyas Nagy – conducting

Budapest Art Orchestra

- Rodrigo Puskas (concertmaster), Anna Frenyo, Balazs Sima, Barbara Juharos, Dora Maros, Eva Toth, Ferenc Puss, Gabriella Urmosi, Katalin Telbisz, Maria Ziesemer, Melinda Bobak, Peter Sarosi, Jozsef Racz (leader), Ananda Fukuda, Bernadett Szegleti, Borbala Pomozi, Brigitta Mako, Elemer Korenyi, Eva Stafka, Fanni Rac, Laszlo Farkas, Roberta Kiss-Varga, Veronika Lugosi, Viktoria Szilvasi, Agnes Apro (leader), Andras Rudolf, Antal Molnar, Attila Kovacs, Eniko Balogh, Katalin Bognar-Juhasz, Monika Bodi, Orsolya Tokes, Zoltan Onczay (leader), Mariann Pleszkan, Monika Andrasi, Piroska Molnar, Rita Vadasz, Sandor Harangozo, Tunde Lukacs, Zsuzsanna Smidelik, Ivan Sztankov (leader), Gabor Nahaj, Gyorgy Sandor, Tibor Tabanyi

Budapest Art Choir

- Panna Pejtsik (choir leader), Adam Kurucz, Agnes Pinter, Ambrus Racz, Anna Vamos, Balazs Porcsalmy, Balazs Somogyi, Boglarka Pejtsik, Gyorgy Sillo, Janos Fatrai, Julia Polgar, Katinka Kemeny, Krisztian Kuthi, Marta Stefanik, Melanie Utasi, Orsolya Ambrus, Pal Sebestyen, Peter Balas, Peter Kalla-Lukacs, Petra Tasnadi, Tamas Matin, Tunde Szarvas, Viktor Papp, Zsofia Nemeth, Zsuzsanna Bojta

Production

- Tarja Turunen – producer, art direction
- Marcelo Cabuli – producer, art direction
- Guillermo de Medio – co-producer (tracks 5, 7, 8)
- Julian Barrett – co-producer (tracks 2, 6)
- Jim Dooley – co-producer (tracks 4, 7)
- Alex Scholpp – co-producer on "I Don't Care"
- Roland Boeffgen – co-producer on "I Don't Care"
- Neal Avron – mixing
- Scott Skrzynski – co-mixing
- Ted Jensen – mastering
- David Lukacs – audio engineering
- Gabor Buczko – recording engineer
- Miklos Lukacs – contractor & session producer
- Jesús Gómez "Trikel" – recording (Tarja's vocals)
- Juan Ballester – recording (Marko's bass)
- Erkka Korhonen – recording (Marko's vocals)
- Jyri Sariola – recording (Mervi's violin)
- Valtteri Tuominen – recording (Niklas's piano)
- Scott Atkins – recording (Dani's vocals)
- Katariina Souri – painting
- Dirk Rudolph – artwork
- Evara Collin – make-up, hair
- Tim Tronckoe – photography

== Charts ==
Chart performance for Frisson Noir
Chart (2026)	Peak position
Austrian Albums (Ö3 Austria)	21
Belgian Albums (Ultratop Wallonia)	95
Finnish Albums (Suomen virallinen lista)	14
French Albums (SNEP)	184
French Rock & Metal Albums (SNEP)	11
German Albums (Offizielle Top 100)	12
German Rock & Metal Albums (Offizielle Top 100)	7
Polish Albums (ZPAV)	29
Scottish Albums (Official Charts)	32
Swedish Hard Rock Albums (Sverigetopplistan)	8
Swedish Physical Albums (Sverigetopplistan)	6
Swiss Albums (Schweizer Hitparade)	14
UK Albums Sales (OCC)	25
UK Independent Albums (Official Charts)	10
UK Rock & Metal Albums (Official Charts)	6
UK Independent Album Breakers Charts (Official Charts)	1
