= The Other Side (Farmer Boys album) =

Studio album by Farmer Boys
- Released: 2004
- Studio: E.L.C.H. Studio
- Genre: Alternative metal, groove metal, gothic metal
- Label: Nuclear Blast Records
- Producer: Farmer Boys

Farmer Boys chronology
The World Is Ours (2000)	The Other Side (2004)	Born Again (2018)

The Other Side is the fourth full-length album by the German metal band Farmer Boys. Unlike their previous albums, this album has no reference to farm animals or farm life at all. A music video for "Stay Like This Forever" was made and it was released on the Monsters of Metal Vol. 2 DVD.

== Track listing ==
All music is composed by Matthias Sayer, Alex Scholpp, Dennis Hummel.

No.	Title	Lyrics	Length
1.	"For the World to Sing"	Sayer, Jeff Collier	4:28
2.	"Like Jesus Wept"	Sayer	3:58
3.	"Once and for All"	Scholpp	4:31
4.	"Where the Sun Never Shines"	Sayer, Collier	5:33
5.	"Premonition"	Sayer, Collier	0:57
6.	"In My Darkest Hour"	Sayer	4:08
7.	"Stay Like This Forever"	Sayer, Collier	3:39
8.	"The Other Side"	Sayer, Collier	3:33
9.	"What a Feeling Like"	Sayer, Collier	4:27
10.	"Trail of Tears"	Sayer, Collier	3:27
11.	"Home Is Where the Stars Are"	Sayer, Collier	4:56
12.	"Get Crucified"	Sayer, Collier	2:51

Special edition
No.	Title	Length
13.	"Requiem"	1:24
14.	"The Day We Died"	4:58
15.	"Immortal"	6:36

== Personnel ==
=== Farmer Boys ===
- Matthias Sayer – vocals
- Alexander Scholpp – guitars
- Dennis Hummel – programming
- Antonio Ieva – bass
- Till Hartmann – drums

=== Production ===
- Bernhard Hahn – engineer
- Dan Diamond – mix producer, mixing
- Siggi Bemm – mix engineer, mastering
- Dennis Köhne – mix engineer

== Charts ==
2004 weekly chart performance for The Other Side
Chart (2004)	Peak position
German Albums (Offizielle Top 100)	70
