= Morphosis (disambiguation) =

Morphosis Architects are an interdisciplinary architectural and design practice based in Los Angeles and New York City.

Morphosis may also refer to:

== Biology ==
- Anamorphosis (biology)
- Epimorphosis
- Heteromorphosis
- Metamorphosis

== Music ==
- Morphosis (Hate album), 2008
- Morphosis (Max Lilja album), 2015
- Morphosis, an album by Ming Bridges
- Morphosis, an album by Boris Carloff
- "Morphosis", a song by Drottnar from Anamorphosis

== Other uses ==
- Morphosis (wrestler) (born 1969), Mexican professional wrestler

== See also ==
- Morphoses, a ballet production company
- MorphoSys, a German biopharmaceutical company
