= An Empty Dream =

An Empty Dream

- An Empty Dream (1922 film), List of Chinese films before 1930
- An Empty Dream (ko), 1965 Korean remake of the Japanese film Daydream (1964 film)
- An Empty Dream (song), a song by Tarja Turunen
