= The World Is Ours =

The World Is Ours may refer to:

- The World Is Ours (Farmer Boys album), 2000
- The World Is Ours (Upon a Burning Body album), 2010
- The World Is Ours (film), a 1937 Czech film directed by Martin Frič
- Coca-Cola's theme song for the 2014 FIFA World Cup by David Correy featuring Monobloco
