= Dark Christmas (Tarja album) =

Studio album by Tarja
- Released: 10 November 2023
- Genres: Christmas; classical
- Length: 51:56
- Label: earMUSIC
- Producers: Tarja; Jim Dooley; Tim Palmer

Tarja chronology
Best of: Living the Dream (2022)	Dark Christmas (2023)	Frisson Noir (2026)

Singles from Dark Christmas
- 1. "Frosty the Snowman" Released: 31 October 2023; 2. "Jingle Bells" Released: 3 November 2023; 3. "All I Want For Christmas Is You" Released: 8 December 2023

Professional ratings
Review scores
Source	Rating
Kaaoszine	4.5/5 stars
Metal Rules	3.5/5 stars

Dark Christmas is the third classical and Christmas album, and the ninth studio album released by the Finnish singer Tarja Turunen. It is the long-awaited sequel to her second Christmas album, From Spirits and Ghosts (Score for a Dark Christmas). The music was arranged and orchestrated by Tarja's frequent collaborators Jim Dooley and Tim Palmer.

The album is the first to include a special children's choir in each song, with the choir also including Turunen's daughter, Naomi. Naomi also plays the drums on some songs.

The album was announced to be specially mixed with immersive Dolby Atmos mixing, and it was announced that there would be pre-listening sessions in cinemas worldwide of the album. Each song was also announced to be receiving its own music video.

== Background ==
The album includes eleven popular Christmas songs, such as "O Holy Night", "All I Want for Christmas is You", and "Rudolph the Red-Nosed Reindeer", as well as an originally composed Christmas song by Tarja entitled "Dark Christmas", which take a dark and gothic twist on the famous classics. Like From Spirits and Ghosts (Score for a Dark Christmas), it utilizes grand orchestras combined with Tarja's soprano vocals to create a beautiful atmosphere. The album was specially created for those who have lost the happiness of Christmas, as well as those who want to embrace the holiday spirit while exploring a more mysterious side of Christmas.

The album was first teased on Tarja's social media on 23 October 2023, and the first single, "Frosty the Snowman", was released on 31 October 2023. The second single, "Jingle Bells", was released on 3 November 2023. The third single, "All I Want For Christmas Is You", was released on 8 December 2023, a month after the album had already released.

== Track listing ==
Dark Christmas track listing
No.	Title	Writer(s)	Length
1.	"The First Noel"		3:18
2.	"Frosty the Snowman"	Walter E. "Jack" Rollins; Steve Nelson	3:07
3.	"O Holy Night"	Adolphe Adam	4:29
4.	"Dark Christmas"	Tarja Turunen	4:35
5.	"Jingle Bell Rock"	Joseph Carleton Beal; James Ross Boothe	3:52
6.	"White Christmas"	Irving Berlin	3:43
7.	"All I Want for Christmas is You"	Mariah Carey; Walter Afanasieff	5:18
8.	"Wonderful Christmastime"	Paul McCartney	5:31
9.	"Last Christmas"	George Michael	4:30
10.	"Jingle Bells"	James Lord Pierpont	4:33
11.	"Rudolph the Red-Nosed Reindeer"	Johnny Marks	4:19
12.	"Angels We Have Heard On High"		4:41
Total length:			51:56

== Personnel ==
- Tarja Turunen – lead vocals, piano
- Jim Dooley – keyboards and orchestral and choral arrangements
- Julián Barret – guitars
- Mervi Myllyoja – violin
- Ida Elina – kantele
- Naomi Cabuli Turunen – drums

== Charts ==
Chart performance for Dark Christmas
Chart (2023)	Peak position
Austrian Albums (Ö3 Austria)	59
Finnish Albums (Suomen virallinen lista)	9
German Albums (Offizielle Top 100)	39
UK Album Downloads (Official Charts)	91
UK Independent Albums (Official Charts)	42
UK Progressive Albums (Official Charts)	15
UK Rock & Metal Albums (Official Charts)	15
