= Plays Electronica By One Cello =

Plays Electronica by One Cello is the first solo album by the Finnish cellist and composer Max Lilja. The 10 track album was self-released by the artist on 12 April 2013. According to the artist: "An album of electronic cello music created by using cello as the only sound source." A music video with images of paintings by a Finnish artist Antti Rönkä was released for the opening track "I Sound My Sound".

Track list:

- I Sound My Sound
- Now
- A State Of Mind
- Count Phase
- Like This
- It Is In
- The End
- You Me
- Qualified
- In SoS
