= Artension =

American metal band

- Origin: United States of America
- Genres: Progressive metal, neoclassical metal
- Years active: 1993–2005, 2016–present
- Labels: Lion Music, Shrapnel, Marquee/Avalon
- Members: Roger Staffelbach; John West; Chris Caffery
- Past members: Vitalij Kuprij; Mike Terrana; Kevin Chown; John Onder; Shane Gaalaas; Steve Di Giorgio

Artension is a North American neoclassical progressive metal band, founded in 1993 by keyboardist Vitalij Kuprij. The band split up after recording seven albums from 1996 to 2004, but reformed in 2016 with the intention of releasing an eighth album.

== History ==
It was sometime in 1992 or 1993 when Vitalij Kuprij, who was studying classical music in Switzerland at that time, met Roger Staffelbach, a Swiss guitarist who was also studying at the Jazz School in Lucerne.

They soon founded their band "Atlantis Rising", which played several instrumental gigs in Switzerland. After having recorded some demos, they got in touch with Mike Varney of Shrapnel Records, who showed great interest in the band but suggested to add some vocal lines to their songs.

Vitalij knew drummer Mike Terrana from one of Yngwie Malmsteen's tours and, along with his friend and bassist Kevin Chown, the quartet formed Artension.

Mike Varney introduced Vitalij and Roger to several musicians, one of them being John West, whose soaring vocals, along with Vitalij's and Roger's lightning-fast solos, became the trademark for Artension's neo-classical and aggressive music.

== Line-up ==
=== Current members ===
- Roger Staffelbach – guitar (1993–2005, 2016–present)
- John West – vocals (1996–2005, 2016–present)
- Chris Caffery – guitar (2016–present)

=== Former members ===
- Vitalij Kuprij – keyboard (1993–2005, 2016–2024; his death)
- Mike Terrana – drums (1996–1998, 2001–2005)
- Kevin Chown – bass (1996–1998, 2001–2004; died 2026)
- John Onder – bass (1999–2000)
- Shane Gaalaas – drums (1999–2000)
- Steve Di Giorgio – bass (2004–2005)

== Discography ==
- Into the Eye of the Storm (1996)
- Phoenix Rising (1997)
- Forces of Nature (1999)
- Machine (2000)
- Sacred Pathways (2001)
- New Discovery (2002)
- Future World (2004)
