= Ave Maria – En Plein Air =

Studio album by Tarja
- Released: 11 September 2015
- Recorded: 21–23 November 2011
- Venue: Lakeuden Risti Church, Seinäjoki, Finland
- Genre: Classical
- Length: 45:34 (48:21 with bonus track)
- Label: earMUSIC
- Producer: Tarja & Mic

Tarja chronology
Luna Park Ride (2015)	Ave Maria – En Plein Air (2015)	The Brightest Void (2016)

Ave Maria – En Plein Air is the first classical, and the fifth studio album released by the Finnish singer Tarja Turunen.

On the 22 July 2015, earMUSIC released a video announcing the existence of the album, following with a teaser trailer on 6 August. The full music video was not released until 13 August that year, with Tarja singing the rare "Ave Maria" by Paolo Tosti.

== Background ==
In an interview with Winter Storm Slovakia, Tarja talked a little about the recording sessions :

"All the musicians performed the songs together with me without an audience" and continues saying "Nothing has been edited nor any studio tricks have been used" and finishes with "So what you hear on the record, is purely how the songs sounded in Lakeuden Risti church during the recording session."

She also says that this is a very important album to her, since "It represents her long background in classical music and her knowledge as a lyrical singer".

== Track listing ==
Ave Maria – En Plein Air
No.	Title	Writer(s)	Length
1.	"Ave Maria"	Paolo Tosti	3:51
2.	"Ave Maria"	Axel von Kothen	3:00
3.	"Ave Maria"	David Popper	3:45
4.	"Ave Maria"	Camille Saint-Saëns	4:27
5.	"Ave Maria"	Astor Piazzolla	5:13
6.	"Ave Maria"	J. S. Bach / Charles Gounod	2:46
7.	"Ave Maria"	Pietro Mascagni	3:29
8.	"Ave Maria"	Ferenc Farkas	2:16
9.	"Ave Maria"	Vladimir Vavilov	4:12
10.	"Ave Maria"	Michael Hoppé	3:21
11.	"Ave Maria"	Charles-Marie Widor	3:28
12.	"Ave Maria"	Tarja Turunen	5:11

iTunes bonus track
No.	Title	Writer(s)	Length
13.	"Ave Maria Stella" (i.e. Ave maris stella)	Edvard Grieg	2:47

=== Musicians ===
- Tarja Turunen – soprano
- Kalevi Kiviniemi – organ
- Marius Järvi – cello
- Kirsi Kiviharju – harp

== Chart performance ==
Chart (2015)	Peak position
Belgian Albums (Ultratop Flanders)	165
Belgian Albums (Ultratop Wallonia)	159
Finnish Albums (Suomen virallinen lista)	31
