= From Spirits and Ghosts (Score for a Dark Christmas) =

Studio album by Tarja
- Released: 17 November 2017
- Recorded: Summer 2017 in Caribbean
- Genre: Christmas; classical
- Label: earMUSIC
- Producer: Tarja, Jim Dooley, Tim Palmer

Tarja chronology
The Shadow Self (2016)	From Spirits and Ghosts (Score for a Dark Christmas) (2017)	Act II (2018)

Singles from From Spirits and Ghosts (Score for a Dark Christmas)
- 1. "O Come, O Come, Emmanuel" Released: 6 October 2017; 2. "O Tannenbaum" Released: 27 October 2017; 3. "Feliz Navidad" Released: 1 December 2017

Professional ratings
Review scores
Source	Rating
AllMusic	4/5 stars

Graphic novel cover art

From Spirits and Ghosts (Score for a Dark Christmas) is the second classical and Christmas album, and the seventh studio album released by the Finnish singer Tarja Turunen. The music was arranged and orchestrated by Tarja's frequent collaborator Jim Dooley.

On the 22 September 2017, earMUSIC released a video announcing the existence of the album. A music video was released on the 6th of October, with Tarja singing "O Come, O Come, Emmanuel".

With the album release comes also Tarja Turunen's first graphic novel, From Spirits and Ghosts (Novel for a Dark Christmas). The 40-page novel is about the world of dark Christmas scripted by Peter Rogers with accompanying art by Conor Boyle. The "novel for a dark Christmas" revolves around Tarja's two characters, the dark and light one, bringing together lonely souls during the festive season.

The album has been critically acclaimed by critics and fans alike, who have noted the dark twist Turunen achieved on the album and the combination of different languages.

The album was re-released on November 6, 2020, the reissue includes 3 versions in alternative languages plus the collaboration with Tarja's friends Cristina Scabbia, Doro Pesch, Elize Ryd, Floor Jansen, Hansi Kürsch, Joe Lynn Turner, Marko Saaresto, Michael Monroe, Sharon den Adel, Simone Simons, Timo Kotipelto and Tony Kakko for the beloved "Feliz Navidad". Further to the additional studio recordings, the reissue comes with the previously unreleased live album "Christmas Together: Live at Olomouc and Hradec Králové 2019". A sequel album, Dark Christmas, was released on November 10, 2023.

== Background ==
The album includes 11 Christmas classics combined with darker gothic influences. Utilizing the sound of a grand orchestra, traditional songs such as "O Tannenbaum", "We Wish You a Merry Christmas" and "Feliz Navidad" are included. Besides covering classic carols, "From Spirits and Ghosts" also features a 12th track, the original track "Together". This song continues the dark sound of the album and embodies the theme of ghosts and mysticism throughout.

On December 8, Tarja released a second, "charity" version of "Feliz Navidad" as a way to help raise funds for Barbuda, an island that was severely damaged by Hurricane Irma. The track features guest vocals by Doro Pesch, Michael Monroe, Tony Kakko (Sonata Arctica), Elize Ryd (Amaranthe), Marko Saaresto (Poets of the Fall), Timo Kotipelto (Stratovarius), Simone Simons (Epica), Cristina Scabbia (Lacuna Coil), Joe Lynn Turner (Rainbow, Deep Purple), Floor Jansen (Nightwish), Hansi Kürsch (Blind Guardian) and Sharon Den Adel (Within Temptation).

== Track listing ==
From Spirits and Ghosts (Score for a Dark Christmas)
No.	Title	Writer(s)	Length
1.	"O Come, O Come, Emmanuel"	John Mason Neale	4:56
2.	"Together"	Tarja Turunen	3:21
3.	"We Three Kings"	John Henry Hopkins Jr.	3:54
4.	"Deck the Halls" (featuring Naomi Cabuli Turunen)	Thomas Oliphant; John Thomas; Talhaiarn	2:44
5.	"Pie Jesu"	Andrew Lloyd Webber	3:28
6.	"Amazing Grace"	John Newton	4:42
7.	"O Tannenbaum"	Ernst Anschütz; Melchior Franck	3:37
8.	"Have Yourself a Merry Little Christmas"	Hugh Martin; Ralph Blane	3:40
9.	"God Rest Ye Merry Gentlemen"		4:13
10.	"Feliz Navidad"	José Feliciano	5:48
11.	"What Child Is This"	William Chatterton Dix	4:55
12.	"We Wish You a Merry Christmas"		4:07
Total length:			49:25

From Spirits and Ghosts (Score for a Dark Christmas) 2020 Edition (bonus tracks)
No.	Title	Length
13.	"Sublime Gracia"	4:44
14.	"Ô viens, Ô viens, Emmanuel"	4:59
15.	"O Christmas Tree"	3:39
16.	"Feliz Navidad (Barbuda Relief and Recovery Charity Version)"	6:36
Total length:		62:47

== Musicians ==
- Tarja Turunen – vocals, keyboard & piano
- Naomi Eerika Alexia Cabuli Turunen – lead vocals on Deck the Halls
- Peter Gregson – cello
- Jim Dooley (James) – keyboard, piano, orchestral and choir arrangements

== Charts ==
Chart (2017)	Peak position
Austrian Albums (Ö3 Austria)	50
Czech Albums (ČNS IFPI)	30
Finnish Albums (Suomen virallinen lista)	32
German Albums (Offizielle Top 100)	40
UK Independent Albums (Official Charts)	7
US Top Classical Albums (Billboard)	12
