= At Sea (song) =

Single by Tarja Turunen

from the album Frisson Noir
- Released: 18 March 2026
- Studio: Stardust III; Finnvox Studios; Mimix Studios; Opera Eiffel Art Studio
- Genre: Symphonic metal
- Length: 10:18
- Label: earMUSIC
- Songwriter: Tarja Turunen
- Producers: Tarja Turunen; Mic; Guillermo De Medio; Neal Avron

Tarja Turunen singles chronology
"Dark Christmas" (2025)	"At Sea" (2026)	"I Don't Care" (2026)

"At Sea" is a song by Finnish heavy metal singer Tarja, and is the lead single of Tarja's tenth studio album and sixth metal album Frisson Noir. The single was released digitally on 18 March 2026, the same day that Frisson Noir was announced to the public.

== Background and composition ==
"At Sea" was written by Tarja, Mic, and Guillermo De Medio, and features guest musicians Mervi Myllyoja and Niklas Pokki. The song was produced by Turunen and mixed by producer Neal Avron. The song is Turunen's longest song in her solo catalogue at ten minutes and eighteen seconds. When asked about the song, Turunen described the song as a "Frankenstein" with huge orchestration and multiple tempo changes. When asked about the song's meaning, Turunen said that it is about "uncertainty or facing uncertainty with fear but determination". Turunen described the writing process as being done "through silence, doubt, breath, and risk, chasing a feeling until it gives us goosebumps".

== Track listing ==
Single release
No.	Title	Writer(s)	Length
1.	"At Sea"	Tarja Turunen	10:18

== Personnel ==
Band & featured musicians

- Tarja Turunen – lead vocals, backing vocals
- Alex Menichini – drums
- Julian Barrett – guitar
- Pit Barrett – bass
- Niklas Pokki – grand piano
- Mervi Myllyoja – violin

Additional musicians

- Jim Dooley – orchestral & choir arrangements, programming
- Jeremy Levy – orchestrations & music preparations
- Budapest Art Orchestra – orchestra
- Budapest Art Choir – choir
- Gyorgy Gulyas Nagy – orchestra conductor

Production

- Tarja Turunen, Mic – production
- Guillermo De Medio – co-production
- Neal Avron – mixing
- Scott Skrzynski – co-mixing
- Ted Jensen – mastering
- David Lukacs – audio engineering
- Gabor Buczko – recording engineer
- Miklos Lukacs – contractor & session producer
- Ferenc Vass – photographer
