= Farmer Boys (band) =

German metal band

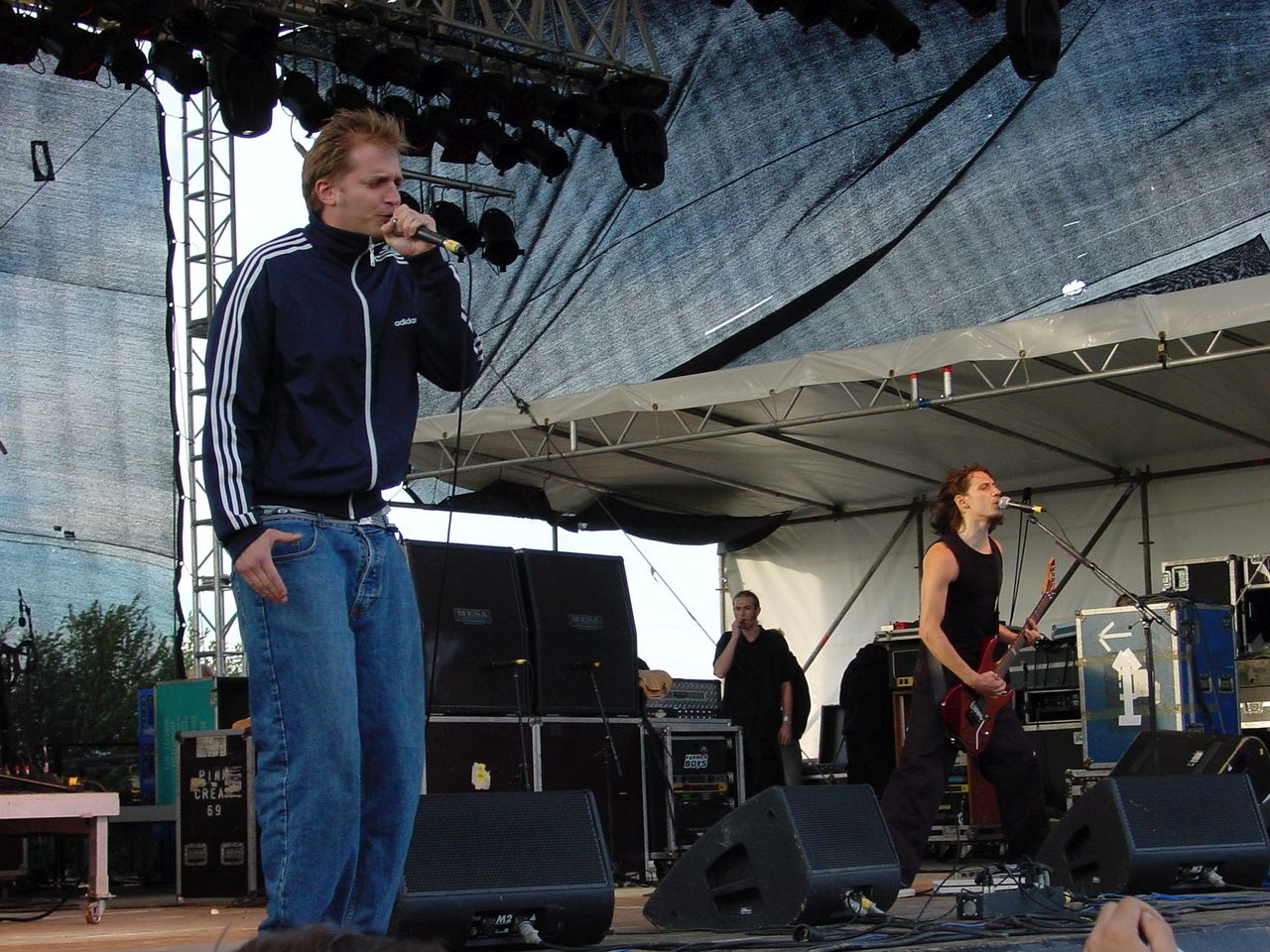
- The band in 2003

Background information
- Origin: Stuttgart, Germany
- Genres: Alternative metal, groove metal, gothic metal
- Years active: 1994–present
- Labels: BMG, Motor Music, Nuclear Blast
- Members: Matthias Sayer; Alexander Scholpp; Richard Duee; Ralf Botzenhart; Timm Schreiner
- Past members: Antonio Ieva; Denis Hummel; Till Hartmann
- Website: farmerboysmusic.com

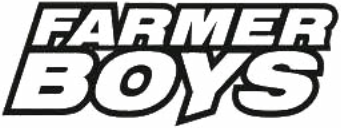
The band's logo

Farmer Boys is a German metal band from Stuttgart.

== History ==
In 1996, Farmer Boys released their debut album Countrified. All of the album's songs make reference to farm life or farm animals. It also has a cover track of Depeche Mode's "Never Let Me Down Again". The album is the band's heaviest album ever recorded and it strongly features elements from thrash metal, groove metal and gothic metal. Music videos for "Farm Sweet Farm" and "Never Let Me Down Again" were directed by Nick Lyon. Countrified sold over 10,000 copies.

They reached their peak popularity with their album The World Is Ours, released in 2000; the videos for singles "Here Comes the Pain" and "If You Ever Leave Me Standing" were put into heavy rotation by German alternative music channels such as VIVA Zwei. Farmer Boys has obtained a cult following in later years.

Matthias Sayer also provided guest vocals for Apocalyptica's single "Hope Vol. 2".

Four years after the release of The Other Side, in 2004, the group performed a reunion concert in Stuttgart on 22 December. Aside from their appearance at the 2011 Summer Breeze Open Air on 20 August in Dinkelsbühl, Germany, the band remained relatively silent and inactive.

At the end of 2016, guitarist Alexander Scholpp announced the return of the band, with three shows scheduled in Germany for the spring of 2017, as well announcing the band's plans for a new album. The album, named Born Again, was released in 2018.

== Musical style ==
Farmer Boys' musical style is a blend of Machine Head's groove metal and Paradise Lost's gothic metal; their lyrical matter on the first two albums, however, unusually to the style, revolved around the darker side of agriculture – bestiality and incest ("Farm Sweet Farm"), torture of animals ("When a Chicken Cries for Love"), suicide ("Relieve the Tension") and slaughterhouses ("When Pigs Fly").

== Members ==
- Matthias Sayer – vocals
- Alexander Scholpp – guitars
- Richard Duee – keyboards
- Timm Schreiner – drums
- Ralf Botzenhart – bass (–1999, 2014–)

=== Former members ===
- Antonio Ieva – bass (1999–2014)
- Dennis Hummel – keyboards
- Till Hartmann – drums

== Discography ==
=== Albums ===
Year	Title	Position
Year	Title	GER
1996	Countrified	—
1997	Till the Cows Come Home	—
2000	The World Is Ours	27
2004	The Other Side	70
2018	Born Again	58

=== Singles ===
- Farmer Boys (cardboard promo single) (1995)
- Farm Sweet Farm (1996)
- Never Let Me Down Again (Depeche Mode cover; featuring Anneke van Giersbergen) (1996)
- Till The Cows Come Home (1997)
- When Pigs Fly (1997)
- If You Ever Leave Me Standing (2000)
- Here Comes the Pain (2000)
- While God Was Sleeping (promotional single) (2001)
- Stay Like This Forever (2004)
- You and Me (2017)
- Revolt (2018)
- Tears of Joy (2018)
- Isle of the Dead (2020)

=== Music videos ===
- Farm Sweet Farm
- Never Let Me Down Again
- When Pigs Fly
- Here Comes the Pain
- If You Ever Leave Me Standing
- While God Was Sleeping
- Stay Like This Forever
- You and Me
- Revolt
- Isle of Dead (Acoustic)
