= Underneath (Tarja song) =

Single by Tarja

from the album What Lies Beneath
- Released: 22 April 2011
- Length: 13:55
- Label: Universal Music
- Songwriters: Tarja Turunen; Johnny Andrews

Tarja singles chronology
"Until My Last Breath" (2010)	"Underneath" (2011)	"Into The Sun" (2012)

"Underneath" is the fourth single by Finnish singer Tarja Turunen from her third album What Lies Beneath. It was released on 22 April 2011 only as a digital version. The release has been confirmed for Austria, Switzerland, Russia, Poland, Finland, Sweden, Ukraine, France and UK. It includes two unreleased versions of the song, plus a non-album track in Spanish. An exclusive limited edition 7 inches 2 track vinyl single was released in America on May 24, 2013.

== Track listing ==
1. "Underneath" (Radio Mix) – 4:28
2. "Underneath" (Orchestral Mix) – 5:01
3. "Montañas De Silencio" – 4:26
