= Hevein (band) =

Finnish thrash metal band

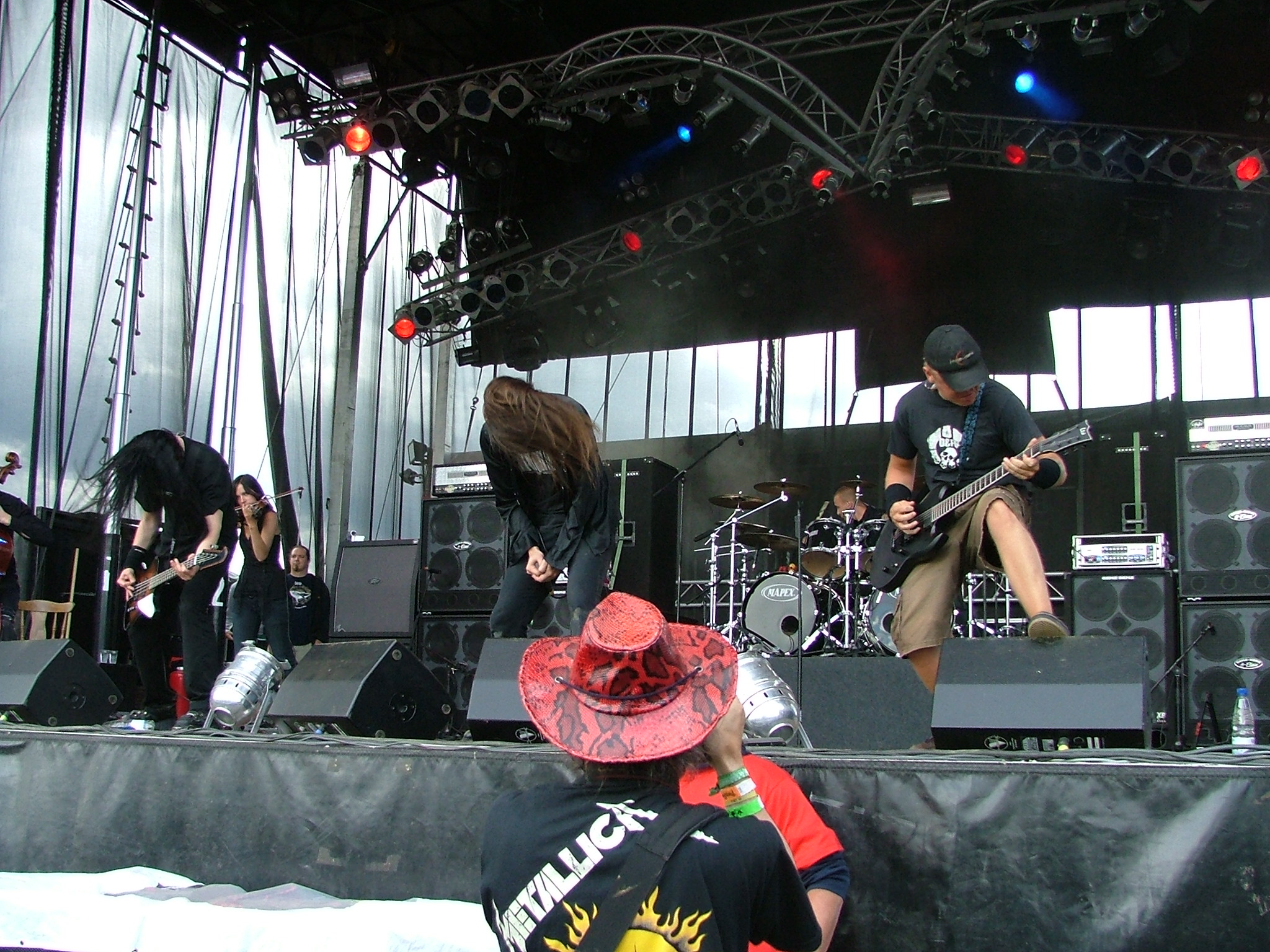
- Hevein live at Summer Breeze Festival 2007

Background information
- Origin: Helsinki, Finland
- Genres: Thrash metal, symphonic metal, neo-classical metal, progressive rock, progressive metal
- Years active: 1992–2012
- Labels: Unsigned
- Members: Juha Immonen; Leif Hedstrom; Aino Piipari; Max Lilja; Janne Jaakkola; Toni Paananen
- Website: www.hevein.com

Hevein was a Finnish thrash metal band from Helsinki with symphonic metal and neo-classical metal influences.

== History ==
Hevein's roots go back to 1992 when guitarist Leif Hedstrom and former drummer Alpo Oksaharju started jamming together. In 1998, bassist Tomi Koivunen and violinist Aino Piipari joined the band. In 2002, cellist Max Lilja left Apocalyptica and joined Hevein. In 2003, Hevein officially started their career when vocalist Juha Immonen joined the band.

=== Debut album Sound Over Matter ===
In 2005, Hevein signed to Finnish indie label Spinefarm Records and released their debut album, Sound Over Matter. The album received a worldwide release via Universal Records and Candlelight Records in the USA.

Hevein's tour of the album was limited to a few shows in Finland, Russia, the Netherlands, Belgium, Germany and a small tour in the Czech Republic.

Hevein released two singles and one music video that they wrote and directed themselves and the album mainly generated positive feedback from music critics.

=== Unfinished album Gentle Anarchy ===
Soon after Hevein released their debut album they set to work on writing new material for their second album Gentle Anarchy. From 2006 to 2008 the band wrote and demoed a plethora of music that did not suit the label they were signed to. In 2008, Hevein parted ways with Spinefarm Records and decided to continue writing and demoing material. With over 40 songs written and no interest from any label, Hevein decided to finance the recording of four songs for the album. On 8 January 2012, after producing a few more demos they released four new songs as a digital download via their Bandcamp website. The revenue generated from the sale of the songs enabled them to record drums for five more songs. However, due to support drying up on their Bandcamp site, the global recession and the state of the music industry, Hevein decided to disband in September 2012 before they could finish the album.

== Name ==
According to Leif Hedstrom, the guitarist once heard a Hüsker Dü song, covered by Blackstar, titled "The Girl Who Lives on Heaven Hill". Hereupon, the words "Heaven Hill" were changed into "Heven Hill" and were altered again until the name "Hevein" was born. Hevein is also a Finnish word play for "the heavy-est" (in reference to heavy metal).

== Members ==
- Juha Immonen – vocals
- Leif Hedstrom – guitar, vocals
- Janne Jaakkola – bass
- Toni Paananen – drums
- Aino Piipari – violin
- Max Lilja – cello

== Former members ==
- Dimitri Paile – vocals
- Tomi Koivunen – bass
- Alpo Oksaharju – drums
- Otto Uotila – drums

== Discography ==
=== Studio albums ===
- Sound Over Matter (2005)

=== Singles, EPs and digital releases ===
- iOta (2005)
- As Far As The Eye Can See (2005)
- Gentle Anarchy EP (digital release; 2010)

=== Demos ===
- Heartland (1999)
- Reverence (2001)
- Only Human (2002)
- Fear Is... Only Human (2003)
- Break Out The Hammers EP (2004)

=== Covers ===
- Pantera's "Walk", featured on the "As Far As the Eye Can See" single
- Anathema's "Empty", which they played live a few times
- Pantera's "Use My Third Arm", played live at Metal Barbecue concert and a Dimebag Darrell memorial concert
- At the Gates, "Cold"

=== Music videos ===
- "Last Drop of Innocence" (2005)
- "New Hope" (2010)
- "Nor" (2011)
