= Eye of the Storm (Tarja song) =

Single by Tarja Turunen

from the album Best of: Living the Dream
- Released: 21 October 2022
- Genre: Symphonic metal; alternative metal
- Length: 5:19
- Label: earMUSIC
- Songwriters: Tarja; Anders Wollbeck; Mattias Lindblom
- Producer: Tarja

Tarja Turunen singles chronology
"Have Yourself a Merry Little Christmas" (2020)	"Eye of the Storm" (2022)	"Numb" (2023)

"Eye of the Storm" is a song by Finnish heavy metal singer Tarja, and is the first single of Tarja's first compilation album Best of: Living the Dream. The single version was released digitally on 21 October 2022, while the full version was released with the release of Best of: Living the Dream on 2 December 2022.

The song was originally written for Tarja's third metal album, Colours in the Dark, however, it was cut from the album and wasn't released until 2022.

== Background ==
The song "Eye of the Storm" was written and composed by Tarja, Anders Wollbeck, and Mattias Lindblom. It was originally written for Tarja's album Colours in the Dark, but was later scrapped. In 2022, it was announced to be the first single released for Tarja's upcoming compilation album, Best of: Living the Dream. Tarja stated about the song:

It was the right time to finally release this song. It has a very deep feeling of closure in it. It’s been influenced by two very important countries in my life: Finland and Argentina. It’s an internal battle inside of me. Because at that time in life, I was really searching for my place in this world, where I belong as a person, as an individual.

== Track listing ==
Single release
No.	Title	Writer(s)	Length
1.	"Eye of the Storm" (Single Version)	Tarja, Anders Wollbeck, Mattias Lindblom	5:19

Album version on Best of: Living the Dream
No.	Title	Writer(s)	Length
1.	"Eye of the Storm"	Tarja, Anders Wollbeck, Mattias Lindblom	6:05

== Personnel ==
Band

- Tarja Turunen – keyboards, lead vocals, backing vocals
- Doug Wimbish – bass
- Fernando Scarcella – drums
- Julian Barrett – electric guitar
- Carlos Corrales - bandoneon
- Jim Dooley - orchestral arrangements

Production

- Marcelo Cabuli – executive producer
- Tim Palmer – mixing
- Tim Tronckoe – photography
