= Demons in You =

Single by Tarja Turunen

from the album The Shadow Self
- Released: 8 October 2016
- Length: 4:44
- Label: earMUSIC
- Songwriters: Tarja; Julian Barrett; Erik Nyholm; Alex Jonson; Christel Sundberg
- Producer: Tarja

Tarja Turunen singles chronology
"No Bitter End" (2016)	"Demons in You" (2016)	"An Empty Dream" (2017)

"Demons in You" is a song by Finnish rock singer Tarja featuring Canadian singer Alissa White-Gluz, for the former's sixth studio album The Shadow Self. It was released as the third and final single from the album. The digital version of the single was released on 8 October 2016, the physical version was released on 14 November 2016.

== Background ==
The song "Demons in You" was written and composed by Tarja, Julian Barrett, Erik Nyholm, Alex Jonson, and Christel Sundberg, and produced by Tarja. The aggressive sound of the song comes from the need for Tarja to insert an extremely energetic track in her album. The text of the song tells of the demons and the darkness that lie within people. The album version features Alissa White-Gluz, the Arch Enemy frontwoman who sings in both growling and clean voice, and Chad Smith, the Red Hot Chili Peppers drummer. The single also contains two additional versions of the song, one sung by only Tarja and the other featuring Alissa White-Gluz on lead vocal parts.

== Track listing ==
No.	Title	Length
1.	"Demons in You"	4:44
2.	"Demons in You" (Tarja Solo Version)	4:43
3.	"Demons in You" (Alissa Lead Vox Version)	4:42

== Personnel ==
Band

- Tarja Turunen – keyboards, lead vocals, backing vocals
- Alissa White-Gluz – lead vocals (track 3), backing vocals (track 1)
- Kevin Chown – bass
- Chad Smith – drums
- Julian Barrett – electric guitar

Production

- Alexander Mertsch – artwork
- Marcelo Cabuli – executive producer
- Justin Shturtz – mastering
- Tim Palmer – mixing
- Tim Tronckoe – photography
