= Tiles (band) =

- Origin: Detroit, Michigan, U.S.
- Genre: Progressive rock
- Years active: 1993–present
- Labels: Inside Out Music; Standing Pavement; Magna Carta Records; Laser's Edge

Tiles is an American progressive rock band from Detroit, Michigan, United States. Tiles have released several albums on Inside Out Music and toured internationally since the release of their first album in 1994.

== History ==
Tiles formed in 1993 and released a self-titled album the following year. This album was an international success, gaining notice in Europe and Japan, and the group signed with Inside Out Music, releasing a second album, Fence the Clear, in 1997. Following the release of their third album, Presents of Mind, in 1999, the group toured Europe as the opening act for Dream Theater. Window Dressing, the band's fourth album, followed in 2004, and the 2008 release Fly Paper included guitar work by Rush's Alex Lifeson. The band's first live album, Off the Floor 01, was released in 2012. Off the Floor 02 was released June 3, 2014 in a limited edition format which includes a bonus disc from the band's 2005 appearance at the Rites of Spring Festival. Tiles' sixth studio album, Pretending 2 Run, was released on April 15, 2016, through Laser's Edge, featuring performances by Mike Portnoy and Ian Anderson, among others.

=== Tiles ===
Tiles released their first album in 1994, a self-titled 47 minute album under the Dream Circle label. It is the first and only album with guest bassist Kevin Chown.

=== Fence the Clear ===
In 1997 they released their second album Fence The Clear. The album marked the first album with current bassist Jeff Whittle. Like their first album, it sounded similar to very early 1990s Rush.

Both albums are noted for being melodic and extensive in structure. Fence the Clear is a slight departure from their first album in terms of heaviness but remains with that hard edge and gap of musical interludes between songs. Both albums were re-released by Inside Out Music with a remastered sound and liner notes detailing each song and what they meant before and during recording.

=== Presents of Mind ===
In 1999, they released their third album Presents of Mind. The album gained them increased recognition and still shows excellent musicianship as first displayed on their debut CD. The album features a few instrumental pieces between songs, carrying on the theme from their previous album. During a tour through Europe (opening for Dream Theater), they released a live bootleg album the following year entitled Presence In Europe, featuring songs from their first three albums. Presents of Mind also began an ongoing collaboration with Hugh Syme producing their album cover art.

=== 2004-2008 ===
Tiles would not release another album until 2004, when they issued their fourth album Window Dressing. The album features their longest song ever recorded, clocking in at 17:11 minutes long while the album ran to one hour and 7 minutes long.

Continuing with lengthy gaps between releases, they did not release their fifth album until 2008. Titled Fly Paper, this album has only 8 songs (plus one hidden bonus track), but still reaches 53 minutes long. Fly Paper features Alex Lifeson of Rush on one song.

=== Inactivity ===
Since their fifth album, Tiles has played just live shows without recording any new material. In 2012, they released their first proper live album, Off The Floor 01, which clocks in at over 77 minutes. A second installment titled Off the Floor 02 was released in 2014. It contains "live studio versions" of some of their earlier songs. These are full-band, one-take recordings rather than the typical multi-track studio cuts found on non-live albums. Also included on the follow-up are some tracks recorded live at 2005's Rites of Spring Festival.

=== 2016 - present ===
2016 saw the release of the most ambitious Tiles project yet, Pretending 2 Run. This was both a concept and double album, and featured appearances by Mike Portnoy, Ian Anderson, Adam Holzman, Colin Edwin, Max Portnoy, Mike Stern, and others. In addition, the band continued its long association with Terry Brown and Hugh Syme. The band continues to perform live in 2017. On January 19, 2018, the band announced that while commemorating their 25th anniversary as a band, singer Paul Rarick would be retiring from the band after their tour in April.

== Members ==
- Mark Evans – drums (1993–1997, 2005–present)
- Chris Herin – guitar, keyboards, mandolin, banjo
- Paul Rarick – vocals
- Jeff Whittle – bass

=== Former ===
- Kevin Chown - bass (1994)
- Pat De Leon – drums (1997–2005)

== Discography ==
- Tiles (Standing Pavement, 1994)
- Tiles re-issue (Polydor, 1995)
- Fence the Clear (Inside Out Music, 1997)
- Presents of Mind (Inside Out Music, 1999 Europe)
- Presents of Mind (Magna Carta Records, 1999 North America)
- Tiles Limited Edition (Inside Out Music, 2004)
- Fence the Clear Limited Edition (Inside Out Music, 2004)
- Presents of Mind Limited Edition (Inside Out Music, 2004)
- Window Dressing (Inside Out Music, 2004)
- Fly Paper (Inside Out Music, 2008)
- Pretending 2 Run (Laser's Edge, April 15, 2016)

=== Live ===
- Presence In Europe 1999: Board Tape/Live Bootleg Collection (2000)
- Off The Floor 01 Live Album (Standing Pavement, 2012)
- Off The Floor 02 Live Album (Standing Pavement, 2014)
