= Till the Cows Come Home =

Till The Cows Come Home

Studio album by Farmer Boys
- Released: 1997
- Genre: Alternative metal, groove metal, gothic metal, industrial metal, nu metal
- Label: Absorbing Recordings, Motor Music

Farmer Boys chronology
Countrified (1996)	Till The Cows Come Home (1997)	The World Is Ours (2000)

Till The Cows Come Home is the second full-length album by the German metal band Farmer Boys. The album has fewer songs referring to farm life or farm animals than their debut album, Countrified, and had more of a nu metal sound. A music video for "When Pigs Fly" was made which features the band playing the song and later hanging upside-down from meat hooks.

== Track listing ==
1. Prized – 3:50
2. When Pigs Fly – 4:05
3. Barnburner – 3:36
4. Boar – 2:56
5. Pig Nick – 3:51
6. Till the Cows Come Home – 4:18
7. Pain Is Party – 2:48
8. Sunburnt – 3:29
9. A Dream with a Dream – 3:37
10. Murder Me – 5:04
11. High to Die – 5:35
