= Morphosis (Max Lilja album) =

2015 album by Max Lilja

Morphosis is the second solo album by the Finnish cellist and composer Max Lilja. The 9 track album was released by Fluttery Records on 10 April 2015. According to the artist: "I got the vision for this 2nd solo album at the mixing stage of the 1st album, quite different from the first in all areas, sound, songwriting and execution. Still all cello and I wrote all the songs to this album on cello" A music video directed and visually designed by the film maker Janne Laiho was released for the opening track Revelation.

== Track list ==
- Revelation
- Silent Highway
- Flux
- Morphosis
- Black Lava
- Unstoppable
- Machinery
- Lonely Blue
- Trench
