= An Empty Dream (song) =

Single by Tarja Turunen

from the album The Brightest Void
- Released: 23 June 2017
- Length: 5:02
- Label: earMUSIC
- Songwriters: Mariano Cattaneo, Miguel Ricardo Borzi, Tarja Turunen
- Producer: Tarja Turunen

Tarja Turunen singles chronology
"Demons in You" (2016)	"An Empty Dream" (2017)	"O Come, O Come, Emmanuel" (2017)

Music video
- "An Empty Dream" on YouTube

"An Empty Dream" is a song by the Finnish soprano Tarja Turunen, taken as the first single from her EP The Brightest Void, even though it was originally a part of the soundtrack of the 2015 Argentinian horror film Corazón Muerto directed by Mariano Cattaneo. The song was released in a digital format on June 23, 2017, more than a year after the release of The Brightest Void.

== Recording locations ==
The song was recorded at Estudio El Pie, Argentina; Stardust II, Antigua & Barbuda; Sardust, Finland; Genelec Artist Room, Finland; and several other locations in the world.

== Video ==
On the day of the release of the single, the music video of the song was released on the YouTube channel of the earMUSIC. The videoclip was filmed in Buenos Aires, in the same location where the film Corazon Muerto was shot (an old abandoned factory), and features the participation of the main actress of the film, Ariadna Asturzzi. The video alternates pieces taken from the film and scenes shot from scratch in which Tarja and Ariadna Asturzzi act together.

== Track listing ==
"An Empty Dream" single track listing
No.	Title	Writer(s)	Length
1.	"An Empty Dream"	Mariano Cattaneo, Miguel Ricardo Borzi, Tarja Turunen	5:02
2.	"Undertaker"	Atli Örvarsson, Mattias Lindblom, Tarja Turunen	4:49
3.	"House of Wax" (live at the Genelec Artist Room)	Paul McCartney	6:41
4.	"An Empty Dream" (movie version)	Mariano Cattaneo, Miguel Ricardo Borzi, Tarja Turunen	3:30
5.	"The Living End" (live at the Genelec Artist Room)	Johnny Andrews, Tarja Turunen	4:00
