= Pretending 2 Run =

Pretending 2 Run.jpg

Studio album by Tiles
- Released: April 15, 2016
- Genre: Progressive rock
- Length: 96:29
- Label: Laser's Edge
- Producer: Terry Brown

Tiles chronology
Fly Paper (2008)	Pretending 2 Run.jpg (2016)

Pretending 2 Run is the sixth studio album by American progressive rock band Tiles. It was released on April 15, 2016, through Laser's Edge.

== Track listing ==
Disc One
No.	Title	Lyrics	Music	Length
1.	"Pretending to Run"	Chris Herin	Chris Herin, Jeff Whittle	7:10
2.	"Shelter in Place"	Herin	Herin	3:53
3.	"Stonewall"	Herin	Herin	6:50
4.	"Voir Dire" (instrumental)		Herin, Whittle	4:37
5.	"Drops of Rain"	Herin	Herin	5:02
6.	"Taken by Surprise"	Herin	Herin, Whittle, Mark Evans	11:22
7.	"Refugium" (choral interlude)		Herin	2:55
8.	"Small Fire Burning"	Herin	Herin, Whittle	4:09
Total length:				45:58

Disc Two
No.	Title	Lyrics	Music	Length
1.	"Midwinter"	Herin	Herin, Whittle	4:32
2.	"Weightless"	Herin	Herin, Whittle	9:16
3.	"Friend or Foe"	Herin	Herin	6:16
4.	"Battle Weary"	Herin	Herin	4:33
5.	"Meditatio" (choral interlude)		Herin	1:37
6.	"Other Arrangements" (instrumental)		Adam Holzman	2:17
7.	"The Disappearing Floor"	Herin	Herin, Evans	5:43
8.	"Fait accompli"	Herin	Herin	4:32
9.	"Pretending to Run (reprise 1)"	Herin	Herin	1:40
10.	"Uneasy Truce" (instrumental)		Herin, Whittle	4:19
11.	"Pretending to Run (reprise 2)"	Herin	Herin	1:15
12.	"The View from Here" (instrumental)		Holzman	1:28
13.	"Backsliding"	Herin	Herin	3:03
Total length:				50:31

== Personnel ==
All credits taken from the Pretending 2 Run liner notes.

=== Tiles ===
- Mark Evans – drums and percussion
- Jeff Whittle – bass guitar, fretless bass, keyboards, vocals
- Chris Herin – electric and acoustic guitars, mandolin, banjo, keyboards, trumpet, vocals
- Paul Rarick – lead and backing vocals

=== Guest musicians ===
- Ian Anderson – flute (Midwinter)
- Mike Portnoy – additional drums (Stonewall, Fait Accompli)
- Max Portnoy – additional drums (Fait Accompli)
- Adam Holzman (keyboardist) – keyboards
- Mike Stern – lead guitar (Taken by Surprise, The Disappearing Floor)
- Colin Edwin – programming & loops (Small Fire Burning, Friend or Foe)
- Kim Mitchell – lead guitar (Shelter in Place)
- Kevin Chown – additional bass (Stonewall, Drops of Rain, Friend or Foe, Fait Accompli)

=== Production ===
- Terry Brown – recording, mixing
- Peter J. Moore – mastering
