= Until My Last Breath =

Single by Tarja

from the album What Lies Beneath
- Released: 30 August 2010
- Genre: Heavy metal; symphonic metal
- Label: Universal Music
- Songwriters: Tarja Turunen; Johnny Andrews
- Producers: Tarja Turunen; Mic

Tarja singles chronology
"I Feel Immortal" (2010)	"Until My Last Breath" (2010)	"Underneath" (2011)

Music video
- "Until My Last Breath" on YouTube

"Until My Last Breath" is a song by Finnish singer Tarja, released as a single from her first Universal album What Lies Beneath. The single was released on 30 August 2010.

The edition for Germany, Switzerland, and Austria comes with Tarja's new song, "The Crying Moon", which had been mentioned/discussed even before she finished the My Winter Storm tour.

The International release on iTunes features an exclusive version of "Falling Awake". This has only so far been mentioned on Tarja's blog under samples.

== Music video ==
There are two music videos for the song. The first official music video was shot in Iceland and features Tarja and some scenes of a diver going to the bottom of the sea. While he sees a siren, he comes back to the surface. As such, it is filmed on the same beach and cliffs as the "I Feel Immortal" music video, and also features Tarja wearing the same black and white outfits. Even though it was filmed after "I Feel Immortal", the "Until My Last Breath" music video was released earlier. The second music video of the song is a reference to Michael Jackson's death and the marketing and publishing on it. It starts with Tarja playing in a pub, with only a few people watching, showing how her career has fallen down. Then it is shown on TV that Tarja was found dead. After this, her album starts to be a success and she turns into a rockstar again. It shows how a death can be good to a career, in the last of the ways.

== Track listing ==
=== Germany, Switzerland and Austria edition ===
1. "Until My Last Breath" (single version) – 3:48
2. "Still of the Night" – 6:33
3. "The Crying Moon" – 3:54

=== International edition ===
1. "Until My Last Breath" (single version) – 3:48
2. "If You Believe" (piano version) – 4:13
3. "Falling Awake" (featuring Julian Barrett; iTunes exclusive) – 5:03

== Chart performance ==
Chart	Peak position
Czech Republic Modern Rock Radio	6
