= Falling Awake (song) =

Single by Tarja

from the album What Lies Beneath
- Released: July 19, 2010
- Genre: Symphonic metal
- Length: 4:43
- Label: Universal Music
- Songwriter(s): Tarja Turunen, Johnny Andrews
- Producer(s): Tarja Turunen

Tarja singles chronology
"Enough" (2009)	"Falling Awake" (2010)	"I Feel Immortal" (2010)

Music video
- "Falling Awake" on YouTube

"Falling Awake" a promotional single by Tarja from her third album What Lies Beneath, composed by herself and Johnny Andrews. The single was released worldwide on 19 July by Universal Music, and had a limited release. The song was produced by Tarja, being her first single released produced by herself.

On August 24, it was released on iTunes.

== Content ==
My first street single and very personal song to me. I wrote the song together with singer, songwriter Johnny Andrews. The storyline goes around my life as an artist today. I felt it is time to write something positive, since I truly feel good and confident today. I think this story represents many other people as well, so I have high hopes that listeners can feel connected with it.

— Tarja Turunen, on What Lies Beneath microblog

== Track listing ==
1. "Falling Awake" (Single Version) – 4:43
2. "The Good Die Young" (Tarja Version) – 5:15

== Guests ==
There are three different versions of the song that features a different guitarist for each one. Joe Satriani plays on the album version, Jason Hook of Five Finger Death Punch is featured on the single version, and Julian Barrett appears in the free download version.

== Music video ==
A promotional video was released featuring behind the scenes studio footage of the making of What Lies Beneath.

== Chart performance ==
Chart	Peak position
Czech Republic Radio Modern Rock	18
