= Max Lilja =

Finnish cello player (born 1975)

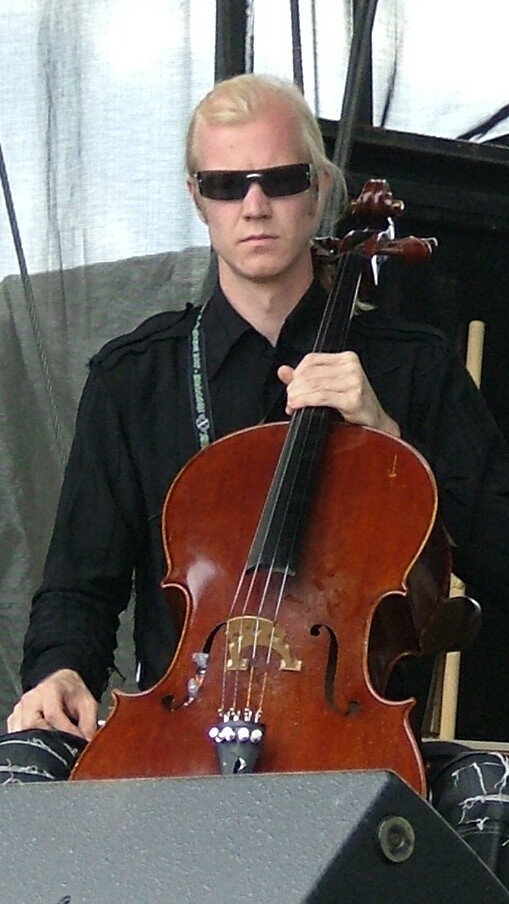
- Lilja in 2007

Background information
- Born: Max Fedi Tapani Lilja; 27 October 1975 (age 50); Vantaa, Finland
- Genres: Electronica, cello rock, symphonic metal
- Occupations: Musician, composer, songwriter
- Instrument: Cello
- Years active: 1996–present
- Website: http://www.maxlilja.com

Max Lilja (born 27 October 1975) is a Finnish cello player. He is best known as a founding member of the Finnish cello metal band Apocalyptica, a band he left in 2001 to join the Finnish thrash metal band Hevein. Beginning in 2007, Lilja had been a recording and touring member of Tarja Turunen's solo band. Throughout his career, Lilja has continued to play classical music alongside rock, metal, and crossover projects.

== Early life and musical training ==
Max Lilja was born in Vantaa, Finland. In 1980, he began playing the violin, but quickly switched to cello at age 7. In 1985, Lilja began his studies in the Junior Academy of Helsinki's prestigious Sibelius Academy, after studying as a practice pupil for the Sibelius Academy cellist Panu Saari. In 1993, he was accepted into the Sibelius Academy's University-level program as a student of Dr. Raimo Sariola and Prof. Arto Noras. It was in this program that he first began to play covers of Metallica songs with the cellists who went on to form Apocalyptica. Lilja did quite well at the Sibelius Academy, earning the principal chair of the academy's Symphony Orchestra in 1995.

== Apocalyptica ==
In 1995, Max Lilja joined the future members of Apocalyptica in their experimentation with playing rock and metal music on the cello, which led to their first gig playing in a rock club. Within a year, Apocalyptica was founded and signed to Finnish indie label Zen Garden, and released their debut album Plays Metallica by Four Cellos in 1996. In 1997, this first album began worldwide sales, and Apocalyptica began touring and performing so frequently that Lilja dropped out of the Sibelius Academy to devote himself full-time to the band. Within the next three years, Lilja recorded two more albums with Apocalyptica, Inquisition Symphony and Cult. In 2001, Lilja toured with Apocalyptica for the last time as a member of the band.

== Hevein and Tarja ==
In 2002, Max Lilja left Apocalyptica and joined Hevein. He appeared on their 2005 debut album Sound Over Matter, released through Spinefarm Records, as well as a couple of earlier demo recordings. Hevein left Spinefarm Records, and financed their own self-released demo in 2012, while looking for a new label. Later that year, Hevein disbanded, promising to regroup if funding to finish their latest album ever materialized. In 2007, Lilja began performing with former Nightwish singer Tarja Turunen, as she launched her solo career. In addition to touring with Tarja, Lilja has appeared on several recordings, including the 2010 album What Lies Beneath.

== Solo albums ==
After more than a decade experimenting with electrified cello, Lilja began writing material for solo electronic cello in 2010. The release of his first solo album, Plays Electronica By One Cello, was in April 2013, followed by his second Morphosis in April 2015 and his third 10,000 Miens in 2018. According to the artist: "electronic cello music created by using cello as the only sound source."

== Discography ==
Solo albums

- 2013: Plays Electronica by One Cello
- 2015: Morphosis
- 2018: 10 000 Miens
- 2020: The Exorcist (Original Radio Play Soundtrack)
- 2024: Six Shades of Bach (PENTATONE)

Unofficial release

- 2013: Max Lilja's Twin Peaks Theme on Cello (original composition by Angelo Badalamenti)

With Apocalyptica

- 1996: Plays Metallica by Four Cellos
- 1998: Inquisition Symphony
- 2000: Cult

With Hevein

- 2005: Sound Over Matter

With Tarja

- 2010: What Lies Beneath
- 2013: Colours in the Dark
- 2016: The Shadow Self
