= In the Raw (Tarja album) =

Studio album by Tarja
- Released: 30 August 2019
- Recorded: 2019
- Genre: Symphonic metal
- Length: 57:18
- Label: earMUSIC
- Producer: Tarja Turunen

Tarja chronology
Act II (2018)	In the Raw (2019)	Best of: Living the Dream (2022)

Singles from In the Raw
- 1. "Dead Promises" Released: 3 May 2019; 2. "Railroads" Released: 21 June 2019; 3. "Tears in Rain" Released: 9 August 2019; 4. "You and I" Released: 13 December 2019

Professional ratings
Review scores
Source	Rating
Metal Hammer (PT)	4/5 stars
Cryptic Rock	5/5 stars
Sonic Perspectives	8.8/10 stars
Metal Imperium	8/10 stars

In the Raw is the eighth solo studio album by the Finnish singer Tarja Turunen. The record was released on 30 August 2019.

== Background ==
On In the Raw, released on August 30, 2019, composer and vocalist Tarja Turunen joined forces with other Heavy Metal vocalists such as Soilwork vocalist Björn "Speed" Strid, Tommy Karevik of Kamelot, and Lacuna Coil's Cristina Scabbia, thus including in the album vocal collaborations with them. Strid is featured in "Dead Promises", Scabbia's vocals can be heard in "Goodbye Stranger", and Karevik is featured in "Silent Masquerade".

On 12 September 2019, Turunen started the "Raw Tour" to promote the In the Raw album. However, many of its shows were postponed due to the COVID-19 pandemic.

== Critical reception ==
In the Raw has been widely acclaimed by both heavy metal fans and music critics in general, as Gary Hernandez from "Metal Temple" wrote: "In the Raw reminds us how good Symphonic Metal can be: Vocal performances executed to perfection, versatile songwriting, thoughtful arrangements, deeply talented musicians, excellent production values".

== Track listing ==
No.	Title	Writer(s)	Length
1.	"Dead Promises" (featuring Björn Strid)	Tarja Turunen; Alex Scholpp	5:50
2.	"Goodbye Stranger" (featuring Cristina Scabbia)	Turunen; Scholpp	5:12
3.	"Tears in Rain"	Turunen; Johnny Lee Andrews	4:28
4.	"Railroads"	Turunen; Erik Nyholm	4:00
5.	"You and I"	Turunen; Michael Zlanabitnig; Mattias Lindblom	4:07
6.	"The Golden Chamber (Awaken - Loputon yö - Alchemy)"	Turunen; Jim Michael Dooley	7:05
7.	"Spirits of the Sea"	Turunen; Bart K Hendrickson	6:56
8.	"Silent Masquerade" (featuring Tommy Karevik)	Turunen; Julian Barrett	7:32
9.	"Serene"	Turunen; Scholpp; Anders Wollbeck; Lindblom	4:42
10.	"Shadow Play"	Turunen	7:22
Total length:			57:18

Extra Raw (Box Set Edition Bonus CD)
No.	Title	Length
1.	"Dead Promises" (Single Version)	5:52
2.	"Spirits of the Sea" (Carlinhos Percussion Mix)	7:00
3.	"Railroads" (Demo)	3:55
4.	"Goodbye Stranger" (Solo Version)	5:11
5.	"You and I" (Band Version)	4:09
6.	"Spirits of the Sea" (Bartly's Water Remix)	7:01
7.	"Silent Masquerade" (Solo Version)	7:32
Total length:		40:40

== Personnel ==
All information from the album booklet.

Tarja

- Tarja Turunen – lead vocals, piano, art director
- Alex Scholpp – guitars, bass, keyboards, vocals, drum programming
- Christian Kretschmar – keyboards
- Kevin Chown – bass

Additional musicians

- Björn Strid – additional vocals
- Cristina Scabbia – additional vocals
- Tommy Karevik – additional vocals
- Tim Palmer – guitars, keyboards, percussion, narration, mixing
- Timm Schreiner – drums
- Julián Barrett – guitars, drum programming, co-producer (tracks 8 and 10), recording
- Bart Hendrickson – keyboards, programming, drum programming, ambient design
- Doug Wimbish – bass
- Peter Barrett – bass
- Anders Wollbeck – keyboards, programming
- Johnny Andrews – keyboards, co-producer (track 3)
- Erik Nyholm – keyboards
- James Dooley – keyboards, programming
- Carlinhos Brown – percussion
- Thiago Pugas – percussion

Production

- Marcelo Cabuli – art direction, recording
- Travis Kennedy – mixing assistant
- Justin Shturtz – mastering
- Max Vaccaro – executive producer
- Anja Obersteller – executive producer
- Isabelle Albrecht – executive producer
- Bernhard Hahn – recording
- Jim Dooley – ambient design

== Charts ==
Chart (2019)	Peak position
Austrian Albums (Ö3 Austria)	30
Belgian Albums (Ultratop Flanders)	66
Belgian Albums (Ultratop Wallonia)	60
Czech Albums (ČNS IFPI)	57
Finnish Albums (Suomen virallinen lista)	28
French Albums (SNEP)	88
German Albums (Offizielle Top 100)	15
Hungarian Albums (MAHASZ)	28
Polish Albums (ZPAV)	37
Scottish Albums (Official Charts)	29
Swiss Albums (Schweizer Hitparade)	12
Spanish Albums (Promusicae)	38
UK Rock and Metal Albums (BPI)	3
UK Independent Albums	7
UK Official Album Sales	22
US Top Heatseeker (Billboard)	7
US Top Hard Rock Albums (Billboard)	12
US Independent Albums (Billboard)	27
US Top Rock Albums (Billboard)	35
