= I Feel Immortal =

- The artwork for the single by Dirk Rudolph.

Single by Tarja ft. Jason Hook

from the album What Lies Beneath
- Released: 27 August 2010
- Genre: Symphonic metal
- Length: 4:28
- Label: Universal Music, Vertigo Berlin 0602527425900
- Songwriters: Toby Gad; Kerli Kõiv; Lindy Robbins; Tarja
- Producers: Mic; Tarja

Tarja ft. Jason Hook singles chronology
"Falling Awake" (2010)	"I Feel Immortal" (2010)	"Until My Last Breath" (2010)

Music video
- "I Feel Immortal" on YouTube

"I Feel Immortal" is a song by Finnish singer-songwriter Tarja, featuring Canadian guitarist Jason Hook. It was written by Tarja, Toby Gad, Kerli Kõiv, and Lindy Robbins, and was produced by Tarja and "Mic". It was released as the second single from her second album What Lies Beneath on 27 August 2010.

A version recorded by Kerli under the title "Immortal" is featured on Frankenweenie Unleashed!, an album consisting of tracks from and inspired by the Tim Burton film Frankenweenie.

== Background ==
The song was originally written by Toby Gad, Kerli, and Lindy Robbins (who wrote Demi Lovato's "Skyscraper" the same day) for Kerli's second album but Kerli stated "it didn't make it on my album so [Tarja] rewrote some things in the verses and took our hook."

== Track listing ==
Regular edition

1. "I Feel Immortal" (Single Mix) - 4:28
2. "I Feel Immortal" (Radio Mix) - 4:31

Limited premium edition

1. "I Feel Immortal" (Single Mix) - 4:28
2. "If You Believe" (Piano Version) - 4:13

== Credits and personnel ==
- Tarja Turunen - vocals, songwriter, producer, backing vocals, piano
- Toby Gad - songwriter
- Kerli Kõiv - songwriter
- Lindy Robbins - songwriter

Credits adapted from What Lies Beneath liner notes.

== Music video ==
The music video was filmed in Iceland and features Tarja interacting with a character who gets older throughout the video. The video, along with the song and single, was a last-minute request from Germany. As such, it is filmed on the same beach and cliffs as the "Until My Last Breath" music video, and also features Tarja wearing the same black and white outfits. Even though it was filmed after "Until My Last Breath", the "I Feel Immortal" music video was released earlier.

== Charts ==
Chart (2010)	Peak position
Germany Singles Charts	55

== Release history ==
Region	Date	Format
Austria	27 August 2010	CD, digipak, digital download
Germany	27 August 2010	CD, digipak, digital download
Switzerland	27 August 2010	CD, digipak, digital download
United Kingdom	1 November 2010	Digital download
