= The World Is Ours (Farmer Boys album) =

Studio album by Farmer Boys
- Released: 2000
- Genre: Alternative metal, groove metal, gothic metal, industrial metal, nu metal
- Label: Motor Music

Farmer Boys chronology
Till the Cows Come Home (1997)	The World Is Ours (2000)	The Other Side (2004)

The World Is Ours is the third studio album by the German metal band Farmer Boys. This album has only one reference to farm life, unlike the numerous references in their two previous albums. The album is their most successful record to date, climbing its way to 27th in the German charts and remaining there for five weeks. The album is more melodious and follows the industrial metal and nu metal sound first explored on their previous album, Till the Cows Come Home. Music videos for "Here Comes the Pain", "While God Was Sleeping" and "If You Ever Leave Me Standing" were made.

== Tracks ==
1. Here Comes the Pain – 4:51
2. The Good Life – 4:29
3. End of All Days – 3:53
4. We Sow the Storm – 4:16
5. If You Ever Leave Me Standing – 4:01
6. A New Breed of Evil – 4:10
7. While God Was Sleeping – 4:42
8. Turn the World to Ice – 4:17
9. Like a Dart in Your Face – 4:41
10. Farm Two Thousand – 4:03
11. The World Is Ours – 4:30

== Charts ==
2000 weekly chart performance for The World Is Ours
Chart (2000)	Peak position
German Albums (Offizielle Top 100)	27
