= The Shadow Self =

Studio album by Tarja
- Released: 5 August 2016
- Recorded: 2015–2016
- Genre: Symphonic metal
- Length: 1:06:03
- Label: earMUSIC
- Producer: Tarja Turunen

Tarja chronology
The Brightest Void (2016)	The Shadow Self (2016)	From Spirits and Ghosts (Score for a Dark Christmas) (2017)

Singles from The Shadow Self
- 1. "Innocence" Released: 5 August 2016; 2. "No Bitter End" Released: 5 August 2016; 3. "Demons in You" Released: 8 October 2016

Professional ratings
Review scores
Source	Rating
Metal Hammer (GER)	5/7 stars
Metal Hammer (UK)	4/5 stars
Metal Injection	3.5/5 stars
Myglobalmind	9/10 stars
Whiplash.net	9/10 stars

The Shadow Self is the sixth studio album released by the Finnish singer Tarja Turunen. The record was released on 5 August 2016. The record produced three singles.

== Background ==
The songwriting started just after the release of Colours in the Dark in 2013, and Tarja gave hints through her Facebook and Twitter accounts along the way. In the start of 2016, Tarja started to reveal more bits about the album and put up bits of lyrics on Facebook. Tarja also stated on her Twitter account that there would be two collaborations with two woman singers on the album.

On 17 October 2015, Tarja performed two new songs, "No Bitter End" and "Goldfinger", a James Bond theme cover, which would be the first glimpses of the new album.

On 14 March 2016, the artwork and album name finally got revealed, Turunen said that the title of The Shadow Self was inspired by Scottish singer Annie Lennox: "I came across an Annie Lennox interview some time ago on the internet, and I was reading about her speaking about 'the shadow self,' about a darker side of us all. Everybody has a darker side, and we should probably just appreciate that it exists, but especially we artists. We get a lot of inspiration from our darker side". On March 22, 2016, Earmusic released a snippet of "No Bitter End" on YouTube.

On 7 April 2016, Earmusic revealed the prequel named The Brightest Void, released on 3 June with nine tracks. It is an album by itself but also ties together with The Shadow Self. On 14 April 2016, Earmusic released a trailer for the coming video "No Bitter End", the whole video will be released on 20 April. On 27 May 2016, Tarja announced that The Brightest Void was available for streaming on Apple Music. The album was once again mixed in Austin, Texas at '62 Studios by Tim Palmer.

The Yin-yang symbol or Taijitu

The Shadow Self was influenced by the Yin-Yang concept. The Brightest Void represents the light and The Shadow Self represents the darkness.

== Track listing ==
No.	Title	Writer(s)	Length
1.	"Innocence"	Tarja Turunen; Anders Wollbeck; Mattias Lindblom	6:03
2.	"Demons in You" (featuring Alissa White-Gluz)	Turunen; Julian Barrett; Erik Nyholm; Alex Jonson; Christel Sundberg	4:44
3.	"No Bitter End"	Turunen; Alex Scholpp; Lindblom; Daniel Pieper	4:26
4.	"Love to Hate"	Turunen; Erik Nyholm; Angela Heldmann	5:57
5.	"Supremacy" (Muse cover)	Matt Bellamy	5:03
6.	"The Living End"	Turunen; Johnny Andrews	4:41
7.	"Diva"	Turunen; Wollbeck; Lindblom	5:45
8.	"Eagle Eye" (featuring Toni Turunen) (album version)	Turunen; Pauli Rantasalmi	4:36
9.	"Undertaker"	Turunen; Atli Örvarsson; Lindblom	6:41
10.	"Calling from the Wild"	Turunen; Scholpp; Lindblom	5:13
11.	"Too Many" (Including hidden track: "This Is a Hit-Song")	Turunen; Guillermo De Medio; Heldmann	7:48 (12:53)
Total length:			01:06:03

Special Edition Bonus DVD
No.	Title	Length
1.	"Interview"	16:55
2.	"No Bitter End" (Official Video Clip)	4:03
3.	"Innocence" (Official Video Clip)	5:29

== Personnel ==
=== Musicians ===
- Tarja Turunen – vocals, piano
- Christian Kretschmar – keyboard
- Kevin Chown – bass
- Max Lilja – cello (cut 3)
- Alex Scholpp – guitar
- Doug Wimbish – bass
- Julian Barrett - guitar
- Peter Barrett - bass

Additional musicians

- Luis Conte – percussion
- Mike Coolen – drums
- Chad Smith – drums (cuts 2,3,11)
- Guillermo De Medio
- Izumi Kawakatsu
- Mervi Myllyoja
- Atli Örvarsson
- Nico Polo - drums
- Fernando Scarcella - drums
- Torsten Stenzel
- Mike Terrana
- Toni Turunen – vocals on "Eagle Eye"
- Alissa White-Gluz – vocals on "Demons in You"
- Anders Wollbeck

=== Production ===
- James Dooley – orchestral and choir arrangements
- Bart Hendrickson – orchestral and choir arrangements
- Mel Wesson - sound designer
- Tim Palmer – mixing

== Charts and sales ==
Chart performance for The Shadow Self
Chart (2016)	Peak position
Austrian Albums (Ö3 Austria)	19
Belgian Albums (Ultratop Flanders)	37
Belgian Albums (Ultratop Wallonia)	39
Czech Albums (ČNS IFPI)	3
Dutch Albums (Album Top 100)	130
Finnish Albums (Suomen virallinen lista)	5
French Albums (SNEP)	71
German Albums (Offizielle Top 100)	7
Spanish Albums (Promusicae)	46
Swiss Albums (Schweizer Hitparade)	11
UK Rock and Metal Albums (BPI)	8
UK Top Independent Albums	13
UK Official Physical Sales	70
UK Albums (BPI)	149
US Top Heatseeker (Billboard)	23

Sales Certifications

Region	Certification
Russia (NFPR)	Gold
