= What Lies Beneath (Tarja album) =

Studio album by Tarja
- Released: 1 September 2010
- Recorded: January 2010, April 2010
- Studio: Petrax Studio, Hollola, Finland; Stardust; La Nave de Osberg Studios, Buenos Aires, Argentina; Slovak Radio Recording Studios, Bratislava, Slovakia
- Genre: Symphonic metal
- Length: 55:23 / 73:00
- Label: Vertigo; Universal; The End Records (US); Avalon (Japan)
- Producer: Marcelo Cabuli

Tarja chronology
The Seer EP (2008)	What Lies Beneath (2010)	Act I: Live in Rosario (2012)

Singles from What Lies Beneath
- 1. "Falling Awake" Released: 19 July 2010; 2. "I Feel Immortal" Released: 27 August 2010; 3. "Until My Last Breath" Released: 30 August 2010; 4. "Underneath" Released: 22 April 2011

What Lies Beneath is the third studio album by the Finnish singer Tarja Turunen, which was released on 1 September 2010 in Finland, on 3 September in Germany, Switzerland and Austria and on 14 September in Latin and North America. It is the first of Tarja's albums in which she is credited for composition on every track. The album was mixed at '62 Studios in Austin Texas by Tim Palmer.

In 2008, after the first leg of the Storm World Tour, Turunen took time to compose new songs. She announced in her blog two songs that she had composed in her time off, "Wisdom of Wind" and "Enough", both later released on the My Winter Storm extended edition. On January 25, Turunen announced on her blog the name of her follow-up to My Winter Storm and talked about the album, revealing titles and lyrics. What Lies Beneath, which sold around 1,300 copies in the United States in its first week of release, landed at position 24 on the Billboard's Top Heatseekers, which lists the best-selling albums by new and developing artists. In Finland, it was at 6th position after two months on the official Finnish charts, also spending two months on the German Top 100, one and a half months on the Austrian Top 40, and a full month on the charts in Switzerland, Belgium and Greece, ending 2010 at 13th position on Billboard's Top 100 of best-selling albums in Europe.

== Background and composition ==
In 2008, after the first leg of the Storm World Tour, Turunen took time to compose new songs. She revealed in her blog two songs that she composed in her time off, "Wisdom Of Wind" and "Enough", both later released on the My Winter Storm Extended edition.

On 25 January, Turunen posted on her blog announcing the name of her follow-up to My Winter Storm and talking about the album:

My friends,

Happy 2009!

In the last months I've been writing a lot of music for my new album.... Song writing is always an amazing learning experience and it has been a pleasure to discuss music with different people. The album process is still going on and I have more songs that are in the working.... With My Winter Storm I chose the name of the album in the early stages and that helped me to create the concept for the album. With the new album I decided to do it the same way, so I searched for an inspiring title and all the songs are one way or another related to it. So I leave you now with the working title of my new album: "What Lies Beneath".

After the break in her tour Tarja returned with the second leg, called "Summer Storm", which started on 5 June, in which she played a new song called "If You Believe", which is meant to be released on What Lies Beneath. In a video interview with Metalhead magazine, on 21 June, Tarja said that it "[...] will be a continuation of the method that I used on my first album, My Winter Storm. It is a very experimental album and has been or is My Winter Storm. But some elements are more worked, for example the guitars in some songs. It's an album [that is] more mature and more personal than the first". In another interview in a Romanian magazine, she stated that the album "is an album more mature, the songs are more "film" and have strong lyrics. People around me affect me, the books of Paulo Coelho, the nature and the mysteries of life. Musically the album is a mixture of metal, soundtrack and classical music. It will be a continuation of the previous one. It will be very experimental." In an interview with a Venezuelan radio on 19 May 2009, Tarja said that she has twenty songs ready to record, and she announced via her official blog that the recording process was finished on 14 April 2010.

== Title and lyrics ==
Speaking to the german magazine Metal.de, Tarja told that the title of "What Lies Beneath" was actually chosen two years before its release. And about it concept, she explained: "stands for the question of what constitutes an artist, what describes me as a person, as a woman. I write about things that sometimes need a second look. As a small person, it is often difficult to understand yourself, understand them. The title can also stand for the question of what is under the water, the sea, for example. I am a passionate diver, I love the underwater world."

That is visible in the fourth song of the album, "In For a Kill", which Tarja explained that is a song about sharks: "people, we think that sharks are hunting us, but really we are hunting sharks. That is the whole concept of that song, how sad it is. The misconception that we have in life in general that we think all the sharks are killers and we need to be afraid of sharks. I saw a documentary called Shark Water. I cried so much after that. It was so awful. You should all see that. It was terrible." "Naiad", one of the bonus tracks of the album, speaks for itself, and before the release of the album, the singer defined her as a "personalisation of beauty". The concept and title of the album was actually born from that character, as Tarja said that she invented a whole history around the nymph and her underwater kingdom. The Naiad's story is also told in another music of What Lies Beneath, the tenth song of the disc, "The Archive of Lost Dreams".

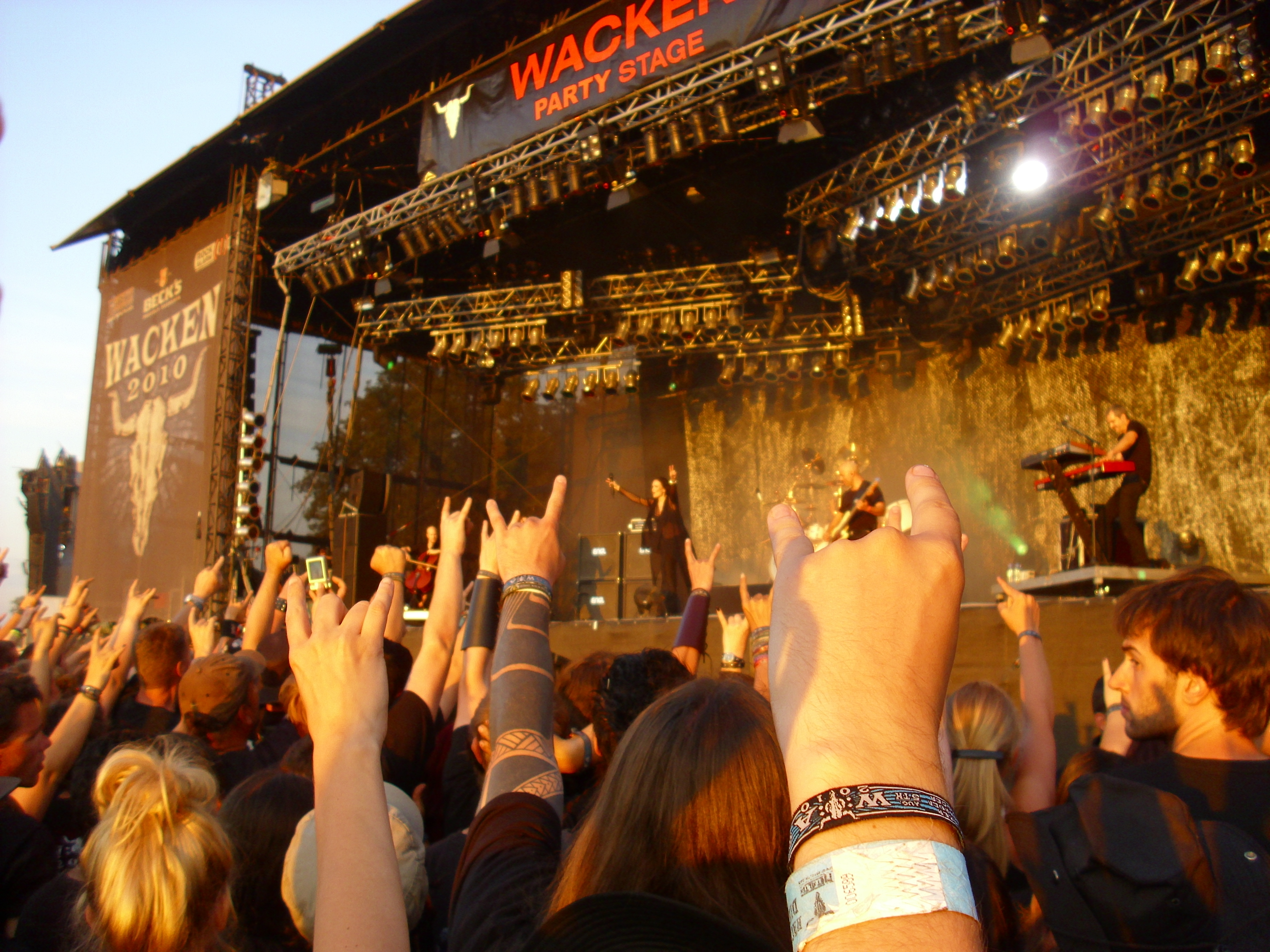
Turunen promoting the album with her support band at the Wacken Open Air, August 6, 2010

Beyond the sea, "Rivers of Lust" it's a song that surrounds the concept of what we can't see in the first look. The seventh track of What Lies Beneath tells the story about a powerful and respectable man that is, in fact, a child abuser, "It’s possible to live with a person for many years and suddenly discover a dark side that you never knew existed.” "Until My Last Breath", the third single from the album, reflects the bad things that surrounded the death of Michael Jackson and how people changed without noticing. And "The Crying Moon", another bonus track of the album, it's, according to Tarja, "about the suffering and pain that the moon witnesses between two people totally in love who cannot be together."

== Promotion ==
To promote the album, Turunen started the What Lies Beneath World Tour on 12 June 2010, which ended on 8 April 2012, in Rio de Janeiro, Brazil. It started with a special concert in Rio de Janeiro, during the big international festival Rock in Rio, on 15 September 2011. In total, the singer performed 118 shows, mostly in Europe and Latin America. Tarja's first live DVD, Act I, was filmed during two nights in Rosario, Argentina, on 30 and 31 March 2012, being released months later, precisely on 24 August 2012.

The album generated four singles. "Falling Awake" was released as the first one, with a music video showing the backstage of the album. "I Feel Immortal" was released after, as the second single. The official video of this track was directed by Jörn Heitmann and filmed in Iceland. According to Tarja, the video it's "about loving someone, losing someone, struggling to find your way in life, the cycle of life" Almost at the same time, "Until My Last Breath" was released as the third and international single of the disc. This was the most successful one from the album, receiving particularly popularity in Brazil. There are 2 music videos for this song. The first official video was shot in Iceland and features Tarja and some scenes of a diver going to the bottom of the sea. The second music video of the song is a reference to Michael Jackson's death and the marketing and publishing on it. The final single, "Underneath", receive only limited digital release, but was performed with Jyrki 69 in the Finnish version of the reality show Idols.

=== Re-issue ===
On April 12, 2024, the album got re-issued for the first time with a 2CD Special Edition and, for the first time, a Heavyweight 2LP Vinyl (Gatefold, 180g, black). Both formats feature restored artwork, and all tracks are remastered at Sterling Sound for superb sound quality. The 2CD Special Edition includes the 14 original album tracks and a special bonus CD including alternative versions, single edits, and remixes – for the first time all combined on this Bonus CD. It also includes "The Good Die Young" performed by the Scorpions & Tarja, originally included as bonus track on 2010's Limited Dreamers Boxset.

On February 23, 2024, Tarja released the special single edit of "Dark Star". The digital single also includes an alternative version of "Dark Star" and the song "Underneath" featuring Jyrki Linnankivi (The 69 Eyes).

== Reception ==
Professional ratings
Review scores
Source	Rating
AllMusic	3.5/5 stars
About.com	3/5 stars
Sputnikmusic	3/5 stars
Metal Storm	7/10 stars

The album was well-received among the critics and the fans; it charted in 18 countries, reaching the Top 20 in seven and the Top 10 in three. The critics generally praised her voice and originality in the album, with a critic of "Reflects of Darkness" saying that "'What Lies Beneath' is fresh, powerful and captivating so that you cannot ignore it. You're either going to love it or hate it. My advice: love it, it's worth it!".

George Pacheco, from About.com, gave the album 3 out of 5 stars, saying that the album presents an "uneven tone" but also praised Tarja's voice, saying, "No one with ears will ever deny that Tarja Turunen can sing." Kyle Ward, from Sputnikmusic webzine, also gave the album 3 stars out of 5, stating that the album is "enjoyable" but far better than her previous album, as he says that "the songs on What Lies Beneath are a stark contrast to the disjointed and ill-conceived tracks that comprised My Winter Storm." Metal Storm criticized the songs, saying "Tarja's compositions are not enough for her vocal abilities" and stated that the highlight of the album is the "simplistic yet symphonic/atmospheric character and Tarja's operatic vocal lines".

In Brazil, What Lies Beneath was named the 8th Best International Album by the readers of the Roadie Crew Magazine.

== Track listings ==
International Edition
No.	Title	Writer(s)	Length
1.	"Anteroom of Death" (featuring Van Canto)	Michelle Leonard; Kiko Masbaum; Tarja Turunen	4:41
2.	"Until My Last Breath"	Johnny Andrews; Turunen	4:24
3.	"I Feel Immortal"	Toby Gad; Lindy Robbins; Kerli Kõiv; Turunen	4:35
4.	"In for a Kill"	Anders Wollbeck; Mattias Lindblom; Turunen	4:35
5.	"Underneath"	Andrews; Turunen	5:27
6.	"Little Lies"	Alex Scholpp; Andrews; Turunen	4:37
7.	"Rivers of Lust"	Kid Crazy; Johan Westmar; Kristoffer Karlsson; Jessika Lundstrom; Turunen	4:24
8.	"Dark Star" (featuring Phil Labonte)	Andrews; Turunen	4:33
9.	"Falling Awake" (featuring Joe Satriani)	Andrews; Turunen	5:14
10.	"The Archive of Lost Dreams"	Turunen	4:49
11.	"Crimson Deep"	Bart Hendrickson; Angela Heldmann; Turunen	7:35

US Edition
No.	Title	Writer(s)	Length
1.	"Anteroom of Death"		4:41
2.	"Until My Last Breath"		4:24
3.	"Dark Star"		4:33
4.	"Underneath"		5:27
5.	"Little Lies"		4:37
6.	"Rivers of Lust"		4:24
7.	"In for a Kill"		4:35
8.	"Montañas de Silencio" (Exclusive US track)	Martin Tillman; Turunen	4:25
9.	"Falling Awake"		5:14
10.	"The Archive of Lost Dreams"		4:49
11.	"Crimson Deep"		7:35

Deluxe Edition Bonus Disc
No.	Title	Writer(s)	Length
1.	"We Are"	Wollbeck; Lindblom; Turunen	4:16
2.	"Naiad"	Torsten Stenzel; Heldmann; Adrian Zagoritis; Turunen	7:19
3.	"Still of the Night" (Whitesnake cover)	David Coverdale; John Sykes	6:33
4.	"Tarja Talks About "What Lies Beneath"" (Not included on US release)		13:58

Japanese Edition & Dreamers Box Set
No.	Title	Length
1.	"Anteroom of Death"	4:41
2.	"Until My Last Breath"	4:24
3.	"Naiad"	7:19
4.	"Dark Star"	4:33
5.	"Underneath"	5:27
6.	"Little Lies"	4:37
7.	"Still of the Night" (Whitesnake cover)	6:33
8.	"Rivers of Lust"	4:24
9.	"In for a Kill"	4:35
10.	"I Feel Immortal"	4:35
11.	"We Are"	4:16
12.	"Falling Awake"	5:14
13.	"The Archive of Lost Dreams"	4:49
14.	"Crimson Deep"	7:35

Dreamers Box Set Bonus Disc
No.	Title	Length
1.	"Dark Star" (Tarja lead vocals version)	4:40
2.	"Montañas de Silencio"	4:21
3.	"If You Believe"	6:49
4.	"The Crying Moon"	3:53
5.	"Underneath" (Orchestral version)	5:00
6.	"I Feel Immortal" (Single version)	4:27
7.	"Falling Awake" (featuring Jason Hook)	4:40
8.	"The Good Die Young" (performed by Scorpions & Tarja)	5:12
9.	"Naiad" (Instrumental extended version)	11:31

== Personnel ==
Credits for What Lies Beneath adapted from liner notes.

=== Musicians ===
Band members

- Tarja Turunen – lead and backing vocals, piano on track 10, producer
- Alex Scholpp – lead and rhythm guitar, acoustic guitar on track 2, bass guitar on track 9, co-producer on tracks 6, 8 and 12
- Christian Kretschmar – keyboards, Hammond organ, piano
- Doug Wimbish – bass guitar
- Mike Terrana – drums

Guests

- The Slovak National Symphony Orchestra and Choir conducted by Tim Davies
- Max Lilja – cello on tracks 1, 3, 8, 10, strings arrangements on track 1, co-producer on track 12
- Jyrki Lasonpalo, Pauline Fleming - violins on track 1
- Rèmi Moingeon - viola on track 1
- Van Canto – vocal extravaganzas on track 1 arranged by Stefan Sebastian Schmidt
- Johnny Andrews - additional keyboards on track 2
- Will Calhoun – drums on tracks 7, 10, 11, 13 percussion on track 2, 10, 13
- Julian Barrett - guitar on track 3, 9 and 14, bass on track 14
- Kid Crazy - keyboards, piano and programming on track 7
- Philip Labonte – vocals on track 8
- Joe Satriani - guitar solo on track 9
- Marzi Nyman – guitar on track 10 and 13
- Bart Hendrickson - acoustic guitar, bass, keyboard programming, orchestral and choir arrangements on track 11, co-producer on track 11
- Torsten Stenzel - keyboards on track 13
- Toni Turunen and Timo Turunen – backing vocals on track 14
- Jason Hook – lead guitar on "Falling Awake" (Dreamers Box Set Bonus Disc)

=== Production ===
- Marcelo Cabuli - producer
- James Dooley - orchestral arrangements
- Mel Wesson - ambient music design and electronic arrangements
- Jetro Vainio, Peter Fuchs, Mario Altamirano, Martin Toledo - recording engineers
- Tim Palmer - mixing on tracks 1, 2, 3, 5, 9, 11, 13
- Colin Richardson - mixing on tracks 4, 6, 8, 12, 14
- Martyn Ford - mixing on tracks 4, 6, 8, 12
- Slamm Andrews - orchestra and choir mixing
- Louie Teran - mastering
- Marcelo Cabuli - executive producer

== Charts ==
Chart performance for What Lies Beneath
Chart (2010)	Peak position
Argentine Albums (CAPIF)	18
Austrian Albums (Ö3 Austria)	12
Belgian Albums (Ultratop Flanders)	46
Belgian Albums (Ultratop Wallonia)	38
Czech Albums (ČNS IFPI)	6
Dutch Albums (Album Top 100)	45
Dutch Alternative Albums (Dutch Charts)	12
European Albums (Billboard)	13
Finnish Albums (Suomen virallinen lista)	7
German Albums (Offizielle Top 100)	4
Greek International Albums (IFPI)	14
Hungarian Albums (MAHASZ)	30
Mexican Albums (Top 100 Mexico)	74
Polish Albums (ZPAV)	28
Russian Albums (2M)	14
Swedish Albums (Sverigetopplistan)	45
Swiss Albums (Schweizer Hitparade)	11
UK Albums (OCC)	115
UK Rock & Metal Albums (OCC)	11
US Heatseekers Albums (Billboard)	24
Chart (2024)	Peak position
UK Progressive Albums (OCC)	24
