= Into the Sun (Tarja song) =

Single by Tarja

from the album Act I: Live in Rosario
- Released: 13 July 2012
- Recorded: 30 March 2012
- Length: 4:32
- Label: Universal Music, earMusic
- Songwriters: Tarja Turunen, Anders Wollbeck, Mattias Lindblom, Steve van Velvet

Tarja singles chronology
"Underneath" (2011)	"Into the Sun" (2012)	"Victim of Ritual" (2013)

Music video
- "Into The Sun" on YouTube

"Into the Sun" is a song by Finnish singer Tarja Turunen, released as the only single from her first live album Act I: Live in Rosario. It was released on 13 July 2012 as a digital single. Later a studio version of the song was recorded and added to Colours in the Dark album as bonus track.

== Music video ==
An official music video was released on 27 July 2012. The music video itself is a remixed live version from her live concert Act I: Live in Rosario.
