= Alex Scholpp =

German guitarist

Alexander Scholpp
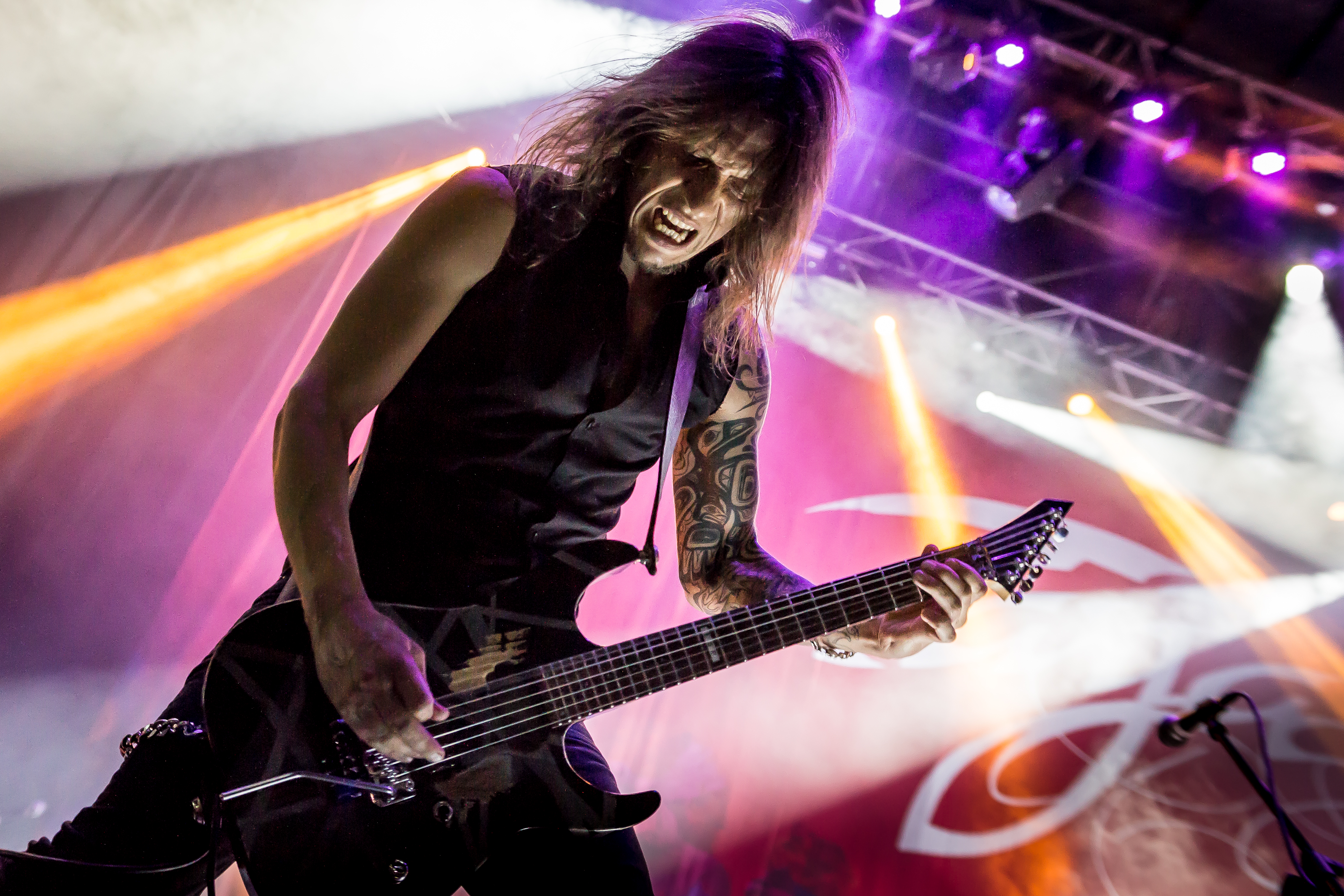
- Scholpp at a performance with Tarja Turunen

Background information
- Born: Stuttgart, West Germany
- Genres: Rock, metal
- Occupations: Musician, composer
- Instrument: Guitar

Alex Scholpp is a German guitarist best known for his work with the metal band Farmer Boys, Tieflader and with Finnish singer Tarja Turunen. He also composes/plays for the bands Tieflader and Sinner. He is also a session guitar player and teaches the guitar in his own music school "Alex Scholpp's Guitar Camp" in Stuttgart.

In the middle of the 90s he was a founding Member of the band Farmer Boys, releasing four albums and touring Europe and is recording for various projects of mixed styles in the studio. In 2003 he founded his music school "Alex Scholpp's Guitar-Camp" in Stuttgart. After more session guitar work (among others "Die Fantastischen Vier") Alex Scholpp is working since 2007 with Tarja Turunen, playing live and recording on all her studio albums. Besides that he has his Metal- Band "Tieflader" and is playing for the German Hard Rock Band "Sinner" and had a project called "The Help" together with Flo Dauner and Doug Wimbish. He worked as author for the German "guitar" magazine for two special issues "School of Metal".

Since 1999 Alex is playing exclusively ESP Guitars, his model being custom variations of the M II- model. He is also an endorser of Blackstar amps using mainly the "Artisan" and "Series One" Amps. For both Brands he is playing clinics and is recording demo- videos.

== AL9X1 (Solo project) ==
AL9X1 (stylized as AL9X1 – Alex Scholpp & Band)

=== History ===
After spending decades as a studio and touring musician for international acts and as a permanent member of various rock and metal bands, Scholpp founded the solo project AL9X1 to realize his own musical vision independently of established band structures. To perform the material live and in the studio, Scholpp assembled a line-up consisting of musicians from the German rock and metal scene.

The project's debut studio album, titled On Teeth, was released on June 25, 2026. The release was celebrated on the same day with a launch show at the Stuttgart cultural venue Im Wizemann.

=== Musical style ===
The music of AL9X1 is characterized as modern, guitar-driven rock and metal. The compositions focus heavily on Scholpp's signature, technically proficient guitar work, combining heavy riffs with melodic elements. The tracks reflect the founder's musical spectrum, ranging from alternative metal to classic hard rock influences.

=== Discography ===
==== Albums ====
- On Teeth (Released: June 25, 2026)
