= Glykeria discography =

Glykeria Greece & Cyprus discography
- Studio albums: 14
- Soundtrack albums: 2
- Live albums: 7
- Compilation albums: 5
- Singles: 3

This page includes the discography of singer Glykeria.

== Albums ==
All the albums listed underneath were released and charted in Greece and Cyprus.

Year	Title	Certification
1978	Mi Kaneis Oneira Trella [Don't Have Crazy Dreams]: Lyra	-
1980	Sta Matia Kita Me [Look Me In The Eyes]	-
1985	Tragoudi Esthimatiko [Emmotional Song]	
1986	Matia Mou [My Eyes]	
1987	Me Panselino [With A Full Moon]	
1990	Ola Mou Ta Mystika [All My Secrets]: Warner Music Group	
1991	Ximerose [A New Day]	
1992	I Hora Ton Thavmaton [The Land Of Miracles]	
1994	Se Mia Schedia [All In One Plan]	
1996	I Glykeria Tragoudai Antoni Vardi [Glykeria Sings Antonis Vardis]: Sony Music	
1998	Maska [Mask]	Gold
2004	Aniksi [Spring Time]	Gold
2006	Vrohi Ton Asterion [Raining Stars]	
2008	Ta Themelia Mou Sta Vouna: Legend Music	
2010	I Agapi Einai Eleftheri (Love is free): Legend Music/Eros	

== Singles ==
Listed below are the CD singles released by Glykeria.

Year	Title	Album/CD Single	Notes
1998	"Anapnoi Anatoli"	Maska	First Greek CD Single from Glykeria by Sony Music.
2006	"O Glyki Mou Ear"	-	Byzantine Easter Hymns sung by Glykeria with the support of an orchestra.
2007	"Akoma Pistevo"	-	Charity CD Single to raise money for a children's cause "ΠΑΣΠ"

== International Releases ==
Glykeria International discography
- Studio albums: 4
- Live albums: 1
- Compilation albums: 8
- Singles: 1

=== Albums ===
All the albums listed underneath were released and charted internationally.

Year	Title	Certification
1994	Golden Hits Israel	Gold
1995	The Voice Of Greece (France)	-
1995	Far Away Israel	-
1997	14 Greek Classics (Israel)	Gold
1998	Sweet Sorrow Israil	-
1998	15 Greek Classics (France)	-
1999	Collection Israil	-
1999	Glykeria With The Israeli Philharmonic Orchestra (Israel)	-
2002	Open Heart Israil	-
2003	Glykeria's Rebetika Songs (Turkey)	-
2004	Best Of/The Voice Of Greece England	-
2004	Best Of (France)	-
2007	Best Turkey	-
2008	Gift (Israel)	-

=== Singles ===
Year	Title	Album/CD Single
1992	"Kane Kati - Baile Me"	Kane Kati - Baile Me
