= Michalis Hatzigiannis discography =

Michalis Chatzigiannis discography
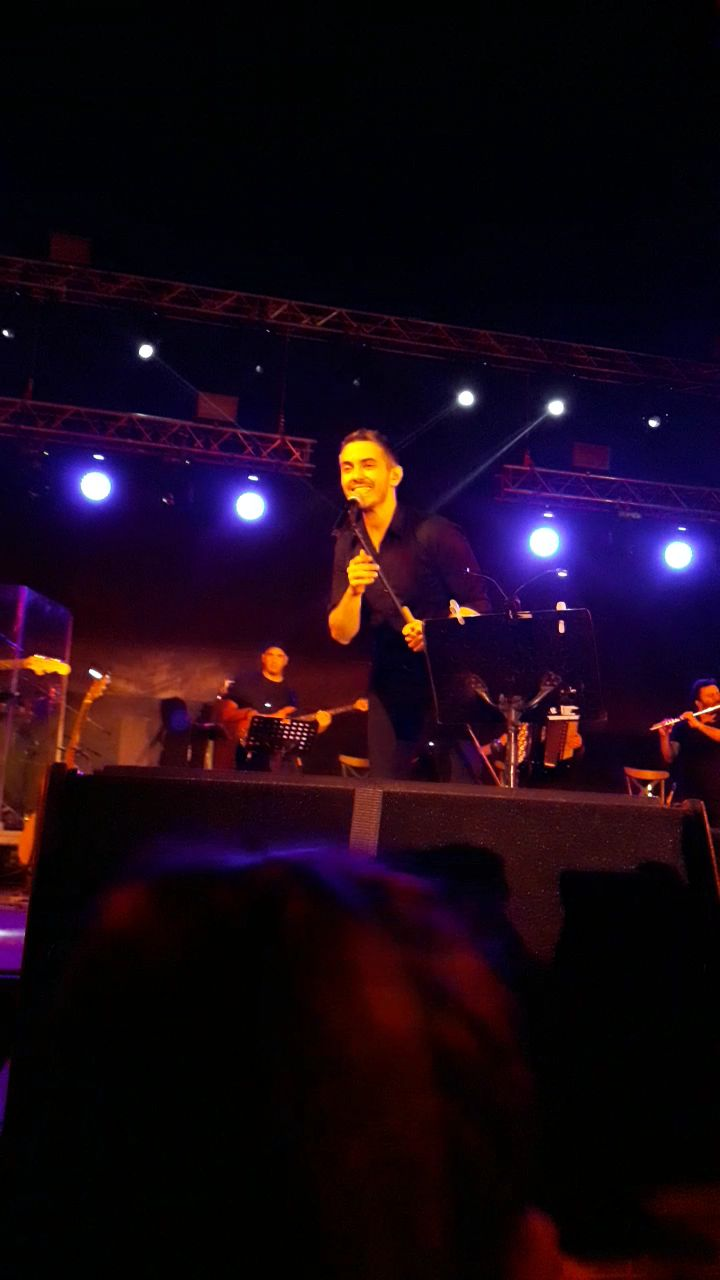
- Chatzigiannis during a concert in Neapoli on 23 August 2019
- Studio albums: 12
- Live albums: 2
- Singles: 23

This is a discography of Greek-Cypriot recording artist Michalis Hatzigiannis, who has been certified for the sales of 645,000 albums and a further 170,000 singles by IFPI Greece since crossing over to the Greek music industry in 1998.

== Albums ==
=== Studio albums ===
==== As lead artist ====
Title	Details	Peak chart positions		Certifications
Title	Details	GRE		Certifications
Paraxeni Giorti	Released: March 2000; Label: RCA; Formats: CD, cassette, digital download	1	1	GRE: Platinum; CYP: Platinum
Kryfo Fili	Released: April 2002; Label: Mercury; Formats: CD, cassette, LP, digital download	1	1	GRE: 3× Platinum; CYP: 2× Platinum
Akatallili Skini	Released: 1 April 2004; Label: Mercury; Formats: CD, digital download	1	1	GRE: 3× Platinum; CYP: Platinum
Filoi Kai Ehthroi	Released: December 2006; Label: M2; Formats: CD, digital download	1	1	GRE: 4× Platinum; CYP: 3× Platinum
7	Released: 29 October 2008; Label: Universal Music Greece; Formats: CD, digital download	1	1	GRE: 5× Platinum; CYP: Platinum
Kolaz	Released: 27 November 2009; Label: Mercury; Formats: CD, digital download	1	1	GRE: 4× Platinum; CYP: Platinum
Mihalis	Released: 28 September 2010; Label: We Love Music; Formats: CD, digital download	−	−	
To Kalitero Psema	Released: 9 December 2010; Label: Mercury; Formats: CD, digital download	1	1	GRE: 5× Platinum; CYP: Platinum
Tharros I Alitheia	Released: 17 December 2011; Label: Mercury; Formats: CD, digital download	–	–	CYP: Platinum
I Agapi Dinamonei	Released: 17 June 2013; Label: Cobalt Music; Formats: CD, digital download	–	–	CYP: Platinum
Erotas Agathi	Released: 22 December 2017; Label: Cobalt Music; Formats: CD, digital download	–	–	
Da Capo - Apo Tin Archi	Released: 11 December 2018; Label: Cobalt Music; Formats: CD, digital download	–	–	
Unplugged	Released: 27 April 2020; Label: Heaven Music; Formats: Digital download	–	–	
Deka Opsis Tis Agapis	Released: 22 July 2022; Label: Heaven Music; Formats: Digital download	–	–	

==== As featured artist ====
Title	Details	Peak chart positions		Certifications
Title	Details	GRE	CYP	Certifications
Klefei O Keros	Artist: Kostas Tournas; Released: April 2000; Label: RCA; Formats: CD, cassette, digital download	1	–	GRE: Platinum
Paraxeno Fos	Artist: Haris Alexiou; Released: December 2000; Label: Estia Recordings; Formats: CD, cassette, digital download	1	–	GRE: Platinum
Echoume Logo	Artist: Despina Olympiou; Released: 19 July 2004; Label: Mercury; Formats: CD, digital download	1	–	GRE: Platinum
Standing Still	Artist: Sophie Marotis; Released: 28 August 2006; Label: At:tack Music; Formats: CD, digital download	–	–	
Mazi Chorista	Artist: Despina Olympiou; Released: 16 May 2007; Label: Mercury; Formats: CD, digital download	–	–	
Reflections	Artist: Aliki; Released: 15 April 2016; Label: Self-released; Formats: CD, digital download	–	–	

=== Live albums ===
Title	Details	Peak chart positions		Certifications
Title	Details	GRE	CYP	Certifications
Live	Released: March 2006; Label: Mercury; Formats: 2CDs + DVD, digital download	1	1	GRE: 3× Platinum
Zontana Sto Likavitto 2007–08	Released: 4 December 2007; Label: M2; Formats: CD + DVD, digital download	1	–	GRE: 2xPlatinum

=== Compilation albums ===
Title	Details	Peak chart positions		Certifications
Title	Details	GRE	CYP	Certifications
Best of Michalis Hatzigiannis 1998–2001	Released: 2003; Label: RCA; Formats: 2CDs + DVD	1	–	GRE: Gold
Apo Party Se Party 1999/2009	Released: April 2009; Label: Universal Music Greece; Formats: 5CDs + DVD	–	–	
Oi Epityhies 1999–2016	Released: 12 December 2016; Label: Cobalt Music; Formats: CD, digital download	–	–	

=== Box sets ===
Title	Details
I Agapi Dinamonei - The Complete Collection (1999-2013)	Released: 3 July 2013; Label: Sony Music / Cobalt Music; Formats: 9CDs

== Singles ==
=== As lead artist ===
Title	Details	Peak chart positions		Certifications
Title	Details	GRE	CYP	Certifications
Netrino	Released: 12 March 1999; Label: RCA; Formats: CD Single	−	−	GRE: Platinum
Den Eho Hrono	Released: 18 June 2001; Label: RCA; Formats: CD Single	2	1	GRE: Platinum
Eimai Edo	Released: 2002; Label: Mercury; Formats: CD Single	–	–	
Monos Mou	Released: May 2003; Label: Mercury; Formats: CD, digital download	1	1	GRE: 3× Platinum
Oneiro Zo	Released: May 2005; Label: Mercury; Formats: CD Single	1	1	GRE: Platinum
Ola I Tipota	Released: August 2006; Label: M2; Formats: CD Single	1	1	GRE: 2× Platinum
Pio Poli	Released: June 2007; Label: M2; Formats: CD Single	1	1	GRE: Platinum
Emeis Oi Dio San Ena	Released: 30 September 2008; Label: Universal Music Greece; Formats: CD	1	1	
Eisai Edo (with OtherView)	Released: 10 November 2009; Label: Universal Music Greece; Formats: Digital download	–	–	
To Kalokairi Mou	Released: July 2010; Label: Mercury; Formats: CD	1	1	GRE: Platinum
Everyone Dance	Released: 30 July 2010; Label: We Love Music; Formats: CD, digital download	–	–	
We Own The World Tonight	Released: 1 June 2012; Label: ARS Entertainment; Formats: Digital download	–	–	
Se Enan Toiho (with Midenistis)	Released: 29 November 2012; Label: Panik Records; Formats: CD, digital download	–	–	
Tha Hatho Prin Figo	Released: 8 December 2015; Label: Cobalt Music; Formats: Digital download	–	–	
Krata Me Edo	Released: 22 June 2016; Label: Cobalt Music; Formats: Digital download	–	–	
Koita Me	Released: 12 May 2017; Label: Cobalt Music; Formats: Digital download	–	–	
Se Poion Na Po To S' Agapo (with Dimitra Galani)	Released: 5 October 2017; Label: Cobalt Music; Formats: Digital download	–	–	
Horevo	Released: 19 June 2020; Label: Heaven Music; Formats: Digital download	1	1	
Min Argis	Released: 8 December 2020; Label: Heaven Music; Formats: Digital download	–	–	
Kanenas Monos	Released: 14 May 2021; Label: Heaven Music; Formats: Digital download	–	–	
Ekdromi 2022 feat Tamta	Released: 18 March 2022; Label: Heaven Music; Formats: Digital download	–	–	
Esi Ise Pano Ap' Ola	Released: 16 September 2022; Label: Heaven Music; Formats: Digital download	–	–	

=== As featured artist ===
Title	Details	Peak chart positions		Certifications
Title	Details	GRE	CYP	Certifications
To Porizin - Gramma	Artist: Dimitris Fanis, Michalis Hatzigiannis; Released: 1995; Label: All Records; Formats: CD	−	−	
Vale Mousiki	Artist: Despina Olympiou; Released: July 2003; Label: Mercury; Formats: CD	1	1	GRE: Platinum
Love Love Love	Artist: Melina Mammas; Released: 19 October 2013; Label: Panik Records; Formats: Digital download	–	–	

=== Remixe singles ===
Title	Details
Mono Sta Oneira Versions	Released: 2000; Label: RCA; Formats: CD
Oi Titloi Tou Telous Remixes	Released: 2001; Label: RCA; Formats: CD

=== Promotional singles ===
Title	Details
Paraxeni Giorti	Released: 2000; Label: RCA; Formats: CD
Den Eho Hrono	Released: 2001; Label: RCA; Formats: CD
Eisai Edo	Released: 2002; Label: Mercury; Formats: CD
Den Fevgo	Released: 2006; Label: Mercury; Formats: CD
Anna	Released: 2009; Label: Mercury; Formats: CDr
4 Mpalantes	Released: 13 February 2011; Label: Mercury; Formats: CD, digital download

== Reissues ==
=== As lead artist ===
Title	Details
Paraxeni Giorti: Limited Edition	Released: March 2001; Label: RCA; Formats: CD
Kryfo Fili: Second Edition	Released: June 2003; Label: Mercury; Formats: CD
Akatallili Skini: Special Collector Edition	Released: July 2005; Label: Mercury; Formats: CD + DVD + CD-ROM
Filoi Kai Ehthroi	Released: March 2007; Label: M2; Formats: CD
Filoi Kai Ehthroi: Special Edition	Released: June 2007; Label: M2; Formats: CD
7: Special Edition	Released: July 2009; Label: Universal Music Greece; Formats: CD + DVD

=== As featured artist ===
Title	Details		
Title	Details	GRE	CYP
Mazi Chorista (Golden Edition)	Artist: Despina Olympiou; Released: 9 May 2008; Label: Mercury; Formats: CD, digital download	–	–

== Soundtracks ==
Title	Details	Peak chart positions		Certifications
Title	Details	GRE	CYP	Certifications
Agigma Psyhis	Released: 1998; Label: RCA; Formats: CD Album	–	–	GRE: Platinum
Netrino	Released: 1999; Label: RCA; Formats: CD Single	–	–	GRE: Platinum
P 20	Released: February 2004; Label: Mercury; Formats: CD Single	1	1	GRE: Gold
Orkos Siopos Simmetexei O Michalis Hatzigiannis	Released: 14 May 2015; Label: Cobalt Music; Formats: CD Single, digital download	–	–	
Pistevo Se Sena	Released: 14 October 2019; Label: Cobalt Music; Formats: Digital download	–	–	
I Kaliteri Mou Fili	Released: 10 December 2019; Label: Heaven Music; Formats: Digital download	–	–	
Vale Ena Kafe	Released: 31 December 2019; Label: Heaven Music; Formats: Digital download	–	–	
Ime Mono Enas Antras	Released: 3 April 2020; Label: Heaven Music; Formats: Digital download	–	–	
To Thavma	Released: 28 April 2021; Label: Heaven Music; Formats: Digital download	–	–	

== Composing and other appearances ==
Year	Song	Album	Artist	Contribution
2003	Vale Mousiki	Vale Mousiki	Despina Olympiou	Composer and executive producer
2004	Echoume Logo	Echoume Logo	Despina Olympiou	Composer and executive producer
2004	Vale Mousiki	Echoume Logo	Despina Olympiou	Composer and executive producer
2004	Den Echo Logia	Echoume Logo	Despina Olympiou	Composer and executive producer
2004	Pare Me Agkalia Kai Pame	Ola Sto Fos	Eleftheria Arvanitaki	Composer and backing vocalist
2004	Os Ta Charamata	Ola Sto Fos	Eleftheria Arvanitaki	Composer and backing vocalist
2005	Apopse	Os Eki Pou I Kardia Bori N' Antexi	Natasa Theodoridou	Composer and backing vocalist
2005	Den Ime Gia Sena	Os Eki Pou I Kardia Bori N' Antexi	Natasa Theodoridou	Composer and backing vocalist
2005	Mia Glikia Melodia	Os Eki Pou I Kardia Bori N' Antexi	Natasa Theodoridou	Composer and backing vocalist
2005	Os Edo	Os Eki Pou I Kardia Bori N' Antexi	Natasa Theodoridou	Composer and backing vocalist
2006	Afto Pou Mas Denei	Paidi Akoma	Eleni Peta	Composer
2006	Skotose Me Akoma Mia Mera	Paidi Akoma	Eleni Peta	Composer
2006	More	Standing Still	Sophie Marotis	Composer
2006	Where Are You	Standing Still	Sophie Marotis	Composer
2006	Akiniti	Pame Makria	Kostas Makedonas	Composer
2006	Mi Fovasai	Pame Makria	Kostas Makedonas	Composer
2006	Krifto	Vrohi Ton Asterion	Glykeria	Composer and backing vocalist
2006	Den Eho Polla	Vrohi Ton Asterion	Glykeria	Composer and backing vocalist
2006	Na Symvei	Vrohi Ton Asterion	Glykeria	Composer and backing vocalist
2006	Mia Fora	Ine Kapies Agapes	Pashalis Terzis	Composer
2007	Pes To Dynata	Mazi Chorista	Despina Olympiou	Composer and executive producer and backing vocalist and 2nd voice
2007	An Isoun Edo	Mazi Chorista	Despina Olympiou	Composer and executive producer and backing vocalist and 2nd voice
2007	S' Agapo (Ma De Ftnei Afto)	Mazi Chorista	Despina Olympiou	Composer and executive producer and backing vocalist and 2nd voice
2007	O Paradisos (De Ftiaxtike Gia Mas)	Mazi Chorista	Despina Olympiou	Composer and executive producer and backing vocalist and 2nd voice
2007	Mi Rotas	Mazi Chorista	Despina Olympiou	Composer and executive producer and backing vocalist and 2nd voice
2007	Tha Se Perimeno	Mazi Chorista	Despina Olympiou	Composer and executive producer and backing vocalist and 2nd voice
2007	Mazi Chorista	Mazi Chorista	Despina Olympiou	Composer and executive producer and backing vocalist and 2nd voice
2007	Edo Einai I Nychtes Mou	Mazi Chorista	Despina Olympiou	Composer and executive producer and backing vocalist and 2nd voice
2007	Giati Na S' Agapo	Mazi Chorista	Despina Olympiou	Composer and executive producer and backing vocalist and 2nd voice
2007	Filika	Mazi Chorista	Despina Olympiou	Composer and executive producer and backing vocalist and 2nd voice
2007	Defterolepta	Mazi Chorista	Despina Olympiou	Composer and executive producer and backing vocalist and 2nd voice
2007	Parto Allios	Mazi Chorista	Despina Olympiou	Composer and executive producer and backing vocalist and 2nd voice
2007	Tha Perimeno Edo	Me To 'Na Podi St' Astra	George Dalaras	Composer
2007	Ola Miloun Gia Sena	Me To 'Na Podi St' Astra	George Dalaras	Composer
2008	Makria Ki Agapimenoi	Mazi Horista (Golden Edition)	Despina Olympiou	Composer and executive producer and backing vocalist
2008	Omorfa Psemata	Mazi Horista (Golden Edition)	Despina Olympiou	Composer and executive producer and backing vocalist
2009	Pano Stin Agapi	Mia Stigmi	Despina Olympiou	Composer and executive producer
2009	Adynamia	Mia Stigmi	Despina Olympiou	Composer and executive producer
2009	Allo Ena Xiemeroma	Mia Stigmi	Despina Olympiou	Composer and executive producer
2009	Mia Stigmi	Mia Stigmi	Despina Olympiou	Composer and executive producer
2009	Mia Voutia Sto S' Agapo	Mia Stigmi	Despina Olympiou	Composer and executive producer
2009	Gela	Mia Stigmi	Despina Olympiou	Composer and executive producer
2009	Dimosies Scheseis	Mia Stigmi	Despina Olympiou	Composer and executive producer
2009	Gyrises Xena	Mia Stigmi	Despina Olympiou	Composer and executive producer
2009	Mi M' Agapas	Mia Stigmi	Despina Olympiou	Composer and executive producer
2009	Zise Opos Zeis	Mia Stigmi	Despina Olympiou	Composer and executive producer
2011	Mi M' Agapas	Etsi Laika	Vasilis Karras	Composer
2012	Na Mou Exigiseis	—N/a	Valando Tryfonos	Composer and executive producer
2012	Min Pas Pouthena	Lipi Pali O Theos	Giorgos Mazonakis	Composer
2013	De Se Stamataei Tipota	—N/a	Christina Gerani	Composer and executive producer
2014	Mia Fora Sto Toso	—N/a	Malu	Composer
2014	Poia Zoi	—N/a	Malu	Composer
2014	Pio Konta	—N/a	Melina Mammas	Composer and executive producer
2015	Afino Anichta	—N/a	Christina Gerani	Composer
2019	Mia Fora Sto Toso	Ores Aixmis	Malu	Composer
2019	Poia Zoi	Ores Aixmis	Malu	Composer
2019	Se Ola Nai	Ores Aixmis	Malu	Composer
2019	Min M' Agapas	—N/a	Inco	Composer
2020	Skotose Me	—N/a	Melina Mammas	Composer
2021	Nikites Hameni	—N/a	Alkistis Protopsalti	Composer
2021	Ypervoles	—N/a	Panos Kiamos	Co-composer
