= 7 (Michalis Hatzigiannis album) =

Studio album by Michalis Hatzigiannis
- Released: 29 October 2008
- Recorded: 2008
- Genre: Pop rock, éntekhno, pop, contemporary laïka
- Length: 44:17
- Language: Greek
- Label: Universal
- Producer: Michalis Hatzigiannis/M2

Michalis Hatzigiannis chronology
Fili Ki Ehthri (2006)	7 (2008)	Kolaz (2009)

Singles from 7
- 1. "Emeis I Dio San Ena" Released: 30 September 2008; 2. "Ola Tha Pane Kala" Released: December 2008; 3. "Anapoda" Released: February 2009; 4. "Parta Ola Dika Sou" Released: July 2009

Professional ratings
Review scores
Source	Rating
Avopolis	1.5/5 stars
MusicCorner	mixed

7 is the fifth studio album by Greek singer-songwriter Michalis Hatzigiannis. The first studio album released following his 2006 4× platinum Fili Ki Ehthri, it is entirely composed by Hatzigiannis, and was released by Universal Music Greece on 29 October 2008. It was certified Platinum in the first week of its release, and was later certified 2× Platinum within a month for 60,000 copies and becoming the best-selling album of the year in Greece. After IFPI lowered their sales thresholds in 2009, the album was certified 5× Platinum for the same sales, making it his most successful album in terms of certifications, but his second least successful studio album overall in Greece, following his debut Paraxeni Giorti.

== Background ==
7 is Hatzigiannis' seventh album release in Greece, having released four commercially successful studio albums and two live albums since 2000. However, this count does not include the three rare albums he had released in Cyprus prior to him settling in Greece and which do not form part of his official discography. Thus, the title 7 justifies the album's ranking as being the seventh album of his career as a famed singer-songwriter in Greece. 7 features 11 new tracks with music written by Hatzigiannis himself. Lyrics are by Nikos Moraitis and Eleana Vrahali, with "Alli Mia Nihta" being written entirely by Hatzigiannis. The album includes the song "I Agapi Pou Meni" (Polikatikia), which is also the title track to the Greek show I Polikatikia (The Apartment Building) on Mega Channel. The album was sponsored by OTE, which had also sponsored many of Hatzigiannis' past albums and singles. The album was also released as a "special edition", that includes a bonus booklet. Backing vocals are performed by Despina Olympiou on tracks 3, 7 and 10, and by Marlen Angelidou on tracks 4, 5 and 8.

== Critical reception ==
Following the success of Hatzigiannis' previous studio album, Fili & Ehthri, expectations for this album were high. Critical reception to the album was mostly positive, with some critics believing that Fili ki Ehthri was superior. On a negative extreme, the Greek site Avopolos, which is typically known to give lower reviews, gave the album a very low rating of 1.5/5 stars, rating as "bad" according to their system, one level above "unacceptable". Anastasia Touroutoglou who reviewed the album expressed that Hatzigiannis had "all of the factors for large commercial success" and that he attracts the younger generation of music consumers, saying that "at this moment his records sell like crazy". However, Touroutoglou was unimpressed with Hatzigiannis' album. Hatzigiannis' press release in promotion of the album included a statement saying that he "is the most restless and most inspired producer of the contemporary Greek scene", which she heavily contradicted by saying "in reality 7 is nothing more than a record based on [methods that has been done a thousand times] for commercial success." She claimed that "Emeis I Dyo San Ena" was merely a repeat of his past hits and that "'I Agapi Pou Meni' consists of lyrics so incoherent that in the end the only thing left for you to do is to completely ignore them and follow its pop melody." Touroutoglou further claimed that despite their low quality, those were actually the strong points of the album. She described "Mi Me Kitas" as a song that would not need too many changes to fit into the Greek bouzouki club scene, in criticism of Hatzigiannis' more pop image in recent years, while she panned his attempt at infusing reggae in "Ola Tha Pane Kala", calling it "uninspired". However, she supported him in the éntekhno genre, saying that while the song "Thalassa" is nothing special, his vocals sound warm and expressive in it. She finally critiques the songs "Anapoda" and "Anaptiras" which she described as typical in his trend, saying that "even if they were joyful in the past, the continuous self-repetition will accomplish I'm afraid, to alter the meaning of pop with that of simplicity". She concluded to say that the "biggest pity" in Hatzigiannis' case "is that he is capable of being a person who, if he can pull away from the logic of commercial success, he could [...] with the immense popularity that he has, bring the contemporary Greek [laïka music] scene a level higher [in popularity]." She asserted that Hatzigiannis is compromising artistry for commercial success with his crossover to simple, bouncy pop tunes in recent years and declares that the album 7 had no reason to be released apart from an obligation to do so as two years had passed since his last album.

== Commercial performance ==
7 debuted on the Greek Albums Chart at number one on week 45/2008; it had an opening sales week of at least 30,000 copies, and thus was also certified platinum in its first week of release. After three weeks at number one, it dipped to number three before rebounding to number one on week 49 where it also stayed for the following two weeks. 7 reached 2× Platinum within a month of its release. By its eighth week on the chart, 7 dropped from number one to number fifteen, but by week nine, it moved up to number nine, and then to number seven the following week. As of the week 11/2009 charts, the album has charted for 16 weeks.

In March 2009 IFPI announced that they would close their charts for a period of time in order to re-new their charting system, thus it was not possible to track the chart and sales records of 7. On July 17, 2009, IFPI confirmed that the album reached 5× platinum status in Greece under the new sales thresholds that were significantly lowered. 7 in fact was actually only certified 5× Platinum with the previously confirmed 60,000 sales (with a Platinum certification now being awarded at 12,000 copies), not for additional sales. 7 was eligible to be re-certified with the same sales because it was charting in 2009. IFPI is set to resume operations in the coming months. The album is Hatzigiannis' most successful in terms of IFPI certifications, however, in actuality, it was far less commercially and critically successful than his previous studio album, which sold double the amount of 7. 7 is also Hatzigiannis' least successful studio album since his Greek debut Paraxeni Giorti in 2000.

The album was ranked number one on both IFPI's Year-end charts for Top 50 Greek albums of 2008, and Top 50 Greek and International albums of 2008. This was a strong achievement especially as it was released in the last quarter of the year, and only eight weeks worth of sales were eligible for counting. Nevertheless, it still by far outsold the other albums of the year in Greece, with its closest competitor, Elena Paparizou's Vrisko To Logo Na Zo being ranked second for sales of at least 30,000.

In Cyprus the album also charted at number one. In July 2009 it was announced by Hatzigiannis local promoters Cyta (Cyprus Telecommunications) that the album went Platinum.

== Singles ==
"Emeis I Dio San Ena"

The lead single is "Emeis Oi Dio San Ena" and it was released as a CD single on 30 September 2008. The song reached number one on the Greek airplay charts.

"Ola Tha Pane Kala"

The second single off the album was "Ola Tha Pane Kala", and was released along with a video clip. The video clip was directed by White Room. Although the song "I Agapi Pou Meni" was number one on the digital download charts at the time of "Ola Tha Pane Kala"'s release, and in the top five of the Greek airplay charts, it was decided to skip over the song in favor of "Ola Tha Pane Kala", since it was the title track to a new Greek movie of the same name released in January.

"Anapoda"

The third single from the album was "Anapoda", and was released to radio stations in February 2009. The music video for the single, directed by White Room, was released on 19 February 2009. The single peaked at number 1 on the Greek Airplay chart.

"Parta Ola Dika Sou"

The fourth single from the album is "Parta Ola Dika Sou" and was released to radio stations in July 2009. The music video for the song was released on 29 July 2009 and is directed by Konstantinos Rigos.

== Track listing ==
All music is composed by Michalis Hatzigiannis.

No.	Title	Lyrics	Length
1.	"Emeis I Dio San Ena" (Us two like one)	Nikos Moraitis	3:25
2.	"I Agapi Pou Menei (Polikatikia)" (Where does love live [Apartment building])	Nikos Moraitis	3:25
3.	"Niose Konta Mou" (Feel close to me)	Eleana Vrahali	3:12
4.	"Mi Me Kitas" (Don't look at me)	Eleana Vrahali	3:00
5.	"Ola Tha Pane Kala" (Everything will go well)	Eleana Vrahali	4:25
6.	"Thalassa" (Sea)	Eleana Vrahali	3:53
7.	"Par' Ta Ola Dika Sou" (Take it all for yourself)	Eleana Vrahali	5:17
8.	"Alli Mia Nihta" (One more night)	Michalis Hatzigiannis	3:54
9.	"Pou Na Se Vro" (Where can I find you)	Eleana Vrahali	3:35
10.	"Anapoda" (Upside down)	Eleana Vrahali	5:03
11.	"Anaptiras" (Lighter)	Nikos Moraitis	5:01

== Charts ==
=== Weekly charts ===
Chart (2008)	Peak position	Certification
Greek Albums Chart (IFPI)	1	5× Platinum
Cypriot Album Chart (Musical Paradise Top 10)	1	Platinum

=== Year-end charts ===
2008 year-end chart performance for 7
Chart (2008)	Position
Top 50 Greek Albums of 2008 (IFPI)	1
Top 50 Greek and International Albums of 2008 (IFPI)	1

== Release history ==
Region	Date	Label	Format
Greece	29 October 2008	Universal Music	CD
Cyprus	29 October 2008	Universal Music	CD

== See also ==
- Michalis Hatzigiannis discography
