= O Glyki Mou Ear =

EP by Glykeria
- Released: April 2006
- Genre: Church music, Byzantine music, Hymns
- Length: 24:48
- Language: Greek
- Label: Eros Music

Glykeria chronology
Aniksi (2004)	O Glyki Mou Ear (2006)	Vrohi Ton Asterion (2006)

Alternative Cover
- Reissue

O Glyki Mou Ear (Greek: Ω Γλυκύ Μου Έαρ) is a religious Extended play album by popular Greek artist Glykeria. It was released in April 2006 by Eros Music Greece and was released to coincide with Easter of that year. The songs included on the album are Greek Orthodox hymns which are sung on Good Friday of Holy Week. The music is produced by an orchestra.

In March 2008, two years after its original release, Eros re-released the EP with the same tracks, however the second and third track's order was switched.

== Track listing ==
- Original release
1. "I Zoi En Tafo" - 5:34
2. "Axion Esti" - 1:59
3. "O Glyki Mou Ear" - 9:28
4. "O Nimfonas" - 2:22
5. "O Glyki Mou Ear" (Instrumental) - 6:05
- Re-release
1. "I Zoi En Tafo" - 5:34
2. "O Glyki Mou Ear" - 9:28
3. "Axion Esti" - 1:59
4. "O Nimfonas" - 2:22
5. "O Glyki Mou Ear" (Instrumental) - 6:05

== Charts ==
The EP charted on the Greek Albums Chart for seven weeks, reaching its peak position of 20 shortly after Orthodox Easter in April 2009.

Chart	Provider	Peak position	Weeks on chart
Greek Albums Chart	IFPI	20	7
