= The Seer (EP) =

The Seer EP

EP by Tarja Turunen
- Released: 1 December 2008 (United Kingdom)
- Recorded: 2007–2008
- Genres: Symphonic metal; symphonic rock
- Length: 49:13
- Label: Spinefarm UK

Tarja Turunen chronology
| My Winter Storm (2007) | The Seer EP (2008) | What Lies Beneath (2010) |

The Seer is the first EP by the Finnish singer Tarja Turunen. It was limited to 1,000 copies and is available only in the United Kingdom. It contains a brand new duet with Doro Pesch, remixes of tracks from My Winter Storm and live recordings. The EP was released by Spinefarm on 1 December 2008.

== Track listing ==
| No. | Title | Writer(s) | Length |
|---|---|---|---|
| 1. | "The Seer" (feat. Doro Pesch) | Alexander Komlew | 4:22 |
| 2. | "Lost Northern Star" (Tägtgren Remix) | Kiko Masbaum; Michelle Leonard; Tarja Turunen | 4:35 |
| 3. | "The Reign" (Score Mix) | Adrian Zagoritis; Torsten Stenzel; Angela Heldmann; Turunen | 4:47 |
| 4. | "Die Alive" (Alternative Version) | Anders Wollbeck; Mattias Lindblom; Turunen; Hanne Sørvaag | 4:08 |
| 5. | "Boy and the Ghost" (Izumix) | Jessika Lundstrom; Anine Stang; Alexander Jonsson; Lindblom; Wollbeck; Turunen | 4:14 |
| 6. | "Calling Grace" (Full Version) | Masbaum; Leonard; Turunen | 3:18 |
| 7. | "Lost Northern Star" (Ambience Sublow Mix) | Masbaum; Leonard; Turunen | 4:56 |
| 8. | "Damned and Divine" (live in Kuusankoski) | Zagoritis; Stenzel; Heldmann; Turunen | 5:44 |
| 9. | "You Would Have Loved This" (live in Kuusankoski) | Cori Connors | 4:04 |
| 10. | "Our Great Divide" (live in Kuusankoski) | Wollbeck; Sørvaag; Lindblom; Turunen | 5:16 |
| 11. | "Ciarán's Well" (live in Kuusankoski) | Alex Scholpp; Leonard; Doug Wimbish; Turunen | 3:48 |
