= Anapnoi Anatoli =

"Anapnoi Anatoli Αναπνοή Ανατολή"

Single by Glykeria

from the album Maska
- Released: January 1998
- Genre: Pop, Modern Laika, Dance
- Label: Sony Music/Columbia
- Songwriter: Stelios Fotiadis

Glykeria singles chronology
"Kane Kati" (1992)	"Anapnoi Anatoli; Αναπνοή Ανατολή" (1998)	"O Glyki Mou Ear" (2006)

"Anapnoi Anatoli" (Greek: Αναπνοή Ανατολή; English: Breaths from the east) is a popular CD single from popular Greek artist Glykeria. It was released in December 1997 by Sony Music Greece and was a precursor to her successful 1998 album Maska.

== Track listing ==
No.	Title	Lyrics	Music	Length
1.	"Anapnoi Anatoli (Radio Edit)" (Breaths from the east)	Stelios Fotiadis	Stelios Fotiadis	4:00
2.	"Mia Zoi" (One life)			3:29
3.	"Anapnoi Anatoli (Club Mix)" (Breaths from the east)	Stelios Fotiadis	Stelios Fotiadis	4:28
4.	"Pare Me Apopse, Pare Me (feat. Nikos Ziogalas)" (Take me tonight, take me)	Nikos Ziogalas	Nikos Ziogalas	3:22
