= Die Alive (song) =

Single by Tarja Turunen

from the album My Winter Storm
- Released: March 7, 2008
- Genre: Symphonic rock, symphonic metal
- Length: 3:23
- Label: Universal Music
- Songwriter(s): Anders Wollbeck, Mattias Lindblom, Tarja Turunen

Tarja Turunen singles chronology
"I Walk Alone" (2007)	"Die Alive" (2008)	"Enough" (2008)

Music video
- "Die Alive" on YouTube

"Die Alive" is the second single by Tarja from the album My Winter Storm. The single was released on March 7, 2008 via Universal Music label. The video for the song was recorded in December, and it premiered in January.

== Song ==
This song, as well as the second single from Tarja's debut album, was written by Swedish songwriting duo Anders Wollbeck and Mattias Lindblom, and Tarja. On January 16, 2008, Tarja posted summaries on her blog for each song of My Winter Storm, including "Die Alive":

This is a song about living every moment of your life fully. Is a fight song without any swords or blood. A fight to do what you want to do in your life, in a way that if you die tomorrow, you die alive. Not like many people that are already dead while they are still living. Jim Dooley added the feeling of a movie trailer in the middle part of the song.

== Video ==
The video for "Die Alive" is considerably darker than her previous one for "I Walk Alone", and any videos she had shot with Nightwish in the past.

=== Synopsis ===
The video starts with shots of a mansion during a stormy night, where a dog is running free. We then see the dog in a room sitting beside Tarja, who is sleeping on a mattress. As she tries to pet it, it bites her, leaving a bloody gash. As Tarja walks around the mansion, she comes across a room where there is a black and violet robe sitting on a table. Fascinated by it, she begins to put it on. As her hand passes through the sleeve, her wound is healed and disappears. We then see shots of her in another room, singing and wearing the robe.

Tarja explores the mansion more. She comes across a room with a heavy door. Opening it, many rats come in and she shuts it promptly.

During the middle eight, Tarja comes across a door that is seemingly being pounded against by an unseen entity, witnessed also by six dogs. When the strings come to a climax, the doors are blown apart with enormous force. We then see the robed Tarja outside, standing amidst a pile of rubble, which is aflame with a mystical blue glow.

The other Tarja then exits the mansion out the front door as a mysterious wind blows in. The video ends with the robed Tarja standing against the rain, after the storm has calmed down.

== Track listing ==
1. Die Alive (Album Version)
2. Die Alive (Alternative Version)
3. Lost Northern Star (Ambience Sublow Mix)
4. Calling Grace (Full Version)
5. Die Alive (Video)

== Charts ==
Chart	Peak position
Germany Singles Charts	76
Czech Republic Radio Modern Rock	11
