= Adrian Zagoritis =

British songwriter and record producer (born 1968)

- Also known as: Adrian Zag
- Born: Adrian Dimitri Andrew Zagoritis; 27 September 1968 (age 58); Nairobi, Kenya
- Genres: Pop, Electro, Progressive house
- Occupations: Songwriter, producer
- Instruments: Drums, Keyboards, Vocals
- Years active: 2000 – present
- Labels: EMI, Universal, Sony BMG, Ministry of Sound, Mercury, Kontor, Spinnin' Records, Armada Music (as producer / songwriter)

Adrian Dimitri Andrew Zagoritis (born 27 September 1968) is a British songwriter and record producer, whose songs are published by Universal UK and EMI Germany. Primarily a pop dance writer working often with award-winning German electronica act York, he has also had success with Pop Idol and The X Factor winners and pop artists in Germany, Holland, Belgium, Spain, France, and Japan.

== Biography ==
=== Early life ===
Adrian Zagoritis started life in Nairobi. Music took a back seat to sport at school in UK where he captained the Eton cricket 1st XI and represented the Independent Schools Football Association (ISFA) XI as a goalkeeper against Arsenal, QPR and Chelsea youth sides in 1986.

=== Career ===
Travelling from Kenya to the UK he worked with artists Sybil, Mel Gaynor from Simple Minds and Maxi Priest. Although writing and arranging several tracks for Mel Gaynor's band 'The Fusion Project' in 1997, the album was never released as Gaynor rejoined Simple Minds for a world tour instead.

=== Songwriting and production – 2000 to 2007 ===
Zagoritis settled in the UK in the new millennium fully committed to a musical career. Collaborations with writers Geoffrey Williams, Rob Harris and Matt Johnson, both of Jamiroquai saw releases spawned with South African Popstars winners Jamali and Greek Popstars winners Hi-5. Hi-5 turned two Zagoritis singles 'M’ena Fili' and 'Gennithika Ksana' into Top 10 hits, the latter peaking at No. 5. Both albums achieved platinum status and Gennithika Ksana was nominated for an Arion award.

In 2004 Zagoritis began working with Torsten Stenzel, one half of the electronica act York whose second single, "On The Beach", which sampled Chris Rea's song of the same name, reached No. 4 in the UK Singles Chart in June 2000.

One of the first of many releases of this partnership was the club hit "Iceflowers" which was supported by Judge Jules and Paul van Dyk. Zagoritis and Stenzel wrote several tracks for the EMI-released York album Peace which also contained their often-remixed song "Mercury Rising".

In 2005, Dutch singer EliZe released his song "Automatic" which charted in the Top 10 in several countries. He also co-wrote a song following Liverpool F.C.'s penalty shootout win in the 2004–05 UEFA Champions League final, performed by The Trophy Boyz.

Mainstream pop releases followed in 2006 with Holland's EMI act ROOOM charting with a Zagoritis/Geoffrey Williams single named "First Thing", reaching No. 33.

In 2007 Germany's Popstars winners No Angels, and DSDS (Germany's X-factor equivalent) runner-up Linda Teodosiu (Sony), also chose his songs: "The Rhythm Of My Heart" was included on the former's album called Destiny which reached No. 4 in the UK Albums Chart.

=== 2007 – 2010 ===
Nightwish ex-lead singer Tarja Turunen included several Zag songs for her debut solo album My Winter Storm. Turunen had split acrimoniously from her band and her album contained many veiled references to these experiences, as well as a brooding darkness. Zagoritis's "Damned And Divine", "The Reign" and "Sunset" reflect this mood and demonstrated further ability away from mainstream pop or dance music. My Winter Storm took the No. 1 spot on the Finnish charts, and went platinum in Finland and double platinum in Russia, as well as reaching gold status in Germany, Hungary, and Switzerland. It reached No. 3 in Germany. In late 2007, Turunen was nominated for an Echo as best newcomer and an Emma for best Finnish artist.

On Turunen's next album, What Lies Beneath, a title track composed by Zagoritis, Stenzel and Heldmann, he contributed "Naiad" which he also wrote with Tarja. The album reached No. 4 in Germany and charted in eight other countries.

As a melodician and lyricist his style naturally gravitates to pop music and so a return to such projects followed with several releases for Natalia, Idol star in Belgium. The Zagoritis song "Soul Divided" written with Madonna writer Greg Fitzgerald was released along with two other of his tunes on Natalia's 2009 album, Wise Girl which reached No. 1 for two weeks. The album achieved platinum status.

"Soul Divided" was also covered in Japanese by Avex-signed artist Mihiro in 2010, renamed "Weekend".

Universal Germany artist Mihalis took eight Zagoritis lyrics for his album recorded in 2009, simply named Mihalis. Seven of the songs were translations of his past Greek hits. One original song, "Favourite Mistake", was written by Zagoritis and Grammy and Ivor Novello award-winner Rob Davis.

Progressive house projects continued in 2009 tracks with "Tears on My Skin", also written with Davis and released on several albums including top-seller Dream Dance, and Free The Night signed by renowned A+R Eddie O' Loughlin to his Next Plateau label, distributed by Universal. Free The Night failed to chart.

Edurne the Spanish pop singer released "Tan Artificial" written by Zagoritis on Nueva Piel, a Sony BMG album that reached No. 16 in March 2010.

=== Current ===
Kate Ryan, Robbins Entertainment World Music Award winner releases her album, Electroshock in March 2012, the title track written by Zagoritis. It also contains his song "Walk to the Beat" penned with Jukka Immonen.

Zagoritis and Stenzel still work on songs for the latter's act York. "If Only I" was another collaboration which will also include featured vocals from Danish songstress Tanja Thulau from Danish electronica act Luke.

Armada Music, record label of DJ Armin van Buuren released Zag's co-written singles "Top of the Universe" and "Breaking The Rules" in 2013. Also in 2013 in the mainstream pop world Baptiste Giabiconi had a No.1 hit in France with the song "One Night In Paradise", co-written by Zagoritis and others. Giabiconi is a male model who had been discovered by Karl Lagerfeld.

In 2015, "Million Miles" co-written by Zagoritis and Funkstar De Luxe was released in January by Lifted House/CO^{2} Records and reached No. 8 in the British Dance Chart in April, spending 10 consecutive weeks in the Top 20. The song features vocals by Geoffrey Williams who wrote Michael Jackson's "Whatever Happens". Funkstar De Luxe is renowned for his hit single "'Sun Is Shining' (Bob Marley vs Funkstar De Luxe)" which reached No. 3 in the UK and No. 1 in the U.S. Billboard chart.

In 2017, Zagoritis and Funkstar formed a new group 'Mr. Anderson', a retro 1980s funk/RnB act featuring Xantoné Blacq, keyboardist and vocalist from Amy Winehouse. The debut Mr. Anderson single "Cinderella" was released in early 2018. His collaboration with Funkstar De Luxe in the same year, Super Disco, reached no.5 in Switzerland.

2020 saw Adrian set up a fledgling Production Label, Hummingbird Music, with angel investor funding. Hummingbird's first signing was young British singer/songwriter Ladybyrd who quickly gained the attention of BBC Music Introducing with her brand of cinematic-inspired indie pop naming her as “one of 2022's outstanding newcomers”. Ladybyrd also appeared as 'Breaking Act' in The Sunday Times Culture magazine in 2023.

In 2024 Zag's collaboration with Manfred Mann lead singer and Ivor Novello award-winner Mike d'Abo and Bill Oakes, the Grammy Award-winning music producer of the hit films Grease and Saturday Night Fever spawned a musical named Handbags & Gladrags after the hit song penned by d’Abo. The musical was showcased in 2025.

== Film and television work ==
Zagoritis' songs have appeared in several films, including the 2009 film Fire starring Gary Dourdan, South Park, the 2010 movie Burning Palms directed by Christopher Landon starring Rosamund Pike, and in the film Electric.

His song "Sleepwalking" was co-written by Rob Harris of Jamiroquai and appears in the 2014 US-released movie The Right Kind of Wrong.

"Unbreakable", co-written with Geoffrey Williams features in a pivotal scene of the 2016 film Showing Roots, starring Elizabeth McGovern of Downton Abbey fame.

== Discography (selected) ==
2003

- M'ena Fili – Hi-5 (Warner)

2004

- Iceflowers – York (EMI/Offshore)
- Gennithika Ksana – Hi-5 (Warner)
- Mercury Rising – York (EMI/Offshore)

2005

- Automatic – EliZe (Spinnin Rec)

2006

- First Thing – R.O.O.O.M. (EMI)
- Get Up – R.O.O.O.M. (EMI)

2007

- Freeze The Frame – Panevino (Purple Music)
- Love Automatic – Cassis (Pony Canyon)

2008 Naughty – AfricanTwins (EMI/Offshore)

- I Spy – Spencer and Hill (Zooland)

2009

- So Invincible – Victoria (SoBeHo)
- In Danger – MSTRSS (Ultra)

2010

- Free The Night – Aquene (Next Plateau)
- Dirty Love – Risskee (Universal/AATW)

2011

- I Roam – Antillas (Plus 39)
- I Spy – Spencer and Hill (Atlantic)

2012

- Electroshock – Kate Ryan (Universal)
- System Addict – Blank & Jones (Kontor)
- Top of the Universe – Antillas (Armada)

2013

- If Only I feat. Tanja Vesterdahl (Armada)
- One Night in Paradise – Baptiste Giabiconi (Be1st Media)
- So I'm Beautiful – Sweetbox (Sony Music)

2014

- The Reign - Tarja Turunen & Mike Terrana (Ear Music)

2015

- Million Miles feat. Geoffrey Williams - Funkstar Deluxe (CO^{2} Music)

== Charts and awards ==
Releases shown with chart position/territory/certification (where applicable)

| Year | Title | Chart Positions | | | | | | | | | | | | | | | | Certification | |
| Year | Title | GER | AUT | SWI | GR | NL | FI | PL | FR | JP | RU | HU | CZE | BE | IT | NO | UK | Certification | ES |
|---|---|---|---|---|---|---|---|---|---|---|---|---|---|---|---|---|---|---|---|
| 2003 | Hi-5 – M'ena Fili | | | | 12 | | | | | | | | | | | | | Gold (GR) | |
| 2003 | Hi-5 – A Night Like This | | | | 3 | | | | | | | | | | | | | Gold (GR) | |
| 2004 | Hi-5 – Born Again | | | | 5 | | | | | | | | | | | | | Gold (GR) | |
| 2005 | EliZe – Automatic | 63 | | | | 7 | 11 | 15 | 67 | | | | | 18 | | | | | |
| 2005 | Martina Balogova – Gonna Give You Something | | | | | | | | | | | | 1 | | | | | | |
| 2006 | ROOOM – First Thing | | | | | 33 | | | | | | | | | | | | | |
| 2007 | Cassis – Love Automatic | | | | | | | | | 51 | | | | | | | | | |
| 2007 | Tarja Turunen – My Winter Storm | 3 | 11 | 15 | | | 1 | | | | | 18 | | | | 36 | | Gold (GER, SWI, CZE, HU) Platinum (FI, RU) | |
| 2007 | No Angels – Destiny | 4 | 14 | 22 | | | | | | | | | | | | | | | |
| 2008 | Room 2012 – First Thing | 10 | 20 | 22 | | | | | | | | | | | | | | | |
| 2009 | Natalia – Wise Girl | | | | | | | | | | | | | 1 | | | | Platinum (BE) | |
| 2010 | Edurne – Tan Artificial | | | | | | | | | | | | | | | 16 | | | |
| 2010 | Tarja Turunen – What Lies Beneath | 4 | 12 | 11 | 14 | | 7 | | | | 14 | | 6 | | 1 | | | | |
| 2012 | Kate Ryan – Electroshock | | | | | | | | | | | | | 6 | | | | | |
| 2012 | Baptiste – One Night in Paradise | | | | | | | | 1 | | | | | | | | | Platinum (FR) | |
| 2013 | Sweetbox – So I'm Beautiful | | | | | | | | | 4 | | | | | | | | | |
| 2015 | Funkstar Deluxe – Million Miles | | | 11 | | | | | | | | | | 29 | | | 8 | | |
| 2016 | York – Moving In The Shadows | | | | | | | 2 | | | | | | | | | | | |
| 2017 | Funkstar Deluxe – Super Disco | | | 5 | | | | | | | | | | | | | | | |
