= I Walk Alone (Tarja song) =

Single by Tarja

from the album My Winter Storm
- Released: October 26, 2007
- Genre: Symphonic rock
- Length: 3:53
- Label: Universal Music
- Songwriters: Anders Wollbeck, Mattias Lindblom, Harry Sommerdahl

Tarja singles chronology
"You Would Have Loved This" (2006)	"I Walk Alone" (2007)	"Die Alive" (2008)

Music video
- "I Walk Alone" on YouTube

"I Walk Alone" is the first single from the album My Winter Storm by Finnish vocalist Tarja. The single was released on October 26, 2007, through Universal Music label.

== Song ==
This song was written by Harry Sommerdahl, Mattias Lindblom and Anders Wollbeck. It was inspired by a musical motif in Requiem by Mozart. It features a theater atmosphere accompanied by orchestra, guitars, and Turunen's voice.

According to Turunen the song "describes her personality perfectly well and identifies her as a singer".

Some fans have considered this as her response to Nightwish's "Bye Bye Beautiful" from the album Dark Passion Play (2007), which was a song directed towards her. The song was a declaration of her independence and willingness to move on.

In 2009, the song was covered by the Norwegian singer Jørn Lande on his album Spirit Black.

== Video ==
The video was shot at Teufelssee in Berlin, Germany. It was directed by Jörn Heitmann (who had already worked with Turunen directing Nightwish's Sleeping Sun 2005 video). It also features four characters interpreted by Turunen herself. They are: the Phoenix, the Dead Boy, the Doll and the Ice Queen.

== Charts ==
Chart (2007)	Peak position
Austria Singles Charts	37
European Singles Charts	61
Finnish Singles Charts	6
Germany Singles Charts	16
Switzerland Singles Charts	49

== Track listing ==
The single features 3 different configurations:

Version 1
1 - I Walk Alone (Single Version)
2 - I Walk Alone (In Extremo Remix)

Version 2 – Single Cut
1 - I Walk Alone (Single Version)
2 - The Reign (Album Track)
3 - I Walk Alone (The Tweaker Remix)
4 - I Walk Alone (Single Version) [Video]

Version 3 – Artist Cut
1 - I Walk Alone (Artist Version)
2 - Ciarán's Well (Album Track)
3 - I Walk Alone (The Darkroom Mix by Deviousnoise)
4 - I Walk Alone (Artist Version) [Video]
