= Vasiliki Kassianidou =

Cypriot archaeologist and politician (born 1967)

- Βασιλική Κασσιανίδου
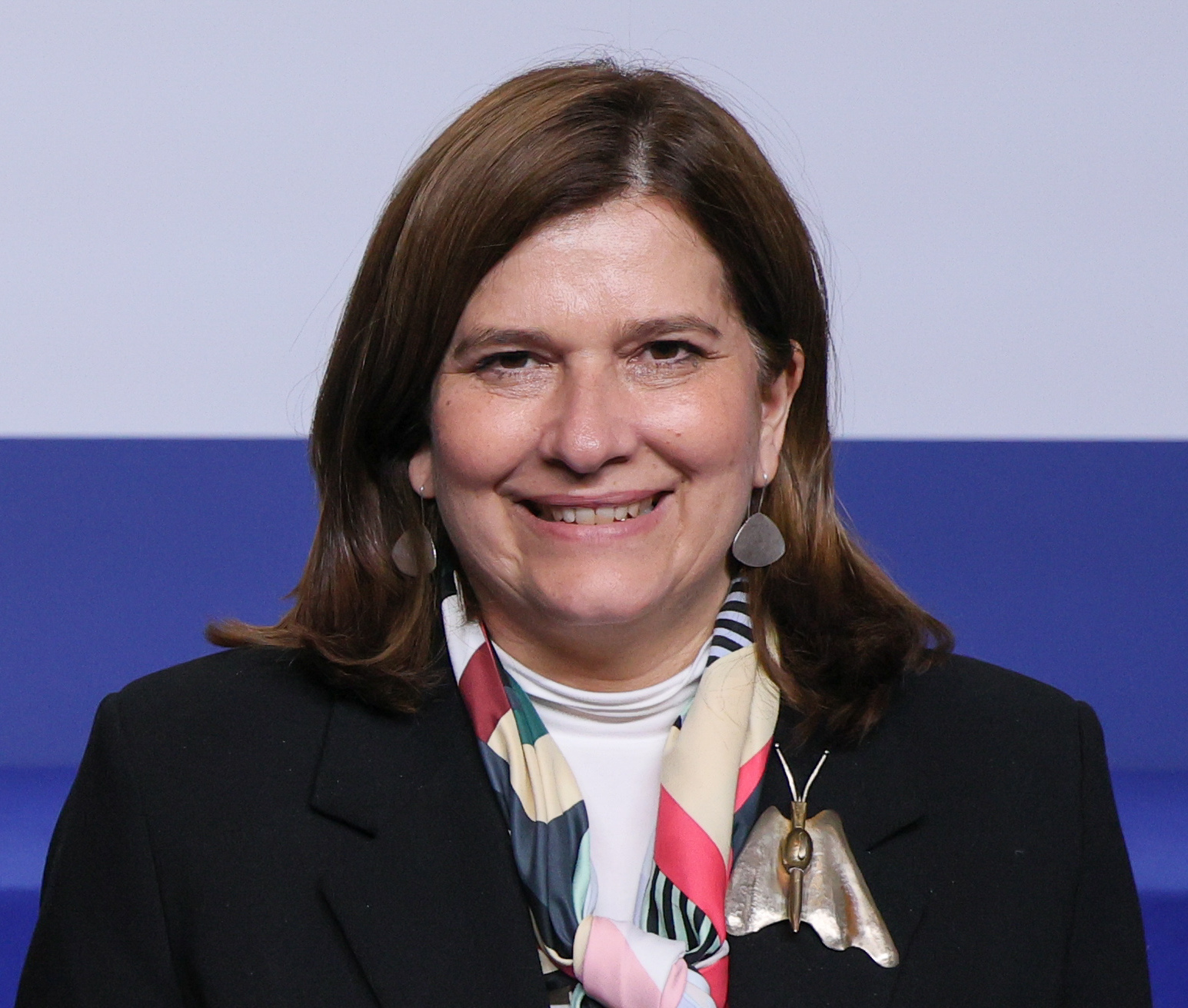
- Kassianidou in 2025

Deputy Minister of Culture
- Incumbent
- Assumed office 11 July 2023
- President: Nikos Christodoulides
- Preceded by: Michalis Hatzigiannis

Personal details
- Born: 26 October 1967 (age 58) London, England
- Spouse: George Papasavvas
- Children: 2
- Education: Bryn Mawr College (BSc); Institute of Archaeology, University College London (PhD)

Vasiliki Lina Kassianidou (Greek: Βασιλική Κασσιανίδου; born 26 October 1967) is a Cypriot archaeologist and politician. She was appointed Deputy Minister of Culture in 2023.

== Early life and education ==
Kassianidou was born in London, England and grew up in Lefkosia, Cyprus. She is the daughter of Gloria Kassianides, owner of the oldest art gallery in Cyprus.

Kassianidou studied a double major of Chemistry and Classical and Near Eastern Archaeology at Bryn Mawr College in Pennsylvania, United States, graduating with distinction in 1989. She then studied a PhD in Archaeometallurgy at the Institute of Archaeology, University College London, in London, England. Her research specialises in ancient mining in Cyprus and copper metallurgy.

== Career ==
From 1994, Kassianidou taught Environmental Archaeology and Archaeometry at the Department of History and Archaeology of the University of Cyprus (UCy). In 2022 she was elected as a Corresponding Member of the Archaeological Institute of America (AIA). In May 2023 she was elected Dean of the Faculty of Letters at UCy. From 2014 to 2023, Kassianidou was a member of the Board of Directors of the Cyprus National Commission for UNESCO.

After the resignation of Michalis Hatzigiannis, Kassianidou was appointed Deputy Minister of Culture by President Nikos Christodoulides on 11 July 2023. The Antiquities department fell under the Ministry of Culture from that month.

In office, Kassianidou has visited the Hellenic Centre and the British Museum in London and has discussed cultural cooperation opportunities with the Japanese ambassador. Over 100,000 Cypriot cultural artifacts have been digitised as part of the Digitising the Museums of Cyprus project (CADiP).

In December 2023, Kassianidou announced that Cyprus and seven other countries had "midwifery: knowledge, skills, and practices" registered on UNESCO's list of intangible culture heritage. Also that month, the federation of theatre institutions called for her to resign as Deputy Minister over arts funding.

In June 2025, an architecture booklet linked to Cyprus’ participation in the 19th International Architecture Biennale in Venice, Italy, was withdrawn after Kassianidou was referred to as a publisher of the book without her knowledge or consent.

In February 2026, Kassianidou announced mosaic conservation and upgrades to the Tombs of the Kings at the archaeological site of Nea Paphos.
