= My Winter Storm =

Studio album by Tarja Turunen
- Released: 19 November 2007
- Recorded: Grouse Lodge Studios, Westmeath, Ireland, Can del Sol, Ibiza, Spain, The Village, Los Angeles, USA, Petrax Studio, Hollola, Finland, Rudolfinum, Prague, Czech Republic, Finnvox Studios, Helsinki, Finland, Remote Control Productions, Santa Monica, USA, Fusão Estúdios, Sao Paulo, Brazil, Sound Development AG, Zurich, Switzerland, Jojo Music Studios, Stuttgart, Germany, 2006-2007
- Genre: Symphonic metal; pop rock
- Length: 60:58 (Standard edition)
- Label: Edel; Vertigo; Universal
- Producer: Daniel Presley

Tarja Turunen chronology
Henkäys ikuisuudesta (2006)	My Winter Storm (2007)	The Seer EP (2008)

Singles from My Winter Storm
- 1. "I Walk Alone" Released: 26 October 2007; 2. "Die Alive" Released: 7 March 2008; 3. "Enough" Released: 9 March 2009

Alternative cover
- Special Extended Edition

Professional ratings
Review scores
Source	Rating
AllMusic	1.5/5 stars
About.com	3/5 stars
IGN	(5.9/10)
PopMatters	4/10 stars
Spike Magazine	(mixed)
Blabbermouth	6/10 stars
Metal Storm	(7.7/10)

My Winter Storm is the second solo album by the Finnish singer Tarja Turunen, and the first to consist mainly of new and original songs specifically written by or for Turunen. The album was released by Universal Music on 19 November 2007 in Finland, on 2 January 2008 in South America and on February 26 in North America and in the United Kingdom was also released a special version limited in 300 copies.

The album was recorded with the collaboration of various artists, including cellist Martin Tillman, guitarist Kiko Loureiro and composer James Dooley, with Turunen also playing additional keyboards. The album contains several music styles including alternative rock and classical music, and it was recorded in different studios in Finland, Brazil, Ireland, USA, Spain, Switzerland, Germany and the Czech Republic.

My Winter Storm has sold Platinum in Finland and Double Platinum in Russia, and also reached Tarja's first gold disc in her entire career in the Czech Republic; the album spent two and a half months on the Official Finnish Albums Chart, reaching the highest position right during the first week, also spending four months on German Top 100, two months on Swiss Top 100 and also a full month on the Austrian Top 40, ending 2007 at 11th position on Billboard's Top 100 European albums with more than 500,000 copies sold. To promote the album, Tarja played the Storm World Tour, that took place from Berlin on November 25, 2007, to London on October 19, 2009.

== Title and concept ==
Talking about the title and the concept of "My Winter Storm", Tarja told that was inspired by the lyrics of the first single, I Walk Alone. When she entered the studio to recorded the first demo of the disc, those three words come to her head, she thought about it and starts to see the people around her as a storm: "It comes with a very powerful image when thinking about my family, the musicians, friends ... like a storm a snowstorm is a very beautiful image, in winter". In an interview, she further explained this concept: "A snowstorm can be negative for many, but very positive for me. A snowstorm has a lot of energy and also represents a synonym of my happiness, which helped me in difficult times and never let me down."

The album and the music video of "I Walk Alone" features four characters: "The Dead Boy", "The Doll", "The Phoenix" and "The Ice Queen". Tarja told that she noticed that some songs of the disc had similar themes. Realizing that, she started to create a history about them. That helped the singer to write songs and built the album. However, she reinforced that "My Winter Storm" is not a concept record, and the characters was only a fun way to make connections between the album, the artwork and the videos.

== Composition ==
"My Winter Storm" was described as a "own creation enriched with soundtrack atmosphere". That's notable in songs like "Oasis", a song that place emphasis on cinematic atmosphere, and the second single, "Die Alive" that contains an acoustic action cinema section. On the other hand, the rock contributions was also important for the disc. Tarja explained that from the beginning she knew that she wanted "a record where I would sing to rock guitars and which should sound like a soundtrack at the same time". The penultimate song from the album, "Ciarán's Well", it's a good example of this. The track was inspired by a sacred well of Ireland, has a dark tone and strong riffs, probably the heaviest music from the album.

In the end, for Tarja, "My Winter Storm" doesn't have a specific genre, but it's a combination of heavy elements, orchestra, sound of film and ambient sound. She also revealed that used her lyrical singing technique much more than in previous albums with Nightwish.

== Reception ==
The record was a successful launch, selling over 650,000 copies around the world. With the "My Winter Storm", Tarja received, for the first time in her entire career, a gold disc in Czech Republic. In Germany, Turunen also reached the gold record status, being the first Finnish solo artist to be granted with this certification. In her home country, Finland, "My Winter Storm" achieved platinum. While in Russia, the record was most successful, receiving double platinum. This was the first time that the singer received a certification from this country.

Although sales were high, reception to the album was mixed. IGN criticized the length of the disc, affirming "this record is just too long, overindulgent and pretentious to be enjoyable. It's as if we're listening to one long song, and a boring one at that". Metal Storm also complained that attribute, "saying that the metal background becomes monotonous by the end. A major danger while composing long releases." In general, the metal aspects of the album were not well received and the "Ciarán's Well" was panned.

On the other hand, Metal Storm praised the beautiful choruses, the string ensemble melodies and the mild percussion. Beyond that, the classical-based tracks were well received. "Oasis", for example, was defined by the critics as one of the best songs of the album. "The Reign", according to Blabbermouth.net, was a "captivating example of what the songstress is capable of", as well as "Boy And The Ghost" and "Our Great Divide".

== Track listings ==
No.	Title	Writer(s)	Length
1.	"Ite, Missa Est"	Anders Wollbeck; Mattias Lindblom; Harry Sommerdahl	0:27
2.	"I Walk Alone"	Wollbeck; Lindblom; Sommerdahl	3:53
3.	"Lost Northern Star"	Kiko Masbaum; Michelle Leonard; Tarja Turunen	4:22
4.	"Seeking for the Reign"	Adrian Zagoritis; Torsten Stenzel; Angela Heldmann; Turunen	0:58
5.	"The Reign"	Zagoritis; Stenzel; Heldmann; Turunen	4:07
6.	"The Escape of the Doll"	Ruud Houweling; Michiel Van Zundert	0:32
7.	"My Little Phoenix"	Houweling; Van Zundert	4:02
8.	"Boy and the Ghost"	Jessika Lundstrom; Anine Stang; Alexander Jonsson; Lindblom; Wollbeck; Turunen	4:36
9.	"Sing for Me"	Kid Crazy; Christel Sundberg; Tracy Lipp	4:16
10.	"Oasis"	Turunen	5:10
11.	"Poison"	Alice Cooper; Desmond Child; John McCurry	4:01
12.	"Our Great Divide"	Wollbeck; Hanne Sørvaag; Lindblom; Turunen	5:05
13.	"Sunset"	Zagoritis; Stenzel; Heldmann; Turunen	0:36
14.	"Damned and Divine"	Zagoritis; Stenzel; Heldmann; Turunen	4:29
15.	"Die Alive"	Wollbeck; Sørvaag; Lindblom; Turunen	4:04
16.	"Minor Heaven"	Wollbeck; Lindblom	3:53
17.	"Ciarán's Well"	Alex Scholpp; Leonard; Doug Wimbish; Turunen	3:39
18.	"Calling Grace"	Masbaum; Leonard; Turunen	3:06

Deleted Scene (as bonus on some releases)
No.	Title	Length
16.	"The Seer"	4:16

Japanese Bonus Tracks
No.	Title	Length
19.	"Ciarán's Well" (live)	3:48
20.	"Our Great Divide" (live)	5:16

Deluxe Edition Bonus Tracks
No.	Title	Length
19.	"Damned Vampire & Gothic Divine" (heavy version of 'Damned and Divine')	5:01
20.	"I Walk Alone" (Artist Version)	4:23
21.	"I Walk Alone" (In Extremo Remix)	4:31

US Deluxe Edition Bonus Tracks
No.	Title	Writer(s)	Length
19.	"I Walk Alone" (In Extremo Remix)		4:41
20.	"You Would Have Loved This" (live, Cori Connors cover)	Helen Roy Connors	4:08
21.	"Damned and Divine" (live)		5:45

Deluxe Edition DVD
No.	Title	Length
1.	"Photo Gallery"
2.	"I Walk Alone (Single Version Video)"
3.	"I Walk Alone (Artist Version Video)"
4.	"I Walk Alone (Making of the Video)"
5.	"My Winter Storm (Making of the Album)"

=== Extended Special Edition ===
My Winter Storm - Extended Special Edition was released on January 2, 2009, as a double CD, bringing The Seer EP with additional new songs "Enough"and "Wisdom of Wind", new cover art, some mixes and live tracks.

Feature Disc ("My Winter Storm" album)
No.	Title	Writer(s)	Length
1.	"Ite, Missa Est"	Anders Wollbeck; Mattias Lindblom; Harry Sommerdahl	0:27
2.	"I Walk Alone"	Wollbeck; Lindblom; Sommerdahl	3:53
3.	"Lost Northern Star"	Kiko Masbaum; Michelle Leonard; Tarja Turunen	4:22
4.	"Seeking for the Reign"	Adrian Zagoritis; Torsten Stenzel; Angela Heldmann; Turunen	0:58
5.	"The Reign"	Zagoritis; Stenzel; Heldmann; Turunen	4:07
6.	"The Escape of the Doll"	Ruud Houweling; Michiel Van Zundert	0:32
7.	"My Little Phoenix"	Houweling; Van Zundert	4:02
8.	"Boy and the Ghost"	Jessika Lundstrom; Anine Stang; Alexander Jonsson; Lindblom; Wollbeck; Turunen	4:36
9.	"Sing for Me"	Kid Crazy; Christel Sundberg; Tracy Lipp	4:16
10.	"Oasis"	Turunen	5:10
11.	"Poison"	Alice Cooper; Desmond Child; John McCurry	4:01
12.	"Our Great Divide"	Wollbeck; Hanne Sørvaag; Lindblom; Turunen	5:05
13.	"Sunset"	Zagoritis; Stenzel; Heldmann; Turunen	0:36
14.	"Damned and Divine"	Zagoritis; Stenzel; Heldmann; Turunen	4:29
15.	"Die Alive"	Wollbeck; Sørvaag; Lindblom; Turunen	4:04
16.	"The Seer (deleted scene)"		4:16
17.	"Minor Heaven"	Wollbeck; Lindblom	3:53
18.	"Ciarán's Well"	Alex Scholpp; Leonard; Doug Wimbish; Turunen	3:39
19.	"Calling Grace"	Masbaum; Leonard; Turunen	3:06

Bonus Disc ("The Seer" EP with new songs)
No.	Title	Length
1.	"Enough"
2.	"The Seer (featuring Doro Pesch)"
3.	"Lost Northern Star (Tägtgren Remix)"
4.	"Wisdom of Wind"
5.	"The Reign (Score Mix)"
6.	"Die Alive (Alternative Version)"
7.	"Boy and the Ghost" (Izumix)"
8.	"Calling Grace (Full version)"
9.	"Lost Northern Star (Ambience Sublow Mix)"
10.	"Damned and Divine" (live in Kuusankoski)"
11.	"You Would Have Loved This" (live in Kuusankoski)"
12.	"Our Great Divide (live in Kuusankoski)"
13.	"Ciarán's Well (live in Kuusankoski)"

== Personnel ==
Credits for My Winter Storm adapted from liner notes.

=== Musicians ===
Band members

- Tarja Turunen - lead and backing vocals
- Alex Scholpp - electric guitars
- Doug Wimbish - bass
- Earl Harvin - drums
- Torsten Stenzel - keyboards and programming

Additional musicians

- Martin Tillman - cello and electric cello
- Izumi Kawakatsu - piano
- Lili Haydin - violin
- Kiko Loureiro - acoustic guitars
- Czech Film Orchestra and Choir conducted by Jiří Kubík and Jan Brych
- Dana Niu - lead orchestrator
- Tea Tähtinen, Toni Turunen, Daniel Presley - backing vocals on "Poison"
- Kid Crazy - additional keyboards on "Sing for Me"
- Peter Tägtgren - lead guitar on "Lost Northern Star" (Tägtgren Remix)

=== Production ===
- Daniel Presley - producer
- James Dooley - orchestral and choir arrangements, co-producer on "Our Great Divide"
- Mel Wesson - ambient music design and electronic arrangements
- Doug Cook - recording engineer
- Dani Castelar, Noel Zancanella, Thiago Bianchi, Helge Van Dyk, Felix Gauder - additional engineers
- Milan Jilek, Cenda Kottzmann - orchestra and choir recording engineers
- Slamm Andrews - mixing
- Louie Teran - mastering
- Dirk Rudolph - cover art
- Jens Bold - photos

== Charts and sales ==
=== Weekly charts ===
Weekly chart performance for My Winter Storm
Chart (2007–2008)	Peak position
Austrian Albums (Ö3 Austria)	11
Belgian Albums (Ultratop Flanders)	78
Belgian Albums (Ultratop Wallonia)	94
Czech Albums (ČNS IFPI)	33
European Albums (Billboard)	11
Finnish Albums (Suomen virallinen lista)	1
French Albums (SNEP)	88
German Albums (Offizielle Top 100)	3
Hungarian Albums (MAHASZ)	18
Norwegian Albums (VG-lista)	37
Spanish Albums (Promusicae)	77
Swedish Albums (Sverigetopplistan)	41
Swiss Albums (Schweizer Hitparade)	15
UK Albums (OCC)	134
UK Rock & Metal Albums (OCC)	8
US Heatseekers Albums (Billboard)	46

=== Year-end charts ===
Year-end chart performance for My Winter Storm
Chart (2007)	Position
Finnish Albums (Suomen virallinen lista)	15

Sales Certifications

Region	Certification
Czech Republic (ČNS IFPI)	Gold
Finland (IFPI Finland)	Platinum
Germany (BVMI)	Gold
Russia (NFPR)	Gold
