= Mihalis (album) =

Studio album by Mihalis Hatzigiannis
- Released: August 13, 2010
- Recorded: Bell Studio; Stockholm, Sweden
- Genre: Pop
- Length: 42:45
- Labels: Universal Music Germany, We Love Music
- Producers: Jorgen Ingestrom, Bo Reimer, Henrik Wikstrom

Mihalis Hatzigiannis chronology
Kolaz (2009)	Mihalis (2010)	To Kalitero Psema (2010)

Singles from Mihalis
- 1. "You're More Than Beautiful" Released: September 16, 2009; 2. "Everyone Dance" Released: July 30, 2010

Mihalis is a studio album by Greek-Cypriot singer Mihalis Hatzigiannis. Released in Germany on August 13, 2010 on Universal Music Germany via the label We Love Music, the album marks Hatzigiannis' first English-language album and eleventh overall studio album. The album contains twelve songs, along with a bonus song available exclusively on iTunes Store. Seven of the songs are English translations of his past Greek hits. A pan-European release is planned throughout the fall.

== Background ==
Hatzigiannis first revealed his intentions of releasing an English-language album in early 2007. Initial plans were for the album to include a few of his Greek hits translated into English, and to launch the album in the United Kingdom, with a release in the United States to follow. Plans later shifted, and in 2009 Hatzigiannis signed with Universal Music Germany via We Love Music to launch his album from Germany, along with pan-European distribution via Universal Music Netherlands, an international distribution arm of Universal Music Group.

The album was mostly produced with Swedish-based Lionheart Music, an affiliate of Universal Music Sweden, which collaborates with sister company, Universal Music Greece, which is Hatzigiannis' native label.

In September 2009, Hatzigiannis released the first single from the album titled "More Than Beautiful" in Germany. The single also premiered on radio stations in Greece through Love Radio on September 16, 2009. A two track CD-Single of "More Than Beautiful" was planned to be released on April 2, 2010, although it was later cancelled.

In July 2010, Hatzigiannis released "Everyone Dance", the English version of the Greek hit "Heria Psila" with English lyrics by Rea Garvey of Reamonn. Hatzigiannis had previously collaborated with Rea Garvey and Reamonn for a performance of the song Tonight at the 2007 MAD Video Music Awards. A video for "Everyone Dance" was shot in the Aegean, and released on July 19, 2010. On July 30, 2010, Hatzigannis released "Everyone Dance" as a two track CD-Single in Germany.

The single was followed up with the released of the full-length album on August 13, 2010. The iTunes release of the album also included an exclusive bonus song titled "Kiss on the Breeze".

== Singles ==
"You're More Than Beautiful"

The first single from the album was "You're More Than Beautiful". The single was released in September 2009, while Love Radio also premiered the song in Greece on September 16, 2009. A two track CD-Single of "More Than Beautiful" was planned to be released on April 2, 2010, although it was cancelled.

"Everyone Dance"

The second single from the album is "Everyone Dance", the English version of the Greek hit "Heria Psila" (Hands in the air) with English lyrics by Rea Garvey of Reamonn; it was released in July 2010. Hatzigiannis had previously collaborated with Rea Garvey and Reamonn in the English-Greek duet "Tonight-Simera" in mid-2007. A video for "Everyone Dance" was shot in the Aegean Sea, and released on July 19, 2010. On July 30, 2010, Hatzigannis released "Everyone Dance" as a two track CD-Single in Germany. The song was also included on the compilation "Ballerman Hits 2010" which peaked at number 5 in Switzerland and number 4 in Austria. The song debut at number 95 on Germany's official Top 100 Singles Chart.

== Reception ==
Professional ratings
Review scores
Source	Rating
Die Welt	2/5 stars
LetMeEntertainYou.de	3/5 stars
Monsters and Critics	(Unfavorable)
Mbeat Magazine	7/10 stars

Critical reaction to Mihalis was mixed. Sabine Metzger of Monsters and Critics called the album dull and outdated. She found that the album proves that there are still strong differences between what is considered current music across the nations of the EU. She went on to say, however, that since the album includes many of his past hits translated into English, it makes it difficult to bring them up to date. She also felt that some of the dance songs on the album could be compared to hits by Enrique Iglesias from 2000. Die Welt gave the album two out of five stars, questioning whether a singer could become an international star if launched from Germany. LetMeEntertainYou.de criticized the terribly placed touch of Greek instruments in some songs, saying that it seems Hatzigiannis wants to remind listeners of his origin in spite of the English lyrics. They further went on to state that although the album is primarily written and produced by Scandinavian songwriters, they still somehow seem already known. Despite these concerns, LetMeEntertainYou.de went on to say that Hatzigiannis' inescapable accent and love songs like "One in a Million" might charm women more. Further, they praised his voice, calling it strong, also stating that the album's attractive appearance and Hatzigiannis' "southern charm" makes the album stand out despite other releases on the German charts. Mbeat Magazine stated that Hatzigiannis seemed like he could keep up in the mainstream and international radio world.

== Release and promotion ==
Prior to the album's release, Universal Music Germany released a promotional television trailer of Hatzigiannis, as well as launching a German-language website. Both the TV commercial and the website emphasized Hatzigiannis' Greek sales and platinum albums. An exclusive bonus song was also included with the purchase of the album from the iTunes Store. Hatzigiannis will be appearing on morning show "Morgenmagazin" on ARD on August 20, 2010 as well as special morning show "Fernsehgarten" on ZDF on August 22, 2010 for promotion of his album. The album was officially released in Greece and Cyprus on September 28, 2010.

== Track listing ==
No.	Title	Writer(s)	Length
1.	"You're More Than Beautiful"	Bobby Ljunggren, Oscar Holter, Kristian Lagerström	4:23
2.	"I Raise My Hands"	Bobby Ljunggren, Fredrik Kempe	3:24
3.	"Favourite Mistake"	Mihalis Hatzigiannis, Adrian "Zag" Zagoritis, Rob Davis	3:52
4.	"Do You Really Wanna Love"	Bobby Ljunggren, Thomas G:son, Pontus Hagberg	2:55
5.	"Everyone Dance"	Mihalis Hatzigiannis, Nikos Moraitis, Rea Garvey	3:34
6.	"Suddenly"	Mihalis Hatzigiannis, Nikos Moraitis, Adrian Zagoritis	4:27
7.	"One in a Million"	Mihalis Hatzigiannis, Eleana Vrachali, Adrian Zagoritis	3:34
8.	"In the Middle of the Night"	Bobby Ljunggren, Henrik Wikström, Kristian Lagerström	3:46
9.	"Heart Surrender"	Mihalis Hatzigiannis, Nikos Moraitis, Adrian Zagoritis	3:15
10.	"Eyes of a Sinner"	Mihalis Hatzigiannis, Adrian Zagoritis, Eleana Vrachali	2:44
11.	"Let's Call It Love"	Bobby Ljunggren, Niklas Edberger, Kristian Lagerström, Henrik Wikström	3:08
12.	"Now That You're Gone"	Mihalis Hatzigiannis, Adrian Zagoritis, Eleana Vrachali	3:31

iTunes Bonus track
No.	Title	Writer(s)	Length
13.	"Kiss on the Breeze"	Mihalis Hatzigiannis, Adrian Zagoritis, Eleana Vrachali	3:26

== Release history ==
Region	Date	Label	Format
Austria	August 13, 2010	Universal Music	CD, Digital download
Germany	August 13, 2010	Universal Music, We Love Music	CD, Digital download
Switzerland	August 13, 2010	Universal Music	CD, Digital download
Greece	August 13, 2010	Universal Music	Digital download
Greece	September 28, 2010	Universal Music	CD
Cyprus	September 28, 2010	Universal Music	CD
