= Ola Mou Ta Mystika =

Ola Mou Ta Mystika Όλα Μου Τα Μυστικα

Studio album by Glykeria
- Released: March 1990
- Genre: Modern Laika
- Language: Greek
- Label: WEA
- Producer: Stelios Fotiadis

Glykeria chronology
Me Panselino (1987)	Ola Mou Ta Mystika; Όλα Μου Τα Μυστικα (1990)	Ximerose (1991)

Ola Mou Ta Mistika (Greek: Όλα Μου Τα Μυστικα; English: All my secrets) is a studio album by Greek singer Glykeria. It was released in March 1990 by WEA Greece and was her first release with the contract. It is composed by Stelios Fotiadis and certified Gold in Greece.

== Track list ==
1. "Erotas Ine I Etia" (Love is the reason) – 3:16
2. "Rixe Ouiski" (Pour some whisky) – 2:31
3. "Arnoume" (I deny) – 3:06
4. "Hiliades Yati" (A thousand whys) – 3:55
5. "Magepses Ti Nihta" (You cast spells on the night) – 3:55
6. "Ine To Kathe Sou Fili" (It's every kiss of yours) – 4:04
7. "Kane Kati" (Do something) – 4:36
8. "San Epivatis" (Like a passenger) – 3:18
9. "Ke Epimemame" (And we insisted) – 3:50
10. "Ora Miden" (Zero time) – 2:54
11. "Horis Tavtotita" (Without identity) – 2:54
12. "Kimisou Moro Mou" (Sleep my honey) – 2:18
13. "Stou Fengariou Tin Agkalia" (In the moon's hug) – 2:58 †
14. "Tote Moro Mou" (Then my honey) – 2:52 †
15. "Mi Mou Les" (Don't tell me) – 3:16 †
16. "Ki Olo Fonazo" (I'm shouting) – 4:08 †
17. "Fige" (Go away) – 3:36 †

† Released only on the CD issue of the album.
