= Ximerose =

Ximerose Ξημέρωσε

Studio album by Glykeria
- Released: 1991
- Genre: Modern Laika
- Language: Greek
- Label: WEA
- Producer: Christos Nikolopoulos, Lefteris Papadopoulos

Glykeria chronology
| Ola Mou Ta Mystika (1990) | Ximerose; Ξημέρωσε (1991) | I Hora Ton Thavmaton (1992) |

Ximerose (Greek: Ξημέρωσε; English: It has dawned) is a studio album by Greek artist Glykeria. It was released in 1991 by the WEA Greece and is composed by Christos Nikolopoulos and Lefteris Papadopoulos.

== Track listing ==
1. "Tha Pethano Apo Erota" (I will die from love) – 3:55
2. "Gennieme Mia" (Born once) – 4:13
3. "Einai I Agapi Mou Trelli" (My love is crazy) – 3:19
4. "Se Latrevo" (I love you very much) – 3:46
5. "Dio Kai Dio" (Two and two) – 2:33
6. "Ximerose" (It has dawned) – 3:25
7. "Fevgo Fevgo" (I'm leaving, I'm leaving) – 2:36
8. "Ola" (Everything) – 3:31
9. "Kathotane Se Ekeino To Trapezi" (He was sitting on that table) – 3:50
10. "Ase Na Pethano" (Let me die) – 3:27
11. "Pikres" (Bitterness) – 3:30
12. "Ekpliktika Matia" (Amazing eyes) – 3:14
13. "Oli Mou I Zoi" (All my life) – 4:06
