= I Hora Ton Thavmaton =

I Hora Ton Thavmaton Η Χώρα Των Θαυμάτων

Studio album by Glykeria
- Released: 1992
- Genre: Modern Laika
- Language: Greek
- Label: WEA
- Producer: Stelios Fotiadis

Glykeria chronology
Ximerose (1991)	I Hora Ton Thavmaton; Η Χώρα Των Θαυμάτων (1992)	Se Mia Schedia (1994)

Singles from I Hora Ton Thavmaton
- 1. "Gia Tin Ellada" Released: 1992; 2. "Fisa Vardari Mou" Released: 1992; 3. "Mehri Na Vroume Ourano" Released: 1992

I Hora Ton Thavmaton (Greek: Η Χώρα Των Θαυμάτων; English: The Land Of Miracles) is a studio album by Greek artist Glykeria. It was released in 1992 by the WEA Greece.

== Track listing ==
1. "Kai Oti Po" (Anything I say) – 3:26
2. "Fisa Vardari Mou" – 2:42
3. "Ego Kai O Ponos Mou" (Me and my pain) – 3:28
4. "Leili Leili" – 3:01
5. "Mehri Na Vroume Ourano" (Until we find the skies) – 3:14
6. "Pou Pas Aliki" (Where are you going Aliki) – 5:36
7. "Gia Tin Ellada" (For Greece) – 3:50
8. "Otan Vrehei Se Thimamai" (When it rains I remember you) – 3:52
9. "San Vanilia" (Like vanilla) – 3:18
10. "Ksafnika Mia Vradia" (Suddenly one evening) – 3:08
11. "12 Theoi" (12 Gods) – 4:00
12. "Klefta Klefta" (Sly sly) – 3:36
13. "Gia Tin Ellada" (For Greece) [Extended Version] – 4:45

== Music videos ==
1. "Gia Tin Ellada"
2. "Fisa Vardari Mou"
3. "Mehri Na Vroume Ourano
4. "Ego ki o ponos mou"
