= I Glykeria Tragoudai Antoni Vardi =

I Glykeria Tragoudai Antoni Vardi Η Γλυκερία Τραγουδάει Αντώνη Βαρδή

Studio album by Glykeria
- Released: 1996
- Genre: Modern Laika
- Language: Greek
- Label: Sony Music Greece/Columbia
- Producer: Antonis Vardis

Glykeria chronology
Se Mia Schedia (1994)	I Glykeria Tragoudai Antoni Vardi; Η Γλυκερία Τραγουδάει Αντώνη Βαρδή (1996)	Maska (1998)

Singles from Tha M'agapiseis
- 1. "Monahikes Ginaikes" Released: 1996; 2. "Na Xanartheis" Released: 1996; 3. "Eklege Mazi" Released: 1996

I Glykeria Tragoudai Antoni Vardi (Greek: Η Γλυκερία Τραγουδάει Αντώνη Βαρδή; English: Glykeria sings Antonis Vardis) is a studio album by Greek artist Glykeria released in 1996 by Sony Music Greece. It was her first release on her 10-year contract with the company. The whole album is composed by Antonis Vardis, a famous Greek singer-songwriter and composer.

== Track listing ==
1. "Eklege Mazi" (Crying with...) – 4:26
2. "Tha M'agapiseis" (Will you love me) – 3:29
3. "Prin Mou Figeis Ksana" (Before you leave me again) – 3:48
4. "Giname Kseni" (We've become strangers) – 4:53
5. "Den Einai Mono" (That's not all) – 3:55
6. "Kai Anigo To Parathiro" (And I open the window) – 4:12
7. "Monahikes Ginaikes" (Lonely women) – 6:08
8. "Me Hriso Vammeno Fridi" (With a golden dyed fringe) – 4:34
9. "Na Xanartheis" (Come back) – 4:44
10. "Stin Ellada Me Dalgkades" – 3:40
11. "Ta Parathiria Tou Trellou" (The crazed's windows) – 4:12
12. "Ego Eimai Ta Paraloga" – 3:15
13. "Monahikes Ginaikes" (Lonely woman) (Instrumental) – 1:56
