= Maska (album) =

Maska Μάσκα

Studio album by Glykeria
- Released: July 13, 1998
- Genre: Modern Laika, Pop
- Language: Greek
- Label: Sony Music Greece/Columbia
- Producer: Stelios Fotiadis

Glykeria chronology
I Glykeria Tragoudai Antoni Vardi (1996)	Maska; Μάσκα (1998)	Aniksi (2004)

Singles from Maska
- 1. "Anapnoi Anatoli" Released: January 1998; 2. "Agapi Hioni" Released: 1998; 3. "Hathikame" Released: 1998; 4. "Maska" Released: 1998; 5. "Mia Ginaika" Released: 1998; 6. "Pantou" Released: 1998

Maska (Greek: Μάσκα; English: Mask) is a successful studio album by Greek artist Glykeria. It was released in early 1998 by Sony Music Greece and comprises the previous single Anapnoi Anatoli. The album was certified Gold by IFPI Greece. The album also includes three well-known collaborations including internationally renowned Natasha Atlas and Pashalis Terzis.

It received a three-star rating from AllMusic, which described it as "an engaging collection of contemporary and traditional Greek songs as performed by Glykeria, one of the most popular vocalists in Greece."

== Track listing ==
No.	Title	Length
1.	"Mia Ginaika" (One woman)	4:16
2.	"Pantou" (Everywhere)	3:57
3.	"Anapnoi Anatoli" (Breaths from the east)	4:00
4.	"Anna" (Anna)	4:46
5.	"Agapi Hioni (feat. Natasha Atlas)" (Love as snow)	4:36
6.	"Efiges Kai Eisai Akoma Edo" (You've gone and you're still here)	4:02
7.	"Hathikame (feat. Pashalis Terzis)" (We're lost)	4:12
8.	"Pire Na Vradiazei" (Its getting late)	3:50
9.	"Giftisa Psihi Mou" (My soul is a gyps)	4:03
10.	"S'Afto To Galaksia" (In this galaxy)	3:57
11.	"Agapes Mou" (My loves)	4:07
12.	"Feggarades Stis Kiklades" (The moon on the Cyclades)	4:01
13.	"Ti Na Ftei" (Whose at fault)	3:59
14.	"Na Paroume Fotia" (We are going to be set alight)	3:47
15.	"Fos I Agapi Sou" (Your love is like light)	3:30
16.	"Maska" (Mask)	4:58

== Chart performance ==
Maska was a successful album in Cyprus and Greece. The album was certified Gold in Greece within four months of its release.
