= Filoi Kai Ehthroi =

Album by Michalis Hatzigiannis

Studio album by Mihalis Hatzigiannis
- Released: 6 December 2006; 15 June 2007 (Special Edition)
- Recorded: 2005–2006
- Genres: Pop, Modern Laïka, Dance
- Length: 53:10 (Original Edition); 69:37 (Special Edition)
- Labels: Universal Music Greece, M2
- Producer: Mihalis Hatzigiannis (M2)

Mihalis Hatzigiannis chronology
Live (2005)	Filoi Kai Ehthroi (2006)	Zontana Sto Likavitto (2007)

Singles from Filoi Kai Ehthroi
- 1. "Ola I Tipota"; 2. "Na Eisai Ekei"; 3. "Heria Psila"; 4. "An Den Kitazo Esena"; 5. "Tonight-Simera"; 6. "Pio Poli"

Filoi Kai Ehthroi is the fourth album by Greek-Cypriot singer-songwriter Mihalis Hatzigiannis, released by Universal Music Greece under his own vanity label M2 on 6 December 2006 in Greece and Cyprus. Filoi Ki Ehthri reached number one on Greek and Cypriot charts where it remained for a considerable time achieving a 4× Platinum certification. The main sponsor is Conn-x powered by OTE. It was re-released as a "special edition" packed with Hatzigiannis's CD single "Pio Poli."

== Track listing ==
Standard Edition track list

1. "Na Eisai Ekei"
2. "Filoi Kai Ehthroi"
3. "Heria Psila"
4. "Epetios"
5. "An Den Kitazo Esena"
6. "Pige Tris"
7. "Esthimata"
8. "Ola I Tipota"
9. "Pies"
10. "Esi"
11. "Apo Party Se Party"
12. "Omorfi Mera"
13. "Na Gyriseis Piso"
14. "Opos Tha Fevgis"

"Filoi Kai Ehthroi New Edition bonus tracks"

1. "Tonight-Simera" (duet with Reamonn)
2. "Pio Poli"
3. "Heria Psila" (Moscow electro mix)
4. "Pio Poli" (Passion mix)

== Singles and music videos ==
The following singles were released to radio stations and made into music videos:

"Ola I Tipota"

"Ola I Tipota" was released as the album's lead single during the second quarter of 2006. The song had huge success on Greek radio stations and also topped the Greek Singles Chart. The single gained a platinum certification and a music video for the song premiered on MAD TV. Hatzigiannis won three awards for the song including those for the "Best pop video-clip", the "Best video-clip of a male artist", the "Best video-clip of the year" and he won an Arion Award in 2007 for the "Best pop Song Of The Year (Ola I Tipota)".

"Na Eisai Ekei"

"Na Eisai Ekei" was the second promotional song of the album which was released a little while before the album's release. The song is differs from Hatzigiannis genre having a folk beat with lyrics of deep feeling. Also a music video for the song was aired made. Hatzigiannis won an Arion Award in 2007 for the song, the "Best laiko song of The Year".

"Heria Psila"

"Heria Psila" was the third promotional song of the album which was released in the first half of the summer and it dominated radio stations all over Greece for most of the summer. Heria Psila is a pop/dance/upbeat song that led to a black-and-white music video which. The clip shows Hatzigiannis and his company dancing with their hands up, the meaning of the title. Due to the success of the song, Hatzigiannis won another Arion Award in 2007 for "Best Pop Singer of The Year".

"An Den Kitazo Esena"'

"An Den Kitazo Esena" is a pop/rock song and was the last single from the album which was released in May 2007. A music video for this song shows Hatzigiannis walking on the street and singing about his girlfriend.

"Tonight-Simera"

"Tonight-Simera", a duet with Reamonn was the fifth single and available with the album's special edition.

"Pio Poli"

"Pio Poli", first released as a CD single, was the sixth and final single from the album. The four bonus tracks of Filoi Ki Ehthri Special Edition were originally available on the CD single, which certified platinum.

== Re-release Special Edition ==
Because of the success of the album on the charts, a new edition of the album was released, reaching number 1 again on Greek and Cypriot. On Cypriot charts the album is currently active in the top 3. The album contains all the songs from the standard edition plus four new songs.

== Chart performance ==
In 2007, the album had reached 3× platinum status. In 2008, the album reentered the Greek charts and was officially certified 4× platinum by the IFPI with confirmed sales of over 120,000 copies sold. Sales thresholds for certifications have varied over the decades, although traditionally a gold record was awarded for 20,000 copies and platinum for 40,000. However, as of 2006, the year the album was released, thresholds have been reduced to 15,000 for a gold certification and 30,000 for platinum, meaning that the album reached 4× Platinum at 120,000 copies instead of 160,000. This means that although this is Hatzigiannis' highest-certified album to date, the sales did not exceed that of his previous studio album, Akatallili Skini.

Chart	Providers	Peak position	Weeks On Charts	Certification	Sales
Greek Albums Chart	IFPI	1	55	4× Platinum	120,000+
Cypriot Album Chart	All Records Top 20	1	49	3× Platinum	–

== See also ==
- Mihalis Hatzigiannis
- Michalis Hatzigiannis discography
