= Aniksi =

Aniksi Άνοιξη

Studio album by Glykeria
- Released: May 5, 2004
- Genres: Modern Laika, Pop
- Language: Greek
- Label: Sony Music Greece/Akti
- Producer: Stelios Fotiadis

Glykeria chronology
Maska (1998)	Aniksi; Άνοιξη (2004)	Vrohi Ton Asterion (2006)

Singles from Aniksi
- 1. "Ki Olo Petao" Released: 2004; 2. "Ta Apogevmata T'Adeia" Released: 2004; 3. "Oti Agapo Einai Diko Sou" Released: 2004

Aniksi (Greek: Άνοιξη; English: Springtime) is a successful studio album by Greek artist Glykeria. It was released in mid-2004 by Sony Music Greece. The album was certified Gold by IFPI Greece.

The album also includes several well-known collaborations including Kitrina Podilata, Antonis Vardis and Dimirtis Zervoudakis.

== Track listing ==
No.	Title	Lyrics	Music	Length
1.	"O, ti Agapo Einai Diko Sou" (Everything I love is yours)	C.Germenis	G.Kalpouzos	4:06
2.	"Mia Pikra" (A bitterness)	K.Stratigopoulos	K.Stratigopoulos	4:16
3.	"Ki Olo Petao" (Always flying)	S.Fotiadis	S.Fotiadis	4:05
4.	"Gia Hari Sou" (For your sake)	P.Pelelis	I.Antonopoulou	4:38
5.	"Zitima Agapis" (Matter of love)	K.Karagiannis	A.Athanasiou	3:32
6.	"San Aspromavri Tenia" (Like a black-and-white movie)	S.Fotiadis	S.Fotiadis	4:27
7.	"Ta Apogevmata T'Adeia" (On the empty afternoons)	G.Sarris	G.Sarris	3:29
8.	"Hanomai Pali" (I'm lost again)	G.Sarris	G.Sarris	3:13
9.	"Den Eho Pia Dikaioma" (No longer have the right)	A.Vardis	A.Vardis	3:54
10.	"Ela San To Tzivaeri" (Come as the tzivaeri)	V.Kazoulis	V.Kazoulis	3:33
11.	"Aniksi" (Spring)	T.Kontonias	T.Kontonias	4:21
12.	"Dromo Allakse O Aeras" (The wind has changed course)	S.Malamas	F.Lambridi	3:07
13.	"Dihos Mahi" (Without a fight)	M.Koumpios	M.Bourboulis	3:22
14.	"To Feggari Sti Taratsa" (The moon on the roof)	P.Thalassinos	Z.Panagiotopoulou	3:16
15.	"Varia Pota, Varia Tsigara" (Heavy drinking, heavy smoking)	S.Papapostolou	S.Papapostolou	3:48
16.	"Ena" (One)	C.Mouratoglou	C.Mouratoglou	5:04

== Chart performance ==
Aniksi was a successful album in Cyprus and Greece. However, the album was only certified Gold in Greece over 2 years after its release.

Chart	Date	Certification
Greek Albums Chart	23/10/2006	Gold
Cypriot Album Chart	23/10/2006	Gold
