= Michalis Hatzigiannis =

Greek Cypriot singer (born 1978)

Michalis Hatzigiannis Μιχάλης Χατζηγιάννης
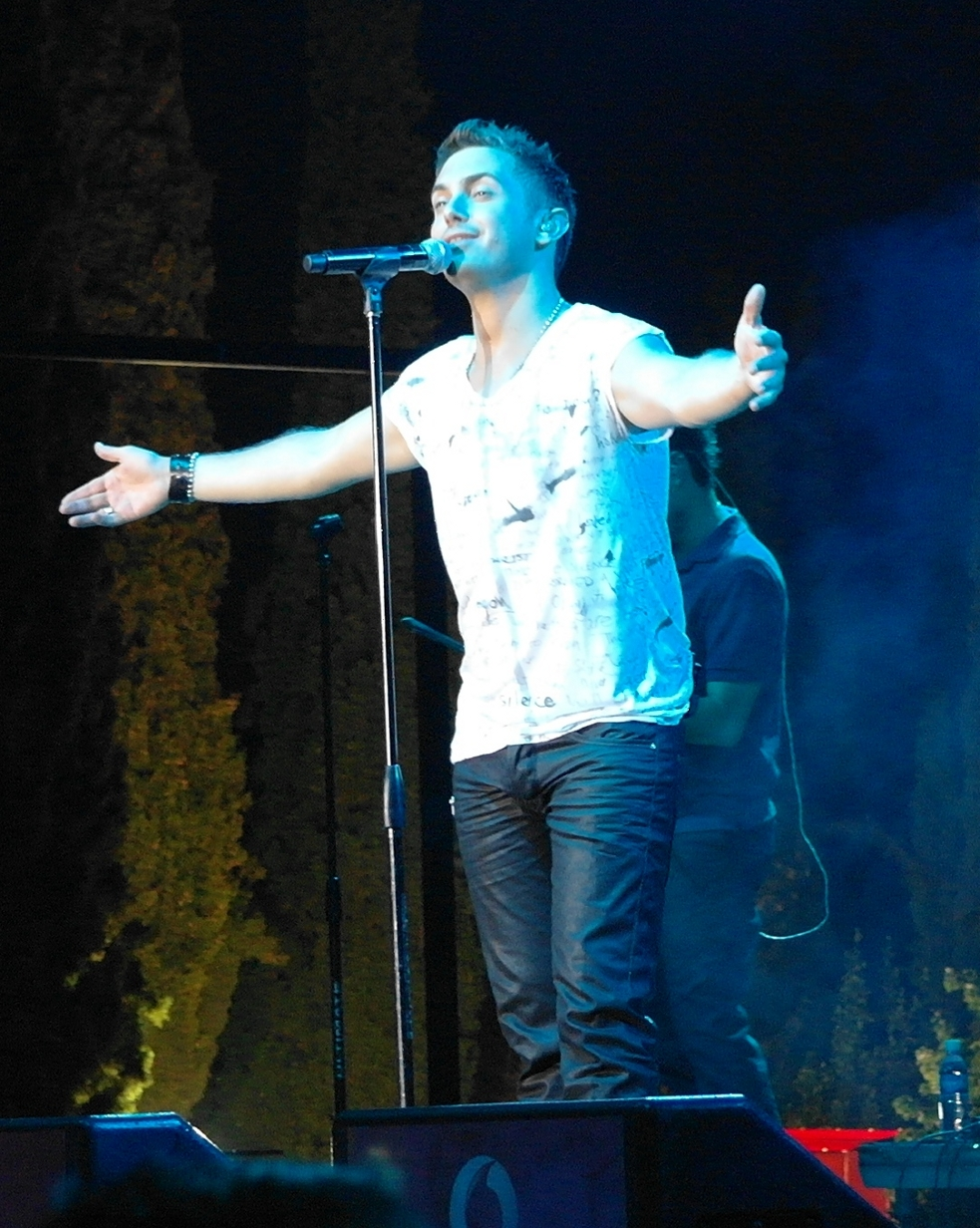
- Hatzigiannis performing in 2011

Background information
- Born: November 5, 1978 (age 47); Nicosia, Cyprus
- Origin: Kyrenia, Cyprus
- Genres: Pop; pop rock; laïko; éntekhno
- Occupations: Singer, composer, executive producer
- Instruments: Vocals, guitars, piano, keyboard, laouto
- Years active: 1995–present
- Labels: RCA; Mercury; M2; Cobalt Music; Heaven Music

Deputy Minister of Culture
- In office March 1, 2023 – July 11, 2023
- President: Nikos Christodoulides
- Preceded by: Yiannis Toumazis
- Succeeded by: Vasiliki Kassianidou

Michalis Hatzigiannis (Greek: Μιχάλης Χατζηγιάννης; born 5 November 1978) is a Greek Cypriot singer. He served as the Deputy Minister of Culture for Cyprus under President Christodoulides, from March 1, 2023 until July 11, 2023.

From 2000 to 2010 he received over 30 sales certifications in Greece, making him one of the most successful artists of the decade. He is also known for representing Cyprus in the Eurovision Song Contest in 1998. In 2010, he released his first English-language album. In 2010, Forbes listed him as the most popular Cypriot male singer in Cyprus and 22nd most powerful and influential celebrity in Greece and the fifth highest-ranked singer.

== Early life and education ==
Hatzigiannis was born in Nicosia on 5 November 1978, to his parent, Giannis and Rena. He also had one older sister, Melina. He is a graduate of the Cyprus Music Academy at London's Royal Academy of Music, with a degree in piano, guitar, and music theory.

== Musical career ==
=== 1996–2002: Beginnings, Eurovision Song Contest, and first albums ===
When Hatzigiannis was 18, he participated in a song contest in Cyprus, where he won the first prize. He later participated in the Laiki Bank Song Contest with the song "I Diki Mou Istoria", written by Andreas Gerolemou, and won first prize. In 1995, he participated in the Cypriot National Final for the Eurovision Song Contest 1995 with two songs, "Filise Me" (written by Andreas Gerolemou) and "To Gramma" (written by Leonidas Malenis). The first song came in 3rd place and the latter in second place. That year Alex Panagi won the preselection with the song "Sti Fotia". Michalis started his career in Cyprus with three records that all went platinum: "Senario", "O Mihalis Hatzigiannis Tragouda Doro Georgiadi" and "Epafi". He also participated in a musical production in Cyprus called "Pygmalion" in addition to also performing a number of concerts in major city tour in Cyprus titled "Mixalis Xatzigiannis, Andreas Gerolemou".

In May 1998, he represented Cyprus in the Eurovision Song Contest. He performed the song "Γένεσις" (Genesis), a composition of his own and finished 11th.

Upon arriving in Athens, Greece he collaborated with the composer Giorgos Hatzinasios and with poet and lyricist Michalis Bourboulis to create the CD single "Aggigma Psychis" (Touch of soul) which was released in December 1998 by BMG Greece. The album contained songs to the ANT1 TV series bearing the same title, including the hit singles "Aggigma Psychis" and "To Soma pou Zitas" (The body you seek). The album was certified platinum.

In March 2000, Hatzigiannis released his debut album in Greece "Paraxeni Giorti" (Odd Celebration). Many renowned composers and lyricists collaborated for this album and produced some of the biggest hits of that year. The song "Mono Sta Onira" (Only in Dreams) stayed at the top of the Greek radio charts for several weeks. Two other songs from the album, title track "Paraxeni Giorti" and "Ke Tha Hatho" had similar success. The album became double-platinum and was a career landmark for the young singer-songwriter in the Greek music scene. In November, he started to perform live shows in Athens.

Early in 2001 he released the CD single "Den Eho Hrono" (I have no time). It soon topped the charts and went platinum. In the summer, he toured Greece for the first time. Later that year he appeared live with Greek singer Haris Alexiou to great reviews. In the spring of 2002 he released his second solo album "Krifo Fili" (Secret kiss), which has settled at 3× platinum. This album contains a series of big hits such as "Eisai Edo" (You are here), "To S' Agapo" (The "I love you"), "Horis Anapnoi" (Breathless), "I Ekdromi" (The excursion), and "Kapnos" .This album established him as one of the most successful singer-songwriters and promising performers in the Greek music scene. In the summer of 2002 he toured Greece again with even greater success. And in winter he shared the same stage with another Greek music icon, singer Dimitra Galani. Michalis Hatzigiannis sang at the grand opening at Souvlaki Bar in Centropolis, Laval.

=== 2003–2005: "Monos Mou" and Akatallili Skini ===
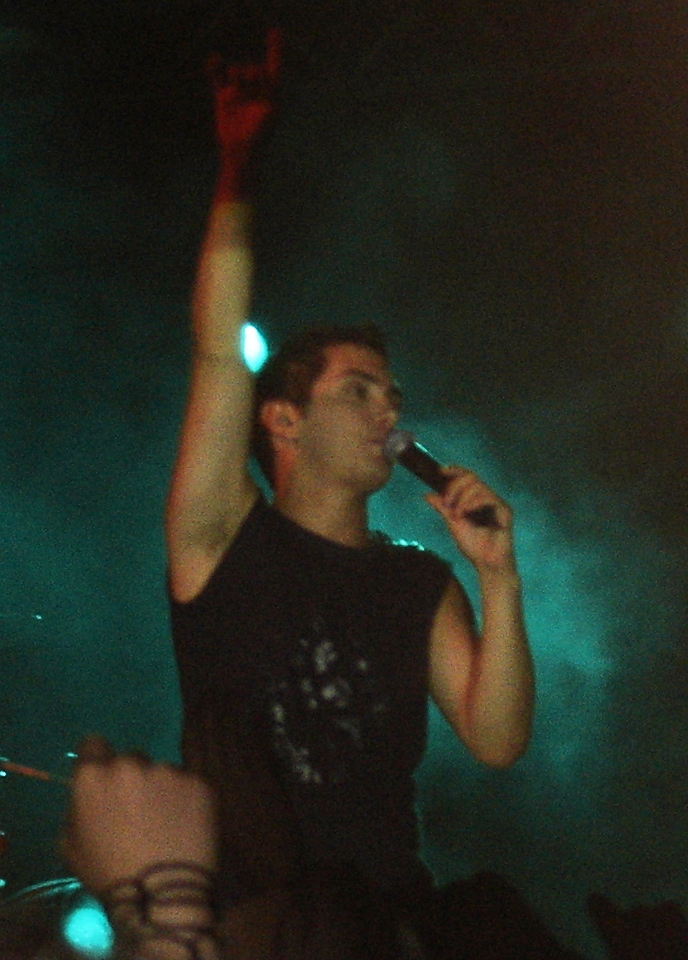
Hatzigiannis during a concert in Katerini on 13 July 2005.

In 2003, he released the 3× platinum five song EP "Monos Mou" (By myself). The single "An Mou Tilefonouses" (If You'd Called) became a hit and the demand for airplay kept growing for months. The song remains one of the most popular Greek ballads of late. In the summer he toured Greece, performing 63 sold-out shows.

He received three awards from the IFPI's annual Greek Arion Awards in 2003, followed by another four awards in 2004, including the award for Best Male Performer of the Year.

In April 2004, he released his third solo album, Akatallili Skini (Unsuitable scene), which increased his popularity in the Greek music scene. On 30 April 2004, he represented Cyprus at the official EU enlargement ceremony which took place in Warsaw to mark the accession of ten new countries into the European Union.

In the summer of 2004, he toured Greece and sang at the closing ceremony of the Olympic Games in Athens. In winter he made about 100 appearances in Athens and Thessaloniki with Paschalis Terzis.

In the summer of 2005, he toured Greece once again ending in September at Lycabettus Theatre, Mount Lycabettus, Athens with two sold out, recorded, concerts. In October he travelled to Australia for the first time and had one concert in Melbourne. In 3 November he started performing with Antonis Remos, at Athinon Arena in Athens until 26 March 2006.

=== 2006–2008: Filoi Kai Ekthri and 7 ===
In March 2006 he released his first live album taken from the recorded concerts in Lycabettus with three new songs "De Fevgo" (I'm not leaving), "Den Eimai Edo Gia Kanena" (I'm not here for anyone) and "Miazoume" (We're alike), all becoming hits. The live album also contained a DVD with photographs of scenes from the concerts and backstage. Later in April, he toured Canada and the US with George Dalaras and in May he went to Thessaloniki where he appeared with Natasa Theodoridou. In the summer he toured Greece performing 50 sold-out concerts. In August he released a single, "Ola I Tipota" (All or nothing).

In December 2006 he released his fourth studio album, "Filoi Kai Ehthri" (Friends and foes) with some many hit singles, including "Na Eisai Ekei" (To be there), "Aisthimata" (Feelings), "Heria Psila" (Hands High). On 15 December he began performing at Vox music hall in Athens.

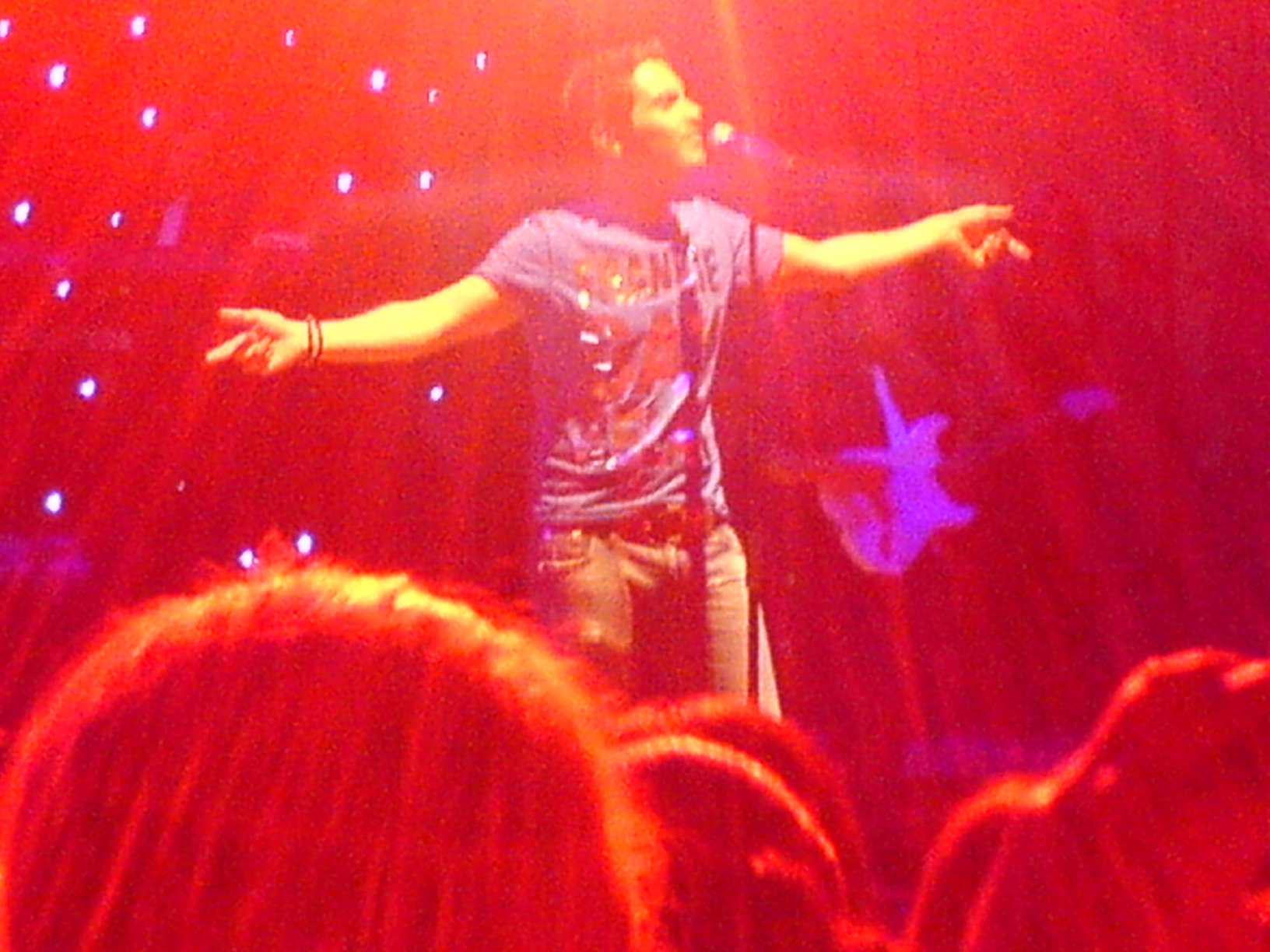
Hatzigiannis during a concert in Stuttgart on 3 November 2007

In March 2007 he collaborated with German Rock band, Reamonn and released a cover duet with the band of their hit "Tonight-Simera", a half English and half Greek lyric version of the song with Greek lyrics by Eleana Vrahali. The song is included in Reamonn's re-release of "Wish" and in "Filoi Kai Ehthri". Later in June he released the CD single "Pio Poli" (Much More), including the title track and a remix by Passion, the duet "Tonight" and "Heria Psila" (Moscow Electromix). He also embarked on another summer tour in Greece, after his appearances in Vox ending in May. In October and November he toured internationally by staging concerts in Germany, Netherlands, Switzerland and Belgium. In December he released his second live album, "Zontana Sto Likavitto" (Live at Lycabettus) which went platinum in the first week of release. He also commenced another winter season at Vox, this time alongside Glykeria.

Michalis Hatzigiannis was scheduled to tour North America in May 2008 with performances in various cities throughout the United States and Canada, but was unable to complete the whole tour due to problems with the US Government and the concert promoters Asteria Productions and Greek Chicago. However, concerts in Chicago, Montreal, New York and Toronto went underway as scheduled. On 30 September 2008, Hatzigiannis released a CD single titled "Emeis I Dio San Ena" (Us two as one) and served as a lead single for the upcoming album. The single was once again used as part of the new OTE summer campaign, this time in tribute to pianist Madra Mandicencio, an inspiration from Hatzigiannis' childhood. Hatztigiannis released his seventh studio album titled 7 on 29 October 2008. The album reached seven times Platinum.

=== 2009–present: Kolaz, Mihalis, To Kalytero Psema, Tharros I Alitheia, I Agapi Dinamoni, Erotas Agathi and Terra Incognita ===
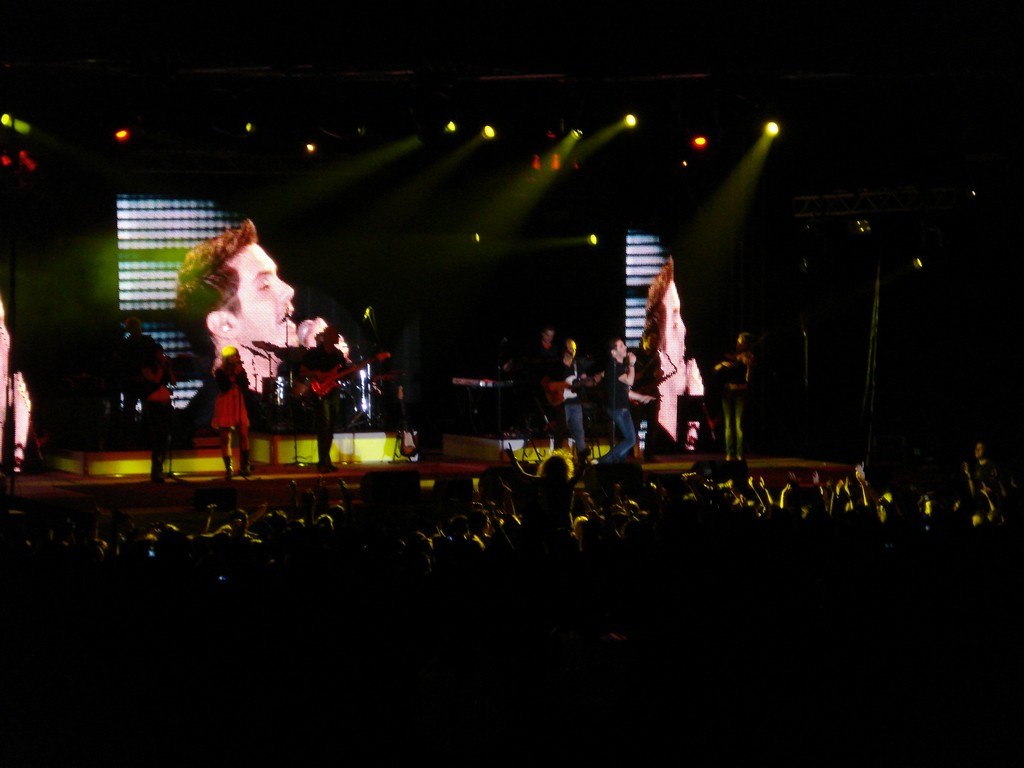
Hatzigiannis during a concert in 2009

In November 2009, 7 was included as a bonus when purchasing the newspaper Real News. This version of the album included a new bonus song titled "Kati Leipi" (Something is missing), which was later released to radio stations. In late November 2009, Hatzigiannis will release his 8th studio album titled Kolaz (collage). The album will feature covers of popular songs by Mimmis Plesas, Marios Tokas, and Antonis Vardis to name a few. The first single from the album will be titled "Anna" and is a cover of a Kostas Karalis song. The album was later certified 4× platinum.

In mid-2009, Hatzigiannis recorded his first English single titled "More Than Beautiful" in Germany under an affiliation with We Love Music/Universal Music Germany. The single premiered on radio stations in Greece on Love Radio on 16 September 2009. A music video was shot in Berlin. Due to his contractual obligations in Greece, including the promotion of Kolaz, his affairs in Germany were then put on hold. A two track CD-Single of "More Than Beautiful" was planned to be released on 2 April 2010, although Hatzigiannis later shifted focus and decided against the release. In July 2010, Hatzigiannis released "Everyone Dance", the English version of the Greek hit "Heria Psila" with English lyrics by Rea Garvey of Reamonn. A video was also shot in the Aegean, and released on 19 July 2010. On 30 July 2010, Hatzigannis released "Everyone Dance" as a two track CD-Single in Germany. The single is to be followed up with an English studio album titled Mihalis in Germany, to be released on 13 August 2010. The iTunes release of the album will also include an exclusive bonus song titled "Kiss on the Breeze".

In December 2010, Hatzigiannis released the studio album To Kalitero Psema (The best lie). The album was certified 4× Platinum. The next album was released in December 2011, titled Tharros I Alitheia (Truth or dare). The album released four singles and was certified Platinum.

His album is I Agapi Dinamoni (Love Gets Stronger) featuring 11 tracks, including the No. 1 singles Se Ena Tiho and I Agapi Dinamoni and 3 more hit singles Mesa Sou Vriskome, Kati Dinato and Poios Ime Ego. The album was certified Platinum in Greece.

In 2017 he released his 11th album titled Erotas Agathi but failed success.

In January 2025 Michalis released his 12th studio album titled Terra Incognita by Heaven Music.

Besides it was announced that Hatzigiannis would be chairman of Ethnikós Telikós 2025 jury, through which Greece is going to select its representative in the Eurovision Song Contest 2025.

== Personal life ==
From 1994 to the beginning of 2000, Hatzigiannis was in a relationship with his schoolmate Diamanto Nikivelou. From 2003 to 2009, he was in a relationship with Greek-Cypriot singer Despina Olympiou. In June 2010, Hatzigiannis was in a relationship with Greek actress and TV hostess Zeta Makripoulia which ended in February 2021.

== Discography ==
- Netrino (1999) feat. Babis Stokas & Kostas Tournas [CD Single]
- Paraxeni Giorti (2000) [1st Album]
- Den Eho Hhrono (2001) [CD Single]
- Krifo Fili (2002) [2nd Album]
- Monos Mou (2003) [CD Single]
- Akatallili Skini (2004) [3rd Album]
- Den Fevgo (2005) [CD Single]
- Filoi Kai Ehthroi (2006) [4th Album]
- Krata Me (O Giteftis) (2007) [CD Single]
- 7 (2008) [5th Album]
- Kolaz (2009) [6th Album]
- Mihalis (2010) [7th Album]
- To Kalitero Psema (2010) [8th Album]
- Tharros I Alitheia (2011) [9th Album]
- I Agapi Dinamonei (2013) [10th Album]
- Erotas Agathi (2017) [11th Album]
- Terra Incognita (2024) [12th Album]

== Awards ==
| Preceded by Hara and Andreas Constantinou with Mana Mou | Cyprus in the Eurovision Song Contest; 1998 | Succeeded by Marlen Angelidou with Tha 'Ne Erotas |
