= Vrohi Ton Asterion =

Vrohi Ton Asterion Βροχή Των Αστεριών

Studio album by Glykeria
- Released: December 2006
- Genre: Modern Laika, pop
- Length: 55:54
- Language: Greek
- Label: Sony BMG Greece/Akti

Glykeria chronology
Aniksi (2004)	Vrohi Ton Asterion; Βροχή Των Αστεριών (2006)	Sta Themelia Einai Ta Vouna (2008)

Singles from Vrohi Ton Asterion
- 1. "Kryfto" Released: November 2006; 2. "3os Orofos" Released: January 2007

Vrohi Ton Asterion (Greek: Βροχή Των Αστεριών; English: Raining Stars) is a studio album by Greek artist Glykeria. It was released in November 2006 by Sony BMG Greece and also is her first studio album since the Gold 2004 release of Aniksi.

The album involves an array of lyricists and composers including fellow artists Mihalis Hatzigiannis and Haris Alexiou; also other well-known writers/composers Eleana Vrahali, Nikos Terzis, Nikos Moraitis and Glykeria's long-time collaborator Stefanos Fotiadis. The album also features Melina Aslanidou in the duet "I Zoi Odigi Taxi".

== Track listing ==
No.	Title	Lyrics	Music	Length
1.	"Kryfto" (Hide and seek)	Eleana Vrahali	Mihalis Hatzigiannis	4:28
2.	"3os Orofos" (Third floor)	Tasos Pougiatsis	Kostas Segkis	3:41
3.	"Ena Antio" (A goodbye)	Haris Alexiou	Hristos Papadopoulos	4:37
4.	"Kyklos" (Circle)	Giannis Kalpouzos	Christoforos Germenis	4:05
5.	"Ena Tsigaro" (One cigarette)	Giannis Pagoulis	Christoforos Germenis	3:52
6.	"I Zoi Odigi Taxi" (Life drives a taxi)	Giorgos Pavrianos	Nikos Terzis	3:37
7.	"Ola Mou Ta Kalokairia" (All my summers)	Nikos Moraitis	Chambao	3:33
8.	"Den Eho Polla" (I don't have much)	Nikos Moraitis	Mihalis Hatzigiannis	3:36
9.	"Eisai To Lathos Mou" (You are my mistake)	Tasos Pougiatsis	Polis Pelelis	4:07
10.	"Emeis I Moni" (Us, all alone)	Nikos Moraitis	Stamatis Krouanakis	3:34
11.	"Ta Antikimena" (The objects)	Vasilis Papadopoulos	Dimitris Kordatsis	3:52
12.	"Vrohi Ton Asterion" (Raining stars)	Mihalis Favios	Dimitris Paraskevopoulos	4:03
13.	"Na Simvi" (If it happens)	Eleana Vrahali	Mihalis Hatzigiannis	3:47
14.	"Pes Sto Proi" (Tell the morning)	Giorgos Sarris	Stefanos Fotiadis	3:46
15.	"Pion Ehthro Polemas" (Who's the enemy you're fighting)	Rebecca Roussi	Kostas Segkis	4:06
