= Glykeria =

Greek singer (born 1953)

Glykeria Γλυκερία
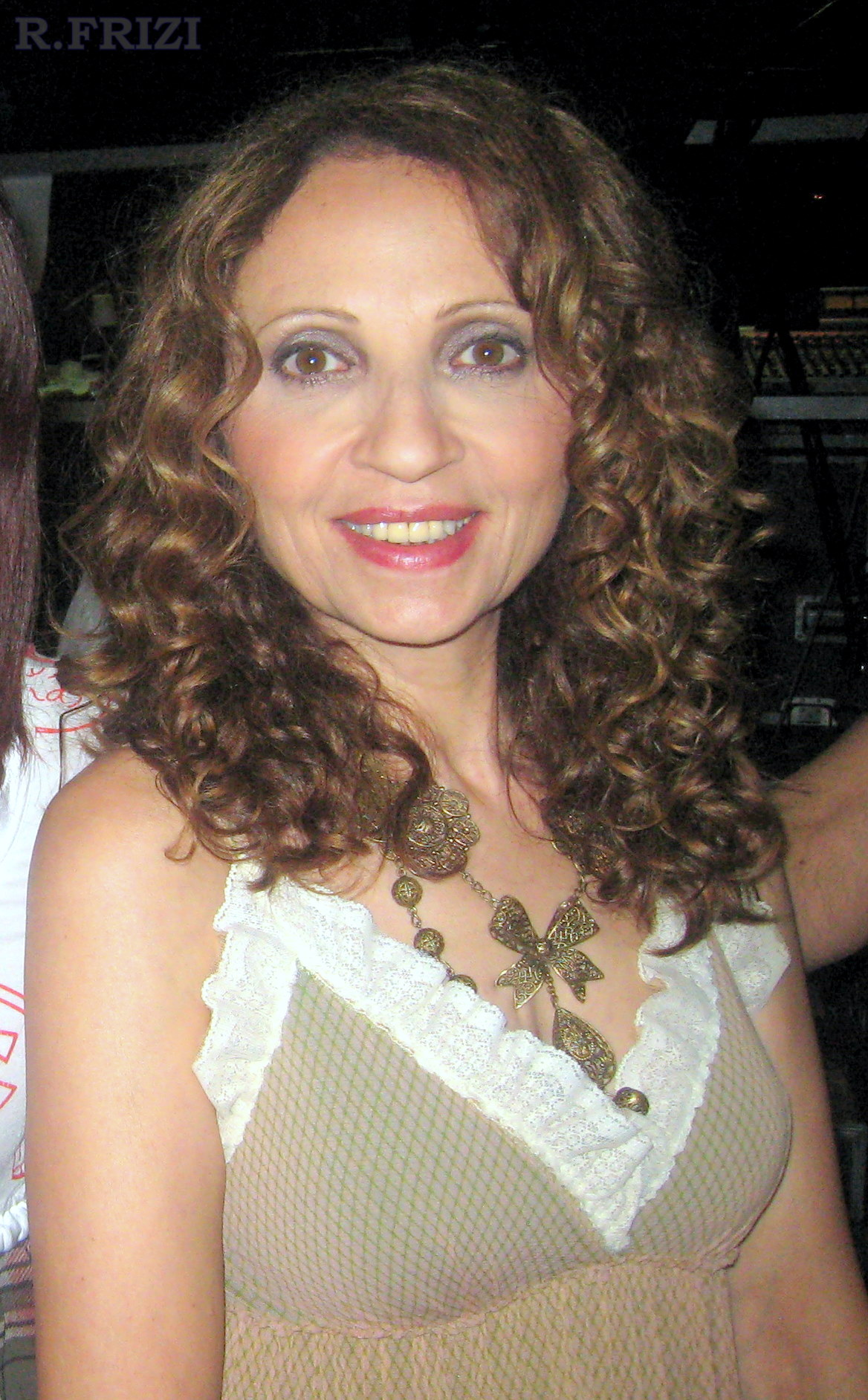

Background information
- Born: Glykeria Kotsoula; 16 November 1953 (age 72); Agio Pnevma, Serres, Greece
- Origin: Greece
- Genres: Laïka, Pop, Greek folk
- Years active: 1978–present
- Labels: Lyra; WEA; Hed Arzi; NMC Music; Helicon Records; Sony Classical; Sony BMG Greece; Legend Music
- Website: glykeria.net

Glykeria (born Glykeria Kotsoula, Greek: Γλυκερία; born 16 November 1953 in Agio Pnevma, Serres) is a Greek singer active in Greece and Cyprus, while also gaining fame in Israel, France, Turkey, Spain, and England. Her career has spanned over 30 years and is marked by several multi-platinum releases. On 14 March 2010, Alpha TV ranked Glykeria the third top-certified female artist in the nation's phonographic era (since 1960).

== Biography ==
=== Early solo career ===
Glykeria began her career in 1974 working in the Athens Plaka music boites and gave performances with well-known artists, singing songs by M. Hadjidakis, M. Theodorakis, M. Loizos and others.

She began her discographical career by signing with Lyra Music, releasing her first album alongside another rising artist Giorgos Gerolymatos called "Min Kaneis Oneira" (Don't Dream) in 1978. This release caused a stir in the industry, showcasing Glykeria's unique voice to the nation.

=== 1980-1985: rise to fame ===
At the beginning of the 1980s, Glykeria released her first solo album, "Ta Smyrneika", a compilation album with traditional songs from Smyrna. During the following years, Glykeria performed at well-known clubs and bouzoukia, gaining momentum and many fans, and collaborating with other well-known singers, including George Dalaras. The same year she released her debut album "Sta Matia Koita Me", which was composed entirely by Stelios Fotiadis and marked the beginning of their successful continuing collaboration.

In 1982, she was selected to represent Greece in the Europalia '82 festival in Brussels, together with Sotiria Bellou, George Dalaras and Margarita Zorbala. The following year, Glykeria released her first official live concert "Omorfi Nyhta" and due to its massive success Lyra released her first live album, "me ti Glykeria Stin Omorfi Nyhta", which went on to break every musical sales record in Greece up to that point.

In April 1985, the release of the double-disk album "Tragoudi Aisthimatiko" brought to life some of Glykeria's biggest hits, like "Magisses", "Pentohiliara", "Ta Dahtilidia" and "Fantaraki", pointing the new artist to first place in the album sales of 1985 amongst national and international sales.

In 1986, she sang “Earini Symfonia” (poem by Yiannis Ritsos, music by Yiannis Markopoulos) for the song’s premier performance, at the opening ceremony of the World Championships held for the first time at the Athens Olympic Stadium, broadcast to 120 countries all over the world.

=== International career ===
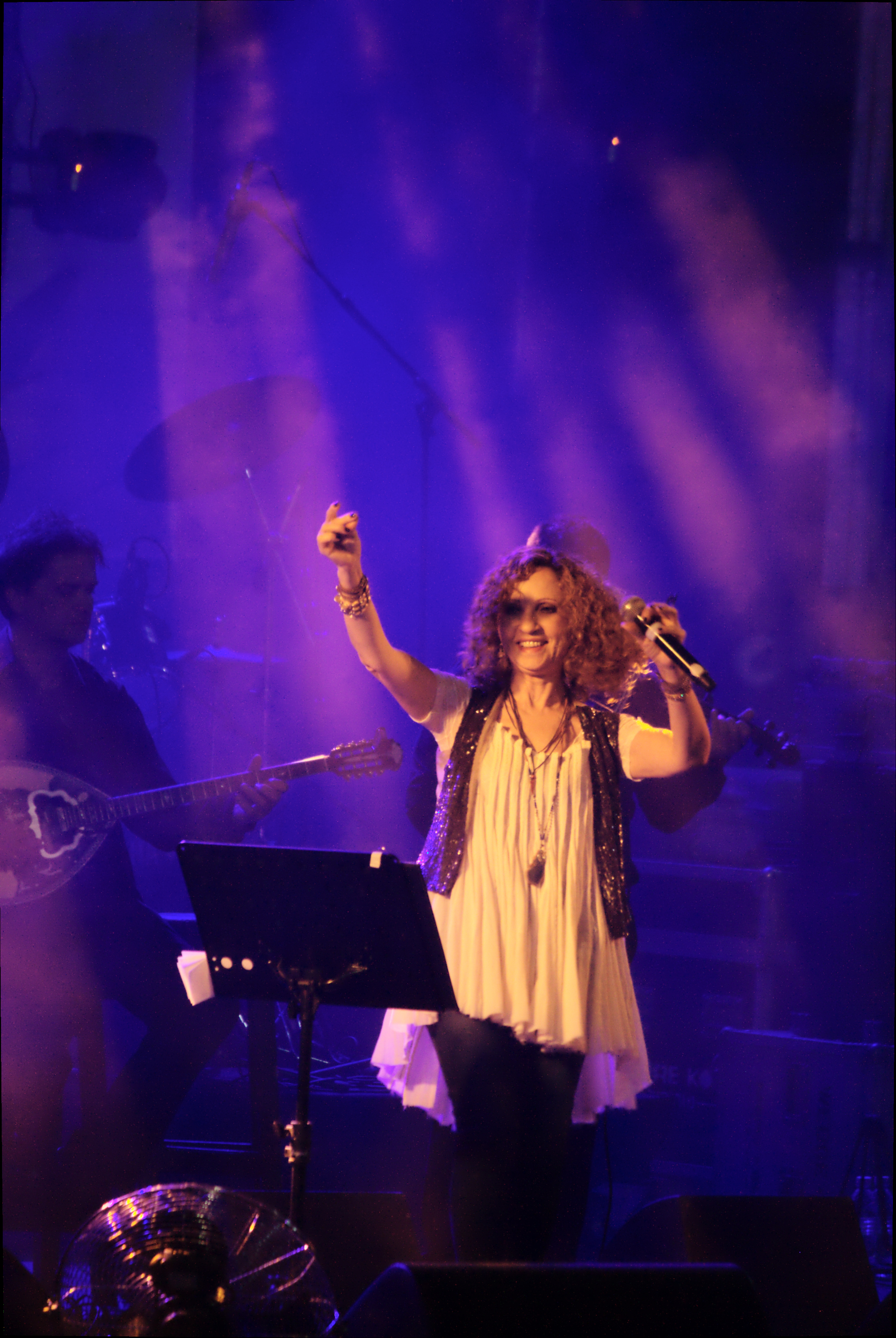
During a concert held in Rishon LeZion, September 2013.

She has sung in concerts in Greece and abroad (Europe, USA, Canada, Australia, New Zealand, Cyprus, Israel and Turkey). Due to the successful concerts she gave in Israel she was proclaimed most popular foreign singer; the Mayor of Jerusalem awarded her the golden key of the city (1994). Three albums were released in Israel at the same time, all of them gold in a very short time: Glykeria golden-hits, Far away, Glykeria – 14 classics, and her first album in France: Golden hits – The voice of Greece.

In 1998, her second album was released in France. She took part in two albums for the American label Putumayo and in compilations released in Europe.

In 1999, she performed two concerts in Tel Aviv with the Israel Philharmonic Orchestra. A few months later the concert’s album was released and, immediately afterwards, Glykeria and the Israel Philharmonic Orchestra was released throughout the world by Sony Classical.

In 2001, she participated in the album Alif of the musician Omar Faruk Tekbilek.

In 2002, she gave concerts with the “Mikis Theodorakis Orchestra”, the “Estudiantina” orchestra, and gave a personal tour all over Greece as well.

In the same year, her album “Open Heart” was released in Israel and “Glykeria’s Rebetika Songs” in Turkey. In the First Arion Awards in Greece she was awarded the prize for best Greek popular singer. Glykeria, "The Sweet one" in Greek, has been a successful female singer in Greece for many years. In the summer of 1993 she performed in Israel for the first time. She ended her performance with her own captivating version of an Israeli folk song "Shabechi Yerushaly'im" ("Praise the Lord, Jerusalem!") in Hebrew.

Glykeria gained a following in Israel and became a part of Israel's cultural scene in the 1990s. Her style, full of depth, melancholy and emotion captured the heart of the Israelis, and her songs, both in Hebrew (with near perfect pronunciation) and Greek became all-time classics. She became a "household" name in Israel, an "honorary citizen", a platinum and gold albums seller, and the favorite of Israel's top leaders and celebrities. Her deep connection to Israel culminated in 1998 when she was the only foreign artist to be invited to sing in the special memorial event for Yitzhak Rabin, the leader who was assassinated three years earlier. With tears in her eyes she sang in front of 200,000 people in Rabin Square in Tel Aviv. In the summer of 1999 she was invited to perform with the Israeli Philharmonic Orchestra. Also in 2006 during the Israel–Lebanon conflict she came to Israel with her son and met Ehud Olmert and sang for the soldiers at the borders.

Glykeria collaborated with composer Mikis Theodorakis on a two-disc album composed of songs written by the famed composer in 2008.

Collaborations in concerts and discography with: A. Kaldaras, S. Fotiadis, Natacha Atlas, Ömer Faruk Tekbilek, Loukianos Kilaidonis, Mary Linda, Pantelis Thalassinos Sotiria Bellou, George Dalaras, Marinella, Ofra Haza, Ricky Gal, Chava Alberstein, Amal Murkus, Babis Tsertos, Paschalis Terzis, Ilias Aslanoglou, Antonis Vardis, Sarit Hadad, Fortuna, Nikos Papazoglou and more.

== Discography ==
- 1978: Min Kaneis Oneira Trela
- 1980: Sta Matia Kita Me
- 1981: Ta Smyrneika
- 1983: Apo ti Smyrni ston Peiraia
- 1984: Stin Omorfi Nyhta (Live)
- 1985: Tragoudi Esthimatiko
- 1986: Matia Mou
- 1987: Me Panselino
- 1988: Nea Selini
- 1990: Ola Mou Ta Mystika
- 1991: Ximerose
- 1992: I Hora Ton Thavmaton
- 1992: Nyhtes Magikes ki Oneiremenes (Live)
- 1994: Se Mia Schedia
- 1996: I Glykeria Tragoudai Antoni Vardi
- 1998: Maska
- 2000: Harama 2000 (Live)
- 2002: Ta Rebetika
- 2004: Aniksi
- 2006: Vrohi Ton Asterion
- 2008: Ta Themelia Mou Sta Vouna
- 2010: I Agapi Einai Eleftheri
- 2014: kane kouragio ellada mou
