= Volk (disambiguation) =

Volk is a German term for a people or an ethnic group.

Volk, Völk or Volks may also refer to:

== People ==
- Volk (surname), people with the name
- Alexander Volkanovski, MMA fighter.

== Places ==
- 6189 Völk, a main belt asteroid
- Volk Field Air National Guard Base, Wisconsin, USA
- Volk's Electric Railway, a heritage railway in Brighton, UK

== Business and Entertainment ==
- "Volk", a song on the 2018 Suspiria album
- Volk (album), a 2006 album by Laibach
- Volk Racing, a flagship brand of forged alloy wheel by Rays Engineering
- Volks, a Japanese doll-making company
- Volks, an informal term for a Volkswagen car
- Volk/Wolf, the protagonist of the Soviet animated series Nu Pogodi

== Other uses ==
- VOLK, abbreviation for "Vector-Optimized Library of Kernels", subproject of GNU Radio
