= Volkmar =

Volkmar, Folkmar or Folcmar is a German given name, now also found as a surname. It is derived from an Old High German compound equivalent to 'people, folk, nation' + 'famous'. Notable people with the name include:

== Given name ==
- Folcmar (bishop of Utrecht) (died 990)
- Folcmar (archbishop of Cologne) (d. 969)
- Volkmar, German priest, one of the ringleaders in the Rhineland massacres (1096)
- Volkmar I of Corvey, abbot of Corvey from 916 to 942
- Volkmar I of Harzgau (d. bef. 961), Count in Harzgau
- Volkmar (bishop of Paderborn) (d. 983)
- Volkmar I (bishop of Brandenburg), bishop from 980
- Volkmar II of Harzgau (d. 1015), Count in Harzgau
- Volkmar II (bishop of Brandenburg) (d. 1102)
- Volkmar II of Corvey, abbot of Corvey from 1129 to 1138
- Volkmar (bishop of Minden) (d. 1094/1096), bishop from 1080
- Volkmar of Niederaltaich, abbot of Niederaltaich from 1280 to 1282
- Volkmar von Fürstenfeld (d. 1314), Cistercian historian
- Volkmar Andreae (1879–1962), Swiss conductor and composer
- Volkmar Braunbehrens (born 1941), German musicologist
- Volkmar Busch (1812–1893), Danish composer
- Volkmar Denner (born 1956), German business executive
- Franz Volkmar Fritzsche (1806–1887), German classical philologist
- Volkmar Fleischer (fl. 1960s), German slalom canoeist
- Volkmar Gessner (1937–2014), German academic
- Volkmar Groß (1948–2014), German footballer
- Volkmar Kuttelwascher (born 1969), Austrian rower
- Volkmar Klein (born 1960), German politician
- Volkmar Kleinert (born 1938), German actor
- Volkmar Klien (born 1971), Austrian composer, artist and educator
- Volkmar Kühn (born 1942), German sculptor
- Volkmar Leimert (born 1940), German composer and dramaturg
- Cirilo Volkmar Machado (1748–1823), Portuguese artist and architect
- Franz Volkmar Reinhard (1753–1812), German Protestant theologian
- Volkmar Sigusch (1940–2023), German physician and sociologist
- Karl Volkmar Stoy (1815–1885), German educator and pedagogue
- Volkmar Thiede (born 1948), German sprint canoeist
- Volkmar Vogel (born 1959), German politician
- Volkmar Weber (born 1974), German bassist and vocalist
- Volkmar Weiss (born 1944), German scientist and writer
- Volkmar Wentzel (1915–2006), German-born American photographer
- Volkmar Würtz (born 1938), German fencer

== Surname ==
- Fred R. Volkmar (born 1950), American psychiatrist
- Theodor Valentin Volkmar (1781–1847), German jurist and politician
- Gustav Volkmar (1809-1893), German theologian

== Fictional characters ==
- Volkmar the Grim, a character in the tabletop game of Warhammer
- Count Volkmar of Gretz, a line of heritage in James A. Michener's The Source

== See also ==
- Veľký Folkmár, a village in Slovakia
- Volkmar River, a river in Alaska
- Volkmer
- Volckmar
