= Volk (surname) =

Volk is a surname of multiple origins.

In several Slavic languages it means "wolf".

As a German surname, it may be a patronymic surname produced as a diminutive for any of names, Volkmar, Volkmer, Volkher, derived from the Germanic word Volk, 'people' or 'army' in Old Saxon. It may also be derived from the Slavic "Volk", from the older layer of German names.

Notable people with the surname include:

- Amy Volk (born 1969), American politician from Maine
- Austin Volk (1918–2010), American politician
- Douglas Volk (1856–1935), American painter, muralist, and educator
- Emily Volk, American pathologist and hospital administrator
- Ernest Volk (1845–1919), German-born American archaeologist
- George Herbert Volk (1881–?), British automobile engineer noted as a pioneer builder of seaplanes
- Helen Volk (born 1954), Zimbabwean hockey player
- Hermann Volk (1903–88), German Catholic cardinal
- Igor Volk (1937–2017), Soviet cosmonaut and test pilot
- Jan Volk, basketball executive
- Joe Volk, English musician and songwriter
- John Volk (1915–2008), American politician
- Karl Volk (1896–1961), Galician politician, journalist and German Resistance fighter
- Klaus Volk (born 1944), German criminal lawyer
- Leonard Volk (1828–95), American sculptor
- Lester D. Volk (1884–1962), American physician, lawyer and politician
- Magnus Volk (1851–1937), British electrical engineer
- Phil Volk (born 1945), American musician
- Rick Volk (born 1945), American football player
- Rita Volk (born 1990), Uzbekistani-American actress and model
- Robert Volk (born 1965), Slovenian soccer player
- Rodolfo Volk (1906–83), Italian soccer player
- Stephen Volk (born 1954), British screenwriter
- Tyler Volk, American academic
- Wilhelm Volk (1804–69), German author who used the pseudonym Ludwig Clarus
- Cindy Renee Volk (born 1977), American former adult actress

== See also ==
- Voelk
