= Der Weg =

Der Weg is German for The Way or The Path, and may refer to:

- Der Weg, a German monthly magazine edited by Walter Blume in 1919
- Der Weg (magazine), an Argentinian pro-Nazi magazine founded in 1947
- "Der Weg", a song from the 2002 album Mensch by German singer Herbert Grönemeyer
- "Der Weg", a song from the 2008 album Licht by German band Die Apokalyptischen Reiter

== See also ==
- Der III. Weg (The Third Path), a far-right political party in Germany
