= Nissan 370Z =

Car model

Nissan 370Z (Z34)
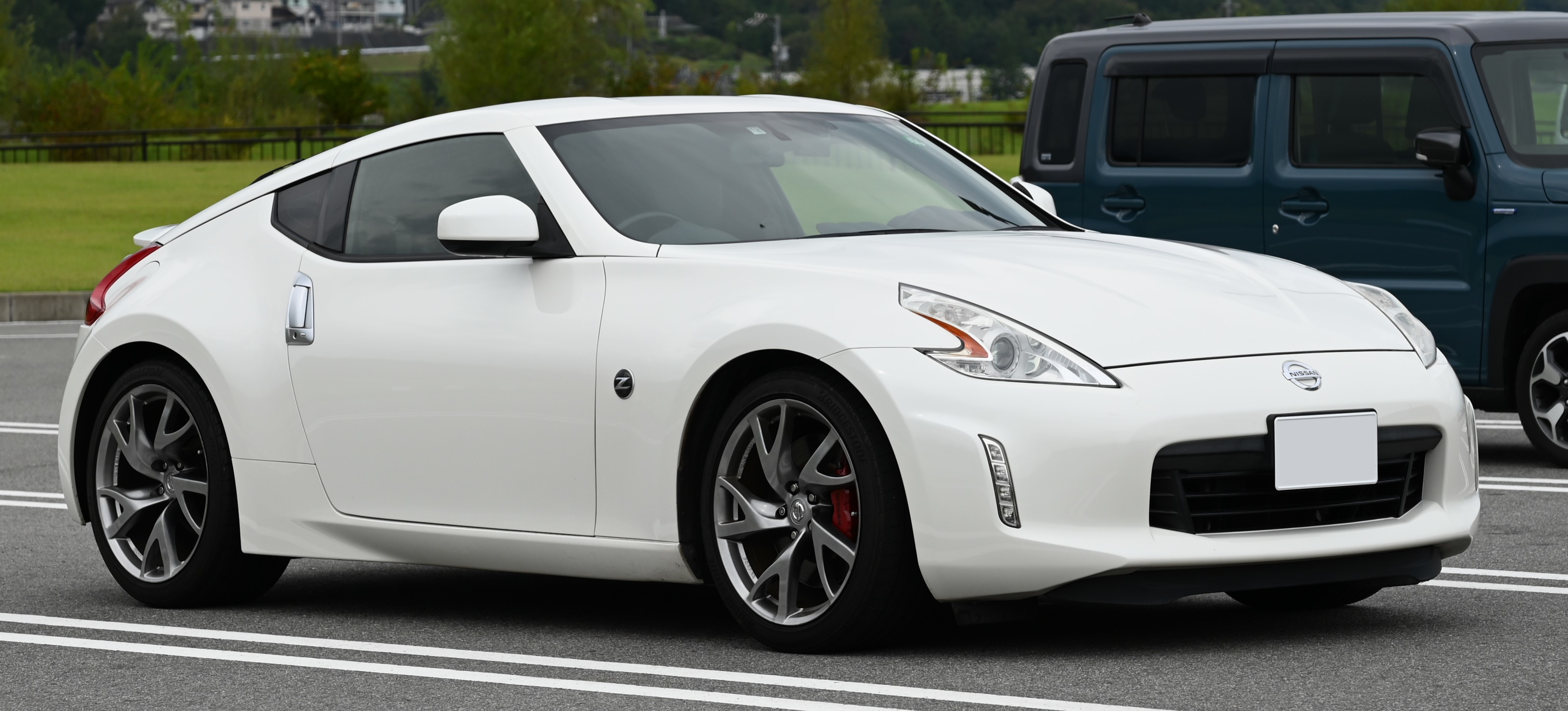
- 2012–2017 Nissan 370Z

Overview
- Manufacturer: Nissan
- Also called: Nissan Fairlady Z (Japan)
- Production: December 2008 – 2020
- Model years: 2009–2020 (North America)
- Assembly: Japan: Kaminokawa, Tochigi
- Designer: Randy Rodriguez; Diane Allen (2005)

Body and chassis
- Class: Sports car (S)
- Body style: 2-door fastback coupé 2-door roadster
- Layout: Front mid-engine, rear-wheel-drive
- Platform: Nissan FM platform
- Related: Infiniti G25/G35/G37 → Q40; Infiniti G37C → Q60; Nissan Skyline (V36/J50); Infiniti EX35/EX37 → QX50; Nissan Z (RZ34)

Powertrain
- Engine: 3.7 L VQ37VHR V6
- Transmission: 7-speed Jatco automatic; 6-speed FS6R31A manual

Dimensions
- Wheelbase: 2,550 mm (100.4 in)
- Length: 4,240 mm (166.9 in)
- Width: 1,850 mm (72.8 in)
- Height: 1,320 mm (52.0 in)
- Curb weight: 3,410–3,542 lb (1,547–1,607 kg)

Chronology
- Predecessor: Nissan 350Z (Z33)
- Successor: Nissan Z (RZ34)

The Nissan 370Z (known as the Fairlady Z Z34 in Japan) is a two-seater sports car which was made by Nissan from 2008 until 2020. Based on the Nissan FM platform, it has a front mid-engine, rear-wheel-drive layout and either a two-door coupé or two-door roadster body style. The 370Z is the sixth generation of the Nissan Z-car line, succeeding the 350Z and preceding the RZ34, which uses a modified version of the same platform. It was sold in North America for the 2009–2020 model years.

== Initial release ==
The 370Z was announced on 29 October 2006, and was first shown at an event in Los Angeles ahead of the 2008 Greater LA Auto Show, before being officially unveiled at the show itself.

=== Engineering ===
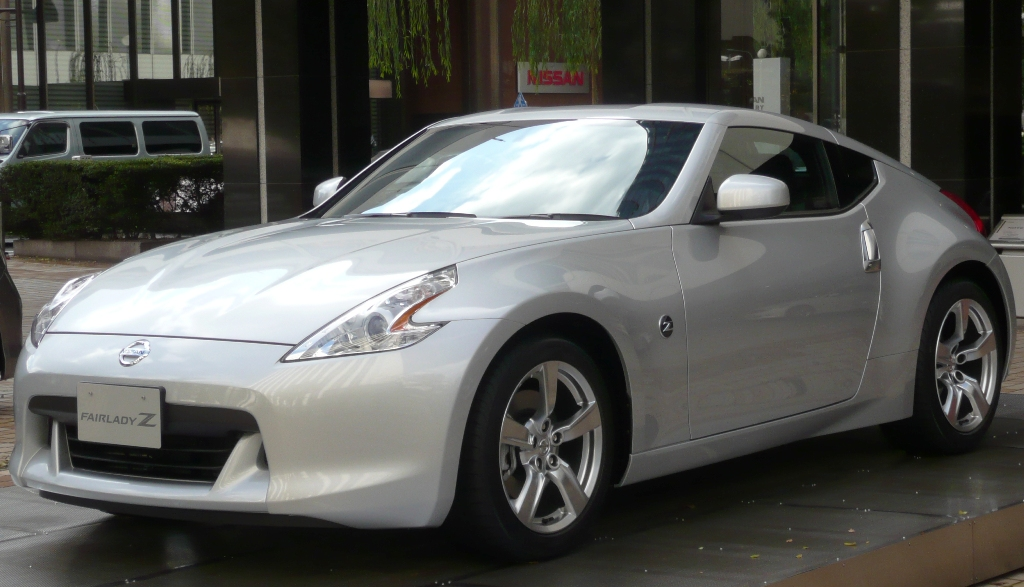
2008 Nissan Fairlady Z coupe

Almost every piece and component of the 370Z has been redesigned from the previous 350Z. The wheelbase is 4 in (100 mm) shorter at 100.4 in (2,550 mm) and an overall length 2.7 in (69 mm) shorter at 167.1 in (4,240 mm). The overall width has been increased by 1.3 in (33 mm), the rear track by 2.2 in (56 mm), and overall height reduced by 0.3 in (7.6 mm). The smaller exterior dimensions and use of more lightweight materials helped reduce weight.

The 370Z features a front aluminium sub-frame, aluminium-alloy engine cradle, aluminium door panels, an all-aluminium bonnet, and an aluminium hatch. Front body torsional rigidity is improved by 10 percent with an extensively revised body structure, which includes a new front suspension cradle to reduce front body lateral bending, new rear structural reinforcements, and an under-body "V-bar" to help reduce rear lateral bending. Rear body torsional rigidity is improved by up to 22 percent and rear body vertical bending rigidity is improved by up to 30 percent. Additional enhancements include the use of a carbon fibre composite radiator housing and strengthening of the rear wings and hatch areas. The new structure weighs slightly less than the 350Z.

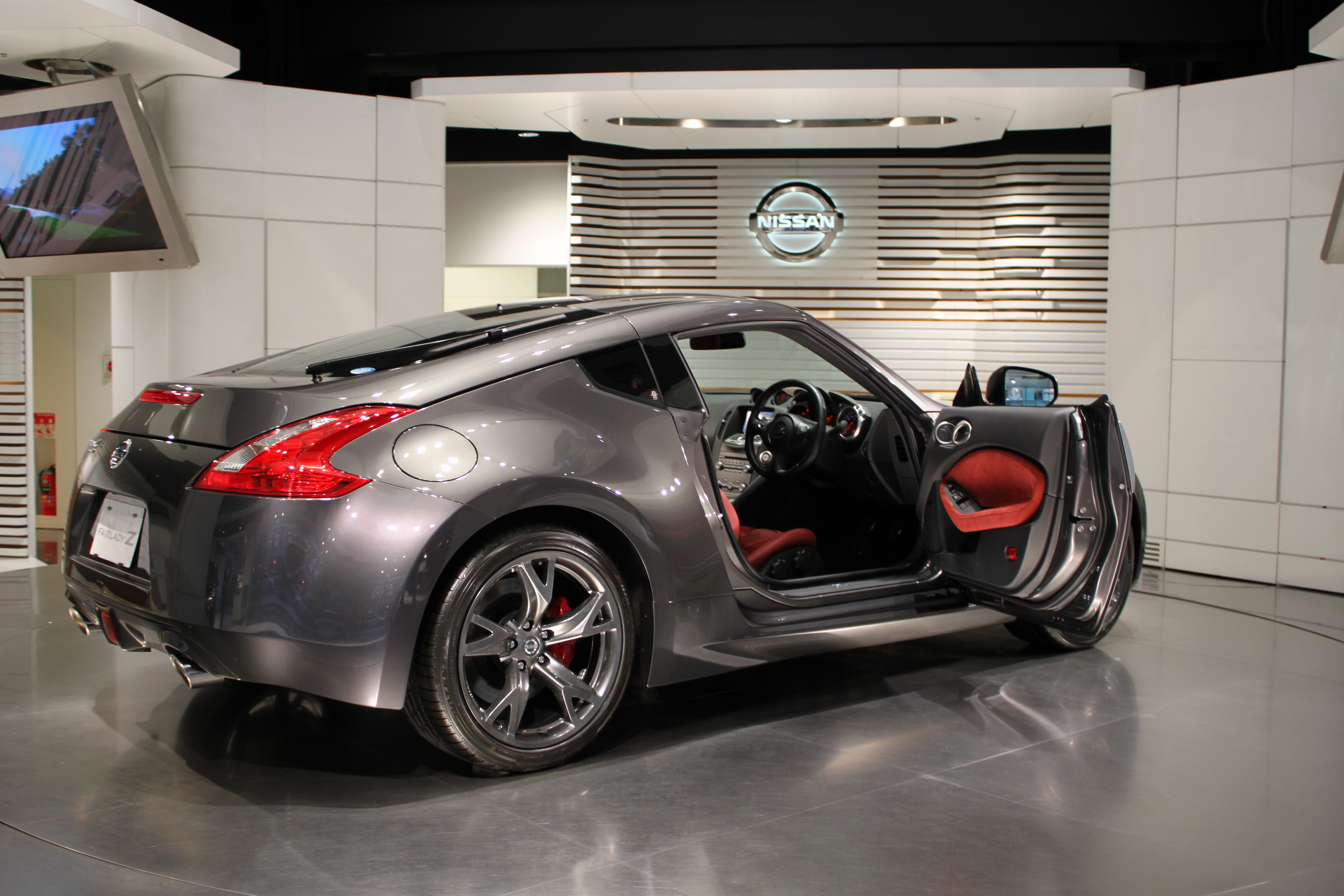
2009 model 370Z - featuring frameless door windows

The 370Z uses a front double wishbone suspension, with forged aluminium control arms and steering knuckle. The rear multi-link suspension uses a forged aluminium upper control arm, lower arm and radius rod, the toe control rod is steel and wheel carrier assembly is aluminium. The refreshed 2013 model uses new dampers with the Sport package models. The brakes have been changed from the more expensive Brembo racing brakes to Nissan branded brakes which are manufactured by Akebono.

The coefficient of drag is 0.30 and 0.29 with the Sport Package, figures identical to the 350Z.

== Variants ==
=== 370Z Coupe (2008–2020) ===
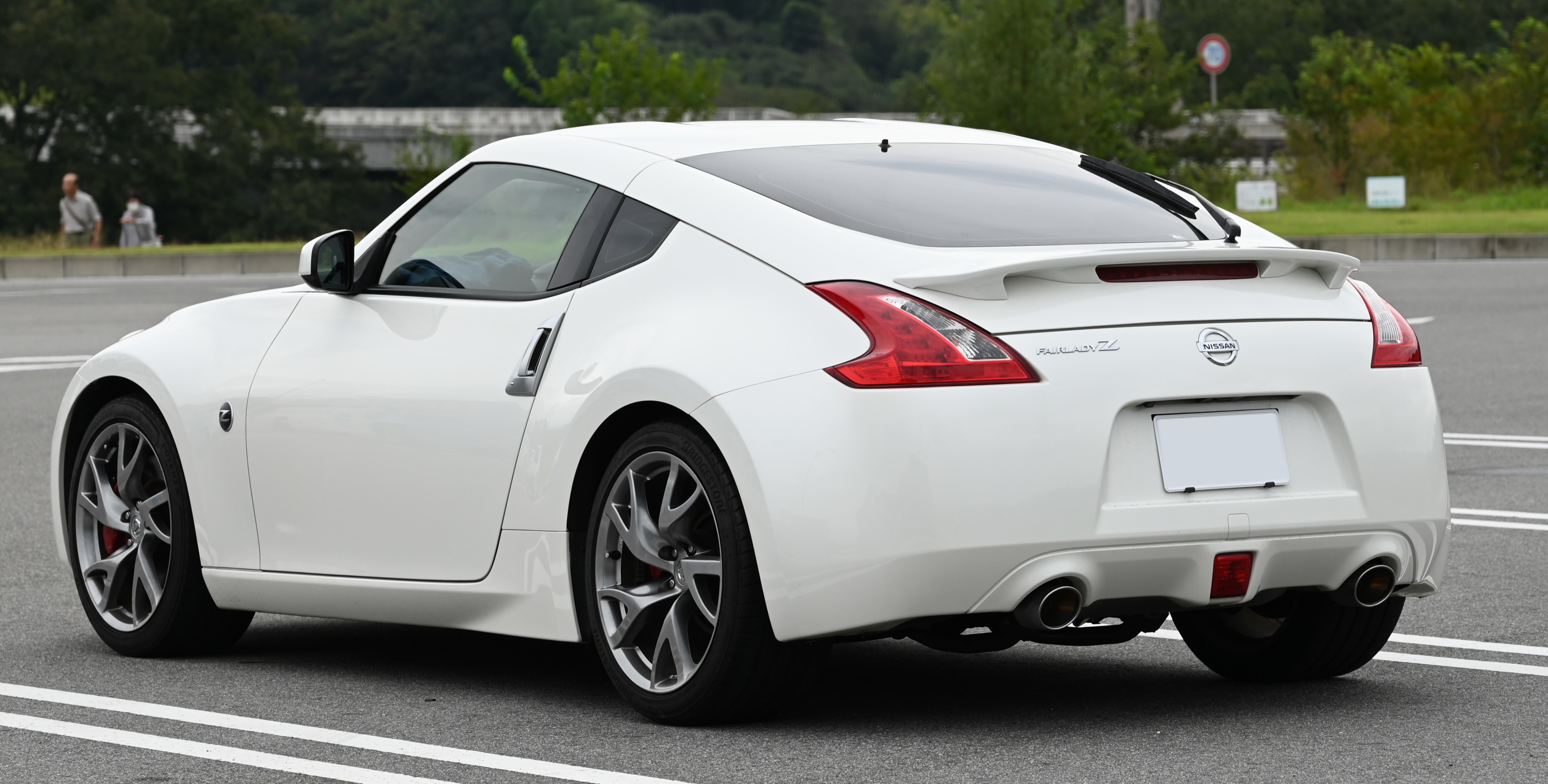
Nissan Fairlady Z coupe (Japan; facelift)

The vehicle was unveiled at the 2008 Los Angeles Auto Show, with sales of the North American model beginning at Nissan dealers in early 2009 for the same year model. The Japanese-spec Fairlady Z Coupe went on sale in 1 December 2008.

Standard and optional equipment includes 19-inch RAYS wheels, Bluetooth, Sirius/XM satellite radio, heated electric seats, viscous limited-slip differential, Bose sound system with dual subwoofers and 6-CD changer, and automatic climate control.

Deliveries of the European specification model began in April 2009.

=== 370Z Roadster (2009–2019) ===
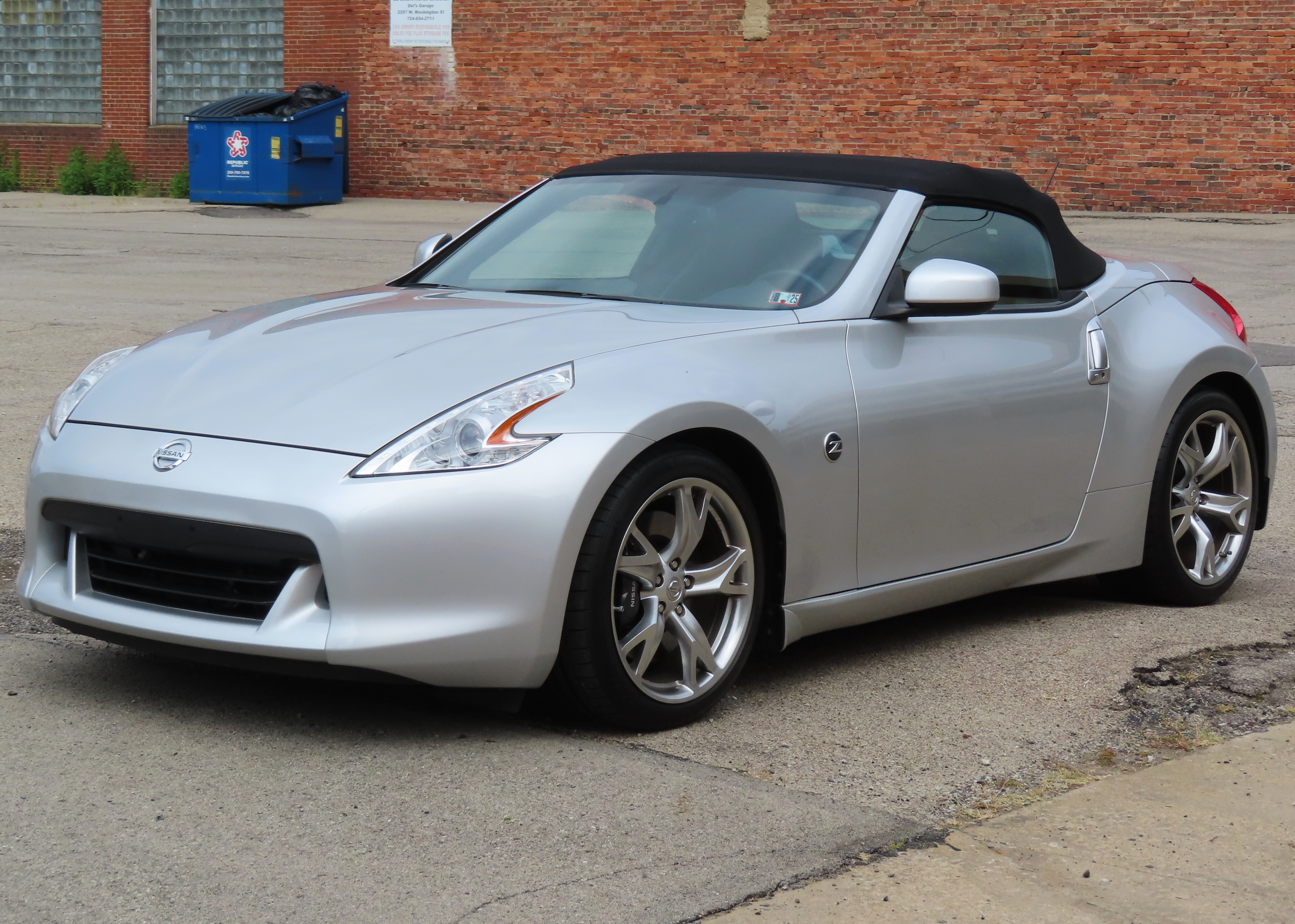
Nissan 370Z roadster (pre-facelift)

The touring model adds heated and cooling leather power net seats, a 6-CD Bose audio system with 8 speakers (with dual sub-woofer) and MP3/WMA playback, XM Satellite Radio, Bluetooth hands-free phone system, HomeLink Universal Transceiver, and aluminium-trimmed pedals.

Touring model also includes the following options:

- Sport Package: adds 19-inch RAYS forged wheels with Bridgestone Potenza tires, Nissan Akebono sport brakes, SynchroRev Match (6-speed manual transmission only), and a viscous limited-slip differential.
- Navigation Package: adds touch-screen Nissan Hard Drive Navigation System with XM NavTraffic real-time traffic information, a 9.3GB Music Box hard drive for digital music storage and playback, and a USB port for iPod connectivity.

Sales of the Japanese model of the Fairlady Z Roadster began on 15 October 2009.

The 370Z Roadster went on sale in late summer 2009 as 2010 model year vehicle. Early models include the 370Z and 370Z Touring, with Sport Package and Navigation packages for the 370Z Touring. European models went on sale as 2010 model year vehicles. The Roadster was discontinued in the US market after the 2019 model year. In Canada, however, it continued to be sold up to its 2020 model year.

=== NISMO 370Z (2009–2020) ===
The NISMO version was introduced for the 2009 model year. The engine produces 350 hp (355 PS; 261 kW) at 7,400 rpm and 276 lb⋅ft (374 N⋅m) of torque at 5,200 rpm with revised ECU settings and exhaust setup. Transmission choice is limited to a 6-speed manual with Nissan's new "SynchroRev Match" function. Handling is improved via stiffened springs and stabilizer bars compared to the 370Z Coupe. Other equipment includes 19-inch RAYS forged aluminium-alloy wheels with Yokohama ADVAN Sport Y-rated tires (P245/40ZR19 front, P285/35ZR19 rear), 14.0-inch front and 13.8-inch rear vented rotors, NISMO Sport Brakes with 4-piston front and 2-piston rear aluminium calipers, and a fully integrated chin spoiler.

The vehicle was unveiled at the 2009 New York Auto Show and went on sale in June 2009. The US model went on sale on 17 June 2009 with an MSRP of US$39,130.

In May 2014, the facelifted Nismo was unveiled in ZDAYZ event as a 2015 model year. The new Nismo design was adopted like other Nismo-models, the exterior design was refreshed. Specifically, Nismo red accents were added to the bumpers and side sill protectors, and new LED daytime running lights. The Rays forged aluminium wheels received a new design, and a rear spoiler was changed. These changes optimised the front and rear downforce balance, improving handling performance at high speeds. The interior featured Nismo-tuned Recaro sports seats and blacked-out trim, Nismo emblem on the centre console and red on the starter button.

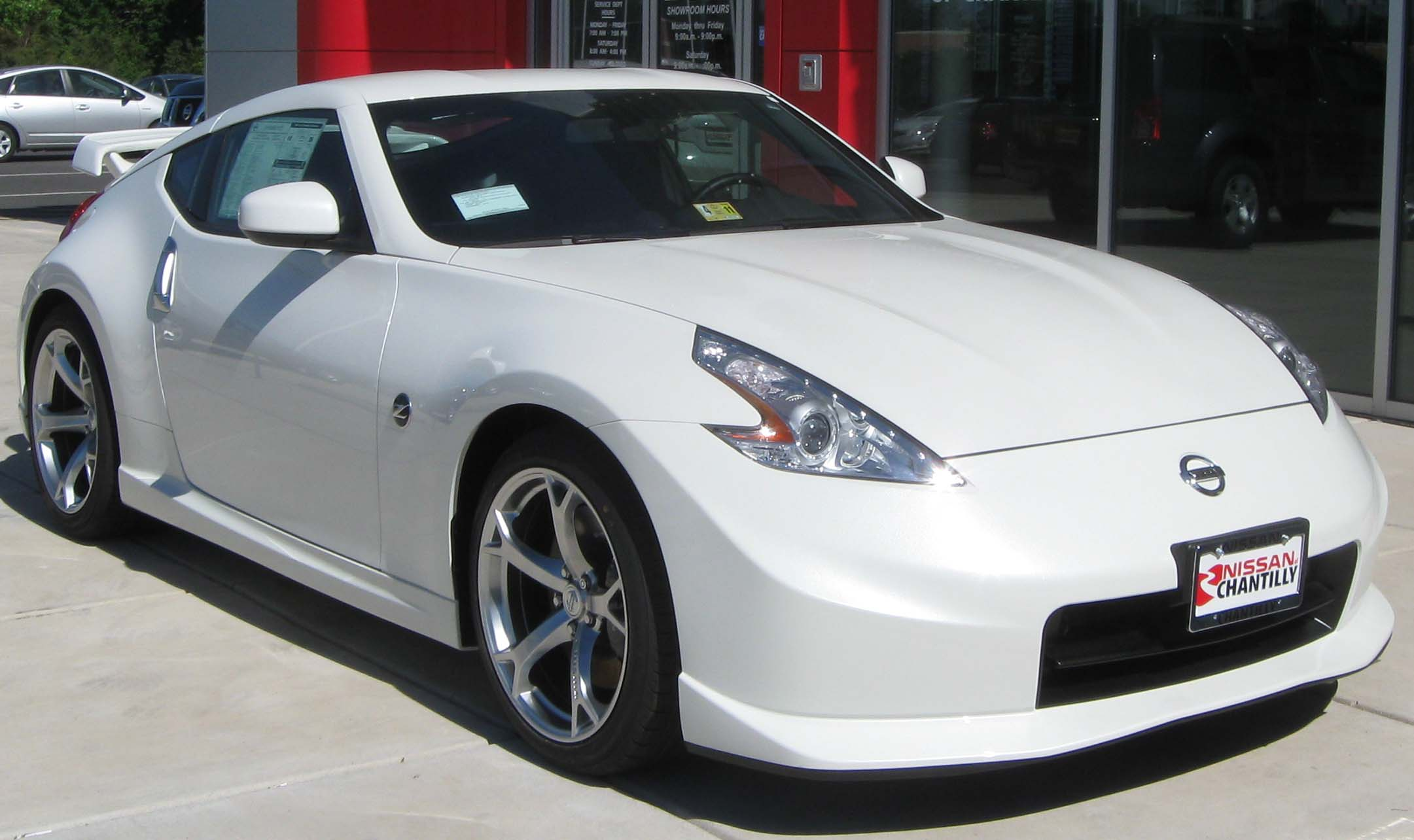
370z NISMO (pre-facelift)

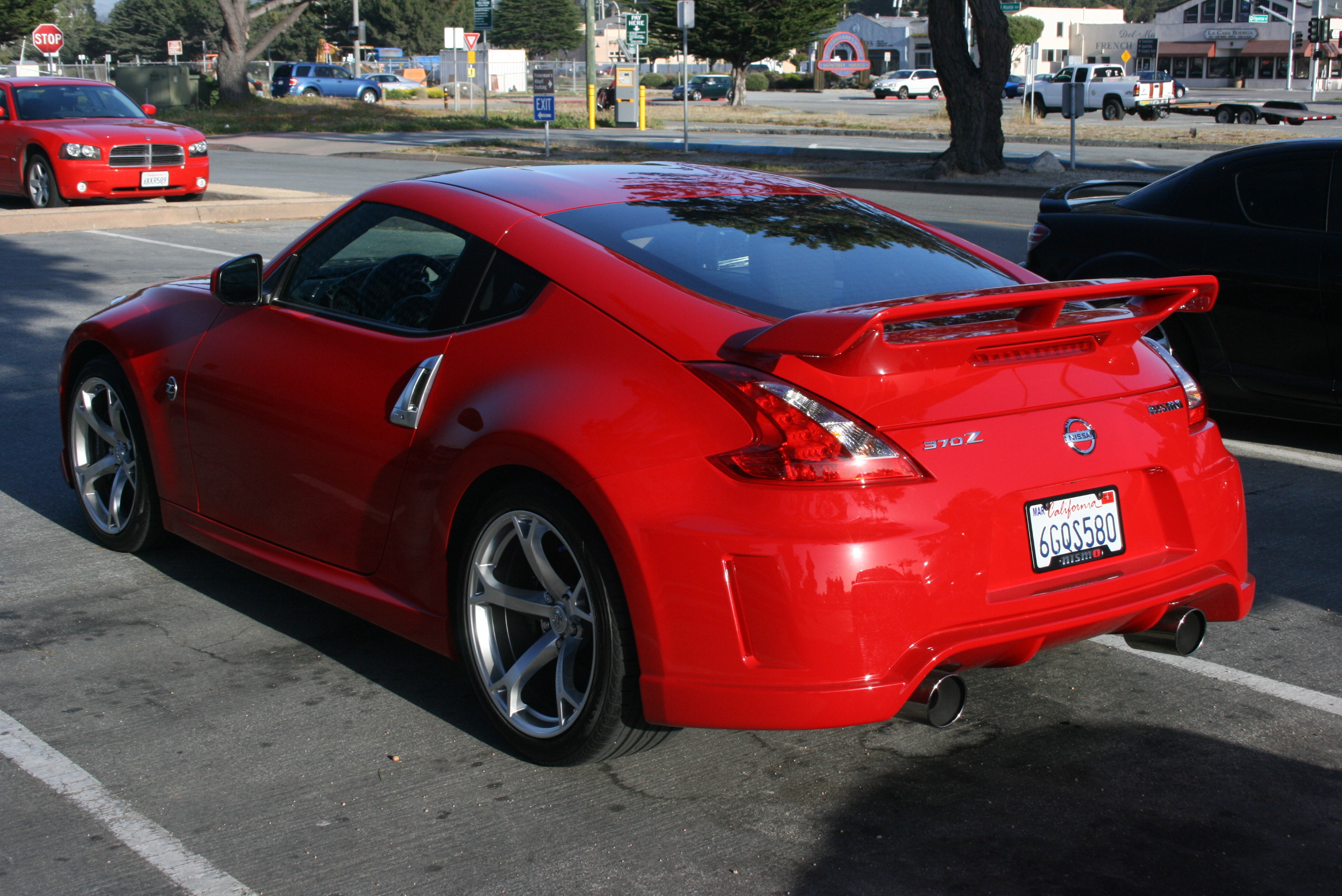
Rear view with spoiler

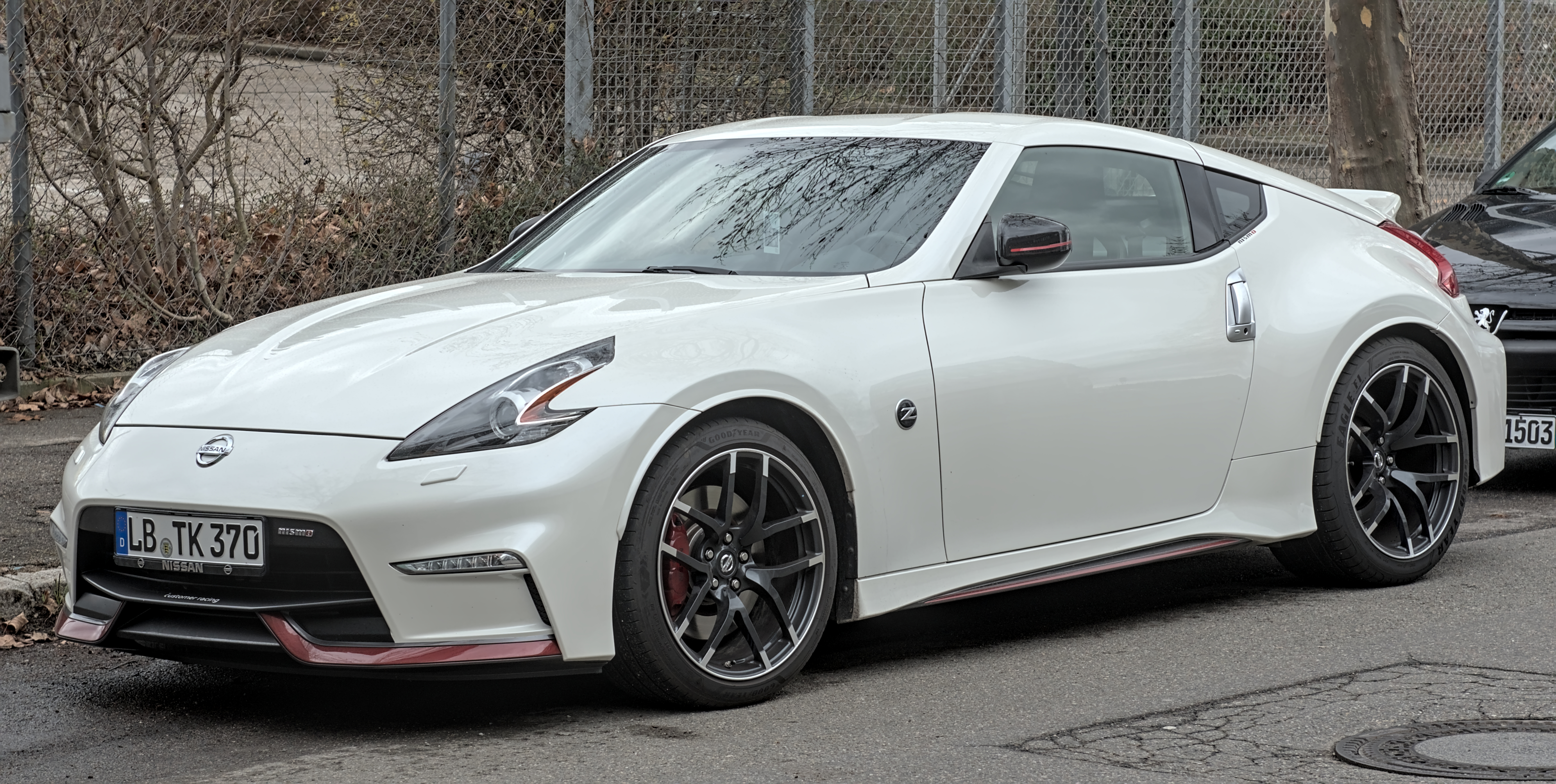
2014 Nissan 370Z NISMO with restyled front end

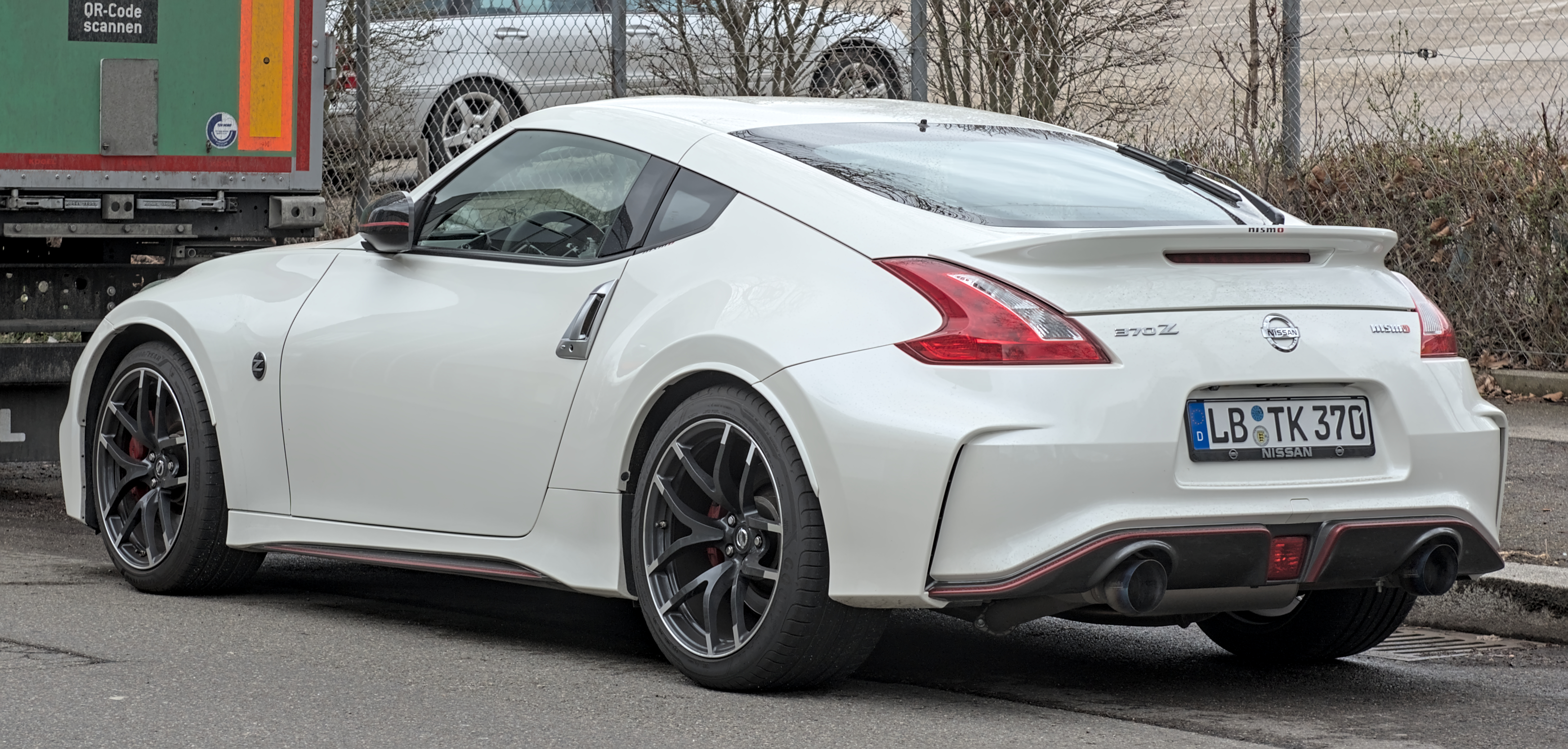
2014 Nissan 370Z NISMO rear view

=== Fairlady Z version NISMO (2011–2013) ===
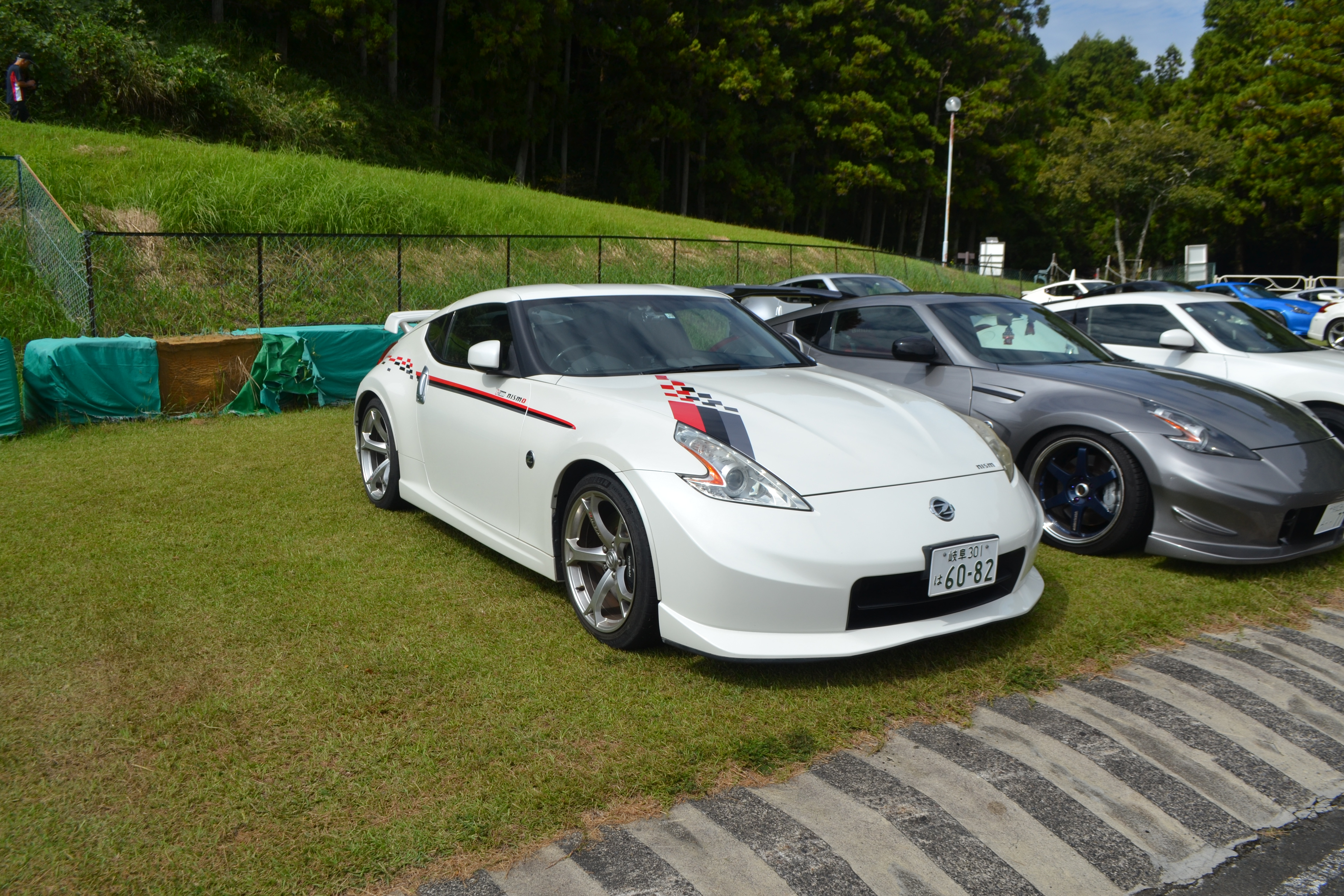
Fairlady Z Version Nismo

The Fairlady Z Version Nismo was unveiled at the 2011 Tokyo Auto Salon, and later at the 2012 Tokyo Auto Salon.

=== 2011 model year updates ===
Changes to the 370Z Coupe and Roadster for the 2011 model year include:

- a new tire pressure monitoring system
- a rear view camera integrated into the Nissan Premium Connect satellite navigation system
- improved isolation of road noise on the Coupé
- automatic versions of both Coupé and Roadster have a revised 'Snow' setting for enhanced grip when setting off on ice and snow
- GT Pack versions add heated and ventilated leather/suede-like seats, a premium BOSE sound system, cruise control, 19-inch forged alloy wheels, Synchro Rev Control technology on the manual version along with Uphill Start Support

European models went on sale as 2011 model year vehicles.

== Special Editions ==
=== 40th Anniversary/Black Edition (2009–2011) ===
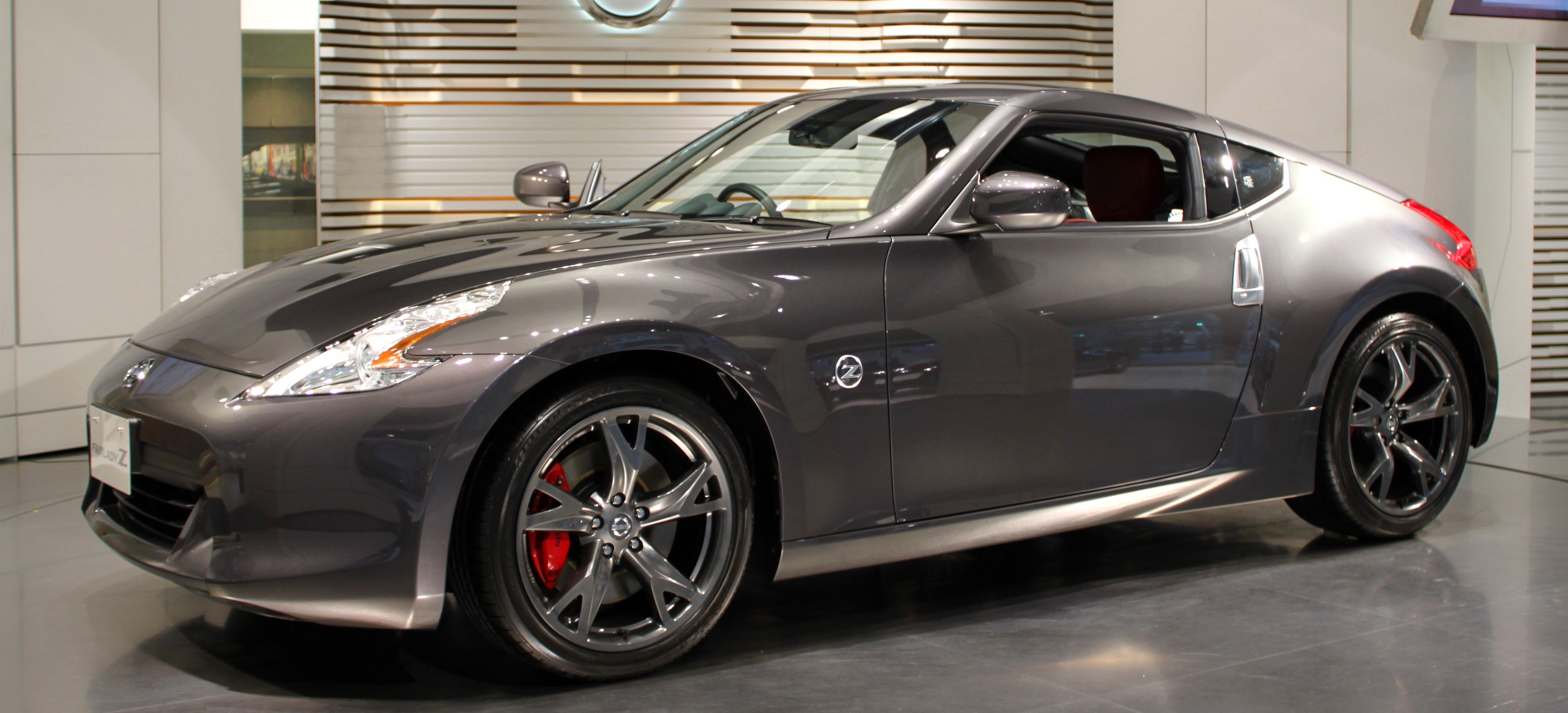
Fairlady Z 40th Anniversary

The Fairlady Z 40th Anniversary is a limited version of the Fairlady Z coupe Version ST for the Japanese market. It was built to commemorate the 40th anniversary of the original Fairlady Z. Based on the 370Z Coupe Touring, built to commemorate the 40th anniversary of the Datsun 240Z arriving in North America. It includes a manual transmission, Sport Package (including SynchroRev Match, front chin spoiler, rear spoiler, Nissan Sport Brakes, 19-inch RAYS forged aluminium-alloy wheels and viscous limited-slip differential), special "40th Anniversary Graphite" exterior colour, red leather interior upholstery, a high-lustre smoke wheel finish, red brake calipers, 40th Anniversary badges on the rear hatch and front strut tower brace, red door panel inserts, 40th Anniversary seat-back and floor-mat embroidery, and red stitching on the centre stack, shift boot and knee-pads. It also has a leather steering wheel with red stitching, a plaque of authenticity, and a commemorative premium satin car cover.

The US market 40th Anniversary Edition was unveiled at the February 2010 Chicago Auto Show. Only manual transmission was available. The 370Z 40th Anniversary Edition limited to 1.000 units.

The Black Edition was unveiled in 4 April 2010 with a limited run of 370 units for the European market and is the same as the 40th Anniversary Edition sold in Japan and the US. The vehicle went on sale at all Nissan High Performance Centres and throughout the dealer network with deliveries starting in April. It was offered in manual and automatic transmissions.

=== 370Z Yellow (2009) ===
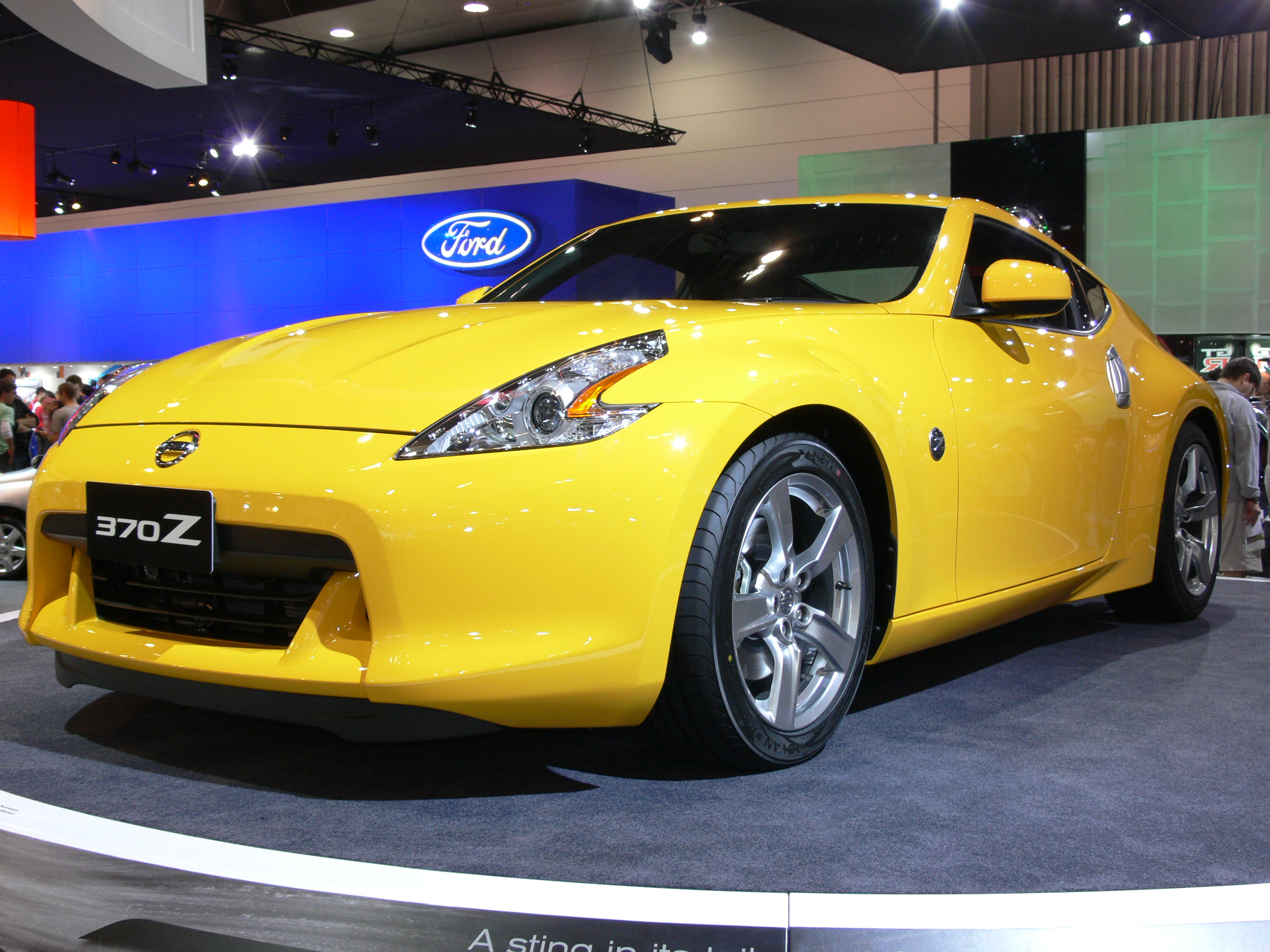
370Z Yellow

The 370Z Yellow is a limited edition of the 370Z GT Pack coupe for the UK market, inspired by the European GT4 race car. It includes an Ultimate Yellow body colour, 19-inch RAYS forged alloy wheels, black leather and suede-like interior upholstery, integrated satellite navigation system, illuminated entry plates, special mats and a Bose audio with 8 speakers and a 6-CD autochanger.

The vehicle went on sale in September 2009 for £31,650 (manual) or £33,050 (automatic).

A North American version was also available with a different paint colour called Chicane Yellow for 2009 only, but is otherwise identical to the standard 370Z. Chicane Yellow was also available the following model year for an extra $500 in North America as the only extra cost colour, with other colours available for no additional charge.

=== 370Z Nürburgring Edition (2009) ===
The 370Z Nürburgring Edition is a limited version (80 units) of the 370Z coupe for the German market. It includes a Premium Ultimate Yellow body colour, special decals, a more sonorous Cobra exhaust system, a numbered plaque, 19-inch OZ alloy wheels, Dunlop SP Sport Maxx GT tires (255/40 R19 front, 285/35 R19 back) and a €150 gift card redeemable at the Nürburgring.

=== 370Z GT Edition (2011–2012) ===
The 370Z GT Edition is a version of the 370Z Coupé commemorating Nissan's global success in GT racing and 40 years of the Z in the UK. It is built for the UK market and includes a choice of 3 body colours, (Pearl White, Kuro (metallic) black and Black Rose), grey 'GT' stripes running along the flanks of the car, 19-inch RAYS forged alloy wheels in dark anthracite colour, re-tuned dampers to provide a better balance between ride comfort and high-speed handling, a rear view parking camera as part of the Premium Connect satellite navigation system, a tyre pressure monitoring system, seven-speed automatic option with snow mode and revised underbody insulation to reduce road noise.

The vehicle went on sale starting at £35,000, and deliveries began on 1 June 2011.

=== Heritage Edition (2017) ===
The 370Z Heritage Edition was unveiled at the April 2017 New York International Auto Show for the 2018 model year to mark the 50th anniversary of the Z car. It was available with exclusive colours: Chicane Yellow (Ultimate Yellow in global market) or Magnetic Black paint with black-painted mirror, Yellow interior trim, and 370Z Side stripes. A 6-speed manual transmission was standard, with a 7-speed automatic as option.

For the US market, sales started in April 2017. It was available in Japan from 11 May 2018.

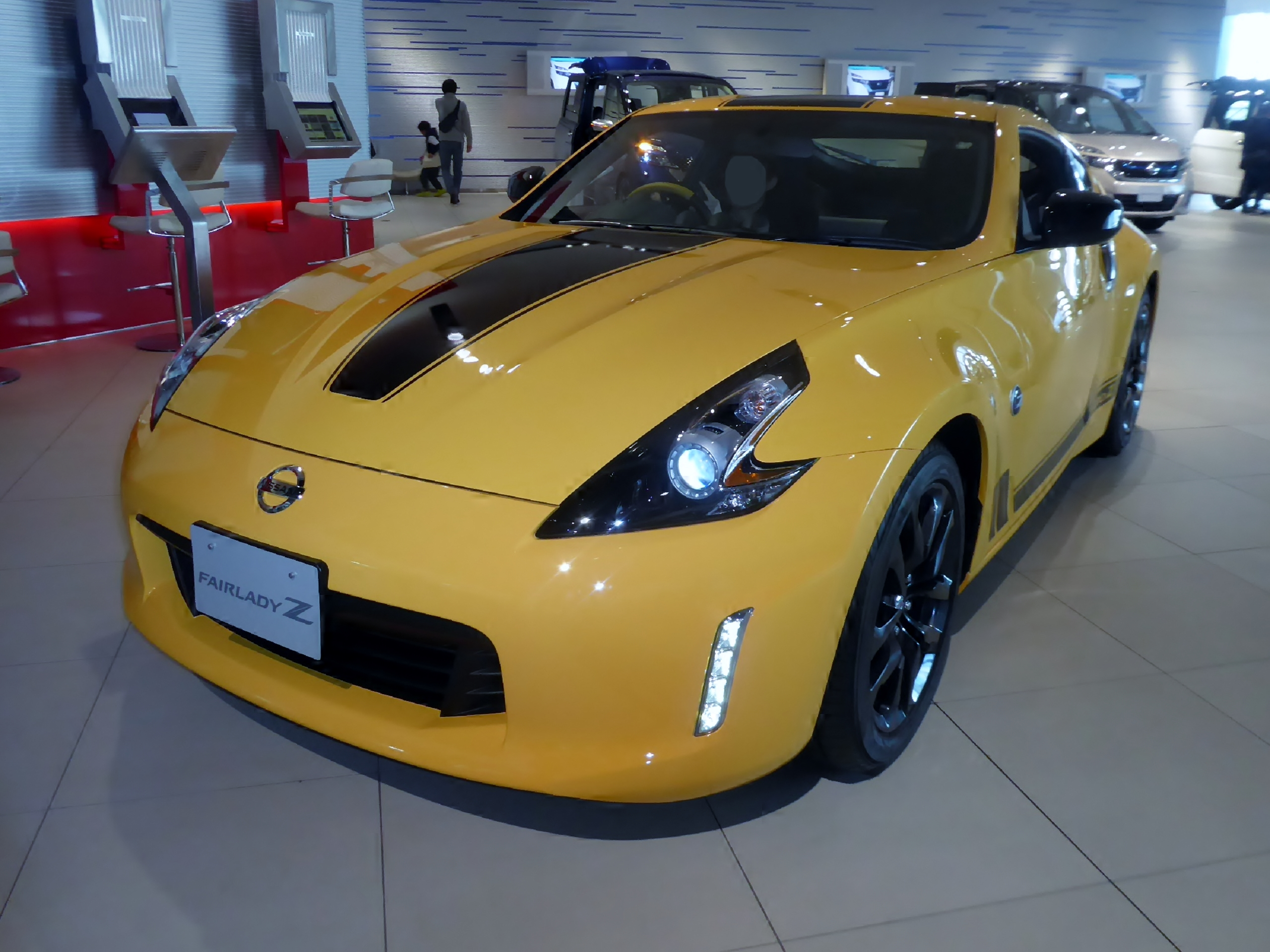
2017 Fairlady Z Heritage Edition (Japan)

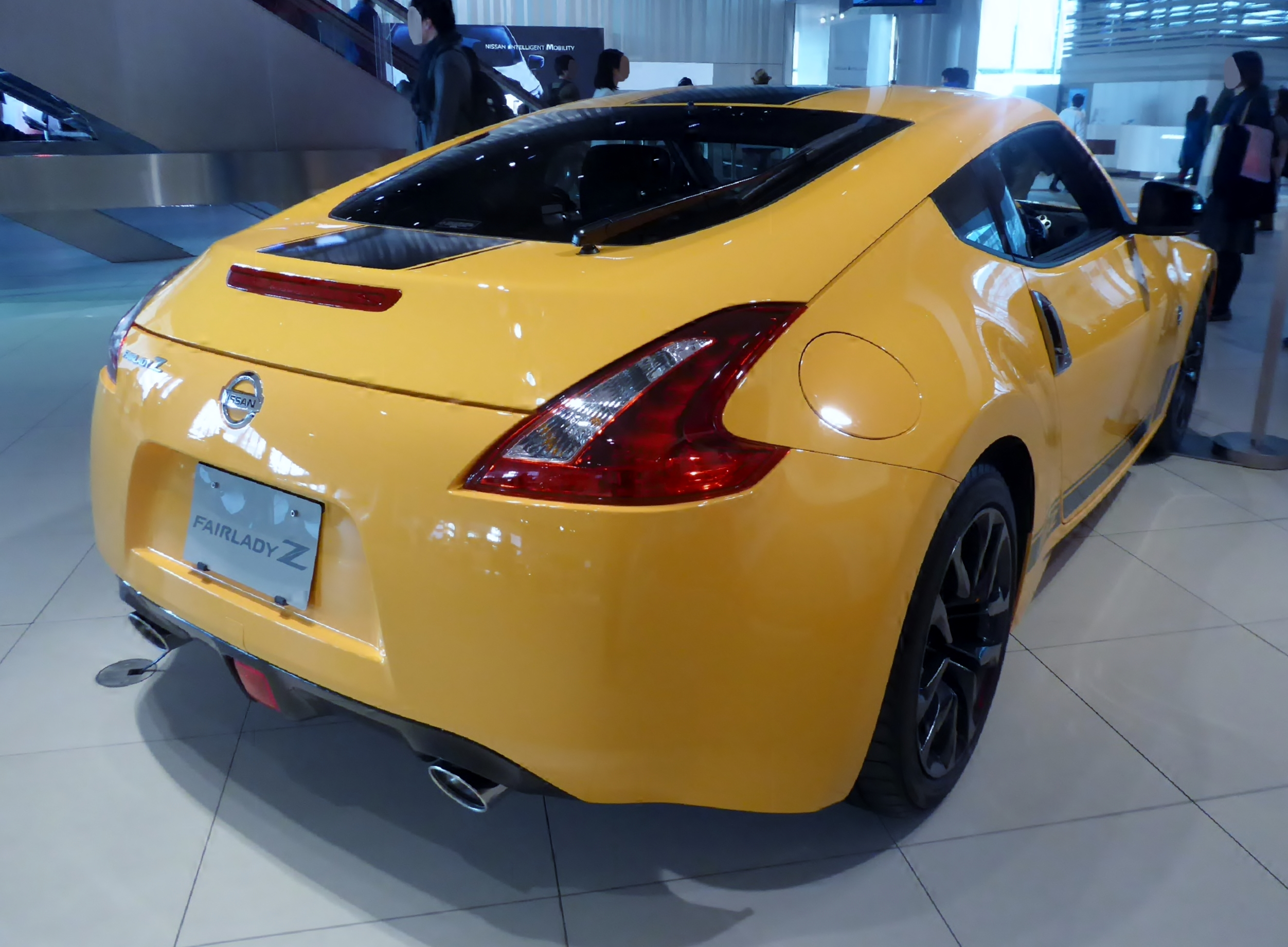
Rear view

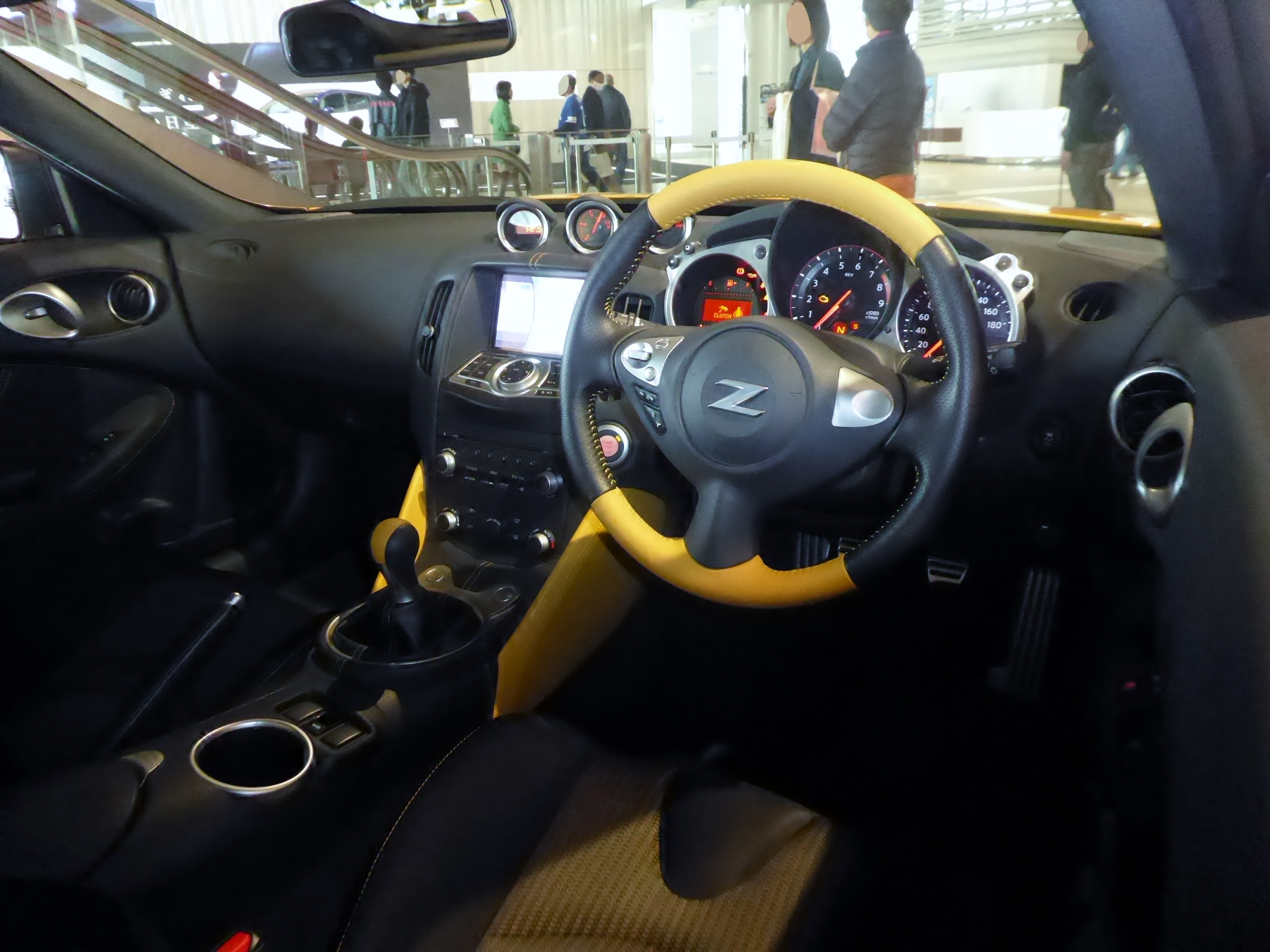
Interior

=== 50th Anniversary Edition (2019) ===
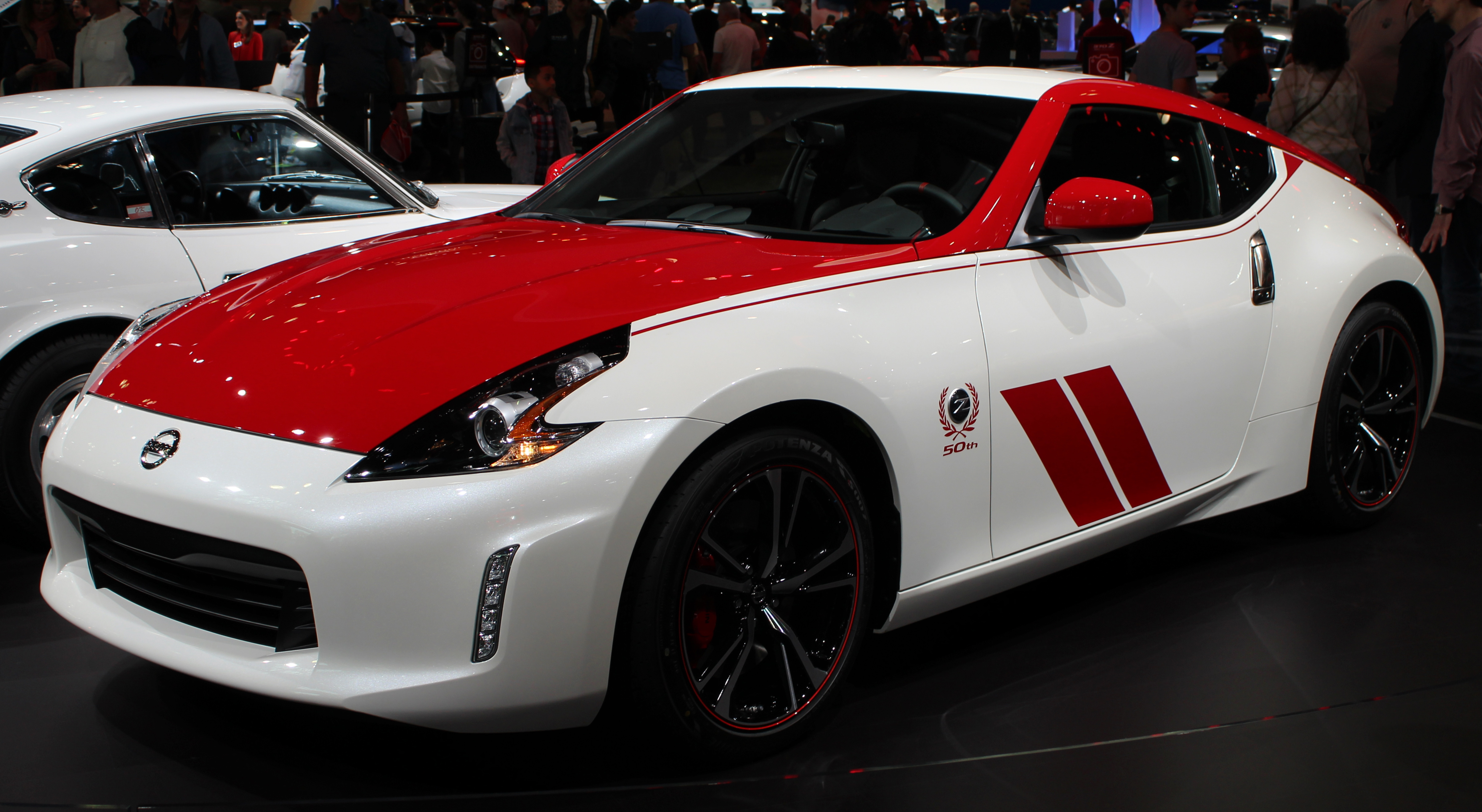
Nissan 370Z 50th Anniversary Edition

The 50th Anniversary Edition was unveiled in April 2019 for the 2020 model year. It includes stripes, 19-inch Rays wheels, rear spoiler and 50th Anniversary badges. Two colour combinations were offered: a brilliant white pearl body with vibrant red accents, and a brilliant silver body with diamond black accents. The interior got an Alcantara suede steering wheel, special stitching on the seats, embossed logos on the seat and a few other small touches. An eight-speaker Bose audio system is as an option.

For the US market, the 50th anniversary went on sale in April 2019. This was followed by Japan in May 2019 and Australia in August 2019.

== Body styles & performance ==
Body type ((CBA-)Z34)	Coupe	Roadster
Model	Years	
370Z	2008-2020	2009-2019
NISMO 370Z	2009-2020	N/A

=== Engines ===
Model	Years	Type/code	Power, torque at RPM
370Z (North America)	2009–	3,696 cc (226 cu in) V6 (VQ37VHR)	337 PS (248 kW; 332 hp) at 7000, 366 N⋅m (270 lb⋅ft) at 5200
370Z (Black Edition)	2010–?	3,696 cc (226 cu in) V6 (VQ37VHR)	328 PS (241 kW; 324 hp) at ?, ? at ?
370Z (Europe)	2009–	3,696 cc (226 cu in) V6 (VQ37VHR)	331 PS (243 kW; 326 hp) at 7000, 366 N⋅m (270 lb⋅ft) at 5200
370Z (UK)	2011–	3,696 cc (226 cu in) V6 (VQ37VHR)	328 PS (241 kW; 324 hp) at 7000, 363 N⋅m (268 lb⋅ft) at 5200
NISMO 370Z	2009–	3,696 cc (226 cu in) V6 (VQ37VHR (NISMO Version))	355 PS (261 kW; 350 hp) at 7400, 374 N⋅m (276 lb⋅ft) at 5200

=== Transmissions ===
All models (including the 2015 Nismo) include either a 7-speed automatic transmission with paddle shifters or a 6-speed manual transmission. SynchroRev Match system for 6-speed manual transmission is included with the Sport Package.

=== Performance ===
The 0–97 km/h (0–60 mph) acceleration times are:

- coupe (6-speed manual): 4.7 seconds
- coupe (7-speed automatic with paddle shifters): 4.6 seconds
- roadster (6-speed manual): 4.9 seconds

402 m (1/4 mile) times from a standing start are:

- coupe: 13.3 seconds at 170.1 km/h (105.7 mph)
- roadster: 13.6 seconds at 165.6 km/h (102.9 mph)

Lateral skidpad acceleration is:

- coupe: 0.99 g
- roadster: 1.00 g

Braking:

- 97–0 km/h (60–0 mph) (roadster): 31 m (103 ft)

=== Physical ===
Curb weight	3,232 lb (1,466 kg) (base)
Wheelbase	100.4 in (2,550 mm)
Length	167.1 in (4,240 mm)
Width	72.8 in (1,850 mm)
Height	51.8 in (1,320 mm)

=== Trim levels ===
- US trims: 370Z (base), Sport, Touring, Sport Touring, NISMO
- Japan trims: Fairlady Z (base), Fairlady Z Version S, Fairlady Z Version T, Fairlady Z Version ST, Fairlady Z Version NISMO

== Marketing ==
The Nissan 370Z is featured in Electronic Arts' Need for Speed: Undercover video game which was released on 18 November 2008. This allowed people to drive the 370Z in-game prior to the vehicle's actual release. Nissan claimed it to be the first time an automaker had a vehicle world premiere by partnering with a video game company.

A version of Megatron Fairlady Z was produced by Takara TOMY, as part of the Transformers Alternity toy line.

As part of the UK market launch, a TV commercial featuring a Nissan 370Z vs. racing chickens was produced.

As part of Nissan's plan to build the ultimate 370Z track car, a campaign allowing fans to vote which components will be used in the project took place in association with Facebook and Autoblog. The suspension choices (hosted by Autoblog) include NISMO S-Tune Springs and Dampers, KW Variant 3s and an A'PEXi S1 Damper System. The completed vehicle includes a GReddy twin turbo kit, GReddy Ti-C catback exhaust system, KW Variant 3 suspension, Stoptech big brake kit with 2-piece aerorotors, Volk TE37SL wheels and a Metalloy decal kit.

== Motorsport ==
The BRE 370Z is a version of the 2010 Nissan NISMO 370Z Coupe built to commemorate the 40th Anniversary of the Z's First National Championship and successful in SCCA racing events with John Morton driving a #46 240Z in 1970 and 1971. The 370Z commemorative car was built by STILLEN and it includes a red, white and blue BRE paint scheme designed by Pete Brock. The vehicle was unveiled at the BRE Reunion dinner at the Classic Motorsports Mitty at Road Atlanta on 29 April 2010.

The Nissan 370Z has enjoyed some successes in motorsport. Notably, in drifting, Chris Forsberg campaigned a twin turbo, 812 horsepower, 676 lb-ft torque VQ37DE 370Z in the 2017 Formula DRIFT season. After an engine failure in the debut round, he piloted his backup 370Z. This car was powered by a 5.6L V8 swapped from a Nissan Titan and produced over 1,000 horsepower.

== 2013 model year update (2012–2020) ==
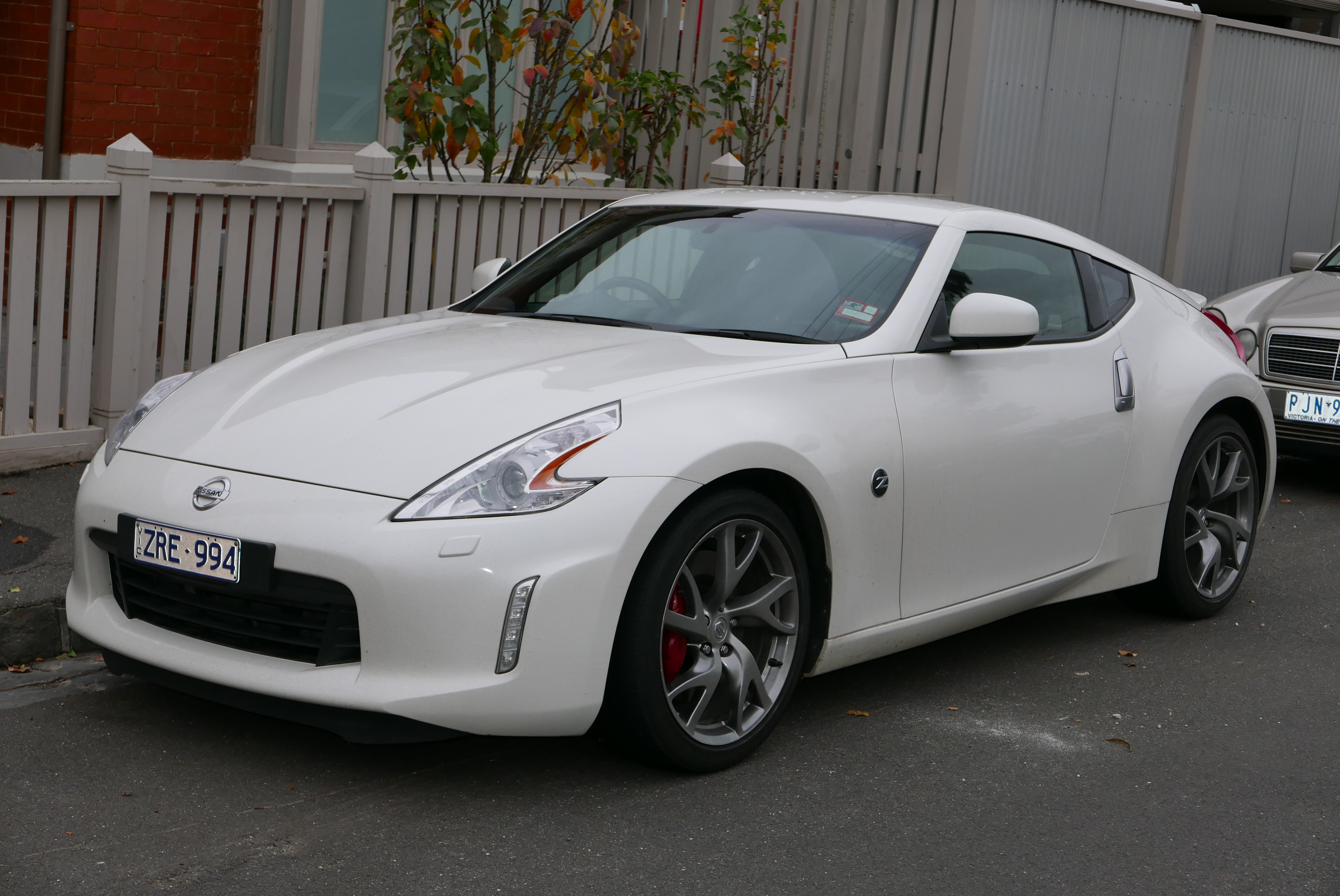
Facelift Nissan 370Z coupe (Australia)

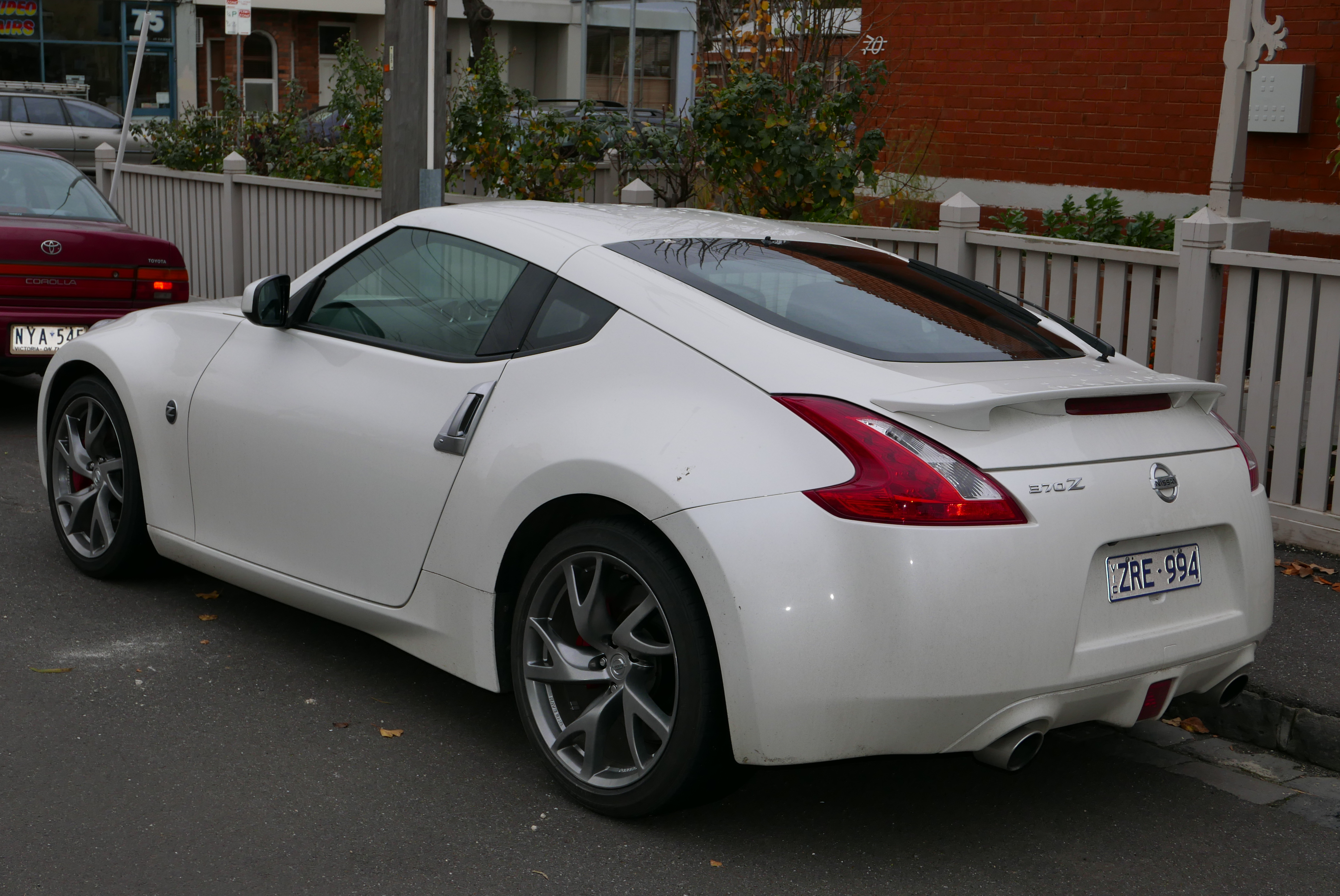
Facelift Nissan 370Z coupe (Australia)

The Nissan 370Z was updated in 2012 for the 2013 model year. The refresh included a new front fascia with vertical LED daytime running lights (except NISMO 370Z), new wheel designs, and a Sport Tech Package equipped with a touch-screen audio and navigation screen.

The new 370Z coupe was unveiled at the 2012 Chicago Auto Show, followed by the 2012 Paris Motor Show, where the 370Z Roadster was also introduced. Sales of the updated 370Z began in June 2012.

The Fairlady Z NISMO Z-Challenge Spec is a race car based on the Fairlady Z for the Z-Challenge single-spec race series. It was unveiled at the 2013 Tokyo Auto Salon.

=== Engines ===
Model	Years	Type/code	Power, torque at RPM
370Z (North America)	2009-	3,696 cc (226 cu in) V6 (VQ37VHR)	337 PS (248 kW; 332 hp) at 7000, 366 N⋅m (270 lb⋅ft) at 5200
NISMO 370Z	2012-	3,696 cc (226 cu in) V6 (VQ37VHR (NISMO Version))	355 PS (261 kW; 350 hp) at 7400, 374 N⋅m (276 lb⋅ft) at 5200
370Z NISMO (North America)	2013-	3,696 cc (226 cu in) V6 (VQ37VHR (NISMO Version))	355 PS (261 kW; 350 hp) at 7400, 374 N⋅m (276 lb⋅ft) at 5200
370Z NISMO (Europe)	2013-	3,696 cc (226 cu in) V6 (VQ37VHR (NISMO Version))	349 PS (257 kW; 344 hp) at 7400?, 374 N⋅m (276 lb⋅ft) at 5200?
Fairlady Z (Japan)	2012-	3,696 cc (226 cu in) V6 (VQ37VHR)	336 PS (247 kW; 331 hp) at 7000, 365 N⋅m (269 lb⋅ft) at 5200
Fairlady Z Version NISMO	2012-	3,696 cc (226 cu in) V6 (VQ37VHR (NISMO Version))	355 PS (261 kW; 350 hp) at 7400, 374 N⋅m (276 lb⋅ft) at 5200
Fairlady Z NISMO	2013-	3,696 cc (226 cu in) V6 (VQ37VHR (NISMO Version))	355 PS (261 kW; 350 hp) at 7400, 374 N⋅m (276 lb⋅ft) at 5200

=== Transmissions ===
Model	Years	Types
370Z (North America)	2012-	Coupe: 6-speed manual, 7-speed automatic Roadster: 6-speed manual (touring only), 7-speed automatic
370Z NISMO (North America)	2013-	6-speed manual, 7-speed automatic, (2015–2020)
370Z NISMO (Europe)	2013-	6-speed manual
Fairlady Z Version (Japan)	2012-	coupe: 6-speed manual (base, Version T, Version ST), 7-speed automatic (base, Version S, Version ST) roadster: 6-speed manual (Version T, Version ST), 7-speed automatic (base, Version ST)
Fairlady Z Version NISMO (Japan)	2012-	6-speed manual, 7-speed automatic
Fairlady Z NISMO (Japan)	2013-	6-speed manual, 7-speed automatic

The 7-speed automatic transmission includes a manual shift mode, paddle shifters and Downshift Rev Matching. The 6-speed manual transmission includes SynchroRev Match synchronized Downshift Rev Matching system.

=== Equipment ===
- US trims: 370Z (base), Touring, Sport, Sport Tech, NISMO, NISMO Tech (2017–2018 only)
- Japan trims: Fairlady Z (base (coupe, roadster 6MT)), Fairlady Z Version S (coupe 6MT), Fairlady Z Version ST, Fairlady Z Version T (7AT), Fairlady Z Version NISMO, Fairlady Z NISMO

=== Marketing ===
As part of the Nissan 370Z campaign, a series of 6 Heisman House TV commercials were produced, featuring previous Heisman Trophy winners. Nissan 370Z Roadster was featured in the 'Hula' commercial.

== Awards and recognition ==
- 2009 Japan Car of the Year (Most Fun)
- JD Power and Associates Highest Ranked Compact Premium Sporty Car in Initial Quality 2009
- Kelley Blue Book's Best Resale Value Award (2010)
- Consumers Digest Automotive Best Buy Award
- Best of What’s New by Popular Science
- Best Performance Roadster by Southern Automotive Media Association (2017)

== Sales ==
Calendar Year	U.S.	Canada	Mexico	Europe
2009	13,117	567	69	1,032
2010	10,215	899	44	2,211
2011	7,328	453	24	1,458
2012	7,338	489	53	1,029
2013	6,561	452	61	754
2014	7,199	411	94	669
2015	7,391	688	173	760
2016	5,913	932	134	842
2017	4,614	965	147	894
2018	3,468	700	103	701
2019	2,384	500	67	562
2020	1,954	263	48	324

== See also ==
- List of Nissan vehicles
