= Volkmar Weber =

German musician

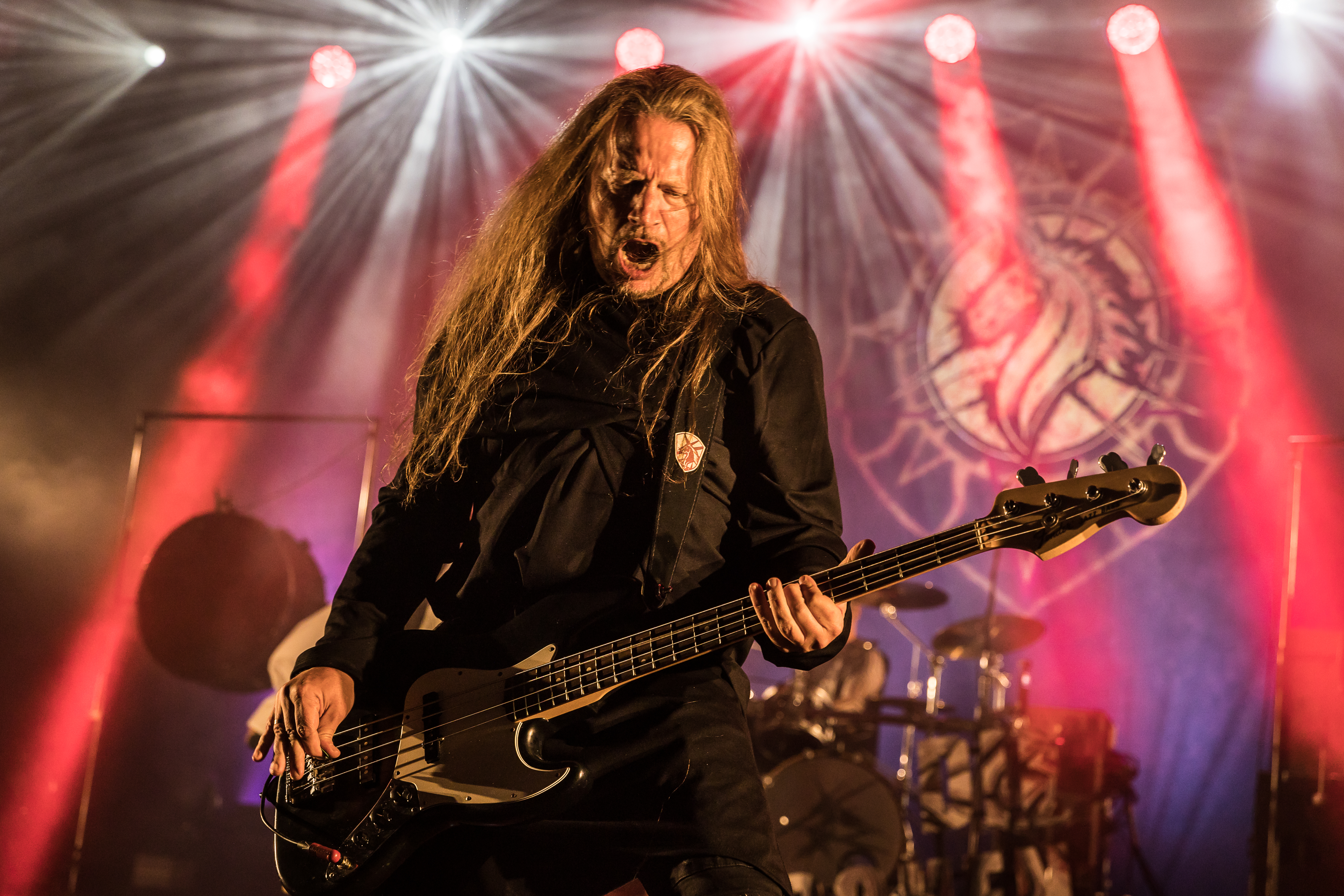
Volk-Man, 2025 in concert, Metal Frenzy Open Air Gardelegen

Volk-Man (civilname: Volkmar Weber, born 9 January 1974 in Weimar) is a German bassist and vocalist. He plays for Die Apokalyptischen Reiter and writes for the German metal magazines Legacy (formerly Deftone) and Rock Hard. He was also the main editor of the (in-)famous German underground fanzine Cothurnus.

== Discography with Die Apokalyptischen Reiter ==
=== Album ===
- 1997 – Soft & Stronger
- 1999 – Allegro Barbaro
- 2000 – All You Need Is Love
- 2003 – Have a Nice Trip
- 2004 – Samurai
- 2006 – Riders on the Storm
- 2008 – Licht
- 2011 – Moral & Wahnsinn
- 2014 – Tief.Tiefer
- 2017 – Der Rote Reiter

=== Demos ===
- 1996 – Firestorm (Demo)

=== EP ===
- 1998 – Dschinghis Khan (EP)
- 2006 – Friede sei mit dir (EP)
- 2008 – Der Weg (EP)

=== DVD ===
- 2006 – Friede sei mit Dir (Live-DVD)
- 2008 – Tobsucht (DVD and 2 Live-CDs)
