= Voelk =

Völk or Voelk is a surname.

- Christopher Völk (born 1988), German judoka
- Elisabeth Völk (born 1946), after whom asteroid 6189 Völk was named
- George Voelk (born September 28, 1962) is a Canadian former professional football player
- Josef Völk (born 1948), German ice hockey player

== See also ==
- 6189 Völk, an asteroid in the main-belt
- Volk
