= Wüllenweber =

Wüllenweber or Wullenweber is a German-language surname and a derivative of the personal name Volk. It may refer to:

- Jurgen Wullenweber (1492–1537), mayor of Lübeck
- Maria Therese von Wüllenweber (1833–1907), German Roman Catholic nun
