= Charles Conrad Abbott =

American archaeologist and naturalist

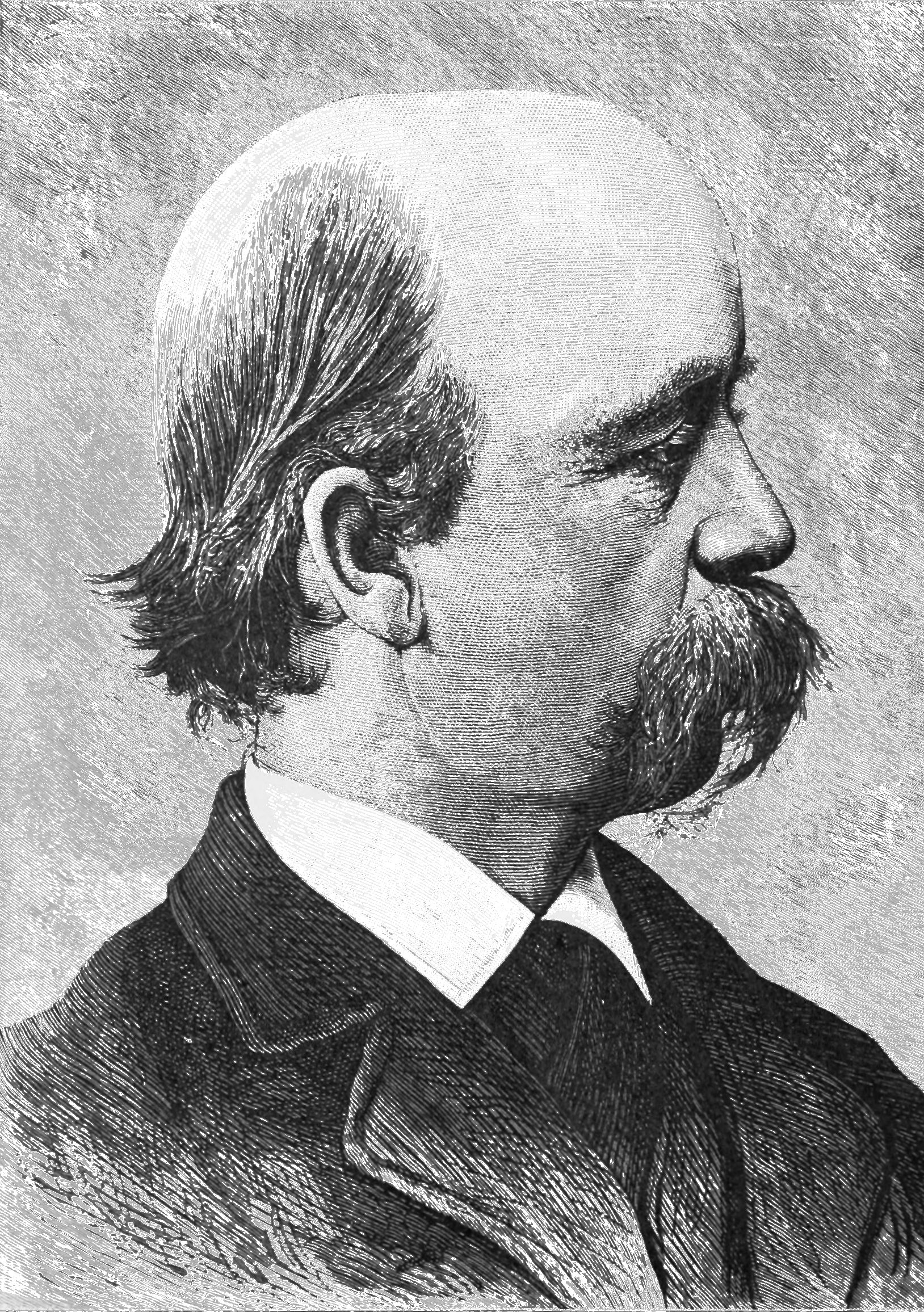
- Charles Conrad Abbott as depicted in Popular Science Monthly
- Born: June 4, 1843; Trenton (United States)
- Died: July 27, 1919 (aged 76); Bristol (United States)
- Alma mater: University of Pennsylvania; Trenton Academy
- Occupation: Archaeologist, naturalist, writer
- Employer: Peabody Museum of Archaeology and Ethnology (1876–1889); University of Pennsylvania (1889–)
- Parent(s): Timothy Abbott

Charles Conrad Abbott (June 4, 1843 – July 27, 1919) was an American archaeologist and naturalist.

== Biography ==
Abbott was born at Trenton, New Jersey, son of Timothy and Susan (Conrad) Abbott; grandson of Joseph and Anne (Rickey) Abbott, and a descendant of John and Anne (Mauleverer) Abbott, settlers, from England, in New Jersey in 1684. He studied medicine at the University of Pennsylvania School of Medicine. During the American Civil War, he served as a surgeon in the Union Army. He received his M.D. degree from University of Pennsylvania in 1865, but never entered into the practice of the profession.

In 1876, he announced the discovery, later confirmed by other archaeologists, of traces of human presence in the Delaware River Valley dating from the first or "Kansan" ice age, and inferentially from the pre-glacial period when humans are believed to have entered upon the North American continent. However, today the consensus of archaeologists is that most of Abbott's "Trenton Gravel Implements" date from the Middle Woodland period of about A.D. 300–900. From 1876 to 1889, he was assistant curator of the Peabody Museum in Cambridge, Massachusetts, to which he presented a collection of 20,000 archaeological specimens; he freely gave also to other archaeological collections. From 1890 to 1894 he served as the first curator of the University of Pennsylvania's newly organized Department of American Archaeology.

He was a corresponding member of the Boston Society of Natural History, a member of the American Philosophical Society of Philadelphia, and a fellow of the Royal Society of Antiquaries of the North in Copenhagen. In 1919 he died at the age of 76 years in Bristol, Pennsylvania, where he had moved after the burning of his New Jersey home a few years before.

== Writings ==
His book Primitive Industry: Illustrations of the Hand-work in Stone, Bone, and Clay of the Native Races of the Northern Atlantic Seaboard of America (Salem, 1881) detailed his hypothesis arguing for the presence of pre-glacial man in the Delaware Valley. He was well known as a frequent contributor to the American Naturalist, Science, Nature, Science News, and Popular Science Monthly. He also published many books on outdoor observation, such as A Naturalist's Rambles about Home (1884).

== Bibliography ==
- Catalogue of Vertebrate Animals of New Jersey (1868 - in Geology of New Jersey, ed. George H. Cook)
- The Stone Age in New Jersey (1876)
- Primitive Industry: or Illustrations of the Handiwork, in Stone, Bone and Clay, of the Native Races of the Northern Atlantic Seaboard of America (1881)
- The Paleolithic Implements of the Valley of the Delaware (1881)
- Archaeological Frauds in The Popular Science Monthly (1885)
- Upland and Meadow (1886)
- Waste Land Wanderings (1887)
- Days Out of Doors (1889)
- Outings at Odd Times (1890)
- Recent Archaeological Explorations in the Valley of the Delaware (1892)
- A Naturalists' Rambles About Home (1894 - 2nd Edition)
- The Birds About Us (1894)
- Travels in a Tree-Top (1894)
- A Colonial Wooing (1895)
- Notes of the Night And Other Outdoor Sketches (1896)
- The Freedom of the Fields (1898)
- Clear Skies and Cloudy (1899)
- In Nature's Realm (1900)
- Bird-Land Echoes (1904)
- Rambles of an Idler (1906)
- Archæologia Nova Cæsarea (1907–09)
- Ten Years' Diggings in Lenape Land (1901–11)

== See also ==
- Ernest Volk
