= Die Apokalyptischen Reiter =

German heavy metal band

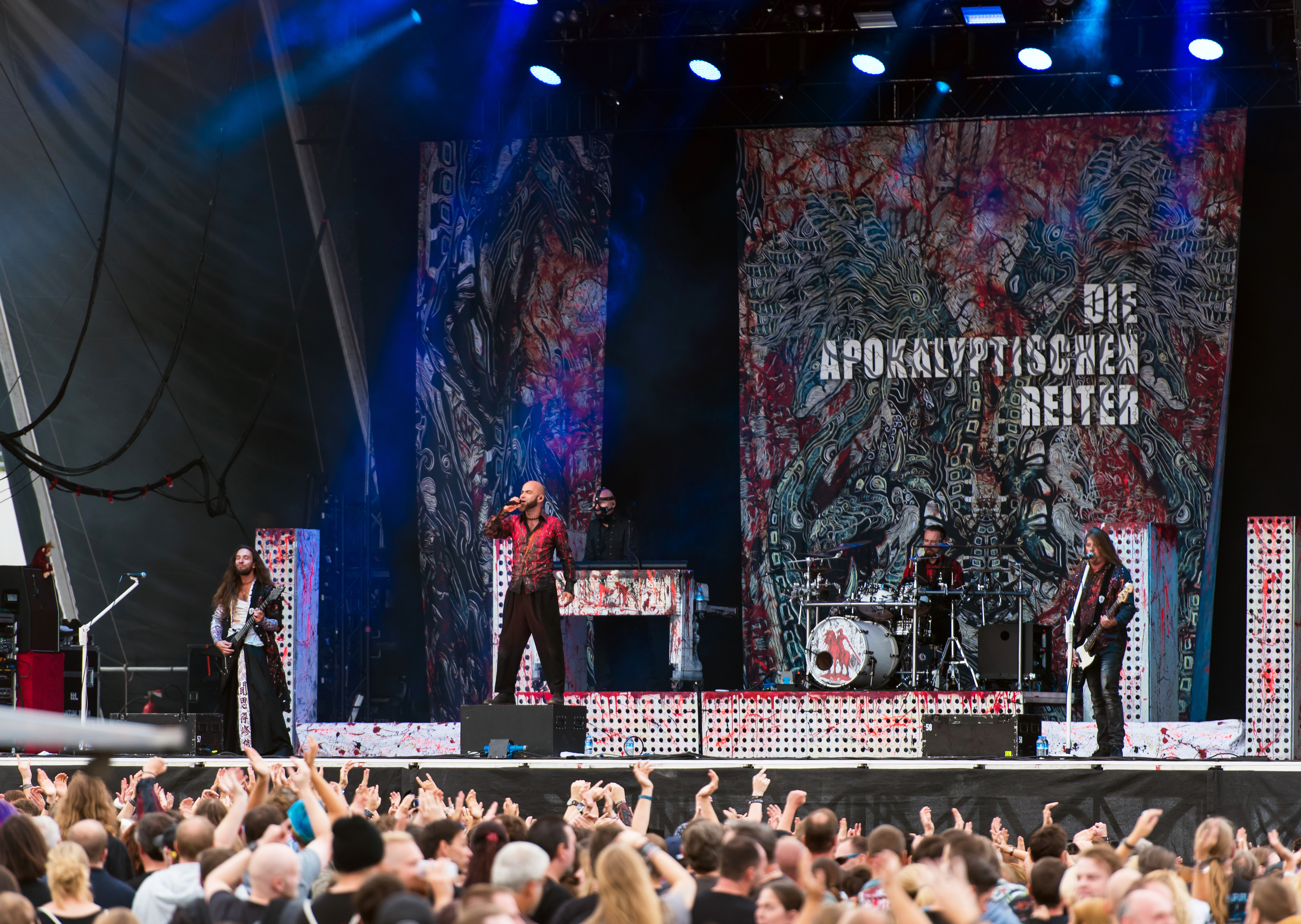
- Die Apokalyptischen Reiter at Hamburg Fest 2018

Background information
- Origin: Apolda, Germany
- Genres: Melodic death metal Avant-garde metal Folk metal Power metal Symphonic metal
- Years active: 1995–present
- Labels: Nuclear Blast, The End
- Members: Fuchs; Volk-Man; Rohgarr; Titus Maximus
- Past members: Skelleton; Pitrone; Lady Cat-man
- Website: reitermania.de

Die Apokalyptischen Reiter (German for "The Apocalyptic Riders") is a German heavy metal band formed in Apolda in December 26th 1995.

== Members ==
Current line-up

- Fuchs (Daniel Täumel) – lead vocals, rhythm guitar (1995–present)
- Volk-Man (Volkmar Weber) – bass, screamed vocals (1995–present)
- Titus Maximus – lead guitar (2023–present)
- Rohgarr (Euch Rohgarr) – Drums (2023–present)

Former members

- Skelleton – drums, screamed vocals (1995–2000)
- Pitrone (Peter Pfau) – lead guitar (2002–2008)
- Lady Cat-Man (Cathleen Gliemann) – lead guitar (2008–2009)
- Dr. Pest (Mark Szakul) – keyboards (1995–2021)
- Sir G. (Georg Lenhardt) – drums (2000–2023)
- Ady (Adrian Vogel) – lead guitar (2009–2023)

Timeline

Die Apokalyptischen Reiter, band members at Rockharz 2026

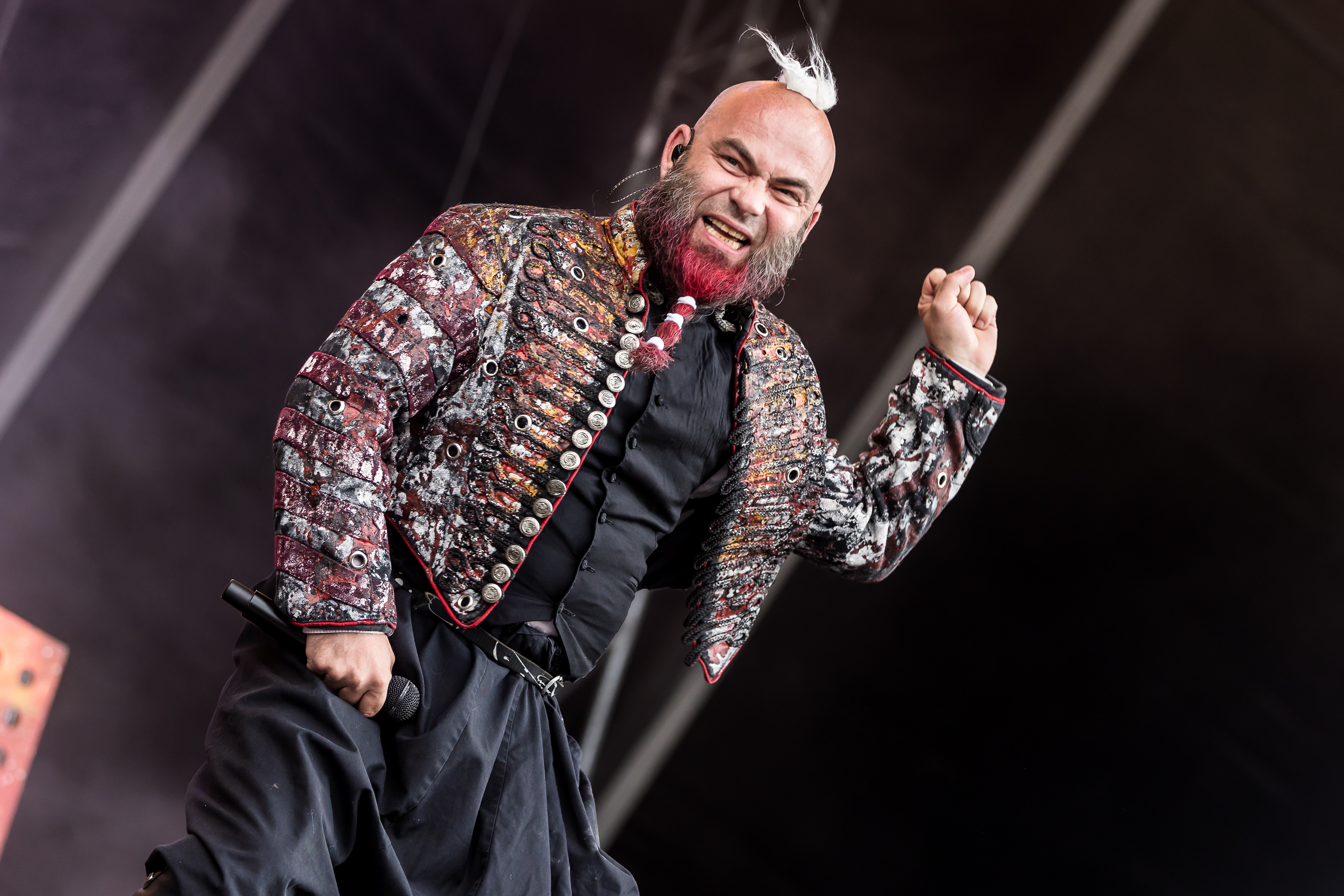
Daniel „Fuchs“ Täumel, vocals

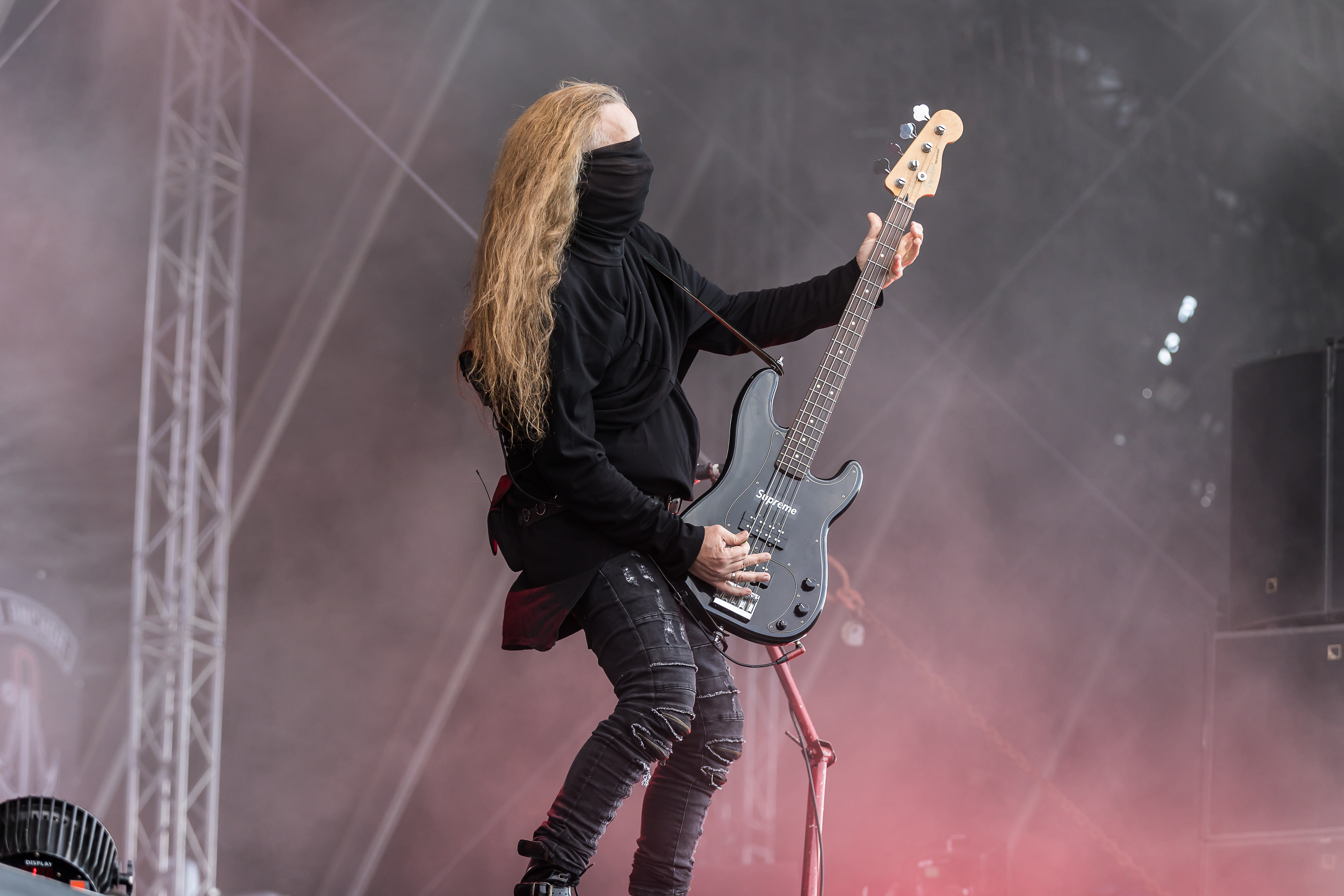
Volkmar „Volk-Man“ Weber, bass

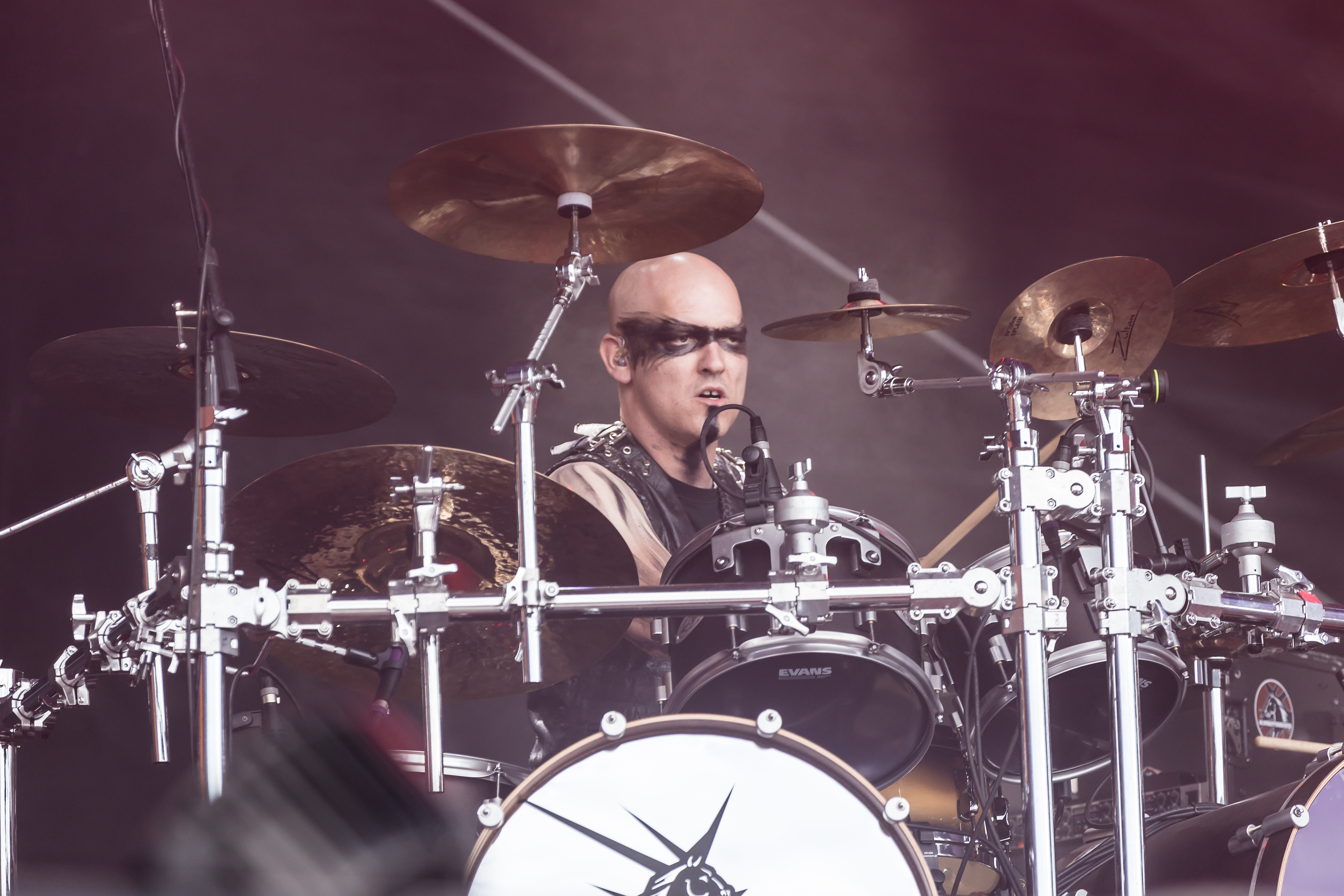
Ronald „Rohgarr“ Garz, drums

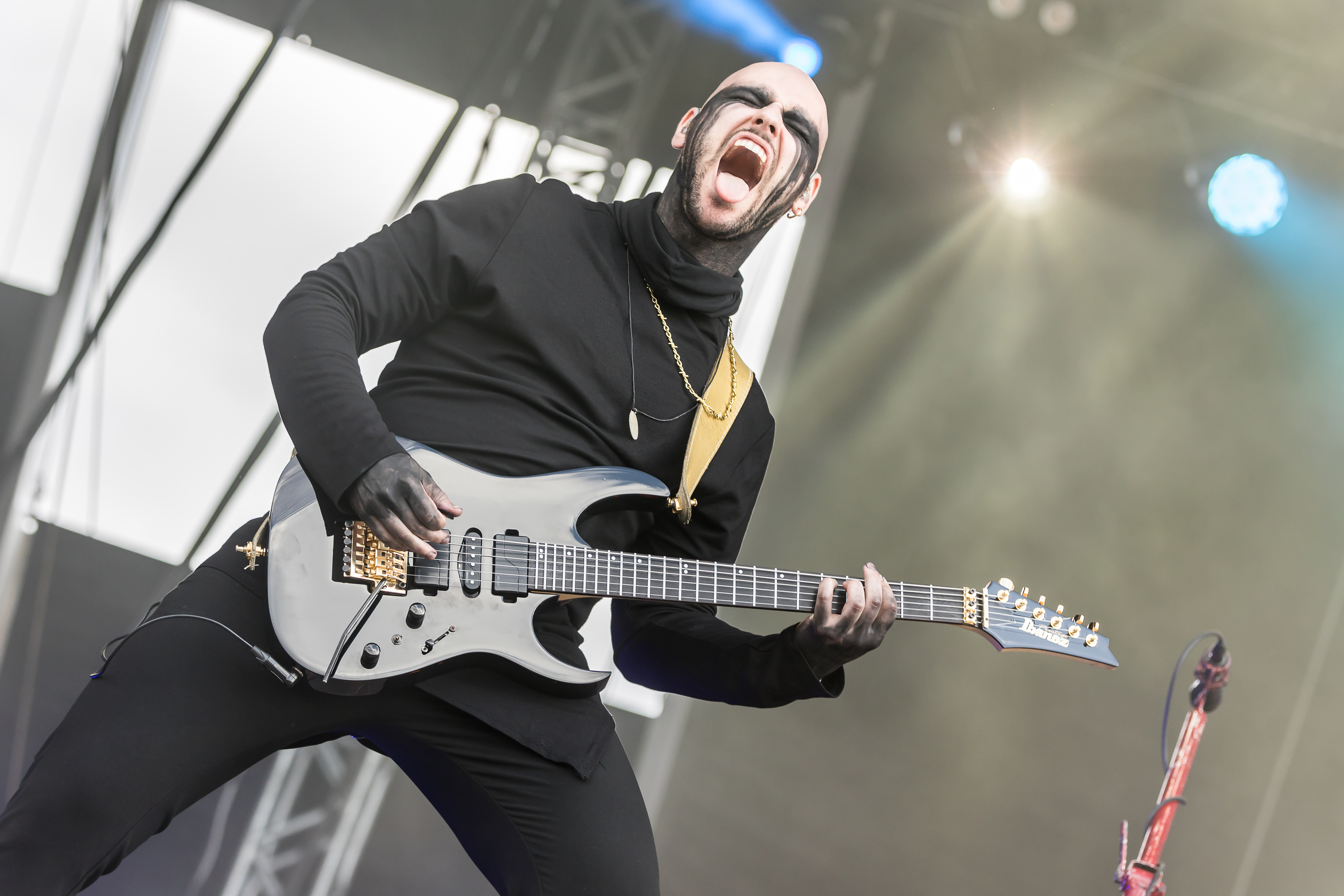
Titus „Titus Maximus“ Garz, guitar

== Discography ==
Albums:

- 1997 – Soft & Stronger
- 1999 – Allegro Barbaro
- 2000 – All You Need Is Love
- 2003 – Have a Nice Trip (#95 in Germany)
- 2004 – Samurai
- 2006 – Riders on the Storm (#31 in Germany, #74 in Austria)
- 2008 – Licht (#29 in Germany, #49 in Austria, #88 in Switzerland)
- 2011 – Moral & Wahnsinn (#18 in Germany, # 41 in Austria, #61 in Switzerland)
- 2014 – Tief.Tiefer (#22 in Germany, #72 in Switzerland)
- 2017 – Der Rote Reiter (#10 in Germany, # 29 in Austria)
- 2021 – The Divine Horsemen
- 2022 – Wilde Kinder
- 2025 – Die Wanderer (Live)
- 2025 – Freie Republik Reitermania

Demos:

- 1996 – Firestorm

EPs:

- 1998 – Dschinghis Khan
- 2006 – Friede sei mit dir
- 2008 – Der Weg
- 2024 – Die Mutter des Teufels
- 2025 – Rache an Der Wirklichkeit
- 2025 – Die Schatzinel

DVDs:

- 2006 – Friede sei mit dir (live-DVD)
- 2008 – Tobsucht (DVD and two live-CDs)
- 2009 – Adrenalin
