= Volkmar Denner =

German business executive

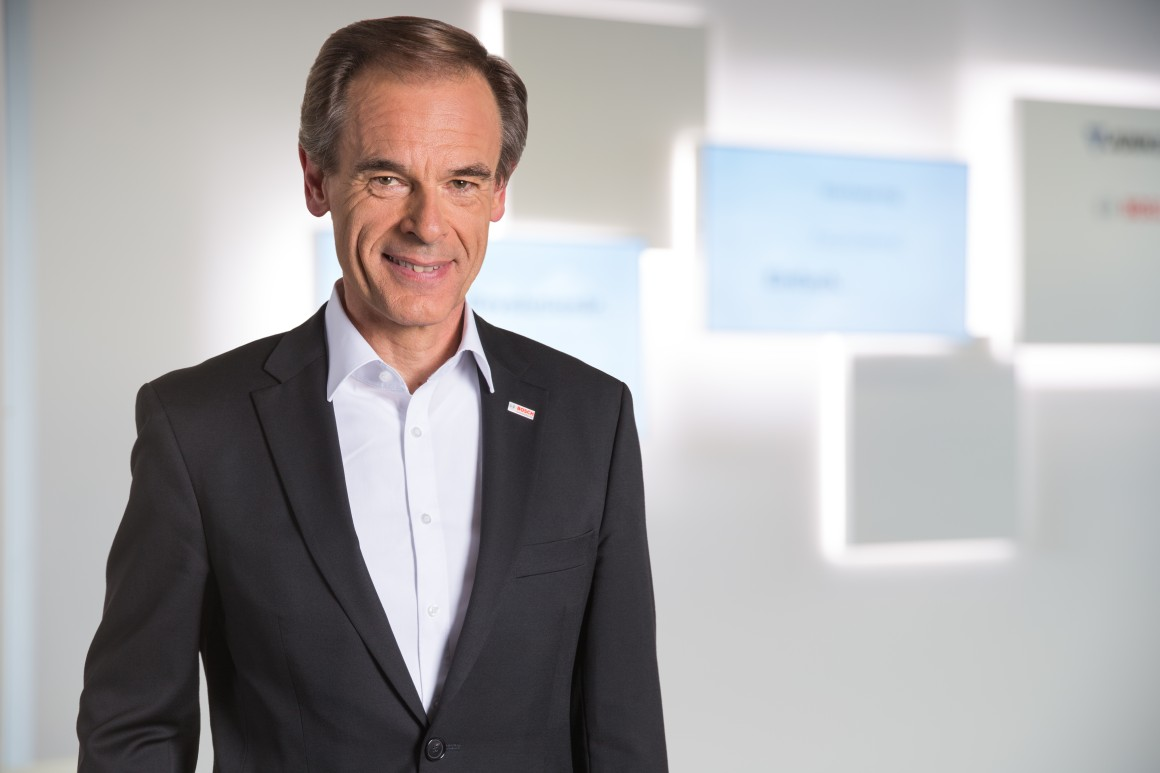
Volkmar Denner 2017

Dr. Volkmar Denner (born 30 November 1956 in Uhingen) is a German business executive who was the CEO of Robert Bosch GmbH from 2012 July to 2021 December.

== Education ==
Denner graduated with a doctorate in physics from the University of Stuttgart.

== Career ==
Denner has spent his whole career with Bosch. In 2012, when he was head of research and engineering, beat out auto parts chief Bernd Bohr to replace incumbent Franz Fehrenbach in a move that made him only the seventh CEO since Bosch was founded in 1886.

During the Hannover Messe in April 2016, Denner was among the 15 German CEOs who were invited to a private dinner with President Barack Obama.

== Other activities ==
- Baden-Badener Unternehmer-Gespräche (BBUG), Member of the Board
- Deutscher Zukunftspreis, Member of the Board of Trustees
- German Association of the Automotive Industry (VDA), Member of the Managing Board
