= Riders on the Storm (album) =

Studio album by Die Apokalyptischen Reiter
- Released: 25 August 2006
- Genres: Melodic death metal, folk metal, symphonic metal, avant-garde metal
- Label: Nuclear Blast Records

Die Apokalyptischen Reiter chronology
Samurai (2004)	Riders on the Storm (2006)	Licht (2008)

Riders on the Storm is the sixth studio album by the German heavy metal band Die Apokalyptischen Reiter, released by Nuclear Blast Records on 25 August 2006. It peaked at #31 in the German Media Control Charts.

== Track listing ==
1. "Friede Sei Mit Dir" – 2:56
2. "Riders on the Storm" – 3:47
3. "Seemann" – 2:55
4. "Der Adler" – 2:50
5. "Revolution" – 4:26
6. "Wenn Ich Träume" – 3:08
7. "Soldaten Dieser Erde" – 3:28
8. "In the Land of White Horses" – 2:27
9. "Liebe" – 4:19
10. "Schenk Mir Heut Nacht" – 3:01
11. "Himmelskind" – 3:33
12. "Feuer" – 3:27
13. "Mmmh" – 5:00
14. "Peace May Be with You" – 2:59
