= Volkmer =

Volkmer is a German surname, derived from the given name Volkmar. Notable people with the surname include:

- Dominic Volkmer (born 1996), German footballer
- Harold Volkmer (1931–2011), American politician
- Heinz Volkmer (fl. 1920s–1930s), Austrian bobsledder
- José Mauro Volkmer de Castilho (1946–1998), Brazilian scientist, teacher and researcher
- Karl Volkmer (1922–2023), Swiss sprinter
- Werner Volkmer (1944–2020), German-Canadian filmmaker

== See also ==
- McClure-Volkmer
- Vollmer
