= Emily Volk =

American pathologist

- Born: Kansas City, Missouri, U.S.
- Education: University of Missouri–Kansas City; University of Massachusetts
- Children: 4
- Scientific career
- Fields: Pathology
- Workplaces: Long School of Medicine

Emily Ellen Volk is an American pathologist and hospital administrator who has served as the chief medical officer at Baptist Health in South Indiana since 2021. She is the 37th president of the College of American Pathologists.

== Life ==
Volk is from Kansas City, Missouri. She earned a bachelor's degree and M.D. (1993) from the University of Missouri–Kansas City. She completed a residency in anatomic and clinical pathology and conducted a surgical pathology fellowship at the Cleveland Clinic. She conducted a fellowship in cytopathology at the Beaumont Hospital, Royal Oak. Volk earned an M.B.A. at the University of Massachusetts.

Volk served as the senior vice president of clinical services at the University Health System for four years. She was a clinical assistant professor of pathology at the Long School of Medicine. On March 29, 2021, Volk became the chief medical officer at Baptist Health in South Indiana. On September 25, 2021, she was sworn in as the 37th president of the College of American Pathologists.

Volk is married to pathologist Daniel Mais. They have four children.
