= Ernest Volk =

Ernest Volk (August 25, 1845 — September 15, 1919) was a German-born archaeologist and naturalist. He is best known for his twenty-two-year investigation of the early human occupation of the Delaware River Valley in the United States.

== Biography ==
Volk was born in Waldkirch, Germany, on August 25, 1845. He emigrated in 1867 and arrived in the United States that same year, spending the rest of his life in Trenton, New Jersey. In 1899, he began working for Frederic Ward Putnam of the Peabody Museum of Archaeology and Ethnology for two decades, helping to add to the collection through excavations of Trenton. In addition to his specimens at the Peabody Museum, Volk's contributions can also be found at the Field Museum of Natural History and the American Museum of Natural History, as well as at several universities. Volk was a curator of a collection he compiled at the World's Columbian Exposition in 1893.

Along with his colleague Charles Conrad Abbott, Volk is best known for his twenty-two year investigation of early human occupation of the Delaware Valley. In 1881, Charles Conrad Abbott hypothesized about a purported human presence in the Delaware River Valley. Volk analyzed glacial deposits known as the Trenton Gravels, excavating the area using a form of archaeological stratigraphy. His research in the area supported Abbott's hypothesis with evidence derived from his excavations. Volk published his findings in The Archaeology of the Delaware Valley (1911).

Volk died in a car accident in Tunkhannock, Pennsylvania, on September 15, 1919.

== Selected work ==
- Volk, Ernest. (1911). The Archaeology of the Delaware Valley. Peabody Museum of American Archaeology and Ethnology. Papers 5.

== Bibliography ==
- Cleary, John J. (1929) Journalism and Literature in Trenton. Chapter XV. Trenton Historical Society.
- Eggers, H. E. (Jan.-Mar., 1920). "Anthropological Notes". American Anthropologist. New Series, 22 (1): 97-99.
- Hinsley, Curtis M. Wilcox, David R. (2016). Coming of Age in Chicago: The 1893 World's Fair and the Coalescence of American Anthropology. University of Nebraska Press. ISBN 9780803268388.
- Lee Lyman, R. J. O'Brien, Michael J. (2006). Measuring Time with Artifacts: A History of Methods in American Archaeology. University of Nebraska Press. ISBN 0803229666.
- Mann, Charles C. (2005). 1491: New Revelations of the Americas Before Columbus. Random House. ISBN 1-4000-3205-9.
