= Volkmar I of Corvey =

Abbot of Corvey from 916 to 942

Volkmar I (also Folkmar; Latin: Volkmarus) was abbot of Corvey from 916 until his death in 942. His abbacy is documented in several monastic and royal sources produced during and after his tenure, especially in a list of professed monks and a royal charter that addressed the monastery's rights and obligations.

== Life ==
Volkmar held the abbacy of Corvey between 916 and 942. His abbacy is attested in a royal charter issued by Otto I in 940, which reassigned to him the authority and responsibility of the royal Burgbann. Under this grant, Folkmar was empowered to mobilise the local population for the maintenance and defence of the royal fortification at Corvey. The authority conferred on him was extensive, encompassing the entire population of three pagi that had previously fallen under the jurisdiction of local counts for defensive matters.

A list of professed monks from Corvey, whose initial version was compiled shortly after Volkmar's election and blessing, was maintained until the early 11th century.
