= 6189 Völk =

Stony Vesta asteroid

Discovery
- Discovered by: E. W. Elst
- Discovery site: La Silla Obs.
- Discovery date: 2 March 1989

Designations
- Named after: Elisabeth Völk (ESO staff member)
- Alternative designations: 1989 EY_{2} · 1980 TY_{4} 5489 T-2
- Minor planet category: main-belt · (inner); Vesta

Orbital characteristics
- Epoch 31 May 2020 (JD 2459000.5)
- Uncertainty parameter 0
- Observation arc: 46.34 yr (16,926 d)
- Aphelion: 2.6157 AU
- Perihelion: 1.9938 AU
- Semi-major axis: 2.3048 AU
- Eccentricity: 0.1349
- Orbital period (sidereal): 3.498 yr (1,277.6 d)
- Mean anomaly: 164.96°
- Mean motion: 0° 16^{m} 54.12^{s} / day
- Inclination: 5.9423°
- Longitude of ascending node: 245.32°
- Argument of perihelion: 68.736°

Physical characteristics
- Mean diameter: 3.982±0.156 km
- Synodic rotation period: 2.896±0.001 h (Note: Lightcurve plot of (6189) Völk by Robert Stephens at the Center for Solar System Studies (2015). Rotation period of (2.896±0.001) hours with a brightness amplitude of 0.18±0.02 mag. Quality code of 3. Summary figures at the LCDB and CS3 web pages.)
- Geometric albedo: 0.443±0.079
- Spectral type: S (SDSS-MOC)
- Absolute magnitude (H): 13.50; 13.6

6189 Völk (prov. designation: 1989 EY_{2}) is a stony Vesta asteroid, approximately 4 kilometers (2.5 miles) in diameter, located in the inner regions of the asteroid belt. It was discovered on 2 March 1989, by Belgian astronomer Eric Elst at the La Silla Observatory in northern Chile. The S-type asteroid has a short rotation period of 2.9 hours. It was named for Elisabeth Völk, a staff member at ESO headquarters in Germany.

== Classification and orbit ==
When applying the synthetic hierarchical clustering method to its proper orbital elements, Völk is a core member of the stony Vesta family, one of the largest families in the inner asteroid belt. It orbits the Sun in the inner main-belt at a distance of 2.0–2.6 AU once every 3 years and 6 months (1,278 days; semi-major axis of 2.3 AU). Its orbit has an eccentricity of 0.13 and an inclination of 6° with respect to the ecliptic. It was first observed as 5489 T-2 at Palomar Observatory during the second Palomar–Leiden Trojan survey in September 1973, extending the asteroid's observation arc by almost 16 years prior to its official discovery at La Silla.

== Naming ==
This minor planet was named after Elisabeth Völk (born 1946), administrative staff member at ESO's headquarters in Germany, in charge of the ESO Schmidt plates archive, who became a good friend of the discoverer. The naming was independently suggested by astronomer and author of the Dictionary of Minor Planets, Lutz Schmadel. The naming citation was published by the Minor Planet Center on 15 February 1995 (M.P.C. 24766).

== Physical characteristics ==
In the SDSS-based taxonomy, Völk is a common, stony S-type asteroid.

== Lightcurve ==
In September 2015, a rotational lightcurve was constructed from photometric observations by Robert D. Stephens at the Center for Solar System Studies in California (U81). Lightcurve analysis gave a well-defined rotation period of 2.896±0.001 hours with a brightness amplitude of 0.18±0.02 in magnitude (U=3).

== Diameter ==
According to the survey carried out by the NEOWISE mission of NASA's Wide-field Infrared Survey Explorer, the asteroid measures (3.982±0.156) kilometers in diameter and its surface has an outstandingly high albedo of (0.443±0.079), while the Collaborative Asteroid Lightcurve Link assumes an albedo of 0.24 – in accordance with the LCDB's divergent classification into the Flora family – and calculates a larger diameter of 5.2 kilometers.
