= Licht (Die Apokalyptischen Reiter album) =

Studio album by Die Apokalyptischen Reiter
- Released: 29 August 2008
- Genre: Melodic death metal, folk metal, symphonic metal
- Label: Nuclear Blast Records
- Producer: Vincent Sorg and Die Apokalyptischen Reiter

Die Apokalyptischen Reiter chronology
Riders on the Storm (2006)	Licht (2008)	Moral & Wahnsinn (2011)

Licht is the seventh studio album by the German heavy metal band Die Apokalyptischen Reiter, released by Nuclear Blast Records on 29 August 2008. It peaked at number 29 in the German Media Control Charts. The U.S. version of Licht (2009) comes with six bonus tracks (2 studio, 4 live) and different album art.

== Track listing ==
- Lyrics by Fuchs. Music by Die Apokalyptischen Reiter.
1. "Es Wird Schlimmer" – 4:07
2. "Auf Die Liebe" – 3:09
3. "Wir Sind Das Licht" – 3:03
4. "Nach Der Ebbe" – 3:33
5. "Adrenalin" – 3:42
6. "Der Elende" – 5:32
7. "Heut´ Ist Der Tag" – 2:46
8. "Wir Hoffen" – 3:54
9. "Der Weg" – 3:30
10. "Ein Lichtlein" – 4:25
11. "Auferstehen Soll In Herrlichkeit" – 4:36

== North American track listing ==
1. "Es Wird Schlimmer" – 4:12
2. "Auf Die Liebe" – 3:14
3. "Wir Sind Das Licht" – 3:07
4. "Nach Der Ebbe" – 3:38
5. "Adrenalin" – 3:47
6. "Der Elende" – 5:36
7. "Heut' Ist Der Tag" – 2:50
8. "Wir Hoffen" – 3:58
9. "Der Weg" – 3:35
10. "Ein Lichtlein" – 4:29
11. "Auferstehen Soll In Herrlichkeit" – 4:41

(Bonus tracks)

1. "Ich Suche" – 4:20
2. "Adrenalin" (Monstermix) – 2:56
3. "Wir Sind Das Licht (Live) – 3:30
4. "Es Wird Schlimmer (Live) – 4:35
5. "Der Weg (Live) – 3:56
6. "Nach Der Ebbe (Live) – 3:36

== Personnel ==
- Fuchs: Guitars, Vocals
- Lady Cat-Man: Guitars
- Dr. Pest: Keyboards
- Volk-Man: Bass
- Sir G.: Drums, Percussion
