= Rays Wheels =

Japanese wheel manufacturer

Rays Co., Ltd.

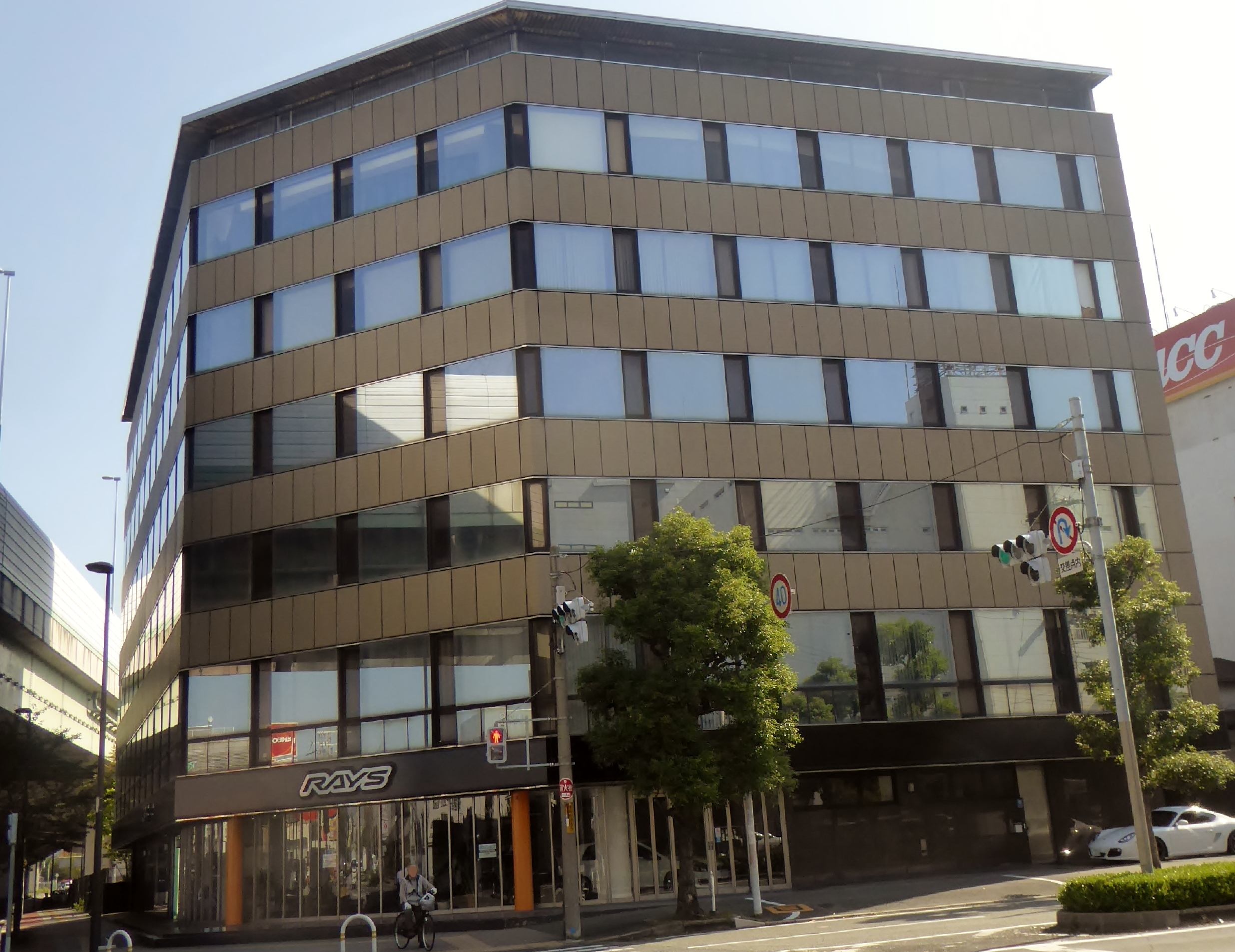
- Headquarters of Rays Wheels at Higashiōsaka
- Native name: 株式会社レイズ
- Romanized name: Kabushiki-gaisha Reizu
- Company type: Private KK
- Industry: Automotive aftermarket
- Founded: 1973; 53 years ago
- Headquarters: Higashiosaka-shi, Osaka Prefecture, Japan
- Area served: Worldwide
- Key people: Masumi Shiba (CEO)
- Products: Wheels
- Subsidiaries: Rays Engineering
- Website: www.rayswheels.co.jp

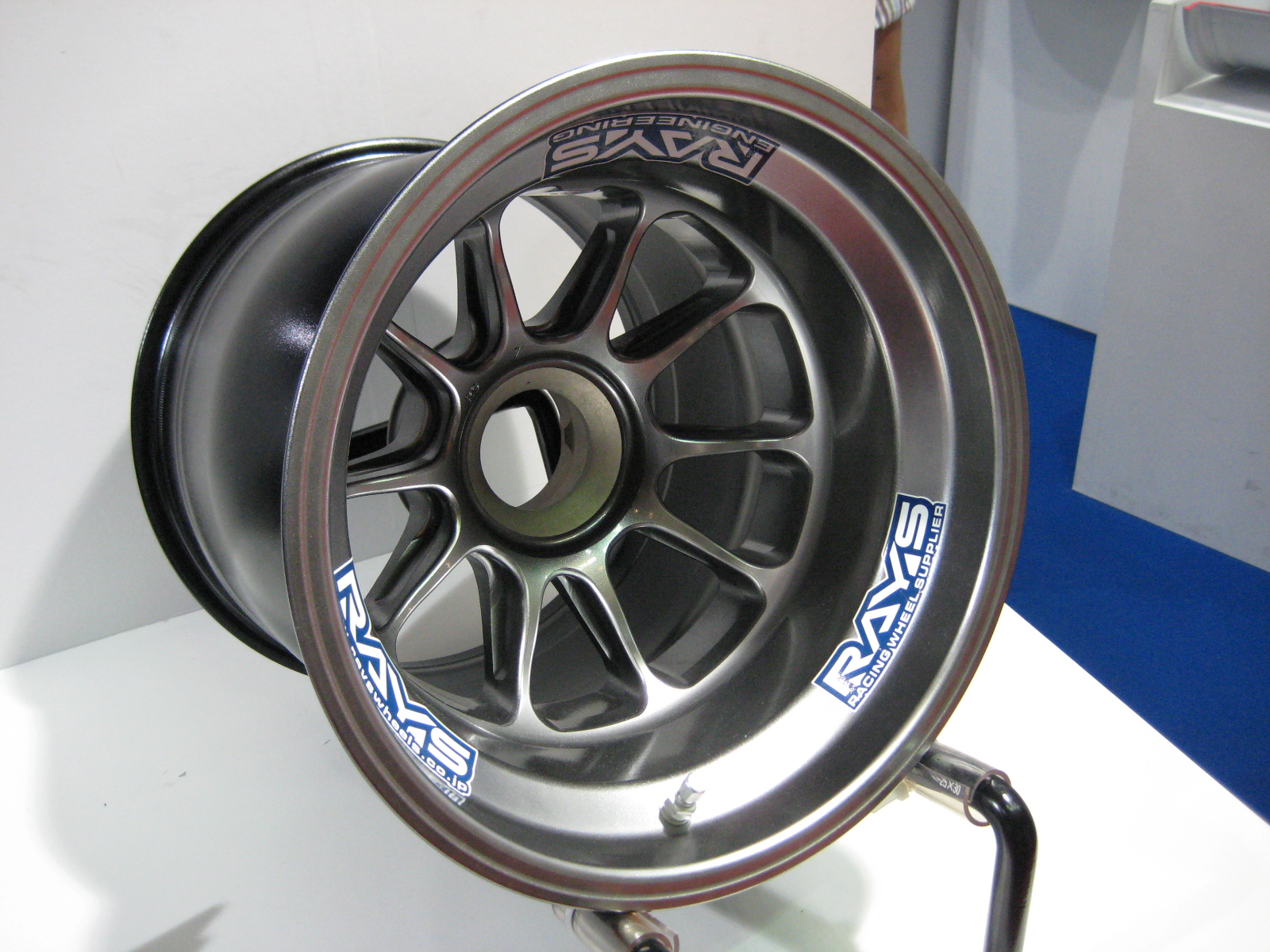
Rays produced rear wheel belonging to a Williams Formula One car.

Rays Co., Ltd. (株式会社レイズ, Kabushiki-gaisha Reizu) is a Japanese wheel manufacturer for both motorsport and street use. Their flagship brand, Volk Racing, features a forging process exclusive to Rays Engineering.

== Wheel construction ==
Rays wheels are manufactured through two different processes: forging and casting. After each wheel is manufactured, the wheel goes through inspection before being packaged and shipped out.

=== Forging ===
The forging process for a Rays Wheel consists of seven steps:

1. Hot Forging – Takes a billet and creates metal lines through volume distribution with a hot press.
2. RM Forging – Forging method exclusively developed Rays Engineering. Finishing of designed parts on the wheel is completed during this process.
3. Cold Spinning – Width of wheel is constructed during this process with a high-speed spinning machine.
4. Heat Treatment – Wheel is quickly heated then immediately cooled down with a solution to form a strong structure for the wheel.
5. Machine Work – Special cutting device used to improve roundness of the wheel.
6. Shot Blast – This process smooths the surface of the wheel to prepare of aesthetic finishing.
7. Surface Finishing – Various chemicals are used to prevent corrosion and protect the surface of the wheel

== Products ==
- Volk Racing – Flagship forged sport wheels brand name of Rays Engineering.
- Gram Lights – Lightweight wheels manufactured through casting process.
- Eco Drive Gear – Lightweight wheels focused on being eco friendly.
- 57 Motor Sport – Cast racing wheels used in World Touring Car Championship and British Touring Car Championship.
- Versus – Fashion brand of wheels with influences from European styling.
- G-Games – Wheels used in the JDM scene with influences from American styling.
- Daytona – Performance wheels produced for Japanese kei cars.
- Black Fleet – Japan's dress-up culture for the sedan scene brings the newest design with a tuner taste.
- Garcia – Wheels bringing in the latest design trends for vans and kei cars.
- A/X RePLA/Y – The Arthur Exchange brand is revamped from 2010 with fresh new design wheels.
- Vesta
- Sebring – also the Japanese distributor for its exhaust pipes

They are the current wheel suppliers to winning factory race teams of Nissan, Honda, Toyota, and Mazda in racing series such as Super GT, Japanese Touring Car Championship (JTCC), British Touring Car Championship (BTCC), Formula Nippon, Formula D, and Formula One. Their Volk Racing wheels are popular with owners of sport compact and import cars on the race and show circuits.

Rays Engineering also manufactures wheels for car manufacturers' in-house tuning teams such as Nismo, Ralliart, STi, Mazdaspeed and Toyota Racing Development and also supply wheels to Williams Formula One team as well as the cars that appeared in The Fast and the Furious: Tokyo Drift.
