= From Afar (album) =

Studio album by Ensiferum
- Released: 9 September 2009
- Recorded: April – May 2009 at Petrax and E-Major studios
- Genres: Folk metal, melodic death metal, power metal
- Length: 56:43
- Label: Spinefarm
- Producers: Tero Kinnunen; Janne Joutsenniemi; Hiili Hiilesmaa

Ensiferum chronology
Victory Songs (2007)	From Afar (2009)	Unsung Heroes (2012)

Singles from From Afar
- 1. "From Afar" Released: 6 August 2009; 2. "Stone Cold Metal" Released: 8 September 2010

From Afar is the fourth studio album by Finnish folk metal band Ensiferum, released on 9 September 2009 on Spinefarm Records. It is the band's first album to feature keyboardist Emmi Silvennoinen. The album was produced by Nightwish producer Tero Kinnunen and Victory Songs producer Janne Joutsenniemi. It was mixed by HIM producer Hiili Hiilesmaa. The limited edition of the album includes a cover of Swedish folk rock group Nordman.

Professional ratings
Review scores
Source	Rating
About.com	3.5/5 stars
Metal Review	9.2/10
Sputnikmusic	4/5 stars

== Track listing ==
No.	Title	Lyrics	Music	Length
1.	"By the Dividing Stream"		Markus Toivonen	3:50
2.	"From Afar"	Sami Hinkka	Markus Toivonen, Sami Hinkka	4:51
3.	"Twilight Tavern"	Sami Hinkka	Markus Toivonen, Sami Hinkka	5:38
4.	"Heathen Throne"	Sami Hinkka	Markus Toivonen	11:09
5.	"Elusive Reaches"	Sami Hinkka, Petri Lindroos	Petri Lindroos, Markus Toivonen	3:26
6.	"Stone Cold Metal"	Sami Hinkka	Markus Toivonen, Sami Hinkka	7:25
7.	"Smoking Ruins"	Sami Hinkka	Markus Toivonen	6:40
8.	"Tumman virran taa"	Sami Hinkka	Sami Hinkka	0:52
9.	"The Longest Journey (Heathen Throne Part II)"	Sami Hinkka	Markus Toivonen, Sami Hinkka	12:52
Total length:				56:43

Limited Edition bonus track
No.	Title	Lyrics	Music	Length
10.	"Vandraren" (Nordman cover, feat. Heri Joensen)	Py Bäckman, H. Bäckman	Mats Wester	3:41
Total length:				60:24

== Charts ==
Chart (2009)	Peak position
Finnish Albums Chart	9

== Personnel ==
=== Band members ===
- Petri Lindroos – guitars, harsh vocals
- Markus Toivonen – guitars, acoustic guitar, clean and backing vocals, banjo
- Sami Hinkka – bass, clean and backing vocals
- Janne Parviainen – drums
- Emmi Silvennoinen – keyboards, hammond, backing vocals

=== Guest members ===
- Heri Joensen - lead vocals (on "Vandraren")
- Kaisa Saari - female vocals (on "Twilight Tavern")
- Timo Väänänen - kantele
- Tobias Tåg - flute, tin whistles, recorder
- Olli Varis - mandolin, mandola
- Jenni Turku - recorder
- Olli Ahvenlahti - piano
- Lassi Logren - nyckelharpa
- Mikko P. Mustonen - orchestration, whistle
- Jukka-Pekka Miettinen - backing vocals

=== Production ===
- Tero Kinnunen – production
- Janne Joutsenniemi – production
- Hiili Hiilesmaa – mixing
- Kai Hahto – drum tech
