= 10th Anniversary Live =

Video by Ensiferum
- Released: 28 June 2006
- Recorded: 31 December 2005
- Venue: Nosturi, Helsinki, Finland
- Genre: Viking metal, folk metal
- Length: 104:13
- Label: Spinefarm

Professional ratings
Review scores
Source	Rating
Imperiumi	8+/10

10th Anniversary Live is a live video album by Finnish folk metal band Ensiferum celebrating the group's 10th anniversary. It was filmed on New Year's Eve 2005 at the music hall Nosturi in Helsinki, Finland.

== Track listing ==
No.	Title	Length
1.	"Intro"	1:56
2.	"Hero in a Dream"	3:49
3.	"Guardians of Fate"	3:36
4.	"Tale of Revenge"	4:54
5.	"Dragonheads"	6:24
6.	"Windrider"	5:46
7.	"Warrior's Quest"	5:16
8.	"Lai Lai Hei"	7:22
9.	"Old Man (Väinämöinen)"	5:54
10.	"Slayer of Light"	3:15
11.	"Finnish Medley: Karjalan Kunnailla/Myrskyluodon Maija/Metsämiehen Laulu"	5:20
12.	"Tears"	3:22
13.	"Token of Time"	4:44
14.	"White Storm"	5:06
15.	"Into Hiding" (Amorphis cover)	4:35
16.	"Into Battle"	6:52
17.	"Kalevala Melody"	1:52
18.	"Iron"	4:03
19.	"Treacherous Gods"	5:51
20.	"Näitä Polkuja Tallaan"	4:03
21.	"Battle Song"	10:08

== Credits ==
Ensiferum

- Petri Lindroos − vocals, guitar
- Markus Toivonen − guitar, clean vocals
- Meiju Enho − keyboards
- Sami Hinkka − bass, clean vocals
- Janne Parviainen − drums

Additional musicians

- Kaisa Saari − vocals (11 and 12)
- Ville Tuomi − vocals (15)
- Kristian Ranta – introduces Ensiferum at start of the concert
