= Two Paths (album) =

Studio album by Ensiferum
- Released: 15 September 2017
- Recorded: March – May 2017
- Studios: Astia-Studio (Lappeenranta, Finland)
- Genres: Folk metal, melodic death metal, power metal
- Length: 53:30
- Label: Metal Blade
- Producer: Anssi Kippo

Ensiferum chronology
One Man Army (2015)	Two Paths (2017)	Thalassic (2020)

Singles from Two Paths
- 1. "For Those About to Fight for Metal" Released: 19 July 2017; 2. "Way of the Warrior" Released: 19 August 2017

Two Paths is the seventh studio album by Finnish folk metal band Ensiferum. It was released on 15 September 2017 through Metal Blade. It is the second and final Ensiferum album to feature accordionist Netta Skog, who replaced keyboardist Emmi Silvennoinen in 2016 and departed from the band in December 2017.

== Track listing ==
All lyrics are written by Sami Hinkka.

No.	Title	Music	Length
1.	"Ajattomasta unesta"	Markus Toivonen	2:12
2.	"For Those About to Fight for Metal"	Hinkka, Toivonen, Netta Skog	5:17
3.	"Way of the Warrior"	Toivonen	3:57
4.	"Two Paths"	Toivonen	4:48
5.	"King of Storms"	Hinkka, Toivonen	5:16
6.	"Feast with Valkyries"	Toivonen, Skog	4:08
7.	"Don't You Say"	Toivonen	3:39
8.	"I Will Never Kneel"	Hinkka	5:00
9.	"God Is Dead"	Hinkka	4:15
10.	"Hail to the Victor"	Toivonen	5:10
11.	"Unettomaan aikaan"	Toivonen, Skog, Hinkka	2:14
Total length:			45:56

Bonus tracks
No.	Title	Music	Length
12.	"God Is Dead (Alternative Version)"	Hinkka	3:55
13.	"Don't You Say (Alternative Version)"	Toivonen	3:39
Total length:			53:30

== Personnel ==
=== Band members ===
- Petri Lindroos – harsh vocals, guitars, percussion, choir
- Markus Toivonen – guitars, bouzouki, percussion, clean vocals, choir
- Sami Hinkka – bass, dulcimer, percussion, clean and harsh vocals, choir
- Janne Parviainen – drums
- Netta Skog – acoustic and digital accordion, female vocals, choir

=== Guest members ===
- Mikko P. Mustonen – orchestrations and orchestral arrangements
- Lassi Logrén – nyckelharpa, violin
- Vince Edwards – choir

=== Production ===
- Mikael "Routa" Karlbom – photography
- Gyula Havancsák – cover art
- Anssi Kippo – producer

== Charts ==
Chart (2017)	Peak position
Austrian Albums (Ö3 Austria)	35
Belgian Albums (Ultratop Flanders)	152
Belgian Albums (Ultratop Wallonia)	100
Finnish Albums (Suomen virallinen lista)	4
French Albums (SNEP)	128
German Albums (Offizielle Top 100)	9
Hungarian Albums (MAHASZ)	29
Swiss Albums (Schweizer Hitparade)	18
