= One Man Army (Ensiferum album) =

Studio album by Ensiferum
- Released: 20 February 2015
- Recorded: September – November 2014
- Studios: Astia-studio (Lappeenranta, Finland)
- Genres: Folk metal, melodic death metal, symphonic metal
- Length: 53:05
- Label: Metal Blade
- Producer: Anssi Kippo

Ensiferum chronology
Unsung Heroes (2012)	One Man Army (2015)	Two Paths (2017)

Singles from One Man Army
- 1. "One Man Army" Released: 12 January 2015

Professional ratings
Review scores
Source	Rating
About.com	4/5 stars
Metal Hammer	8/10 stars
MetalSucks	4/5 stars
Revolver	3/5 stars
Ultimate Guitar	7.3/10

One Man Army is the sixth studio album by Finnish folk metal band Ensiferum. It was released on 20 February 2015 through Metal Blade. It is the band's last album to feature keyboardist Emmi Silvennoinen.

== Track listing ==
No.	Title	Lyrics	Music	Length
1.	"March of War" (instrumental)		Markus Toivonen	1:32
2.	"Axe of Judgement"	Sami Hinkka	Toivonen & Ensiferum	4:33
3.	"Heathen Horde"	Hinkka, trad.	Toivonen & Ensiferum	4:12
4.	"One Man Army"	Hinkka	Toivonen & Ensiferum	4:25
5.	"Burden of the Fallen"	Hinkka	Toivonen	1:49
6.	"Warrior Without a War"	Hinkka	Toivonen & Ensiferum	5:24
7.	"Cry for the Earth Bounds"	Hinkka	Hinkka & Ensiferum	7:31
8.	"Two of Spades"	Hinkka	Toivonen & Ensiferum	3:39
9.	"My Ancestors' Blood" (Heathen Throne Part III)	Hinkka, trad.	Toivonen & Ensiferum	4:30
10.	"Descendants, Defiance, Domination" (Heathen Throne Part III)	Hinkka	Toivonen & Ensiferum	11:20
11.	"Neito Pohjolan"	Hinkka	Toivonen & Ensiferum	4:10
Total length:				53:05

Digipak/box set bonus CD
No.	Title	Lyrics	Music	Length
1.	"Rawhide" (cover)	Ned Washington	Dimitri Tiomkin	2:34
2.	"Warmetal" (Barathrum cover)	Demonos Sova	Demonos Sova	2:54
3.	"Candour and Lies"			4:10
4.	"Bonus Song"			4:29
Total length:				14:07

Box set bonus DVD
No.	Title	Length
1.	"One Man Army" (Official Video)	4:36
2.	"One Man Army" (Making Of)	3:40
3.	"Studio Report"
4.	"Slide Show"
5.	"Live at Rock Hard Festival 18.05.2013: In My Sword I Trust; Guardians of Fate; From Afar; Burning Leaves; One More Magic Potion; Retribution Shall Be Mine; Stone Cold Metal; Ahti; Twilight Tavern; Iron; Interview"

== Personnel ==
- Petri Lindroos – guitars, harsh vocals, backing vocals
- Markus Toivonen – guitars, clean vocals, backing vocals
- Sami Hinkka – bass, clean vocals, backing vocals
- Janne Parviainen – drums
- Emmi Silvennoinen – keyboards, hammond, grand piano, vocals

=== Additional musicians ===
- Netta Skog – clean vocals on #11, additional vocals, accordion
- Miitri Aaltonen – vocals on #14
- Jukka-Pekka Miettinen – additional vocals, choirs
- Frederik – additional vocals on #08
- Heri Joensen – speech on #03
- Matti Häkämies – speech on #09, 10
- Olli Haavisto – pedal steel guitar
- Lassi Logrén – nyckelharpa
- Timo Väänänen – kantele
- Manu Lohi – whistle duo on #08
- Mirko P. Mustonen – whistle duo on #08, choirs
- Tanja Varha – choirs
- Bianca Hösli – choirs
- Heidi Parviainen – choirs
- Tuomas Nieminen – choirs
- Petteri Lehikoinen – choirs
- Tapio Kuosma – choirs
- Jukka Hoffrén – choirs
- Toni Salminen – choirs
- Skid – choirs

== Trivia ==
"Neito Pohjolan" means "Lady Of The North"
