= Thalassic =

Studio album by Ensiferum
- Released: 10 July 2020
- Recorded: January – February 2020
- Studios: Petrax Studio (Hollola, Finland); Sonic Pump Studios (Helsinki, Finland); Fascination Street Studios (Örebro, Sweden)
- Genres: Folk metal, melodic death metal, power metal
- Length: 43:46
- Label: Metal Blade
- Producer: Janne Joutsenniemi

Ensiferum chronology
Two Paths (2017)	Thalassic (2020)	Winter Storm (2024)

Singles from Thalassic
- 1. "Rum, Women, Victory" Released: 7 May 2020; 2. "Andromeda" Released: 17 June 2020; 3. "For Sirens" Released: 15 July 2020; 4. "Run from the Crushing Tide" Released: 8 September 2020

Professional ratings
Review scores
Source	Rating
BangerTV	4/5 stars
Blabbermouth.net	8.5/10
Brave Words & Bloody Knuckles	8/10
Exclaim!	8/10
KNAC	4/5
Metal Hammer	3.5/5 stars

Thalassic is the eighth studio album by Finnish folk metal band Ensiferum. It was released on 10 July 2020 through Metal Blade Records. It is the first Ensiferum album to feature new keyboardist and clean vocalist Pekka Montin, who joined the band in February 2020.

The album's title "thalassic" (which is derived from both French and Ancient Greek) means "of or relating to seas", which pertains to the theme of the album's lyrics.

== Track listing ==
All lyrics are written by Sami Hinkka, except where noted.

No.	Title	Music	Length
1.	"Seafarer's Dream" (instrumental)	Hinkka; Mikko P. Mustonen	3:01
2.	"Rum, Women, Victory"	Markus Toivonen; Ensiferum	4:16
3.	"Andromeda"	Hinkka; Toivonen; Ensiferum	4:04
4.	"The Defence of the Sampo"	Toivonen; Ensiferum	4:50
5.	"Run from the Crushing Tide"	Toivonen; Ensiferum	4:22
6.	"For Sirens"	Hinkka; Toivonen; Ensiferum	4:40
7.	"One with the Sea"	Toivonen; Ensiferum	6:10
8.	"Midsummer Magic"	Hinkka; Ensiferum	3:42
9.	"Cold Northland (Väinämöinen Part III)"	Toivonen; Ensiferum	8:41
Total length:			43:46

Digipak bonus tracks
No.	Title	Lyrics	Music	Length
10.	"Merille lähtevä"	trad.	Hinkka; Toivonen; Ensiferum	3:47
11.	"I'll Stay by Your Side" (The Lollipops cover)	Lundgreen Torben; Lundgreen Jørgen	Torben; Jørgen	2:49
Total length:				50:22

Japanese bonus track
No.	Title	Music	Length
12.	"Rum, Women, Victory" (demo)	Toivonen; Ensiferum	4:13
Total length:			54:35

Box set bonus CD
No.	Title	Lyrics	Music	Original album	Length
1.	"Rum, Women, Victory" (demo)		Toivonen; Ensiferum	Thalassic	4:13
2.	"Andromeda" (demo)		Hinkka; Toivonen; Ensiferum	Thalassic	3:59
3.	"The Defence of the Sampo" (demo)		Toivonen; Ensiferum	Thalassic	3:53
4.	"Axe of Judgement" (demo)		Toivonen; Ensiferum	One Man Army	4:40
5.	"Heathen Horde" (demo)	Hinkka; trad.	Toivonen; Ensiferum	One Man Army	4:14
6.	"One Man Army" (demo)		Toivonen; Ensiferum	One Man Army	4:28
7.	"Warrior Without a War" (demo)		Toivonen; Ensiferum	One Man Army	4:53
8.	"Cry for the Earth Bounds" (demo)		Hinkka; Ensiferum	One Man Army	7:08
9.	"Two of Spades" (demo)		Toivonen; Ensiferum	One Man Army	3:33
10.	"My Ancestors' Blood" (demo)	Hinkka; trad.	Toivonen; Ensiferum	One Man Army	4:24
11.	"Descendants, Defiance, Domination" (demo)		Toivonen; Ensiferum	One Man Army	11:01
12.	"Candour and Lies" (demo)		Toivonen; Ensiferum	One Man Army	4:12
Total length:					60:38

== Personnel ==
=== Band members ===
- Petri Lindroos – guitars, harsh vocals
- Markus Toivonen – guitars, acoustic guitar, backing vocals
- Sami Hinkka – bass, vocals, acoustic guitar, bouzouki
- Janne Parviainen – drums, percussion
- Pekka Montin – clean vocals, keyboards (except tracks 4–12 on bonus CD)

=== Guest members ===
- Mikko P. Mustonen – orchestrations, whistles, guitars (additional acoustic), vocals (additional), programming
- Lassi Logrén – nyckelharpa, violin
- Janne Joutsenniemi – guitars (additional), vocals (backing)
- Emmi Silvennoinen – keyboards, hammond organ, grand piano, clean vocals (only tracks 4–12 on bonus CD)

=== Production ===
- Janne Joutsenniemi – production
- Jens Bogren – mixing, mastering
- Tero Kinnunen – additional recording
- Gyula Havancsák – artwork
- Vesa Ranta – photography

== Charts ==
Chart (2020)	Peak position
Hungarian Albums (MAHASZ)	28
