= Dragonheads (EP) =

EP by Ensiferum
- Released: 15 February 2006
- Recorded: November 2005
- Studio: Sonic Pump Studios
- Genres: Folk metal, melodic death metal
- Length: 25:55
- Label: Spinefarm

Ensiferum chronology
1997–1999 (2005)	Dragonheads (2006)	Victory Songs (2007)

Professional ratings
Review scores
Source	Rating
AllMusic	3/5 stars

Dragonheads is the debut EP by Finnish folk metal band Ensiferum. It was released on 15 February 2006 by Spinefarm Records. It is the first Ensiferum release featuring the then recently hired members Petri Lindroos, Sami Hinkka and Janne Parviainen. Mastered at Finnvox Studios. Warrior's Quest and White Storm are the re-recordings of songs from the band's second demo. Finnish Medley is a medley of the Finnish traditional pieces Karjalan kunnailla, Myrskyluodon Maija, and Metsämiehen laulu.

== Track listing ==
No.	Title	Length
1.	"Dragonheads"	5:21
2.	"Warrior's Quest"	4:53
3.	"Kalevala Melody"	1:47
4.	"White Storm"	4:56
5.	"Into Hiding" (Amorphis cover)	3:49
6.	"Finnish Medley"	5:09

== Personnel ==
- Petri Lindroos – guitars, harsh vocals
- Markus Toivonen – guitars, clean vocals, backing vocals, percussion
- Sami Hinkka – bass, clean vocals, backing vocals
- Meiju Enho – keyboards
- Janne Parviainen – drums

=== Additional musicians ===
- Kaisa Saari – female vocals (on track 6), recorder (on track 3)
- Vesa Vigman – mandolin (on track 3)
- Frostheim – kantele (on track 3)
