= Winter Storm (album) =

Studio album by Ensiferum
- Released: 18 October 2024
- Recorded: December 2023 – January 2024
- Studios: Petrax Studio (Hollola, Finland); Sonic Pump Studios (Helsinki, Finland); Fascination Street Studios (Örebro, Sweden)
- Genres: Folk metal, melodic death metal, power metal
- Length: 43:08
- Label: Metal Blade
- Producers: Janne Joutsenniemi; Ensiferum

Ensiferum chronology
Thalassic (2020)	Winter Storm (2024)

Singles from Winter Storm
- 1. "Winter Storm Vigilantes" Released: 18 June 2024; 2. "Long Cold Winter of Sorrow and Strife" Released: 12 September 2024; 3. "Fatherland" Released: 21 October 2024; 4. "The Howl" Released: 8 January 2025; 5. "Victorious" Released: 20 February 2025

Winter Storm is the ninth studio album by Finnish folk metal band Ensiferum. It was released on 18 October 2024 through Metal Blade Records.

== Track listing ==
All lyrics are written by Sami Hinkka, except where noted.

No.	Title	Music	Length
1.	"Aurora" (instrumental)	Markus Toivonen	1:14
2.	"Winter Storm Vigilantes"	Toivonen; Ensiferum	5:12
3.	"Long Cold Winter of Sorrow and Strife"	Toivonen; Ensiferum	6:59
4.	"Fatherland"	Hinkka; Ensiferum	4:51
5.	"Scars in My Heart"	Toivonen; Ensiferum	4:39
6.	"Resistentia"	Hinkka; Toivonen	1:18
7.	"The Howl"	Toivonen; Ensiferum	5:54
8.	"From Order to Chaos"	Toivonen; Ensiferum	8:42
9.	"Leniret Coram Tempestate" (instrumental)	Toivonen	0:37
10.	"Victorious"	Toivonen; Ensiferum	3:42
Total length:			43:08

Digipak bonus tracks
No.	Title	Lyrics	Music	Length
11.	"Six Ribbons" (Jon English and Mario Millo cover)	English	English	3:38
12.	"Lambada" (Kaoma cover)	Gonzalo Hermosa González; Ulises Hermosa González	G. González; U. González; Los Kjarkas	3:41
Total length:				50:27

== Personnel ==
=== Band members ===
- Petri Lindroos – vocals, guitars
- Pekka Montin – vocals, keyboards
- Sami Hinkka – bass, vocals, acoustic guitar
- Markus Toivonen – guitars, acoustic guitar, backing vocals, additional keyboards, orchestral arrangement, programming
- Janne Parviainen – drums

=== Guest members ===
- Madeleine Liljestam – vocals on "Scars in My Heart"
- Lassi Logrén – nyckelharpa, violin
- Mikko P. Mustonen – orchestrations, orchestral arrangements, programming

=== Production ===
- Janne Joutsenniemi – production
- Jens Bogren – mixing, mastering

=== Artwork ===
- Gyula Havancsák – cover art, booklet
- Svetlana Gonch – photos
