= Unsung Heroes (Ensiferum album) =

Studio album by Ensiferum
- Released: 27 August 2012
- Recorded: February 2012 – April 2012 at Petrax Studios in Hollola, Finland and Sound Supreme Recording Studio in Hämeenlinna, Finland
- Genres: Folk metal, melodic death metal, power metal
- Length: 61:19
- Languages: English, Finnish, German
- Label: Spinefarm
- Producer: Hiili Hiilesmaa

Ensiferum chronology
From Afar (2009)	Unsung Heroes (2012)	One Man Army (2015)

Singles from Unsung Heroes
- 1. "Burning Leaves" Released: 9 July 2012; 2. "In My Sword I Trust" Released: 20 August 2012

Unsung Heroes is the fifth studio album by Finnish folk metal band Ensiferum. It was released on 27 August 2012 through Spinefarm Records.

== Recording and production ==
In February 2012, the band entered the studio and started recordings for the then untitled album. The band also announced on their Facebook page they would keep their fans up to date on their Mobile Twilight Tavern and with a weekly studio diary on Spinefarm's YouTube channel. The album would also include guest appearances by members of Die Apokalyptischen Reiter and the Finnish singer and actor Vesa-Matti Loiri. In late March, the band was in the final stages of the recordings for the album and completed recordings in early April.

In May, the band revealed the title for the album, Unsung Heroes and announced its release date, 27 August 2012. The album would also be released through Spinefarm Records. Then in late June the band unveiled the album cover artwork, again designed by Kristian Wahlin. On 9 July they posted on their Facebook page a YouTube video with Burning Leaves, one of their new songs on the album.

On 17 July the band posted a link with the making of their new video clip for In My Sword I Trust, also a new song to be featured on the album. The video was shot in Wrocław, Poland by Grupa 13 who were also recruited for the recent video clips of other notable bands like Amon Amarth and Behemoth. The actual video was uploaded on 8 August on Spinefarm's YouTube channel, which reached over a hundred thousand views within the first week.

== Track listing ==
No.	Title	Lyrics	Music	Length
1.	"Symbols"	Instrumental	Petri Lindroos, Emmi Silvennoinen	1:51
2.	"In My Sword I Trust"	Sami Hinkka, Kalevala	Markus Toivonen	5:20
3.	"Unsung Heroes"	Hinkka	Toivonen	5:54
4.	"Burning Leaves"	Hinkka	Toivonen, Sami Hinkka, Lindroos	6:03
5.	"Celestial Bond"	Hinkka	Toivonen	4:15
6.	"Retribution Shall Be Mine"	Hinkka	Toivonen	4:27
7.	"Star Queen (Celestial Bond Part II)"	Hinkka	Toivonen, Hinkka	5:55
8.	"Pohjola"	Hinkka, Markus Toivonen, Yrjö Koskinen	Toivonen, Hinkka	6:05
9.	"Last Breath"	Hinkka	Hinkka	4:29
10.	"Passion, Proof, Power"	Hinkka	Toivonen, Hinkka	17:00
Total length:				61:19

Limited edition bonus track
No.	Title	Lyrics	Length
11.	"Bamboleo" (Gipsy Kings cover)	Tonino Baliardo, Chico Bouchikhi, Simón Díaz, Nicolas Reyes	3:45

Japanese edition bonus tracks
No.	Title	Lyrics	Music	Length
11.	"Wrathchild" (Iron Maiden cover)	Steve Harris	Steve Harris	3:15
12.	"Bamboléo" (Gipsy Kings cover)	Tonino Baliardo, Chico Bouchikhi, Simón Díaz, Nicolas Reyes		3:45

Limited edition bonus DVD
No.	Title	Length
1.	"Documentary: Symbols to Passion: The Making of Unsung Heroes"	1:54:00
2.	"Studio Diary: Week 1"	4:11
3.	"Studio Diary: Week 2"	9:01
4.	"Studio Diary: Week 3"	9:09
5.	"Studio Diary: Week 4"	7:23
6.	"Studio Diary: Week 5"	7:29
7.	"Studio Diary: Week 6"	10:16
8.	"Studio Diary: Week 7"	21:31
Total length:		182:20

== Personnel ==
Ensiferum

- Petri Lindroos - guitars, harsh vocals, backing vocals
- Markus Toivonen - guitars, acoustic guitar, dulcimer, bouzouki, clean vocals, backing vocals
- Sami Hinkka - bass, acoustic guitar, backing vocals (harsh/clean)
- Janne Parviainen - drums, backing vocals
- Emmi Silvennoinen - keyboards, hammond, grand piano, pump organ, backing vocals

Guest musicians

- Vesa-Matti Loiri - speech on "Pohjola"
- Laura Dziadulewicz - vocals on "Celestial Bond"
- Ulla Bürger - soprano vocals on "Passion, Proof, Power"
- Lassi Lógren - nyckelharpa
- Timo Väänänen - kantele
- Pasi Puolakka - flute, descant & sopranino Recorders
- Kasper Mårtenson - moog
- Volk-Man, Ady & Fuchs (Die Apokalyptischen Reiter) - additional voices on "Passion, Proof, Power"
- Heidi Parviainen (Dark Sarah, ex-Amberian Dawn) - choir vocals

Crew

- Kristian Wåhlin - album artwork
- Hiili Hiilesmaa - production, engineering and mixing
