= Vandraren =

Single by Nordman

from the album Nordman
- A-side: "Vandraren"
- B-side: "Strömkarlen"
- Released: 1994
- Genre: Ethnopop
- Label: Sonet
- Songwriters: Py Bäckman; Mats Wester

Nordman singles chronology
"Förlist" (1994)	"Vandraren" (1994)	"Laglöst land" (1994)

Music video
- "Vandraren" on YouTube

"Vandraren" (The Wanderer) is a song with music composed by Mats Wester and lyrics written by Py Bäckman. The song was recorded by Swedish duo Nordman as the opening track of their self-titled debut studio album, Nordman (1994). Becoming a major hit in Sweden, it was given the Rockbjörnen award in the "Swedish song of the year 1994" category.

The single peaked at number seven on the Swedish singles chart. Also charting at Svensktoppen, it stayed for 18 weeks on the chart between 16 July-12 November 1994, peaking at number 3.

== Other versions ==
In 2009, the song was recorded by Ensiferum (sung by Heri Joensen of Týr (band) ) for the album From Afar, and Ritchie Blackmore's band Blackmore's Night has recorded it as Journeyman on 2010 album Autumn Sky. In 2014, Plumbo together with Ole Evenrud, recorded the song in Norwegian as "Vandreren" for the album, Kom Som Dæ Sjæl and released the song as a single.

== Charts ==
Chart (1994)	Peak position
Iceland (Íslenski Listinn Topp 40)	39
Sweden (Sverigetopplistan)	7
Sweden (Svensktoppen)	3
