= Iron (Ensiferum album) =

Studio album by Ensiferum
- Released: 17 May 2004
- Recorded: July–December 2003 at Sweet Silence Studios in Copenhagen, Denmark
- Genres: Folk metal, melodic death metal, power metal
- Length: 43:31
- Label: Spinefarm
- Producer: Flemming Rasmussen

Ensiferum chronology
Ensiferum (2001)	Iron (2004)	Victory Songs (2007)

Professional ratings
Review scores
Source	Rating
AllMusic	4/5 stars

Iron is the second studio album by Finnish folk metal band Ensiferum. Released in 2004, it is the band's first album to feature keyboardist Meiju Enho and the last to feature vocalist and guitarist Jari Mäenpää before he formed Wintersun in the same year. It is also their final album to feature bassist Jukka-Pekka Miettinen and drummer Oliver Fokin.

== Track listing ==
No.	Title	Lyrics	Music	Length
1.	"Ferrum Aeternum"		Markus Toivonen	3:30
2.	"Iron"	J. Mäenpää	M. Toivonen, J. Mäenpää	3:55
3.	"Sword Chant"	J. Mäenpää	J. Mäenpää	4:46
4.	"Mourning Heart - Interlude"		M. Toivonen	1:25
5.	"Tale of Revenge"	J. Mäenpää	M. Toivonen	4:32
6.	"Lost in Despair"	J. Mäenpää	M. Toivonen	5:39
7.	"Slayer of Light"	J. Mäenpää	J. Mäenpää, M. Toivonen	3:12
8.	"Into Battle"	J. Mäenpää	M. Toivonen, J. Mäenpää	5:54
9.	"Lai Lai Hei"	J. Mäenpää	J. Mäenpää	7:17
10.	"Tears"	J. Mäenpää, K. Saari	M. Toivonen	3:21
Total length:				43:31

Bonus track
No.	Title	Lyrics	Music	Length
11.	"Battery" (Metallica cover)	J. Hetfield	J. Hetfield, L. Ulrich	5:13
Total length:				48:44

== Credits ==
=== Band members ===
- Jari Mäenpää − guitars, lead vocals
- Markus Toivonen − guitars, backing vocals, shaman drum
- Meiju Enho − keyboards
- Jukka-Pekka Miettinen − bass
- Oliver Fokin − drums, percussion, bombo, tinja, tambourine

=== Session musicians ===
- Vesa Vigman − bouzouki, mandolin, saz, dulcimer, saxophone
- Eveliina Kontio − kantele
- Kaisa Saari − female vocals on "Ferrum Aeternum" and "Tears", tenor and soprano, recorders and tin whistles
