= Ensiferum (album) =

Studio album by Ensiferum
- Released: 9 July 2001
- Recorded: November 2000 at Sundi-Coop Studios
- Genres: Folk metal, melodic death metal, power metal
- Length: 55:00
- Label: Spinefarm

Ensiferum chronology
| Ensiferum (2001) | Iron (2004) |

Professional ratings
Review scores
| Source | Rating |
|---|---|
| AllMusic | 4/5 stars |
| The Metal Crypt | 4/5 stars |
| Metal Storm | 9/10 stars |
| Sputnikmusic | 4/5 stars |

Ensiferum is the debut studio album by Finnish folk metal band Ensiferum. It was released on 9 July 2001 on Spinefarm Records.

== Track listing ==
All lyrics are written by Jari Mäenpää, except "Goblins' Dance" by Valtias Mustatuuli.

| No. | Title | Music | Length |
|---|---|---|---|
| 1. | "Intro" | Markus Toivonen; Mäenpää | 1:50 |
| 2. | "Hero in a Dream" | Toivonen; Mäenpää | 3:40 |
| 3. | "Token of Time" | Mäenpää | 4:16 |
| 4. | "Guardians of Fate" | Toivonen; Mäenpää | 3:34 |
| 5. | "Old Man (Väinämöinen Part I)" | Toivonen | 5:33 |
| 6. | "Little Dreamer (Väinämöinen Part II)" | Toivonen; Oliver Fokin | 5:21 |
| 7. | "Abandoned" | Toivonen | 6:50 |
| 8. | "Windrider" | Toivonen | 5:41 |
| 9. | "Treacherous Gods" | Toivonen | 5:12 |
| 10. | "Eternal Wait" | Toivonen | 5:14 |
| 11. | "Battle Song" | Toivonen | 3:20 |
| Total length: | | | 50:31 |

Bonus track
| No. | Title | Music | Length |
|---|---|---|---|
| 12. | "Goblins' Dance" | Toivonen | 4:29 |
| Total length: | | | 55:00 |

== Personnel ==
=== Band members ===
- Jari Mäenpää − guitars, vocals
- Markus Toivonen − guitars
- Jukka-Pekka Miettinen − bass
- Oliver Fokin − drums, percussion

=== Guests ===
- Henri Sorvali (a.k.a. Trollhorn) − keyboards
- Marita Toivonen − kantele
- Johanna Vakkuri − vocals
- Teemu Saari − vocals
- Antti Mikkonen − vocals
