= Vår julskinka har rymt =

1988 single by Werner & Werner

Single by Werner & Werner

from the album Kockarnas skiva
- Language: Swedish
- Released: 1988
- Genre: Synth-pop; Christmas
- Length: 4:36
- Label: Little Big Apple
- Songwriters: Joakim Bergman; Billy Butt
- Producers: Mats Wester; Billy Butt

Audio
- "Vår julskinka har rymt" on YouTube

"Vår julskinka har rymt" ('Our Christmas ham has escaped') is a song recorded by Swedish duo Werner & Werner for their debut studio album, Kockarnas skiva (1988).

The song became a Svensktoppen hit for three weeks, staying at the chart between 11 December 1988-8 January 1989, with fifth, third and another fifth place as result. The song is credited Billy Butt.

== Track listing and formats ==
- Swedish 7-inch single

A. "Vår julskinka har rymt" – 4:36
B. "Vår julskinka har rymt (Version 2: Sjung själv får du se hur lätt det är)" – 4:36

- Swedish 12-inch single

A. "Vår julskinka har rymt (Remix)" – 6:27
B1. "Vår julskinka har rymt" – 4:36
B2. "Vår julskinka har rymt (Version 2: Sjung själv får du se hur lätt det är)" – 4:36

== Credits and personnel ==
- Sven Melander – vocals
- Åke Cato – songwriter, vocals
- Joakim Bergman – songwriter
- Billy Butt – songwriter, producer
- Mats Wester – producer, arranger
- Jaan Orvet – cover art, photographer

Credits and personnel adapted from the Kockarnas skiva album and 7-inch single liner notes.

== Charts ==
=== Weekly charts ===
Weekly chart performance for "Vår julskinka har rymt"
Chart (1988–2021)	Peak position
Sweden (Sverigetopplistan)	5
