= Victory Songs =

Studio album by Ensiferum
- Released: 23 March 2007
- Recorded: November–December 2006 at Sonic Pump Studios
- Genres: Folk metal, melodic death metal, power metal
- Length: 50:00
- Label: Spinefarm
- Producer: Janne Joutsenniemi

Ensiferum chronology
Iron (2004)	Victory Songs (2007)	From Afar (2009)

Professional ratings
Review scores
Source	Rating
AllMusic	4/5 stars
Metal Hammer	8/10 stars
Metal Storm	9.5/10 stars
Sputnikmusic	4/5 stars

Victory Songs is the third studio album by Finnish folk metal band Ensiferum. It was released through Spinefarm on 23 March 2007 domestically, and on 20 April 2007 in the rest of the world. It is the band's first full-length album to feature new members Petri Lindroos, Sami Hinkka and Janne Parviainen, and the last to feature Meiju Enho.

== Track listing ==
No.	Title	Lyrics	Music	Length
1.	"Ad Victoriam"		Meiju Enho, Sami Hinkka, Markus Toivonen	3:10
2.	"Blood Is the Price of Glory"	Hinkka	Toivonen, J.P. Miettinen	5:17
3.	"Deathbringer from the Sky"	Hinkka	Hinkka, Toivonen	5:10
4.	"Ahti"	Hinkka	Toivonen	3:55
5.	"One More Magic Potion"	Hinkka	Toivonen	5:21
6.	"Wanderer"	Hinkka	Toivonen	6:32
7.	"Raised by the Sword"	Enho	Enho, Toivonen	6:11
8.	"The New Dawn"	Petri Lindroos	Lindroos, Toivonen	3:42
9.	"Victory Song"	Hinkka	Toivonen, Hinkka, Miettinen	10:42
Total length:				50:00

Limited edition bonus track
No.	Title	Lyrics	Music	Length
10.	"Lady in Black" (Uriah Heep cover. The actual song length is 5 minutes; afterwards, there is a few minutes of silence followed by acapella parts of the songs, "Wanderer" and "Victory Song".)	Ken Hensley	K. Hensley	10:00
Total length:				60:00

Limited edition bonus DVD
No.	Title	Length
0.	"Ensiferum photoshoot featurette & The Iron tour featurette"

== Personnel ==
=== Band members ===
- Petri Lindroos – guitars, harsh vocals, banjo
- Markus Toivonen – guitars, clean vocals, acoustic & 12-string guitars, banjo, shaman drum, backing vocals
- Sami Hinkka – bass, clean vocals, harsh vocals on "Ahti"
- Meiju Enho – keyboards
- Janne Parviainen – drums, bodhran

=== Session/guest musicians ===
- Johanna Vakkuri – flute
- Euge Valovirta – acoustic guitars
- Petri Prauda – bagpipes
- Vesa Vigman – mandolin, bouzouki, saz
- Kaisa Saari – tin whistle, recorder
- Aleksi Parviainen – additional lead vocals (on "Deathbringer from the Sky"), backing vocals
- Lassi Logren – nyckelharpa
- Timo Väänänen – kantele
- D.P. – backing harsh vocals
