= Barathrum =

Finnish doom metal band

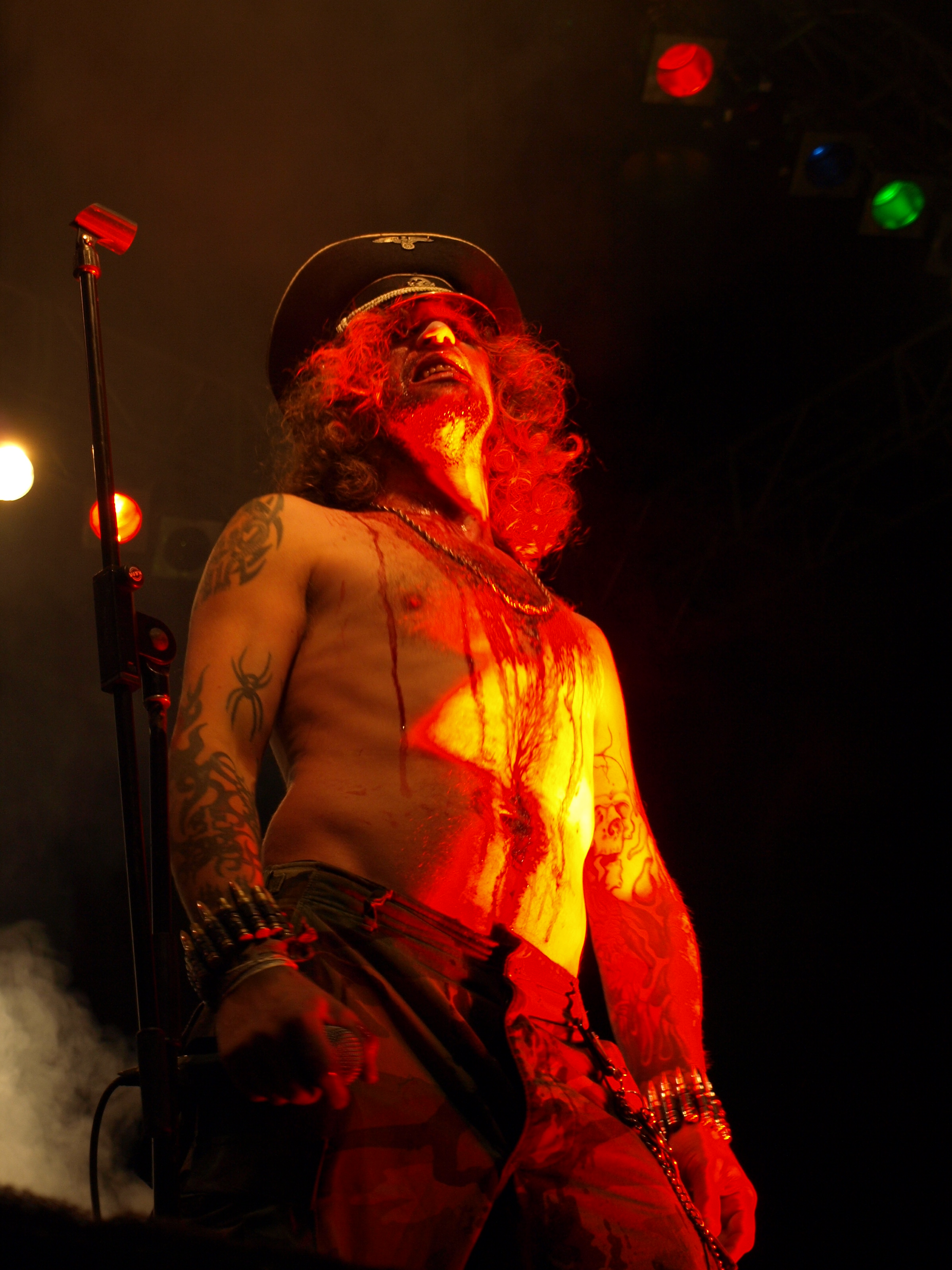
- Demonos Sova at Jalometalli 2008 in Oulu

Background information
- Origin: Kuopio, Finland
- Genre: Black-doom
- Years active: 1990–present
- Labels: Spinefarm Records, Saturnal Records, Nazgul's Eyrie Productions
- Members: Demonos Sova; Anathemalignant; Pelceboop; Nuklear Tormentörr; Ruttokieli; Pete Vendetta
- Past members: Aki Hytönen; Ilu; Jetblack Roima; Niko; Neva; Bloodbeast; Necronom Dethstrike; Infernus; Reaper Sklethnor; Destrukkktorr; Crowl; Pimeä; Sulphur; Nattasett; Warlord; Somnium; Beast Dominator; Trollhorn; Anathemalignant

Barathrum is a Finnish black-doom metal band formed in 1990. The band's name is Latin for pit or abyss. The first letters of their eight full-length albums spell "HEIL SOVA" - referring to the band's frontman, Demonos Sova, the only original member of the band. Their music is similar to Venom and Celtic Frost. Their lyrics deal with occult and religious themes.

== History ==
Barathrum was founded at Kuopio, Finland as Darkfeast, which was changed into Barathrum the year after.

Barathrum recorded several demos during the years 1991-1993. After the demos, Barathrum signed to Nazgul’s Eyrie Productions, which released the albums Hailstorm (1995), Eerie (1995) and Infernal (1997) before the label went on hiatus and left Barathrum unsigned.

The band signed to Spinefarm Records in 1998 and released five albums, Legions Of Perkele (1998), Saatana (1999), Okkult (2000), Venomous (2002), and Anno Aspera: 2003 Years After Bastard’s Birth, making Barathrum a prominent Finnish black metal band.

After a hiatus, the band signed to Saturnal Records and released their ninth full-length album, Fanatiko, in April 28th 2017.

== Current line-up ==
- Demonos Sova – All instruments, vocals
- Anathemalignant – Guitar
- Pelceboop - Guitar
- Nuklear Tormentörr – Bass
- Ruttokieli - Bass
- Pete Vendetta - Drums

=== Previous members ===
- Aki Hytönen – guitars (1990–1992) (also in Demilich)
- Ilu – drums (1990–1992)
- Jetblack Roima (1990-1991, 2012-2016)
- Niko – guitars (1992–1992)
- Neva – guitars (1992–1992)
- Bloodbeast – guitars (1992)
- Necronom Dethstrike – drums (1992–1992)
- Infernus – bass (1992–1996)
- Reaper Sklethnor – guitars (1993–1994)
- Destrukktorr – drums (1993–1994)
- Crowl – bass (1994–1994)
- Pimeä – drums (1995–1996)
- Sulphur – guitars (1996)
- Nattasett – drums (1998) (also in Darkwoods My Betrothed)
- Warlord – guitars (1999)
- Somnium – guitars (1999–2001) (also in Finntroll, Impaled Nazarene and Thy Serpent)
- Beast Dominator – drums (1999) (also in Finntroll, Rapture and Shape of Despair)
- Trollhorn – keyboards (2000–2001) (also in Ensiferum, Finntroll and Moonsorrow)
- Anathemalignant – guitars (1997–1998, 2000–2004, 2007–2012)
- Pelceboop - guitars (2000-2007)
- Abyssir – drums (2000–2007) (also in Ensiferum, Sinergy, ex-Waltari)
- G'Thaur – Bass, Vocals (1996–2012) (also in Arthemesia and ex-Korpiklaani)
- Agathon – Drums (2007–2010) (also in Soulgrind, ex-Thy Serpent, Walhalla, Gloomy Grim)
- Avenger – Drums (ex-Goatmoon, ex-Dauntless) (2011–2012)

== Discography ==
=== Studio albums ===
- Hailstorm (1994)
- Eerie (1995)
- Infernal (1997)
- Legions of Perkele (1998)
- Saatana (1999)
- Okkult (2000)
- Venomous (2002)
- Anno Aspera – 2003 Years After Bastard's Birth (2005)
- Fanatiko (2017)
- Überkill (2024)

=== Live albums ===
- Long Live Satan (2009)

=== EPs and singles ===
- Devilry (EP, 1997)
- Jetblack (1997, 7"EP, limited to 666 copies)
- Black Flames and Blood (CDS, 2002)
- Hellspawn (Single, 2017)

=== Demos ===
- From Black Flames to Witchcraft (1991)
- Witchmaster (1991)
- Battlecry (1992)
- Sanctissime Colere Satanas (1993)
- Sanctus Satanas (Studio & Stage) (1993)
- Soaring Up from Hell (1993)
