= Riddare av Koden =

South African band

Riddare Av Koden
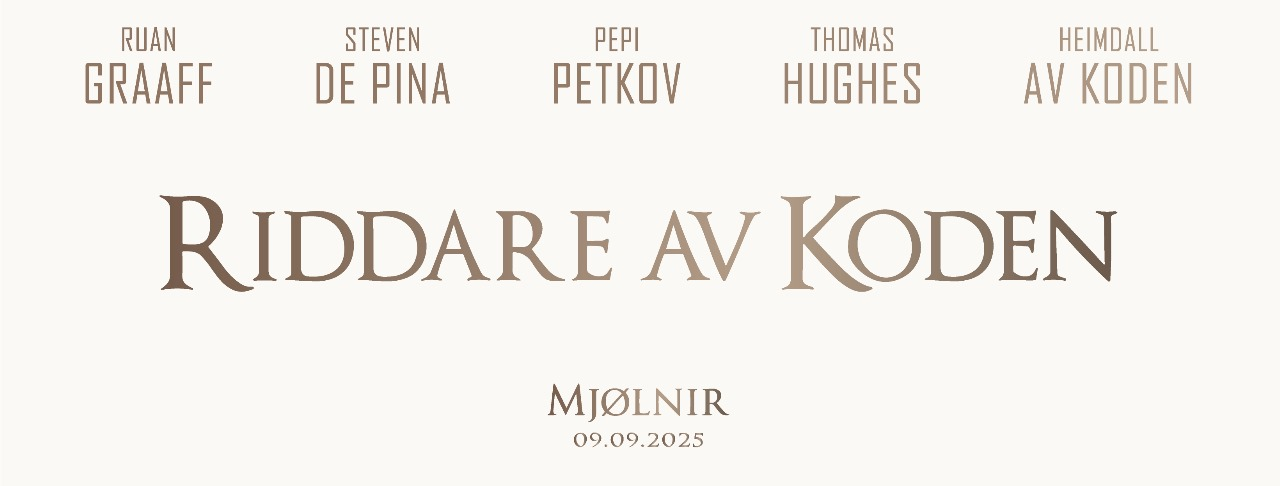
- Riddare Av Koden 2025 Lineup

Background information
- Origin: Secunda, South Africa
- Genres: Melodic Death Metal
- Years active: 2006–present
- Labels: Independent
- Members: Heimdall av Koden; Pepi Petkov; Ruan Graaff; Steven De Pina; Thomas Hughes
- Past members: Daniel Wilson; Nathan Wilson; Kevin Webber
- Website: www.rakofficial.com

Riddare av Koden (Swedish for 'Knights of the Code') is a Heavy Metal band from South Africa. Formerly known as Elegy, the band had to change its name in November 2009, when the underground success of their debut album attracted the attention of Universal Records. They then became known as Riddare av Koden, and currently perform and release under that name.

== Musical characteristics ==
Riddare av Koden is influenced by a range of bands and artists over many different genres. Their music has often been described as hard-hitting, guitar-driven Melodic Death Metal, heavily incorporating full-bodied classical elements reminiscent of powerful film scores.

== Band history ==
=== Elegy era (October 2006 – November 2009) ===
Elegy was formed in October 2006, by brothers Nathan and Daniel Wilson, who were 17 and 23 at the time. The two brothers asked Shay Kallie to assume lead guitar duties, having been childhood friends and sharing a passion in Heavy Metal. The trio then began writing songs and looking for a vocalist and bassist. Travis Seager then joined the band as vocalist. Kevin Webber was asked to join the band temporarily to complete the line-up for their first show in Secunda, Mpumalanga.

Kevin Webber became a permanent member in the band, and strong friendships began forming between the members of Elegy. After their first show, the band began working on an LP to gain entry into the South African Metal scene. During this period, Travis Seager left to pursue his career as an artist. Shay then assumed lead vocal duties and Elegy went into studio to record their debut LP - "A Voice Will Call", which landed them a distribution deal with Electromode Records - South Africa's biggest distribution label.

In November 2009 the label received a letter from Universal Records, stating that they were illegally using the Elegy name, which is registered to the Dutch Power Metal band of the same name.

=== Riddare av Koden era (November 2009 – present) ===
Elegy began searching for new names, opening up the debate to fans worldwide.

Within a week of receiving the change notice they announced that their new name was to be "Riddare av Koden".

The name change caused much controversy between fans and the public, and was announced officially on 16 November 2009.

In May 2010, Riddare av Koden began working with Multi-instrumentalist and Composer Steven de Pina and, in September 2010 he was officially welcomed into the band as Keyboardist and Folk instrumentalist.

Riddare av Koden was named the official support act for the Ensiferum South African tour of October 2010.

In April 2011, Daniel Wilson (one of the two founding members) announced his departure from the band.

Riddare av Koden took a break from constant live performance in 2011 and only played exclusive shows and festivals throughout the year with Cameron Zuccarelli on drums and their very first International Tour dates.

They released "A Voice Will Call" for free download worldwide, and their fanbase continued to grow internationally.

2012 didn't see performance activity from the band as the members of Riddare av Koden were on a Sabbatical/Hiatus. Later that year, Nathan Wilson and Kevin Webber also announced their departure.

==== Heimdall av Koden ====
Shay Kallie began composing new music and looking for musicians to test the suites in a live environment.

He adopted the stage name "Heimdall av Koden".

Thomas Hughes was asked to play drums for Riddare. Thomas had come from a technical death metal background, as well as being the drummer for Ska Punk Legends - Fuzigish.

Thomas then suggested that they ask Pepi Petkov to assume second guitar/vocal duties. Pepi had come from Autumn Sun, a Melodic Death Metal band, having toured with the likes of Kreator, Cradle of Filth and other big names.

==== Dynasty (EP) ====
On 23 May 2013, Riddare av Koden debuted "Mjolnir", "The Æsir", and "The Battle Ov Bifrost Bridge", live in Johannesburg, South Africa with William Bishop on bass.

==== Dynasty (LP) ====
During this time, the concept & artwork for "Dynasty" was created by Jason Enslin & Heimdall av Koden.

== Members ==
Current members

- Heimdall av Koden – guitar, vocals (2006–present)
- Pepi Petkov – guitar, vocals (2013–present)
- Ruan Graaff – guitar, (2013–present)
- Steven de Pina – keyboards, Woodwinds, Cello, Banjo (2010–present)

Former members

- Nathan Wilson – guitar, backing vocals (2006–2012) Founding member
- Kevin Webber – bass, backing vocals (2006–2012)
- Daniel Wilson – drums (2006–2011) Founding Member
- William Bishop – bass, backing vocals (2013)
- Thomas Hughes – drums (2013)

== Discography ==
=== Albums ===
- A Voice Will Call (2009) Rock Finder Magazine ReviewRateyourmusic.com Review

=== EPs ===
- Elegy (2007)
