= Ensiferum =

Finnish folk metal band

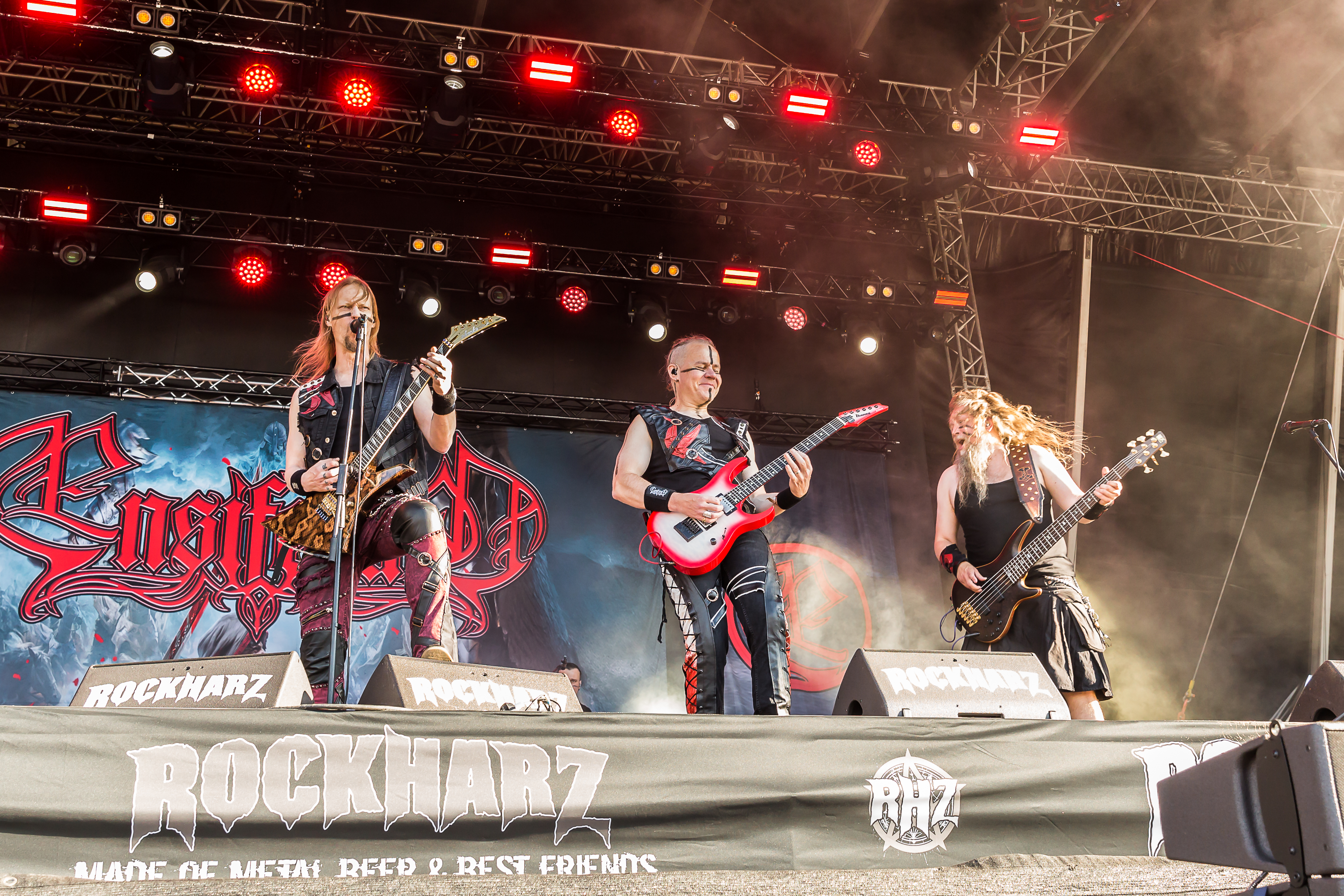
- Ensiferum at Rockharz 2026

Background information
- Origin: Helsinki, Finland
- Genres: Folk metal; Viking metal; power metal; melodic death metal
- Years active: 1995–present
- Labels: Spinefarm; Metal Blade
- Members: Markus Toivonen; Petri Lindroos; Sami Hinkka; Janne Parviainen; Pekka Montin
- Past members: Sauli Savolainen; Kimmo Miettinen; Jari Mäenpää; Oliver Fokin; Jukka-Pekka Miettinen; Meiju Enho; Emmi Silvennoinen; Netta Skog
- Website: ensiferum.com

Ensiferum (Latin: ensiferum, n adj., meaning "sword bearing") is a Finnish folk metal band from Helsinki. The members of the band label themselves "melodic folk metal". The group has released nine studio albums.

== History ==
=== Formation, demos and Ensiferum (1995−2002) ===
The highly stylized logo of Ensiferum has appeared on all of their releases.

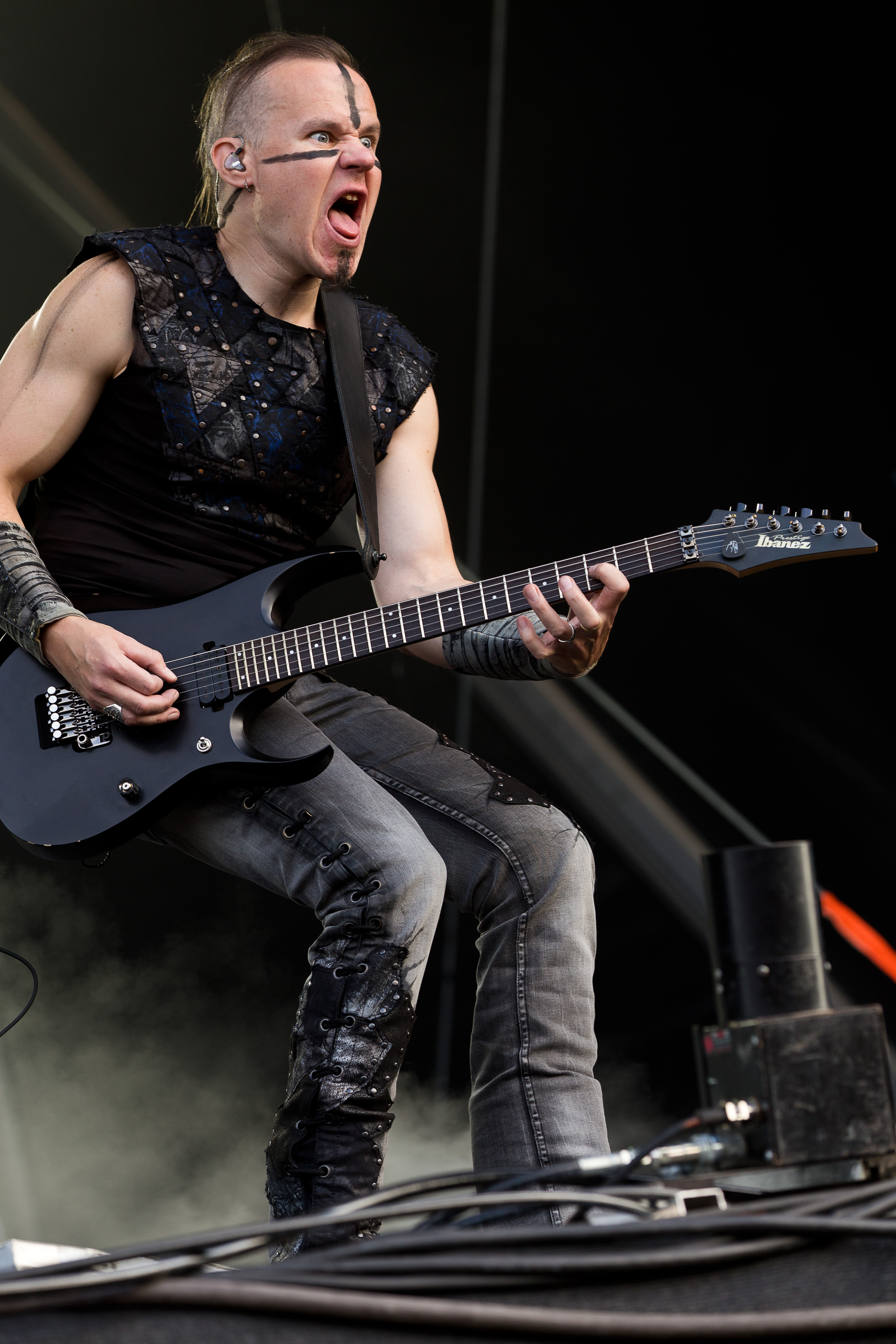
Guitarist Markus Toivonen is the band's sole constant member.

Markus Toivonen (guitar), Sauli Savolainen (bass), and Kimmo Miettinen (drums) founded Ensiferum in 1995. The following year, Jari Mäenpää joined the band as singer and second guitar-player. In 1997, they released their first, three-song demo.

In 1998, Savolainen and Miettinen left the band and were replaced with Kimmo Miettinen's 14-year-old brother, Jukka-Pekka Miettinen, and Oliver Fokin. In January 1999, they recorded a second demo that did not produce a record deal but boosted the band's confidence. In November 1999, they recorded a third demo, Hero in a Dream, which earned them a deal with Spinefarm Records. Tuomas Tahvanainen designed the band logo for the third demo by. He also designed the logos for the earlier demos. In 2000, the band went into the studio to work on their first album, Ensiferum, released in July 2001. In the same year, keyboardist Meiju Enho joined them.

=== Iron, line-up changes, Dragonheads and 10th Anniversary Live (2003−2006) ===
In early 2004, after completing work on the second album, Iron, Mäenpää was fired due to conflicts between scheduled studio work on his side project Wintersun and touring with Ensiferum. For the tour with Finntroll starting in April, Petri Lindroos from Norther replaced Mäenpää on guitar and vocals, and became an official member after the tour. In December 2004, Jukka-Pekka Miettinen left the band and Sami Hinkka (Rapture) replaced him. Fokin left in 2005, replaced with Janne Parviainen.

The new line-up entered the studio later that year to record the EP Dragonheads, released in February 2006. In addition to the title track, it contained two reworked demo songs: an Amorphis cover and a short rendition of the Kalevala melody, as well as a medley of three traditional Finnish songs.

In June 2006, Ensiferum released the live DVD 10th Anniversary Live, recorded in Nosturi, Helsinki, on 31 December 2005.

=== Victory Songs and Meiju's departure (2006−2009) ===
The third studio album, Victory Songs, was recorded between November 2006 and early 2007, and released on 20 April 2007. The single "One More Magic Potion" (after the track of the same name) was released on 7 February. Following the album's release, the band released through the producer's MySpace page, a music video for the song "Ahti", which included the band members as extras. The video was released after the album release due to video filming problems.

On 10 September 2007, it was announced that keyboardist Meiju Enho would leave the band. This was posted in a bulletin on their MySpace page and later confirmed on their website. The band used Emmi Silvennoinen of Exsecratus as a touring fill-in. Silvennoinen later became a permanent member during the recording of the From Afar album.

Ensiferum headlined the Paganfest tour in Europe and North America in 2008. Others playing the tour included Týr and Eluveitie, with Moonsorrow and Korpiklaani joining them on the European part of the tour, and Turisas in North America. They supported Megadeth on the opening night of their United Abominations – Tour of Duty European tour. Ensiferum supported Amon Amarth on their North American Twilight of the Thunder God tour.

Shortly before their Russian tour in 2008, Lindroos fell "seriously ill" and was unable to participate. The band hired ex-bassist Jukka-Pekka Miettinen to play guitar, while bassist Sami Hinkka took over lead vocals for the tour.

In the first half of 2009, Ensiferum performed at festivals including Frostrock in Belgium, Finnish Metal Expo and Tuska Open Air in Finland, Winterfire, Rocktower, Legacy and Rock am Härtsfeldsee in Germany, Summer Nights in Austria, and Z7 Metal Dayz in Switzerland. In June and July, they toured North America as part of the Summer Slaughter Tour with Necrophagist, Darkest Hour, Suffocation, Blackguard, Dying Fetus, Beneath the Massacre, Origin, and Winds of Plague. In August, they performed at the Global East Rock Festival in Ukraine, Ankkarock and Jurassic Rock in Finland, and Let's Open Air in Turkey.

=== From Afar and Unsung Heroes (2009−2012) ===
Ensiferum released their fourth studio album, From Afar, on 9 September 2009 with Spinefarm Records. The album was produced by Nightwish producer Tero Kinnunen and Victory Songs producer Janne Joutsenniemi, and it was mixed by producer Hiili Hiilesmaa. The limited edition of the album includes a cover of Swedish folk rock group Nordman with guest vocalist Heri Joensen of Faroese band Týr. Following the release, the group embarked on a European tour with Estonian folk metal band Metsatöll and Finnish melodic death metal band Tracedawn. In October, they performed at Hellflame Festival – The South Side of Hell and Devil's Revenge festival in Germany, and Tattoo the Mind in France. Ensiferum performed on the second day of the inaugural Screamfest Festival in Sydney, Australia, on New Years Day 2010. In November/December, they toured North America with Ex Deo (on selected dates) and Blackguard.

Ensiferum were confirmed to play Bloodstock Open Air at Catton Hall, UK in 2010. In October 2010, Ensiferum embarked on their first South African tour. This tour consisted of four shows in two cities. They were accompanied by numerous local metal bands, including Riddare av Koden, Empery and All Forlorn. The final show, at The Black Dahlia in Johannesburg, was filmed to potentially appear on their next live DVD. In early 2011, Ensiferum embarked on The Ugly World Tour 2011 with labelmates Children of Bodom, Amon Amarth, Machinae Supremacy supporting them for segments of their tour in the US and Canada. The tour took place within a four-month period of time and spanned 23 countries.

The band's fifth studio album, Unsung Heroes, was released on 24 August 2012, their final album for Spinefarm Records after thirteen years. The next year, Ensiferum signed with Metal Blade Records. After the release, Ensiferum embarked on a tour of Europe and South America.

=== New label, One Man Army and Two Paths (2013−2019) ===
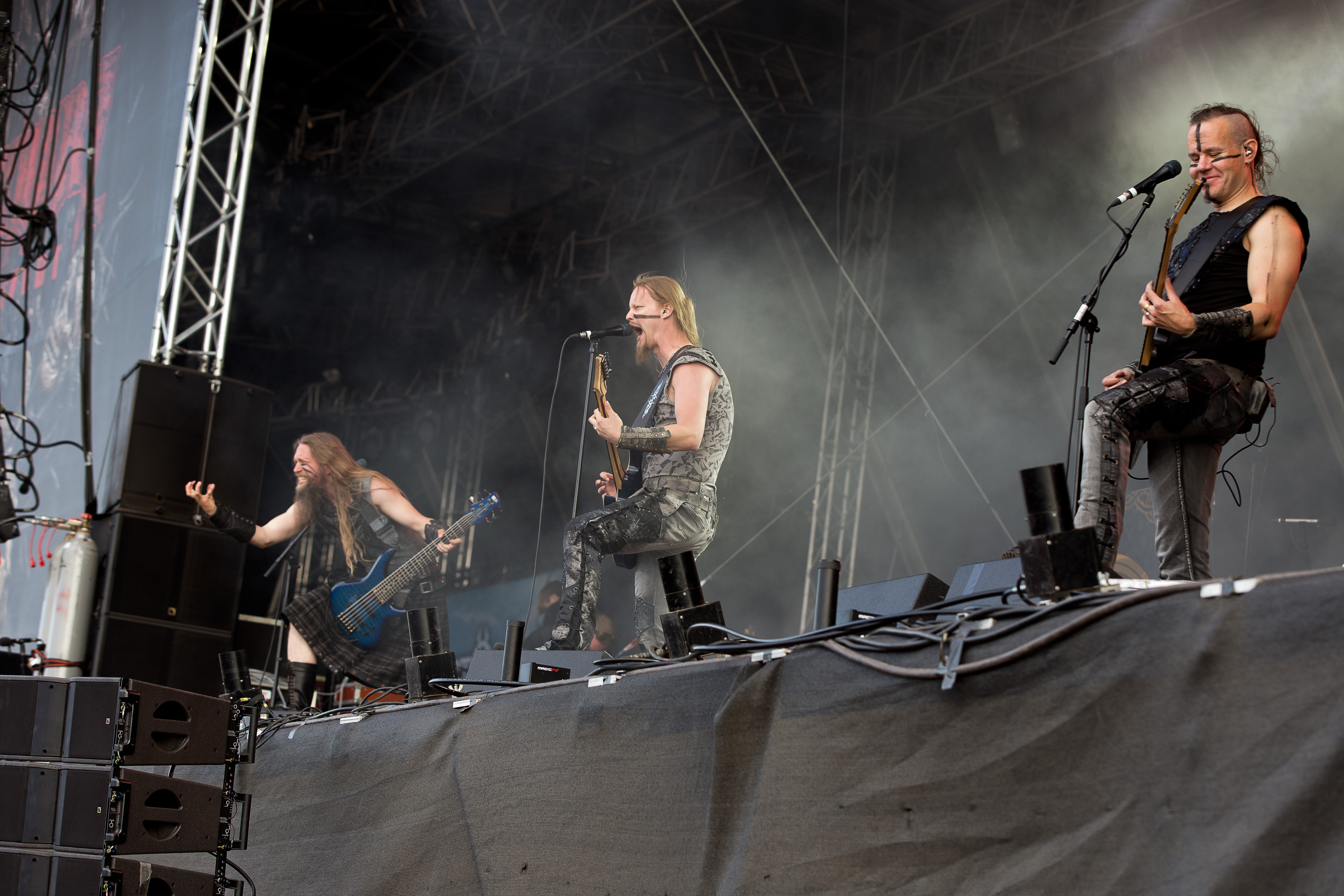
Ensiferum at Rockharz Open Air 2016 in Germany

Ensiferum's sixth album, One Man Army, was released on 20 February 2015. The album was recorded at Astia Studio with producer Anssi Kippo. A music video for the title track was released prior to the album's release. In March of that year, Ensiferum announced on their Facebook page that keyboardist Emmi Silvennoinen would not make the European and North American "One Man Army Tour" due to personal commitments at home. Former Turisas accordion player Netta Skog filled her role for the tour. Skog had performed clean vocals on the One Man Army songs "Cry for the Earth Bounds" and "Neito Pohjolan". Heri Joensen of Týr makes an appearance on the track "Heathen Horde", quoting stanza 16 of Hávamál in Old Icelandic.

On 31 March 2016, it was announced that Emmi Silvennoinen would take a leave of absence because of personal issues. Netta Skog was confirmed as her permanent replacement. The band entered the studio to record their seventh studio album, Two Paths. Anssi Kippo, who had produced One Man Army, was chosen to produce. The band focused on a more "organic" sound for Two Paths, using analog recording and neglecting to use a click track for certain songs. Two Paths was released on 15 September 2017.

Skog left the band in December 2017.

=== Thalassic and Winter Storm (2020−present) ===
On 7 January 2020, the band announced that they had begun recording a follow-up to Two Paths, at Studio Petrax in Hollola, Finland. This release coincided with the band's 25th anniversary.

On 27 February, the band confirmed Pekka Montin as their new keyboard player and clean vocalist.

The single "Rum, Women, Victory" was released on 6 May, followed by a music video of the second single "Andromeda" on 17 June. The band's eighth studio album, Thalassic, was released on 10 July 2020.

The band's ninth studio album, Winter Storm, was released on 18 October 2024.

The band is on tour in support of DragonForce's Inhuman Rampage 20th anniversary tour through December 2026, and Orden Ogan's Tour of the Grave in January 2027.

== Musical style ==
The band has been described as folk metal, melodic death metal, power metal and Viking metal.

== Band members ==
Ensiferum, band members live at Rockharz 2026

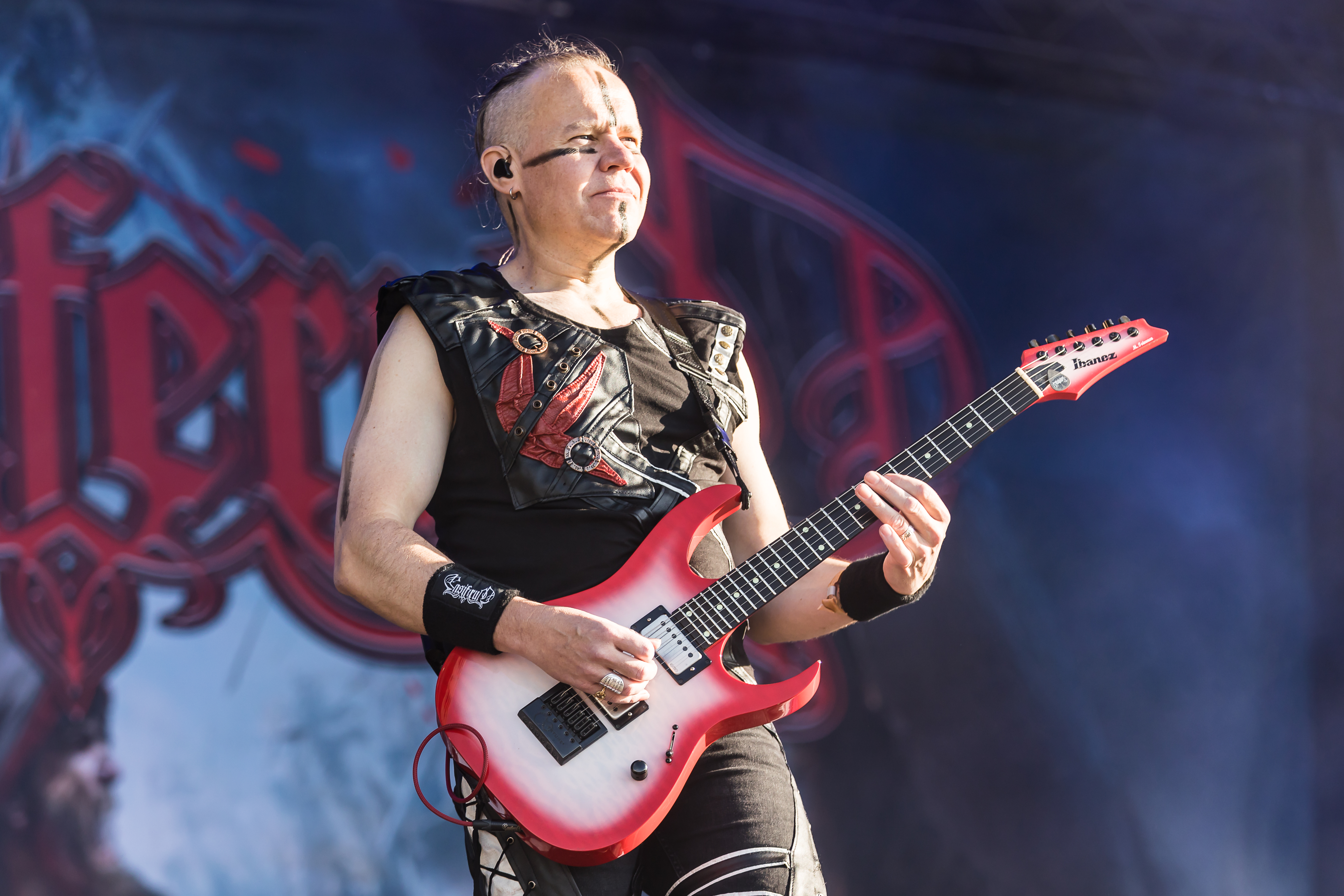
Guitarist Markus Toivonen

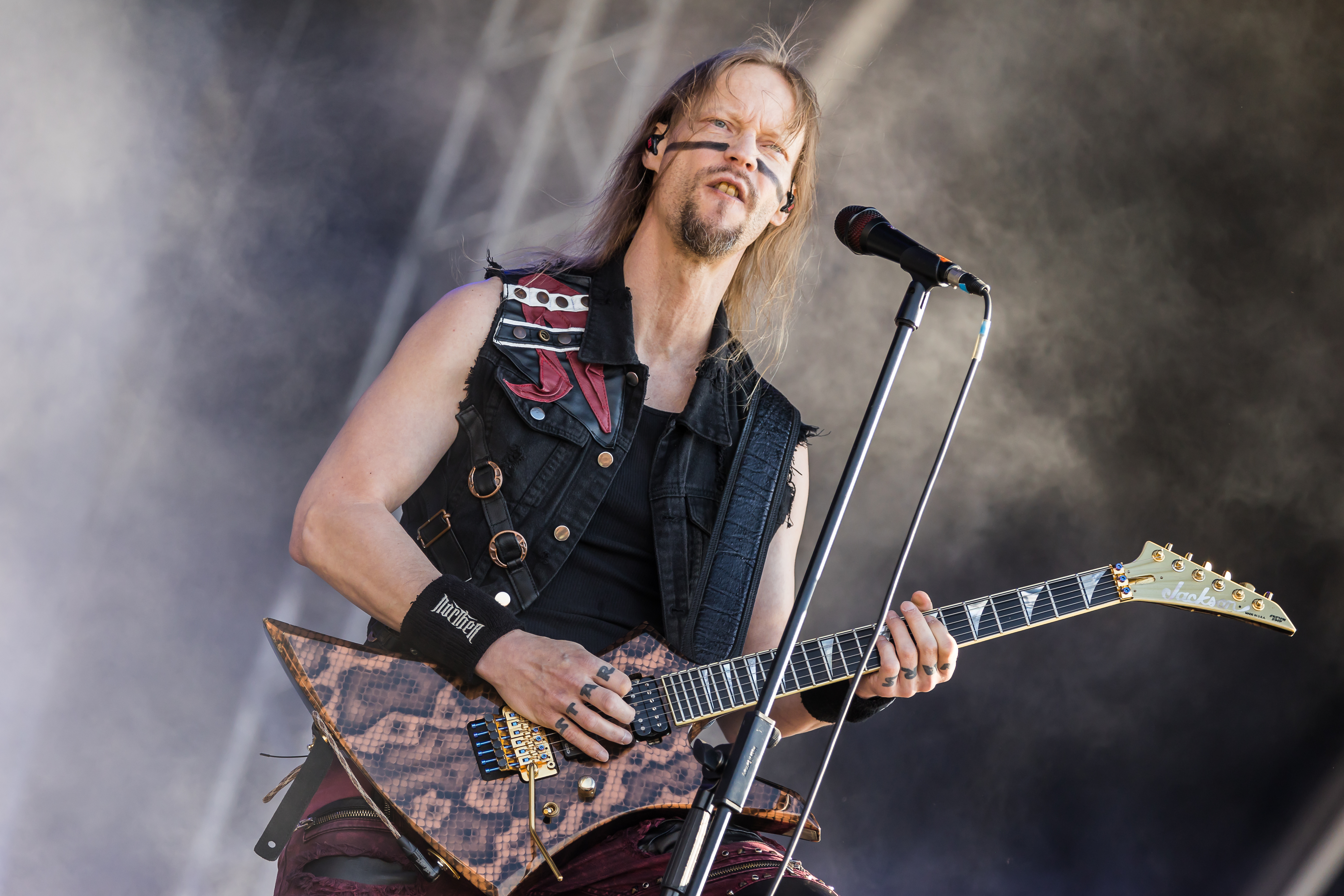
Guitarist/harsh vocalist Petri Lindroos

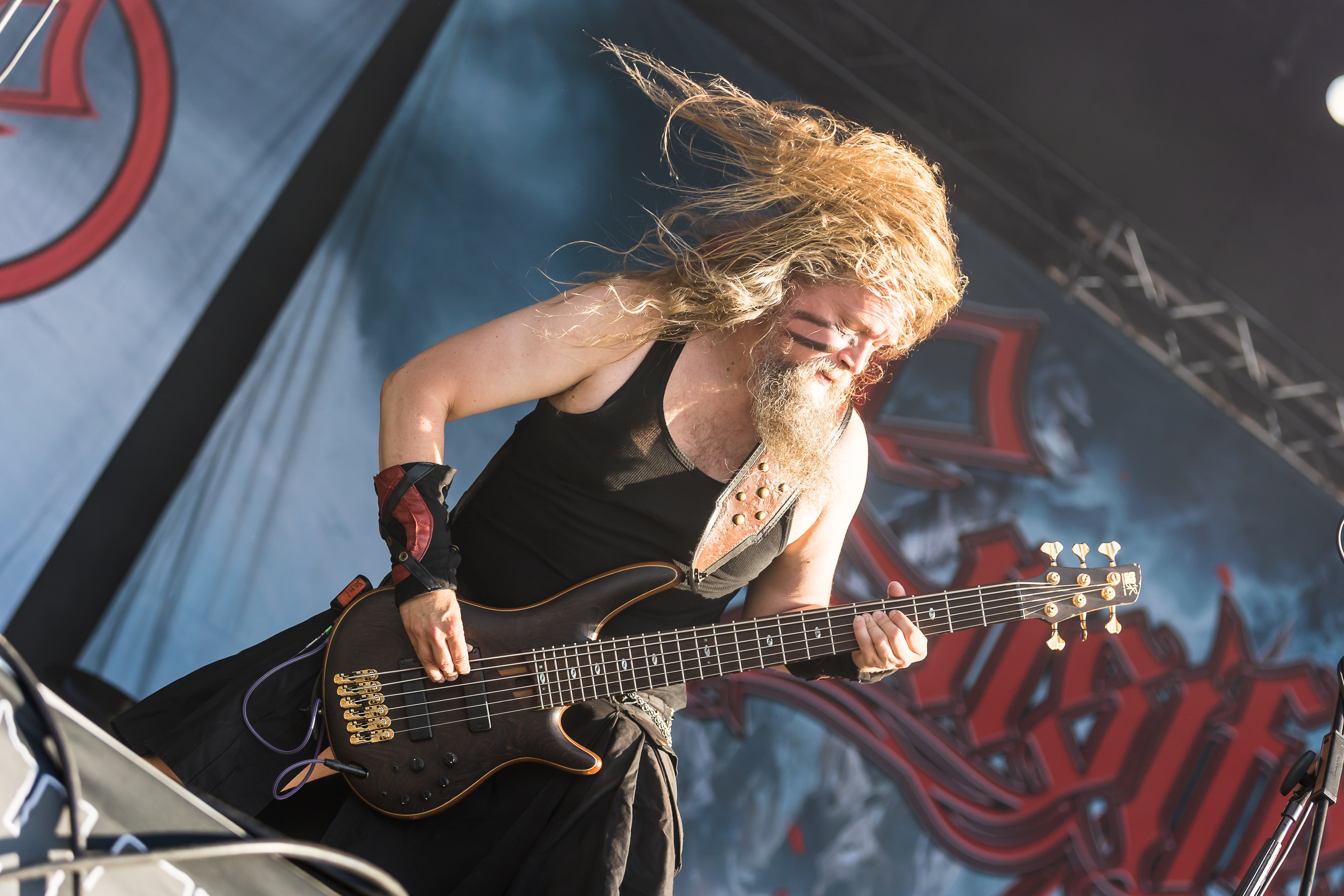
Bassist/vocalist Sami Hinkka

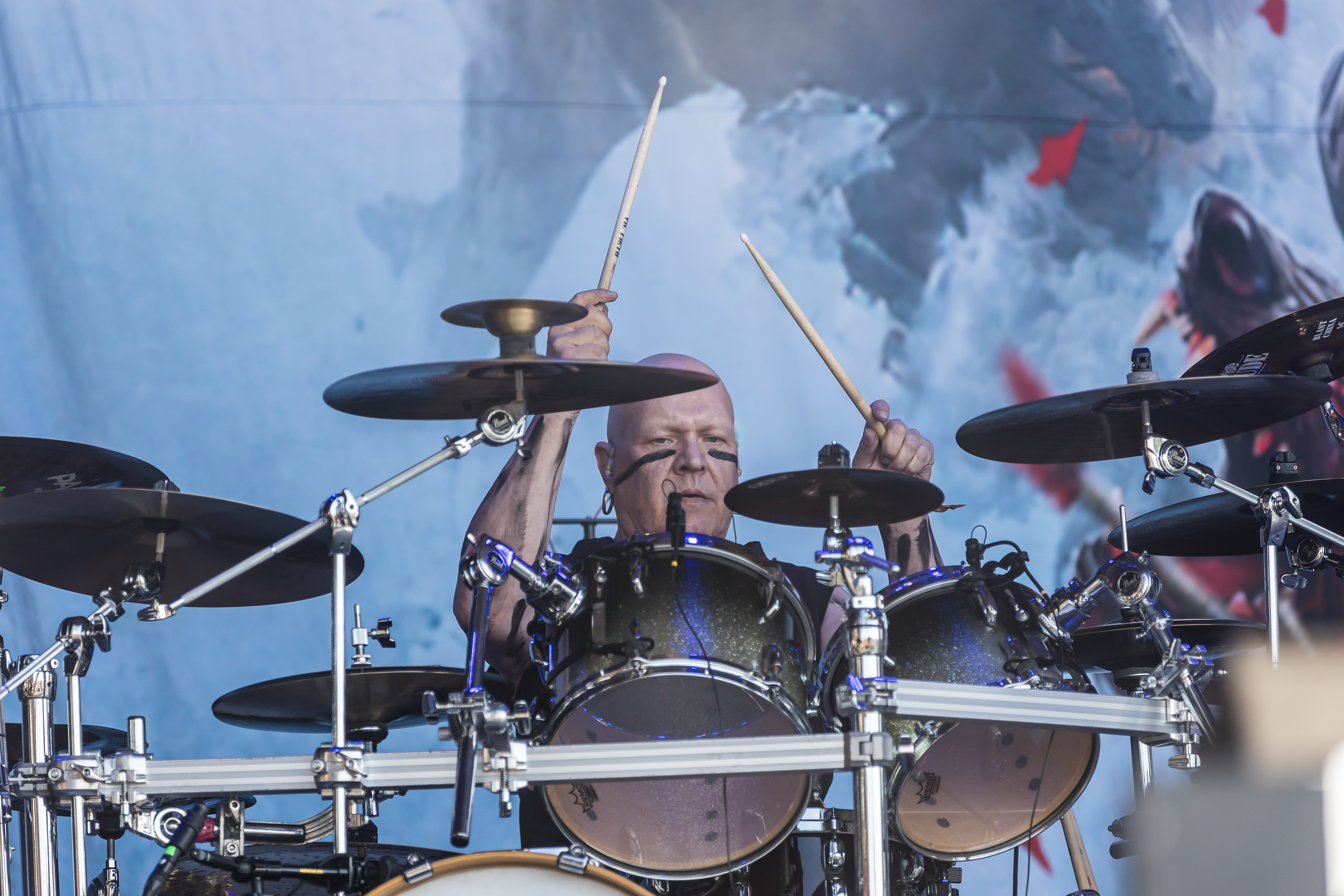
Drummer Janne Parviainen

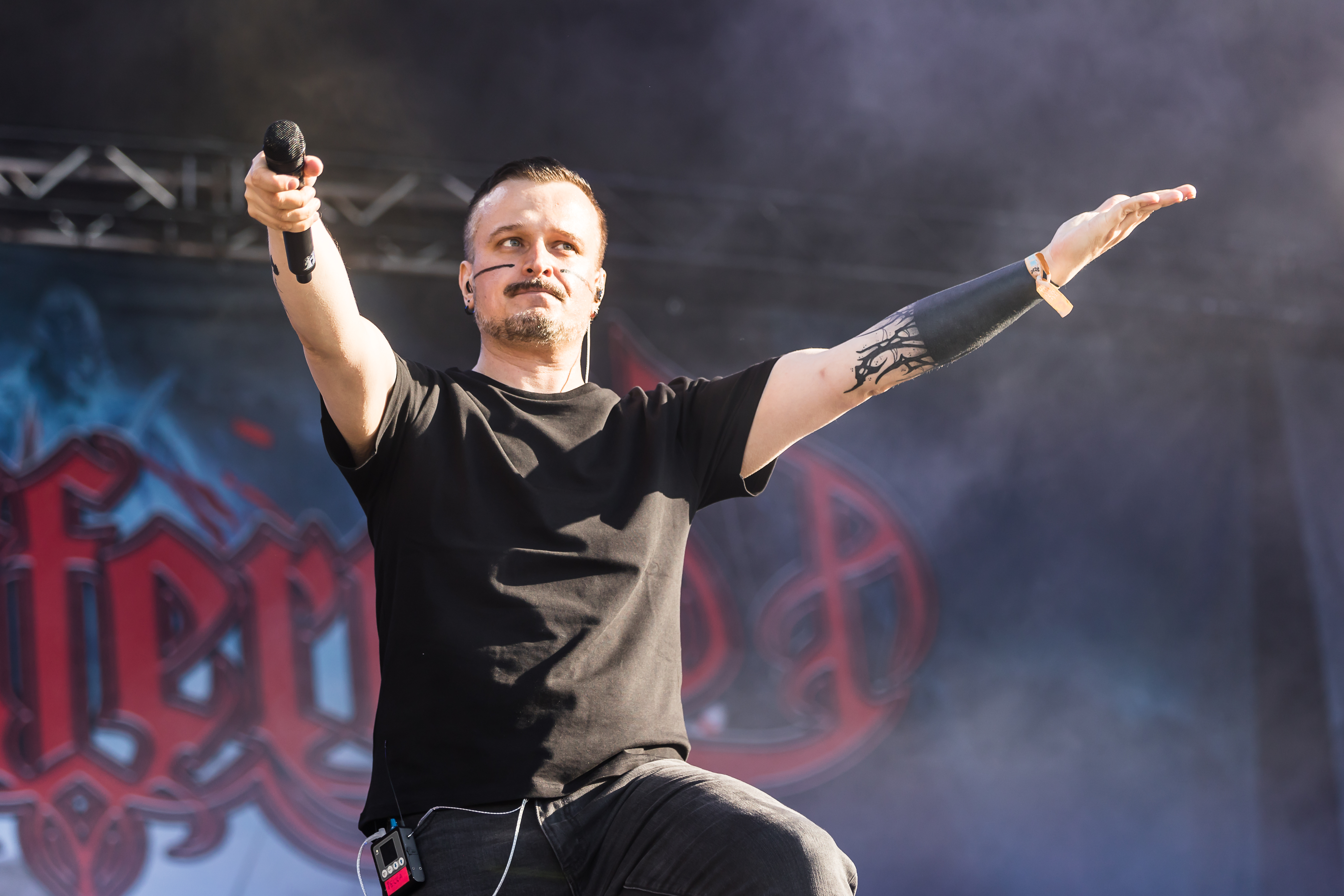
Keyboardist/clean vocalist Pekka Montin

=== Current ===
- Markus Toivonen – guitars, backing vocals (1995–present), clean vocals (2004–2020)
- Petri Lindroos – guitars, harsh vocals (2004–present)
- Sami Hinkka – bass, clean and harsh vocals (2004–present)
- Janne Parviainen – drums (2005–present)
- Pekka Montin – keyboards, clean vocals (2020–present)

=== Touring ===
- Jari Mäenpää – guitars, lead vocals (2027-present)

=== Former ===
- Sauli Savolainen – bass (1995–1998)
- Kimmo Miettinen – drums (1995–1998)
- Jari Mäenpää – lead vocals, guitars (1996–2004)
- Oliver Fokin – drums (1998–2005)
- Jukka-Pekka Miettinen – bass (1998–2004)
- Meiju Enho – keyboards (2001–2007)
- Emmi Silvennoinen – keyboards, backing vocals (2007–2016)
- Netta Skog – electric accordion, female vocals (2016–2017)

== Discography ==
=== Studio albums ===
- Ensiferum (2001)
- Iron (2004)
- Victory Songs (2007)
- From Afar (2009)
- Unsung Heroes (2012)
- One Man Army (2015)
- Two Paths (2017)
- Thalassic (2020)
- Winter Storm (2024)

=== Compilation albums ===
- 1997–1999 (2005)
- Two Decades of Greatest Sword Hits (2016)

=== EPs ===
- Dragonheads (2006)
- Suomi Warmetal (2014)

=== Live DVD ===
- 10th Anniversary Live (2006)
- Ensiferum Acoustic Live @ On the Rocks, Helsinki, Finland 28.10.2016 (DVD included in the Two Paths limited edition) (2017)

=== Videos ===
- "Ahti" (2007)
- "From Afar" (2009)
- "Twilight Tavern" (2009)
- "One More Magic Potion" (2010)
- "In My Sword I Trust" (2012)
- "One Man Army" (2015)
- "Way of the Warrior" (2017)
- "For Those About to Fight for Metal" (2019)
- "Rum, Women, Victory" (2020)
- "Andromeda" (2020)
- "Run from the Crushing Tide" (2021)
- "Winter Storm Vigilantes" (2024)

=== Singles ===
- "Tale of Revenge" (2004)
- "One More Magic Potion" (2007)
- "From Afar" (2009)
- "Stone Cold Metal" (2010)
- "Burning Leaves" (2012)
- "In My Sword I Trust" (2012)
- "One Man Army" (2015)
- "Way of The Warrior" (2017)
- "For Those About to Fight for Metal" (2019)
- "Rum, Women, Victory" (2020)
- "Andromeda" (2020)
- "Winter Storm Vigilantes" (2024)
- "Long Cold Winter of Sorrow and Strife" (2024)

=== Demos ===
- Demo (1997)
  1. "Frost"
  2. "Old Man (Väinämöinen)"
  3. "Knighthood"
- Demo II (1998)
  1. "Dreamer's Prelude"
  2. "Little Dreamer (Väinämöinen part II)"
  3. "Warrior's Quest"
  4. "White Storm"
- Demo III: Hero in a Dream (1999)
  1. "Intro"
  2. "Hero in a Dream"
  3. "Eternal Wait"
  4. "Battle Song"
  5. "Guardians of Fate"

=== Cover songs ===
==== Recorded cover songs ====
- "Into Hiding" (by Amorphis from Tales from the Thousand Lakes) − Found on Dragonheads, 10th Anniversary Live as a live version and Victory Songs Special Edition
- "Battery" (by Metallica from Master of Puppets) − Found on "Tale of Revenge" single and Iron digipak
- "Lady in Black" (by Uriah Heep from Salisbury) − Found on "One More Magic Potion" single and Victory Songs digipak and Japanese version
- "Breaking the Law" (by Judas Priest from British Steel) − Found on the digipak version of their eponymous album. Song was covered again in 2010 and released as a bonus track of "Stone Cold Metal" digital single.
- "Vandraren" (by Nordman) – Found on the limited-edition version of From Afar
- "Wrathchild" (by Iron Maiden) − Released as a bonus track of "Burning Leaves" digital single
- "Bamboleo" (by Gipsy Kings) − Released as a bonus track on "Unsung Heroes"

==== Covers only played live ====
- "Battle Hymn" (by Manowar)
- "Enter Sandman" (by Metallica)
- "Fight Fire with Fire" (by Metallica)
- "Näitä polkuja tallaan" (by Matti ja Teppo)
- "Olen suomalainen" (by Kari Tapio)
- "Rentun Ruusu" (by Irwin Goodman)
- "Run to the Hills" (by Iron Maiden)
- "The Trooper" (by Iron Maiden)
- "Tsingis Khan" (by Frederik)
- "Sweet Child o' Mine" (by Guns N' Roses)
