= Nosturi =

Cultural venue and former warehouse in Helsinki, Finland

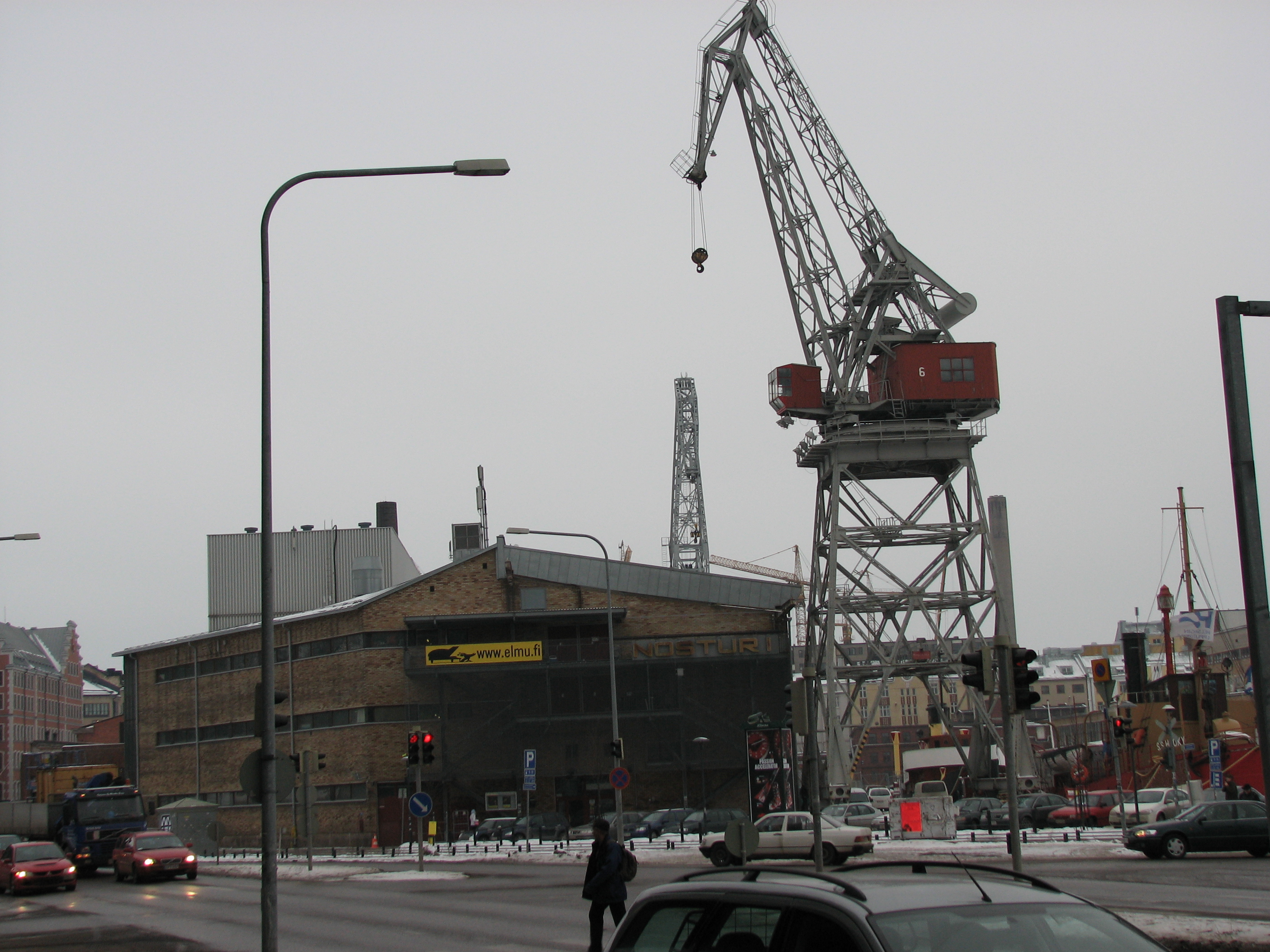
- Nosturi and a "nosturi", as seen from a nearby street in winter.
- Interactive map of Nosturi
- Address: Telakkakatu 8
- Location: Helsinki, Finland
- Coordinates: 60°09′35″N 24°55′51″E
- Owner: Elmu
- Capacity: 900

Website
- www.elmu.fi

Nosturi (Finnish for "crane") was a culture and music hall and a nightclub in the Punavuori district of Helsinki, Finland. It was owned by the Association of Live Music (Elävän musiikin yhdistys, ELMU).

The hall was located at the seaside in Hietalahti next to the Hietalahti shipyard in an old cargo terminal building. It got its name from the old crane (Hietalahti crane number 6) located right next to it. Many popular live music festivals were held at Nosturi throughout the years. The ELMU had its premises in Nosturi from 1999 to 2019. Before that it operated in the legendary Lepakko nearby.

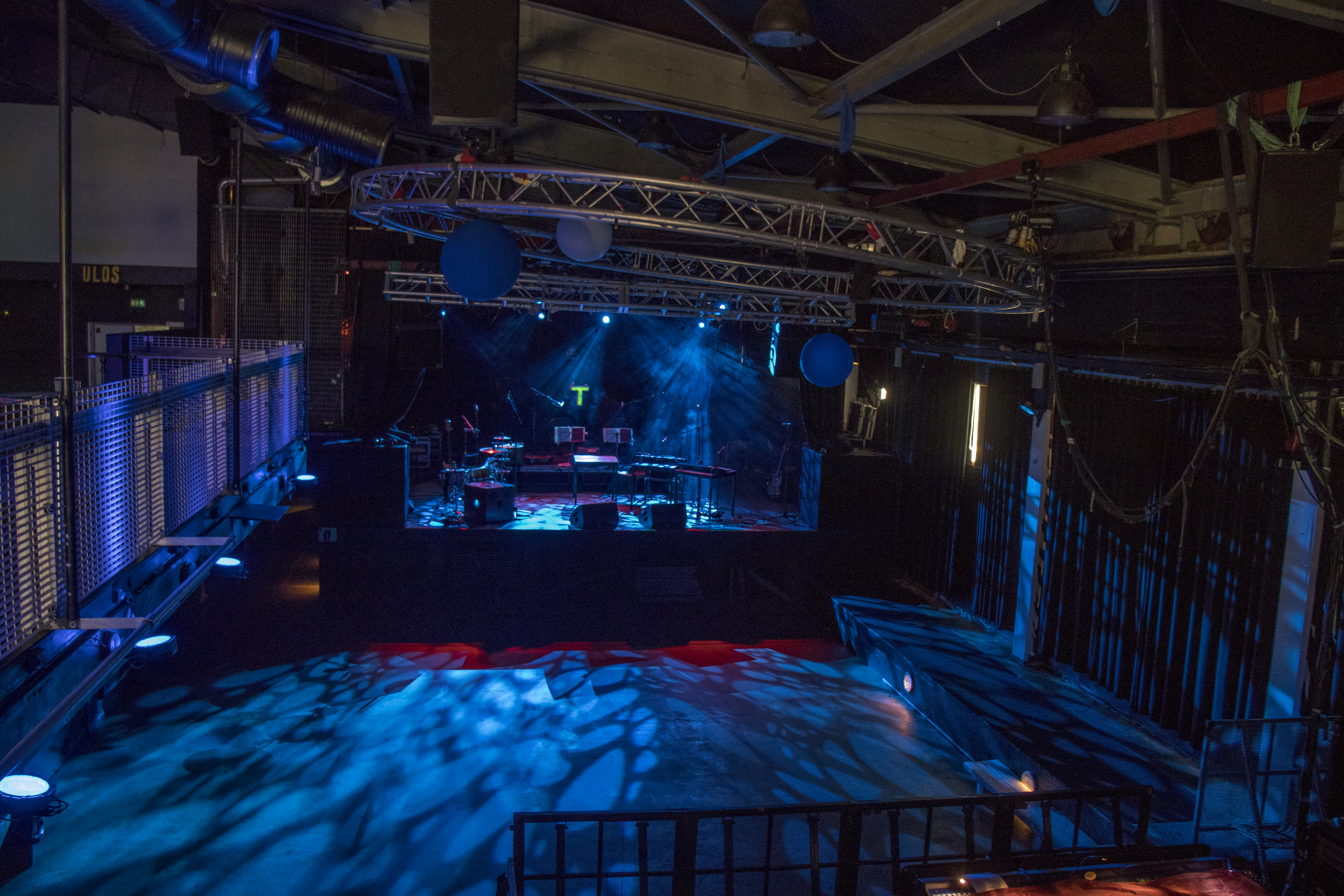
Nosturi's concert hall

Over the years, many bands played there, most notably HIM, sukekiyo, Children of Bodom, Lordi, Laibach, Bloodhound Gang, CKY, Iconcrash, Anthrax, Motörhead, Papa Roach, DragonForce, Ensiferum, Jenni Vartiainen, Hanoi Rocks and Turisas.

Nosturi was dismantled in 2020 when the easternmost part of the former dock area, Telakkaranta, will be rebuilt as a residential area. According to the plans at the time, ELMU was to get new premises in a protected old machinery hall nearby. These plans were cancelled because of too high costs, as were the plans to move to the former gas repositories in Suvilahti. According to the culture services chief of Helsinki Stuba Nikula, it is pretty clear that new premises wouldn't be found until Nosturi was dismantled. Dismantling the Nosturi building started in January 2020.
