= Py Bäckman =

Swedish musician (born 1948)

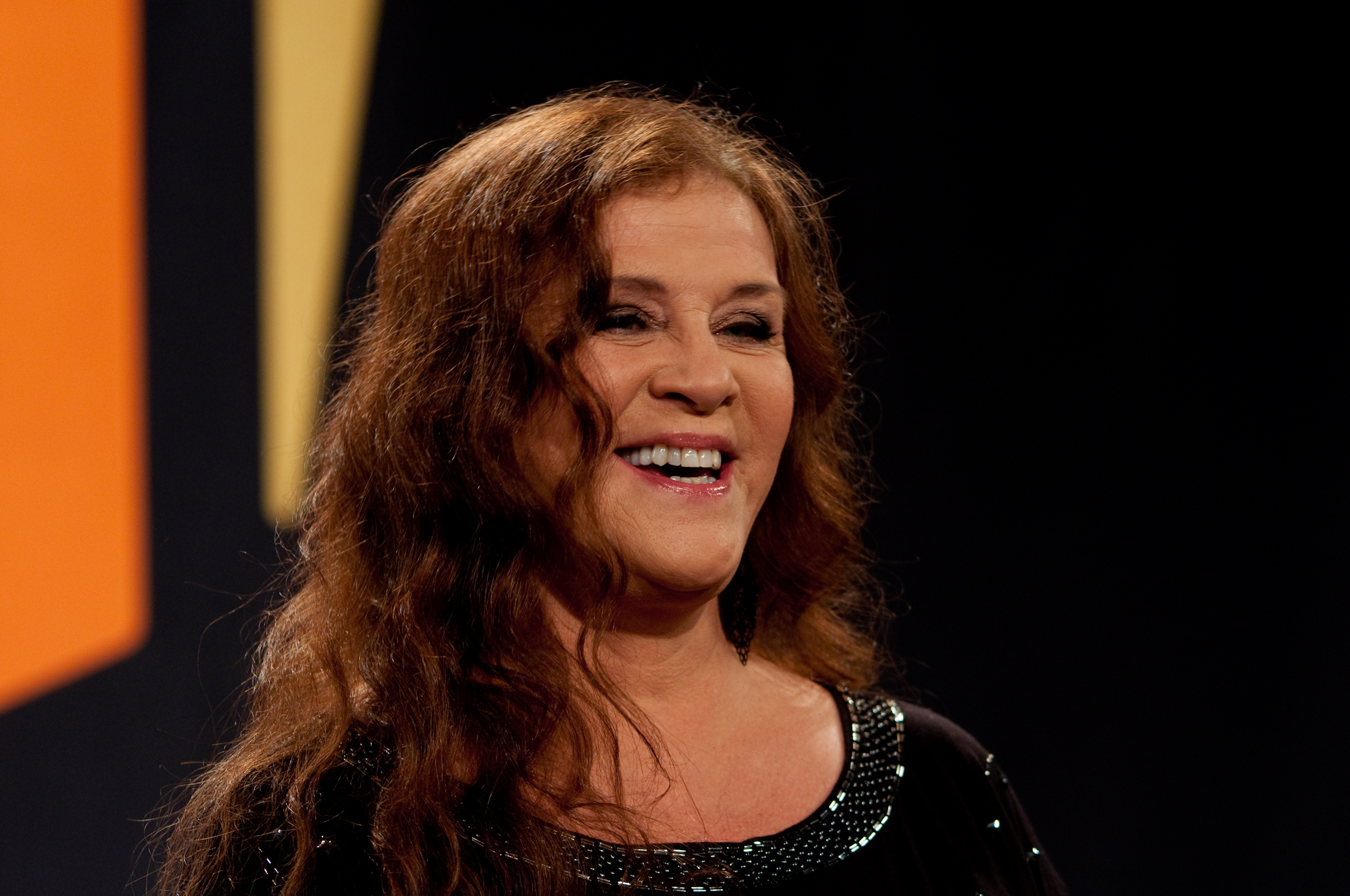
- Py Bäckman in 2009

Background information
- Birth name: Py Marie Elisabet Ulrika Bäckman
- Born: 5 July 1948 (age 76); Stockholm, Sweden
- Genres: Pop
- Occupation: artist singer songwriter
- Instrument(s): Piano harmonica
- Years active: 1973–present
- Website: pybackman.se

Py Marie Elisabet Ulrika Bäckman Wennborn (born 5 July 1948) is a Swedish musician. She is a singer and songwriter of pop and rock for musicals and films. She also plays piano and harmonica.

== Career ==
Bäckman grew up in Iggesund (Gävleborg County) and started her career at nine years old when she was discovered by a touring radio show. After that, she was called up by the Swedish TV show host, Lennart Hyland, and came down to Stockholm, where she made her TV debut in 1957. After the television appearance, she toured around and sang songs in various public parks. As a teenager, she thought it was frivolous singing pop music and began instead with rock music.

In 1973, she began touring across Europe as a lead singer with Sweden's girl rock group NQB. During the late 1970s and 1980s, she worked a lot with her former partner Dan Hylander. The couple shared the backing band Raj Montana Band, with whom she had a breakthrough album, Sista Föreställningen. After the split in 1985, she continued as a solo performer. During her solo career, she has, among other things, worked with producers such as Clarence Öfwerman (former member of the Raj Montana Band and later producer of Roxette), Mats Wester and Micke Wennborn.

In addition to her solo career, Bäckman has also been very active as a songwriter for others and has worked with numerous artists. For example, she wrote "Stad i ljus", sung by Tommy Körberg, which won the Swedish preselection for Eurovision Song Contest 1988, and since 2006, is also a Swedish hymn. In 1993, she began her collaboration with Mats Wester and created the successful Swedish folk music group Nordman. Bäckman was the group's lyricist from the very beginning until 1998, when the group split. Upon reunification in 2005, she declined to continue working with the band, and was replaced by another songwriter.

Bäckman also wrote the text to the Swedish big hit "Gabriellas sång" ("Gabriella's song") in the 2004 Kay Pollak film As It Is in Heaven. Stefan Nilsson wrote the music to the song. She has also translated musicals such as Chicago, Evita, and Garbo. In 2004, Bäckman wrote new hymns, an addition to the Swedish hymn book on behalf of the Swedish Church. She also toured Sweden and Finland for some time with the jazz legend Jukka Tolonen.

In 2010, Bäckman participated once again in the Swedish preselection for Eurovision Song Contest with the song "Magic Star" (Swedish: "Magisk Stjärna"), which she wrote together with Micke Wennborn. She was noted for being the only person playing an actual instrument (the harmonica) live on stage in the Swedish pre selection since 1999, and also for being the only Swedish artist participating in the Swedish pre selection for five decades in a row.

In March, the double album P20Y10 was released, and was Bäckman's ninth studio album. It was produced by Micke Wennborn, who was also included as a guitar player in the band, together with David Garfield on keyboards, Leland Sklar on bass, and John "JR" Robinson on drums and percussion. P20Y10 was recorded in Castle Oaks, Los Angeles, and engineered by Steve Sykes.

== Discography ==
=== Studio albums ===
- 1979 – Let it Ride
- 1981 – Hard Wind Blows
- 1983 – Sista föreställningen (with Raj Montana Band)
- 1984 – Kvinna från Tellus (with Raj Montana Band)
- 1986 – Narrarna dansar
- 1987 – Natt 1001
- 1991 – I rosornas tid
- 2006 – När mörkret faller
- 2010 – P20Y10

=== Live albums ===
- 1982 – Belle De Jour (with Raj Montana Band)
- 1984 – Tele-Gram Långt Farväl (with Raj Montana Band)
- 2008 – Sånger från jorden till himmelen

=== Greatest hits albums ===
- 1997 – Hits! 1980-97 (with Raj Montana Band)
- 1998 – Svenska popfavoriter - 15 hits (with Raj Montana Band)
- 2000 – Spotlight

=== Singles, maxi singles and remixes ===
- 1980 – Fast Train's Running [B: For A loved One]
- 1982 – Se Dagen Vakna [B: När Änglarna Dör]
- Ge Mej Liv [B: Vem är Vem]
- Kristall [B: Belle De Jour]
- 1984 – Svindlande Höjder
- 1986 – Camelot
- 1986 – Con-Cordelia [B: Till Prydnad]
- 1986 – Fred Nu [B: Soldaterna]
- Framtiden Avgörs Nu [B: My Crime]
- 1988 – Papa [B: Kung För Ett Gycklarhov]
- 1988 – Du Är Vacker Johnny [B: Tysta Ljus]
- 1988 – Speaking [bonus single with the album "Natt 1001"]
- 1991 – [Om Du Vill] Leka [B: Bra Man]
- 1991 – [Om Du Vill] Leka [B: Förlorat Paradis]
- 1991 – När Blommorna Föll [B: Stenarna Fick liv Inatt]
- 1991 – När Blommorna Föll [B: Förlorat Paradis]
- 1992 – Långt Härifrån
- 1997 – Pandoras Ask [B: Jag Lever]
- 1997 – Änglarna Ropar I Mörkret
- 2006 – Oh Mamma
- 2006 – Kär I Kärlek
- 2006 – När Helvetet Blir Kallt
- 2009 – So Long Min Kära
- 2009 – Tids-sången
- 2010 – Magisk Stjärna
- 2010 – Jag Är Fri
