= Rapture (Finnish band) =

Finnish doom/melodic death metal band

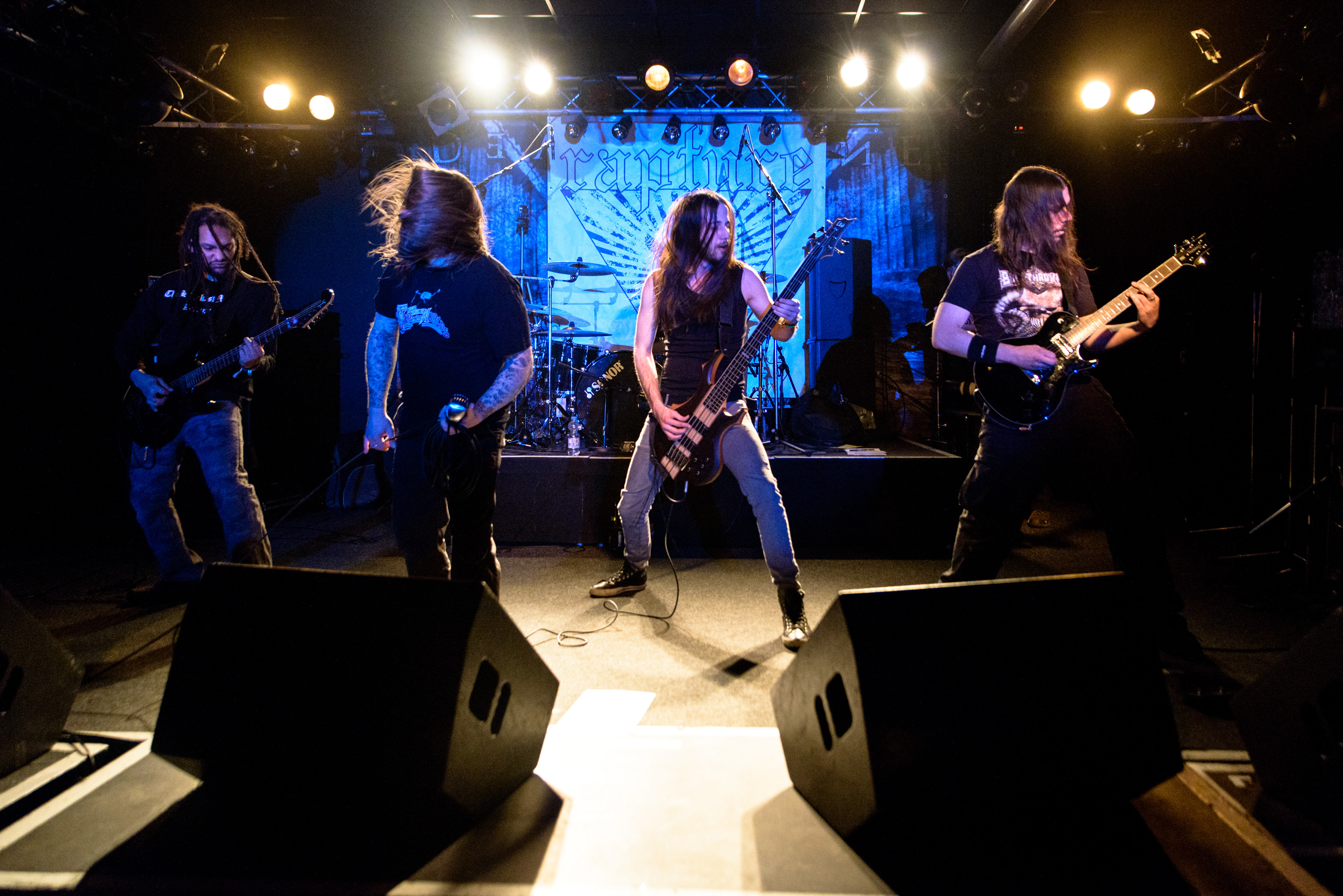
- Rapture at the Dark Munich Festival 2014

Background information
- Origin: Helsinki, Finland
- Genres: Doom metal, melodic death metal
- Years active: 1997–present
- Labels: Spinefarm Records, Relapse Records, Century Media
- Members: Petri Eskelinen; Tomi Ullgren; Aleksi Ahokas; Pete Raatikainen
- Past members: Henri Villberg; Jarno Salomaa; Joni Öhman; Sami Hinkka; Samuel Ruotsalainen

Rapture is a Finnish doom metal/melodic death metal band formed in 1997 in Helsinki.

== History ==
In 1999, Rapture signed with Spinefarm Records and released their debut album, Futile, in late 1999. The album was licensed to Relapse Records for distribution outside of Finland. In early 2002, the band recorded their second effort,Songs for the Withering. This album sold better than their debut and gave Rapture recognition beyond the local scene, leading to a contract with Century Media. Rapture released their third album, Silent Stage, in 2005. This album continued in the vein of the previous two, with a morose, depressive atmosphere and clean vocals and death growls. The band is currently without a record label.

== Members ==
=== Current members ===
- Petri Eskelinen – vocals
- Tomi Ullgren – guitar
- Aleksi Ahokas – guitar
- Pete Raatikainen – drums

=== Former members ===
- Henri Villberg – vocals
- Jarno Salomaa – guitar
- Joni Öhman – bass
- Sami Hinkka – bass
- Samuel Ruotsalainen – drums

== Discography ==
- Broken Daydream (Demo, 1998)
- Futile (1999)
- Songs for the Withering (2002)
- Silent Stage (2005)
