= Netta Skog =

Finnish accordionist

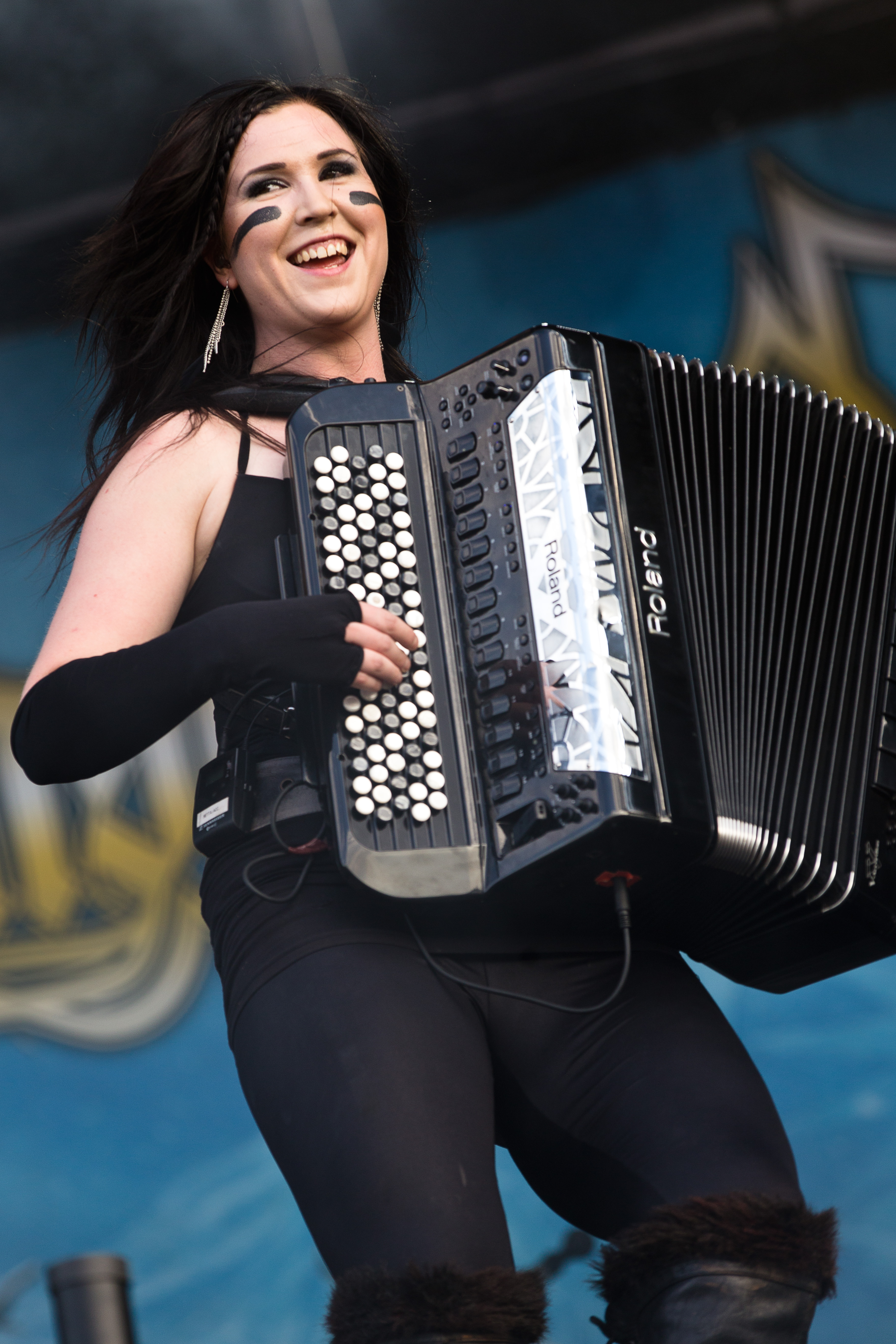
- Skog performing with Ensiferum in 2016

Background information
- Born: 1989 or 1990 (age 35–36)
- Genres: Folk metal; melodic death metal; classical; schlager
- Occupation: Musician
- Instruments: Accordion, vocals
- Years active: 2006–present
- Formerly of: Turisas, Dark Sarah, Ensiferum
- Website: www.nettaskog.com

Netta Skog (b. 1989–1990) is a Finnish accordionist and singer. She plays the button accordion, both acoustic and digital.

== Career ==
Skog won Finland's annual Kultainen Harmonikka (lit. 'Golden Accordion') contest in 2006, aged 16, making her its youngest winner.

She also won the gold medal in the 2015 International Digital Accordion competition of the Confédération Internationale des Accordéonistes.

She was chosen as the 2024 accordionist of the year (Vuoden Harmonikkataiteilija) by the Finnish Accordion Association.

Although she also plays traditional accordion music such as tango and schlager, and reached the 2013 final of the Tangomarkkinat festival competition, Skog is especially known for performing music from genres not traditionally associated with the accordion, such as heavy metal, film scores, and classical music. For example, in the Kultainen Harmonikka contest, she performed Nightwish's "Dead to the World" and the 2004 Eurovision Song Contest winner "Wild Dances". She has said that her objective is to take the accordion to new audiences and encourage young musicians to take it up.

She has been at various times a touring guest of the Finnish metal bands Turisas, Nightwish, Dark Sarah, and Ensiferum, as well as performing in a guest capacity with Children of Bodom, Mokoma, and the Swiss folk metal group Eluveitie.
