= Mats Wester =

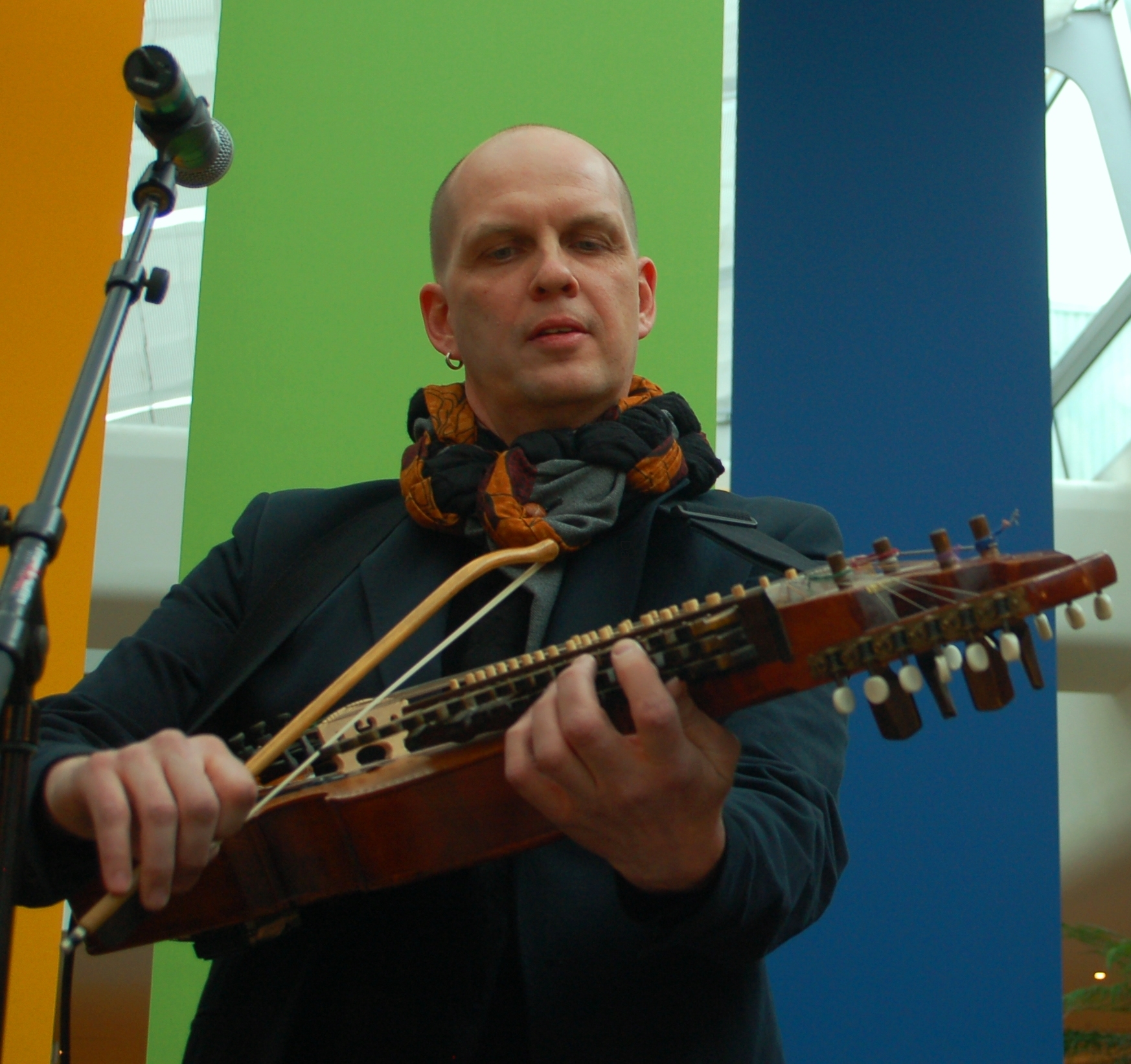
Mats Wester (2008)

Mats Wester (born September 1, 1964 in Botkyrka, Sweden) is a musician and plays the nyckelharpa. Mats studied at Adolf Fredriks Musik Skola in Stockholm. Together with the singer Håkan Hemlin he operates the musical group Nordman. During Nordman's long pause Mats created another group together with Py Bäckman (lyrics) and Elenor Ågeryd (vocals). Mats has also written a song for the group Garmarna "En gång ska han gråta" (Once he will cry). As many times before Py Bäckman wrote the lyrics to the song.

Mats Wester was one of four musicians brought together by blues rock singer/guitar player Joe Bonamassa to perform on a variety of instruments in a July 3, 2012 acoustic concert at the Vienna Opera House. None of the five had ever worked together nor even met until they arrived in Vienna where three days later they put on a live performance. The event was released on March 12, 2013 on CD&DVD/Blu-Ray titled An Acoustic Evening At The Vienna Opera House and in 2014 was broadcast on a PBS special.

According to Nordman's Website, Mats is the musical mastermind of the group, and that the music is his passion, hobby and life.

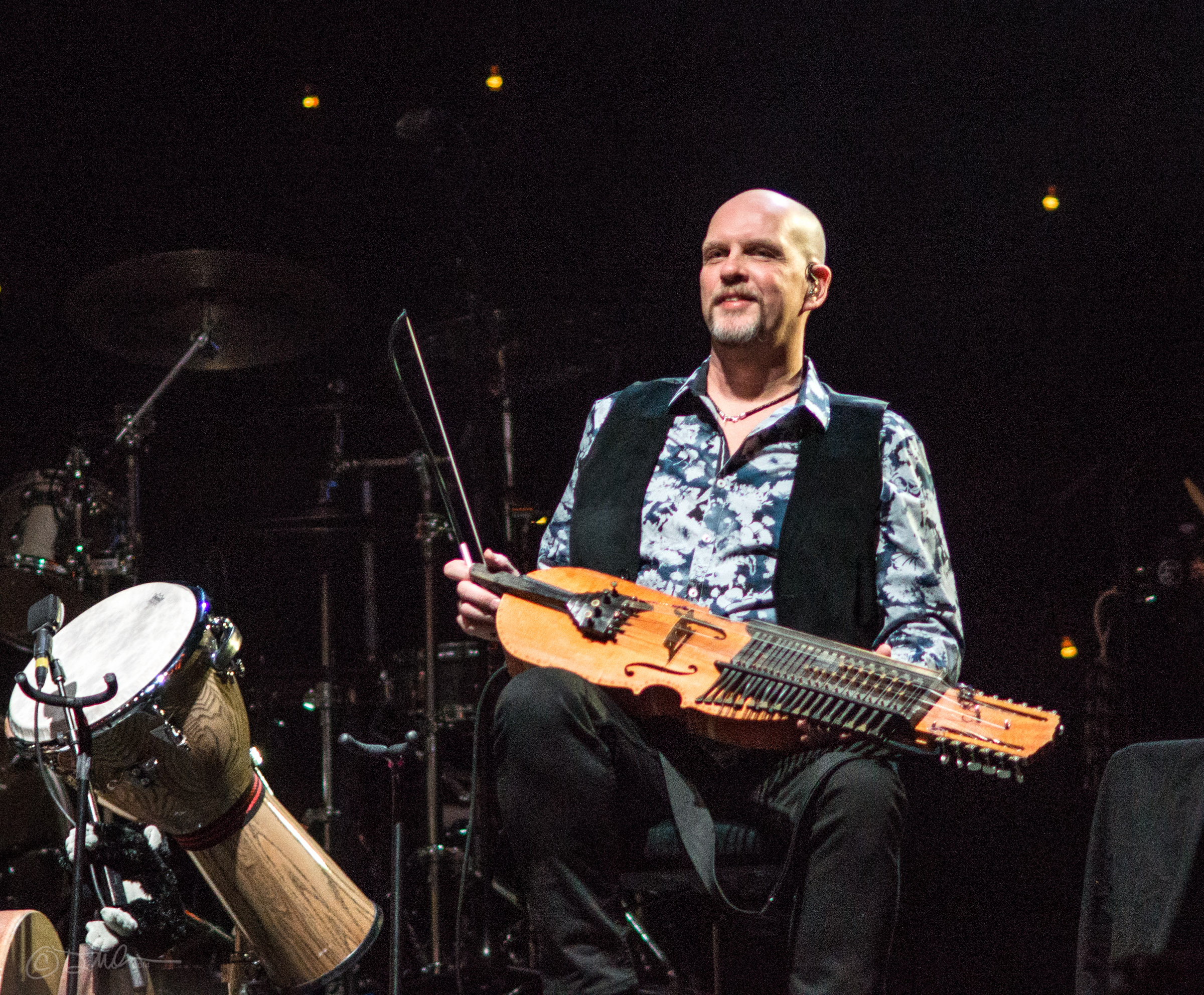
Mats Wester-Radio City Music Hall-with Joe Bonamassa Jan 2015
