= Petri Lindroos =

Finnish heavy metal musician

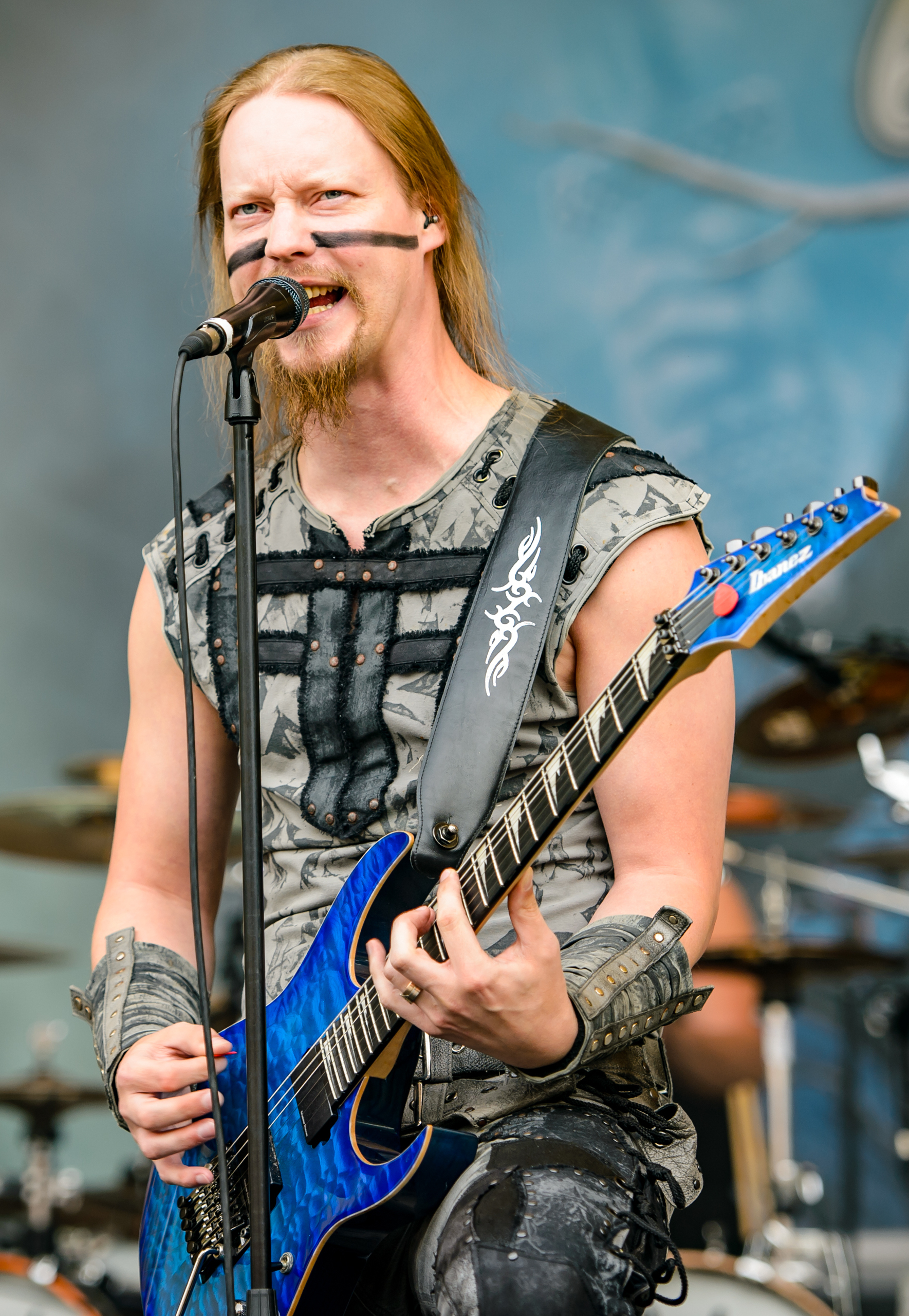
- Lindroos performing with Ensiferum in 2016

Background information
- Also known as: Pete
- Born: 10 January 1980 (age 46); Espoo, Finland
- Origin: Helsinki, Finland
- Genres: Melodic death metal, power metal, folk metal, viking metal
- Occupation: Musician
- Instruments: Vocals, guitar
- Years active: 1996–present
- Member of: Ensiferum, Warmen, Satanic North
- Formerly of: Norther

Petri Lindroos (born 10 January 1980) is a Finnish heavy metal musician. He has been the lead vocalist/harsh vocalist and a guitarist for Ensiferum since 2004. In 2023, he joined Warmen in the same role. He was also a founding member of Norther, playing with them from 1996 to 2009.

== Biography ==
Petri (also known as "Pete") Lindroos was born in Espoo. At 14 years old, he began to play the guitar. In 1996, he founded the melodic death metal/power metal band Norther with drummer Toni Hallio. In 2004, he joined the folk metal band Ensiferum as lead vocalist and continued to perform and record with Norther until March 2009, when Norther's website announced his departure from the band to focus more on his duties with Ensiferum. Lindroos said later in an interview that he did not want to quit the band, and on the contrary, the band members forced him to. In 2019, Ensiferum drummer Janne Parviainen and Petri Lindroos (under the pseudonym "IIT Caprae") formed the black metal band Satanic North, where Lindroos performs bass and backing vocals.

== Discography ==
=== With Norther ===
- Warlord (2000) – Demo
- Released (2002) – CD single
- Dreams of Endless War (2002) – CD
- Unleash Hell (2003) – CD single
- Mirror of Madness (2003) – CD
- Spreading Death (2004) – CD/DVD single
- Death Unlimited (2004) – CD
- Solution 7 EP (2005) – Mini CD
- Scream (2006) – CD single
- Till Death Unites Us (2006) – CD
- No Way Back (2007) – EP
- N (2008)

=== With Ensiferum ===
- Dragonheads (2006) EP
- One More Magic Potion (2007) CD single
- Victory Songs (2007) CD
- From Afar (2009) CD
- Unsung Heroes (2012) CD
- One Man Army (2015) CD
- Two Paths (2017) CD
- Thalassic (2020) CD
- Winter Storm (2024) CD

=== With Warmen ===
- Here for None (2023) CD
- Band of Brothers (2025) CD

=== With Satanic North ===
- Four Demons (2022) Demo
- Satanic North (2024) CD
