= Janne Parviainen =

Finnish heavy metal drummer

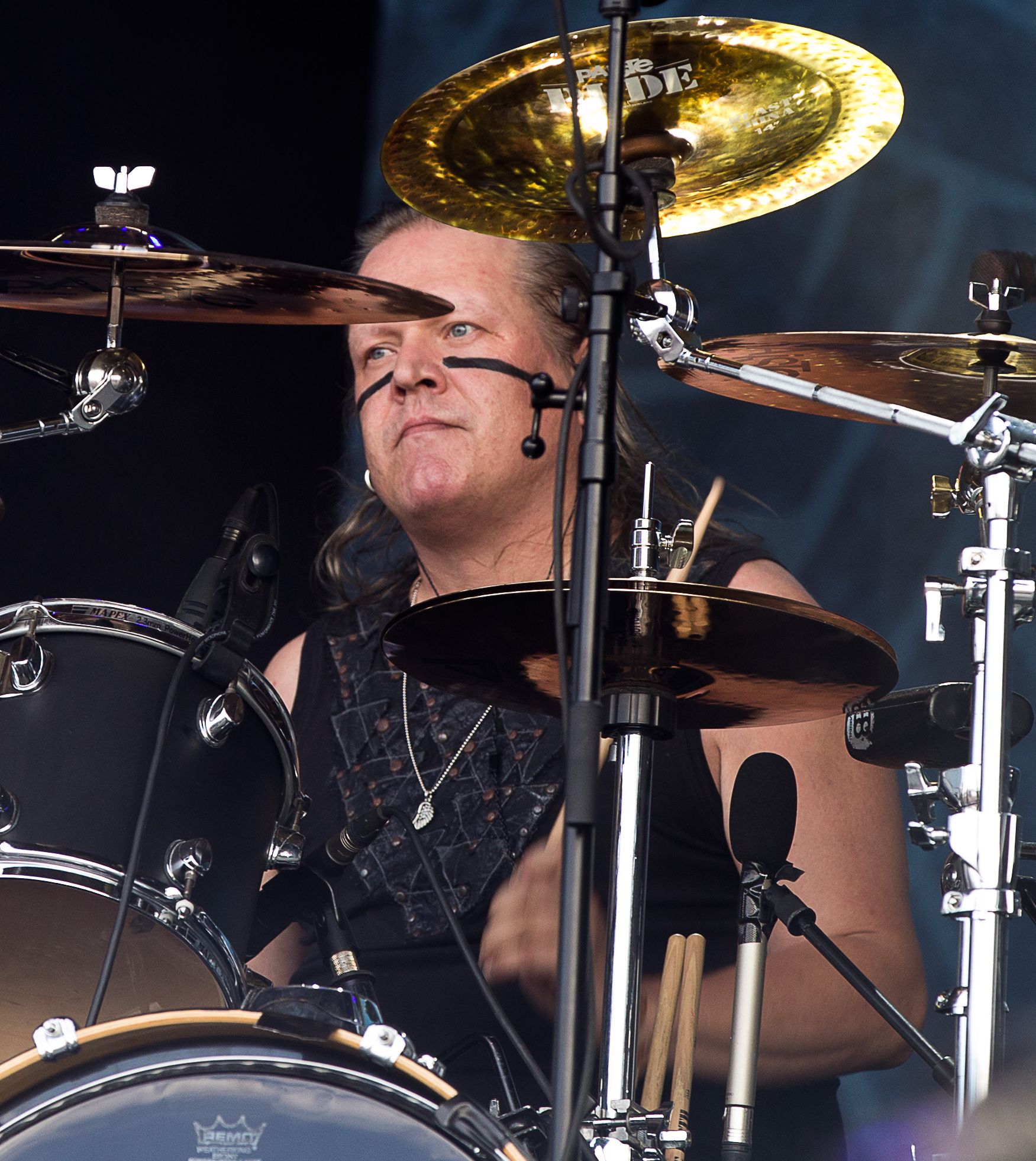
Parviainen with Ensiferum in 2016

Janne Parviainen (born 1973) is a Finnish heavy metal drummer who plays in the bands Sinergy, Barathrum and Ensiferum. He is a former member of Waltari and Zwanziger.

Parviainen joined Barathrum in 2000 and Sinergy and Ensiferum more recently. His first recording for Ensiferum was the Dragonheads EP, which was recorded soon after he joined the band in 2005 and released early the next year. He has yet to feature on a Sinergy album, having joined after the recording of their 2002 album Suicide by My Side.

Parviainen's longest time in a band was with Waltari – between 1990 and 2002, when he left to join Sinergy.
