= Sami Hinkka =

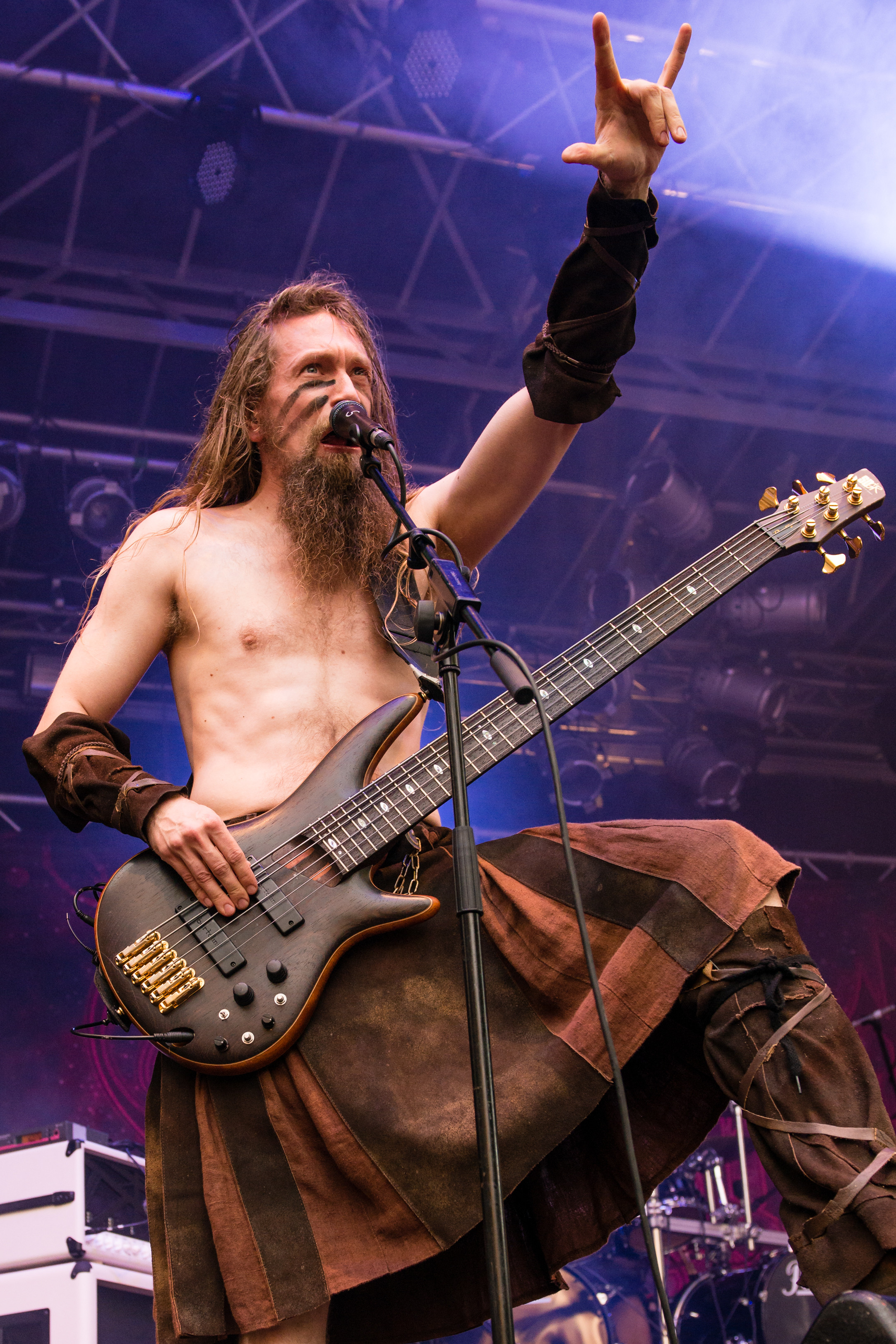
- Sami Hinkka performing at Castle Rock 2014.

Background information
- Born: 27 April 1978 (age 46)
- Origin: Finland
- Genres: Folk metal, viking metal, melodic death metal, doom metal
- Instrument(s): Bass, vocals
- Labels: Spinefarm Records

Sami Hinkka (born 27 April 1978 in Finland) is a heavy metal bass player, presently with Ensiferum. He joined his current band in 2004 as a replacement for Jukka-Pekka Miettinen after playing for some years in the melodic death/doom metal band Rapture. He left his role with Rapture in 2006 and now plays only in Ensiferum.

In addition to bass guitar duties, Hinkka also performs in the role of dual backing/choir vocalist with guitarist Markus Toivonen. He has also taken over as the band's main lyricist, having written almost all of the lyrics since Victory Songs. During Ensiferum's tour to Russia in 2008 he performed as the lead vocalist due to Petri Lindroos' illness.

== Equipment ==
Hinkka uses Warwick 5 and 6 string Corvettes. He has previously used an Ibanez Prestige SR5006E, as shown in the picture.
