= Markus Toivonen =

Finnish heavy metal musician

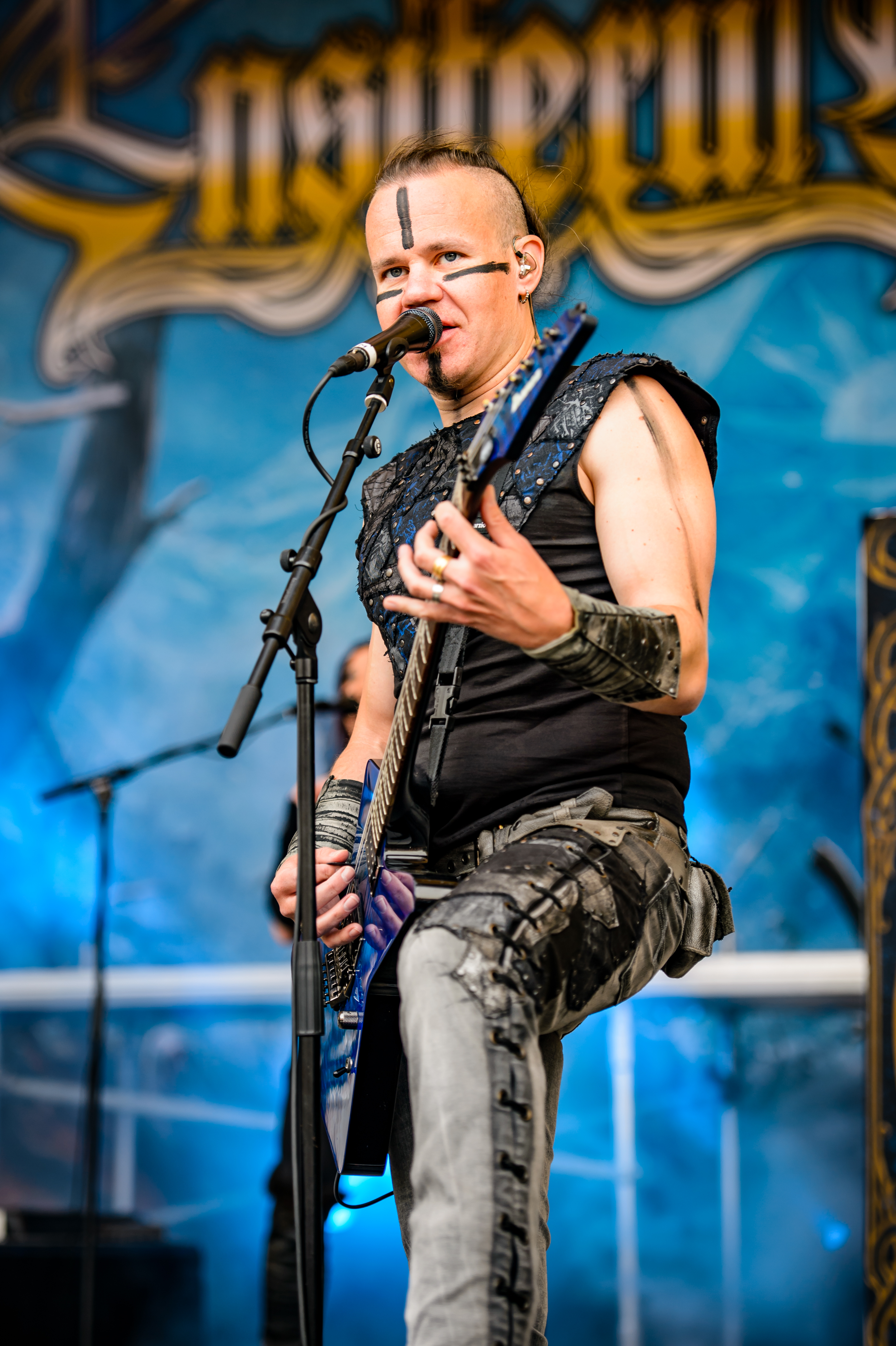
- Toivonen performing in 2016

Background information
- Born: 15 November 1979 (age 46); Helsinki, Finland
- Genres: Folk metal, Viking metal, melodic death metal, power metal
- Occupations: Musician, songwriter
- Instruments: Guitar, vocals
- Years active: 1995–present
- Member of: Ensiferum, Speden Timantit
- Formerly of: Soulstream
- Website: ensiferum.com

Markus Toivonen (born 1979) is a Finnish guitarist, vocalist, songwriter, and a founding member of the folk metal band Ensiferum. He founded the band in 1995 and is the sole original member left. His role in the band is guitarist and primary songwriter. He has always contributed backing vocals and since the departure of Jari Mäenpää in 2004 has taken up a greater role behind the microphone, sharing the clean vocal parts with bass player Sami Hinkka, with Mäenpää's replacement Petri Lindroos handling the harsh vocals.

Toivonen also plays in a side band called Speden Timantit and has been a member of the short-lived black/death metal outfit Soulstream.
