= Don't Fall Asleep (Horror Pt. 2) =

Single by Swallow The Sun

from the album Hope
- Released: 10 January 2007
- Recorded: September–October 2006 at Seawolf Studios, Finland
- Genre: Death-doom, doom metal, progressive metal
- Length: 4:56
- Label: Spinefarm Records
- Songwriters: Matti Honkonen, Markus Jämsen, Mikko Kotamäki, Aleksi Munter, Pasi Pasanen, Juha Raivio

Swallow The Sun singles chronology
"Forgive Her..." (2005)	"Don't Fall Asleep (Horror Pt. 2)" (2007)	"New Moon" (2009)

"Don't Fall Asleep (Horror Pt. 2)" is a CD single by Swallow the Sun, released in 2007 by Spinefarm Records.

This song continues in the "Horror" series with Pt. I being "Swallow" previously from Out of This Gloomy Light, Plague of Butterflies or The Morning Never Came, Pt. III being "Lights on the Lake" later on from New Moon & Pt. IV being "Labyrinth of London" later on from Emerald Forest and the Blackbird. This is the only song out of the series not to be written in Roman numeral.

"These Low Lands" is a cover version and original song is done by Timo Rautiainen & Trio Niskalaukaus, from their album Lopunajan merkit. The song is actually called Alavilla mailla, but Swallow the Sun translated the song into English.

== Track listing ==
No.	Title	Length
1.	"Don't Fall Asleep (Horror Pt. 2) (edit)"	4:56
2.	"These Low Lands"	5:54
3.	"Don't Fall Asleep (Horror Pt. 2)"	7:41

== Chart positions ==
Year	Chart	Peak
2006	Finnish Single Chart	3

== Credits ==
=== Swallow the Sun ===
- Mikko Kotamäki - vocals
- Markus Jämsen - guitar
- Juha Raivio - guitar, songwriting (1 & 3)
- Aleksi Munter - keyboards, engineering, recording
- Matti Honkonen - bass
- Pasi Pasanen - drums

=== Additional personnel ===
- Tinuviel - backing vocals (1 & 3)
- Jaani Peuhu - backing vocals (1 & 3)
- Tomi Joutsen - clean vocals (2)
- Tomi Tuomaala - lyrics (2)

=== Production ===
- Sami Kokko - engineering, mixing, producer, recording
- Hannu Honkonen - engineering, recording (keyboards)
- Minerva Pappi - mastering
- Viara Gentchev - logo
