= When a Shadow Is Forced into the Light =

Studio album by Swallow the Sun
- Released: January 25, 2019
- Genre: Death-doom, doom metal, gothic metal, post-metal
- Length: 52:26
- Label: Century Media
- Producer: Jaani Peuhu, Juha Raivio

Swallow the Sun chronology
| Songs from the North I, II & III (2015) | When a Shadow Is Forced into the Light (2019) | Moonflowers (2021) |

Singles from When a Shadow Is Forced into the Light
- 1. "Upon the Water" Released: January 7, 2019; 2. "Firelights" Released: January 18, 2019

When a Shadow Is Forced into the Light is the seventh studio album by Finnish death-doom band Swallow the Sun. It was released on January 25, 2019, by Century Media. The album deals directly with the death of Juha Raivio's partner, the singer Aleah Stanbridge. It is their shortest studio album release to date, and also the first to have a much more prominent emphasis on clean vocals.

== Background and composition ==
In an interview with Decibel, speaking on how Stanbridge's death influenced the music for When a Shadow is Forced into the Light, Juha Raivio said: "Every word and note I wrote, I wrote for Aleah on this album and about my own battle [...]. This album name comes from the words of Aleah, 'When a shadow is forced into the light', and that was exactly what I needed to do. To push myself out from the shadows, as I had been pretty much a hermit in the woods for two and a half years, I had to push this album out."

The album has been noted for showcasing a more melodic and atmospheric sound, as well as a bigger emphasis on Mikko Kotamäki's clean vocals. AllMusic described the album's style as primarily post-metal, with gothic rock, black metal and doom metal influences.

== Critical reception ==
Professional ratings
Review scores
| Source | Rating |
|---|---|
| AllMusic | 4/5 stars |
| Laut.de | 4/5 stars |
| Metal.de | 8/10 |
| Metal Hammer | 4.5/5 stars |
| Rock Hard | 8.0/10 |

When a Shadow Is Forced into the Light received critical acclaim.

AllMusic gave the album a positive review, saying that the album's songs are "more melodic than anything" in the band's catalog. They added that "When a Shadow is Forced into the Light is an album one cannot fully appreciate in one listen", and concluded that "its many degrees of melancholy and sadness are not expressed for their own sake, but as the underside of the ravaged beauty that can only emerge in the wake of unspeakable loss and evolve as transcendence".

Metal Hammer awarded the album four and a half out of five stars, noting the emotional weight and the "many layers of musical sorrow" in the album's sound. They praised Juha Raivio's guitar playing in particular, and asserted that "the rawness and realness of the pain behind this album leaves their previous work sounding breezily untroubled in comparison".

== Track listing ==
All music is composed by Juha Raivio, except where noted.

| No. | Title | Music | Length |
|---|---|---|---|
| 1. | "When a Shadow Is Forced into the Light" | | 7:26 |
| 2. | "The Crimson Crown" | | 7:56 |
| 3. | "Firelights" | | 5:40 |
| 4. | "Upon the Water" | | 6:16 |
| 5. | "Stone Wings" | | 6:55 |
| 6. | "Clouds on Your Side" | Raivio, Mikko Kotamäki, Aleah Stanbridge | 4:46 |
| 7. | "Here on the Black Earth" | | 5:38 |
| 8. | "Never Left" | | 7:49 |
| Total length: | | | 52:26 |

== Personnel ==
- Mikko Kotamäki – lead vocals
- Juho Räihä – rhythm guitar
- Juha Raivio – lead guitar, keyboards
- Jaani Peuhu – keyboards, vocal
- Matti Honkonen – bass guitar
- Juuso Raatikainen – drums

== Charts ==
| Chart (2019) | Peak position |
|---|---|
| Austrian Albums (Ö3 Austria) | 63 |
| Belgian Albums (Ultratop Flanders) | 195 |
| Belgian Albums (Ultratop Wallonia) | 159 |
| Finnish Albums (Suomen virallinen lista) | 1 |
| German Albums (Offizielle Top 100) | 33 |
| Swiss Albums (Schweizer Hitparade) | 38 |
