= Hope (Swallow the Sun album) =

Studio album by Swallow the Sun
- Released: 2007
- Recorded: September–October 2006
- Genre: Death-doom, melodic death metal
- Length: 63:37
- Label: Spinefarm

Swallow the Sun chronology
Ghosts of Loss (2005)	Hope (2007)	Plague of Butterflies (2008)

Professional ratings
Review scores
Source	Rating
Terrorizer	(Nov 2008)

Hope is the third studio album by Finnish death-doom band Swallow the Sun. It was released in 2007.

The Horror tetralogy continues from this album, first being on The Morning Never Came, then New Moon, & finally on Emerald Forest and the Blackbird.

The Limited Edition version includes "These Low lands" a Timo Rautiainen & Trio Niskalaukaus cover that is originally named "Alavilla mailla", Swallow the Sun translated the song into English for this version.

== Track listing ==
No.	Title	Length
1.	"Hope"	7:53
2.	"These Hours of Despair"	5:58
3.	"The Justice of Suffering"	6:26
4.	"Don't Fall Asleep (Horror Pt. 2)"	7:41
5.	"Too Cold for Tears"	9:16
6.	"The Empty Skies"	7:17
7.	"No Light, No Hope"	4.42
8.	"Doomed to Walk the Earth"	9:00
Total length:		57:43

Limited Edition Bonus Track
No.	Title	Note	Length
9.	"These Low Lands"	Timo Rautiainen & Trio Niskalaukaus cover	5:54
Total length:			63:37

== Credits ==
=== Swallow the Sun ===
- Mikko Kotamäki - lead vocals
- Markus Jämsen - lead guitar
- Juha Raivio - rhythm guitar; songwriting (1–8)
- Matti Honkonen - bass guitar
- Aleksi Munter - keyboards; keyboard recording, engineering
- Pasi Pasanen - drums

=== Production staff ===
- Sami Kokko - engineering, mixing, production, recording (vocals, guitars & drums)
- Hannu Honkonen - engineering, co-keyboards recording
- Minerva Pappi - mastering

=== Songwriters (9) ===
- Timo Rautiainen & Trio Niskalaukaus

=== Guest vocalists ===
==== Co-vocalists ====
- Jonas Renkse - (3)
- Tomi Joutsen - (9)

==== Backing vocalists ====
- Tinuviel - (2, 4, 8)
- Jaani Peuhu - (4)

=== Album inlay designers ===
- Tero Salonen - art direction
- Viara Gentchev - logo
- Sean Elliot - cover art
- Jarmo Katila - band photography

== Chart positions ==
Year	Chart	Peak
2007	Finnish Top 40 Album Chart	3
