= Grind Finale =

Compilation album by Nasum
- Released: 25 October 2005
- Recorded: July 1993 – July 2004
- Genre: Grindcore
- Length: 126:20
- Label: Relapse
- Producer: Nasum

Nasum chronology
Shift (2004)	Grind Finale (2005)	Doombringer (2008)

Professional ratings
Review scores
Source	Rating
AllMusic	4/5 stars
Collector's Guide to Heavy Metal	10/10
Stylus	A

Grind Finale is a two-CD compilation album by Swedish grindcore band Nasum. It covers the band's entire career, with songs from all the 15 studio recordings between 1993 and 2004, including 21 previously unreleased songs.

The original title for the compilation was Blueprint for Extinction, but after the death of Nasum frontman Mieszko Talarczyk, the remaining band members felt that the word "extinction" made the title inappropriate. The band started to think of a play on words with "Grind" somewhere in the title, and ended up with "Grind Finale" since it would be the final major release from Nasum.

The lyrics of the song "Erased" are almost entirely derived from a frequently quoted passage in Pierre-Joseph Proudhon's The General Idea of the Revolution in the Nineteenth Century.

== Track listing ==
=== Disc one ===
1. Blind World – 1:18
2. Think – 1:20
3. Scarecrows – 1:36
4. No Time to Waste – 0:42
5. Total Destruction – 0:27
6. Between the Walls – 1:50
7. Left in a Dream – 0:24
8. Uneventful Occupation – 0:58
9. Reasons? – 0:18
10. Disforest – 0:10
11. Self Vilification – 0:35
12. Red Tape Suckers – 0:04
13. Re-create the System – 0:27
14. Rens – 0:04
15. Hurt – 0:24
16. Corpse Flesh Genitals – 0:58
17. Sawder – 0:47
18. A Look at Society – 0:44
19. Fucking Murder! – 0:43
20. Black Visions (Scarecrows II) – 1:00
21. Escape – 0:17
22. See the Shit (With Your Own Eyes) – 0:47
23. Restrained from the Truth – 0:31
24. No Chance – 0:57
25. My Fear – 0:37
26. Fur – 1:02
27. A Game Played by Society – 0:28
28. It's All About the Information – 0:20
29. Smile When You're Dead – 0:32
30. Blindfolded (By the Media) – 0:22
31. Erased – 0:20
32. Warfuck – 0:12
33. No Chance (Extended Noise-remix Version) – 1:51
34. Cut to Fit – 0:44
35. Forced Opinion – 0:37
36. Domedagen – 0:43
37. Left in a Dream – 0:23
38. Distortion & Disinformation – 1:23
39. Stalemate (Napalm Death cover) – 0:58
40. Bag – 0:46
41. Revolution – 0:37
42. What's "Life"? – 0:35
43. Think – 1:12
44. Verklighetsflykt – 0:19
45. Face Obliteration – 0:58
46. Enough! – 1:03
47. Dom Styr Vara Liv (Mob 47 cover) – 1:01
48. Industrislaven – 0:25
49. Löpandebandsprincipen – 0:28
50. Cut to Fit – 0:45
51. Fantasibilder – 0:52
52. Distortion & Disinformation – 1:24
53. Brinn – 0:51
54. Krigets Skörd – 1:09
55. Mer Rens – 0:17
56. Ditt Öde – 0:26
57. Ingenting Att Ha! – 0:17
58. Revolution – 0:35
59. Den Mörka Tiden – 0:39
60. Forcefed Opinion – 0:37
61. Domedagen – 0:37
62. Dolt Under Ytan – 0:22
63. I Helvetet – 0:33
64. Skithus – 0:37
65. Söndermald – 1:35
66. Revolution II – 0:37
67. World in Turmoil – 0:13
68. The Final Confrontation (Scarecrows III) – 0:44
69. The Dream – 0:54
70. Zombie Society – 0:33
71. Sheer Horror – 0:50
72. Awake – 0:25
73. En Värld Utan Hopp – 0:35
74. End – 0:18
75. As Time Goes By... – 0:22
76. Our Revolution – 0:50
77. Masquerade – 0:26
78. Ripped – 0:48
79. Rage – 0:19
80. Law & Order? – 0:30
81. Rise – 0:44
82. Killed By Your Greed – 0:42
83. Silent Sanguinary Soil – 1:48
84. Evacuate the Earth – 1:04
85. The Black Illusions – 0:11
86. Disgrace – 0:47
87. No Paradise for the Damned – 0:32
88. A Change in Your Mind – 0:26
89. Dreamland – 1:00
90. Last – 0:42

=== Disc two ===
1. Dis Sucks – 0:38
2. The Leak – 0:19
3. Eviscerated (By the Fiend) – 0:58
4. Shambler – 0:26
5. Lack of Ammunition – 0:23
6. The Machines – 0:27
7. Låt Inte Asen Styra Ditt Liv – 0:56
8. Going Nowhere – 0:55
9. Generation Ex – 0:26
10. The Soil Bleeds Black – 0:42
11. Hail the Chaos! – 1:00
12. Fuck the System – 0:31
13. The Spiral Goes Down – 1:00
14. Shortcut to Extinction – 0:20
15. Vows – 0:31
16. Hate Division – 0:59
17. Visions of War (Discharge cover) – 0:59
18. Bullshit Tradition (Dropdead cover) – 0:29
19. Device (S.O.B. cover) – 1:36
20. The Real (Refused cover) – 2:18
21. Rio de San Atlanta, Manitoba (Propagandhi cover) – 0:33
22. ...And You Were Blind to What Lay Beyond the Horizon – 0:45
23. Stolen Pride – 0:55
24. Silent – 1:07
25. Losing Faith – 0:35
26. I Decline! – 0:25
27. Naive Ignorant Fucks! – 0:11
28. Obstacle – 0:20
29. The Political Structure is not What it Seems in the So Called Lucid View that Man has Upon Today's Society. What the Eye Sees is a Lie. – 0:11
30. A Bloodbath Displayed – 0:46
31. God-slave America – 1:34
32. Supernova – 0:52
33. Shafted – 0:35
34. S.O.C.I.E.T.Y. (Home of the Dead) – 0:28
35. Tools of the Trade (Carcass cover) – 2:58
36. Fear – 1:09
37. Krossa – 1:21
38. In Praise of Folly – 1:27
39. Peace? – 0:54
40. Falska tankar – 1:22
41. Godmorgon, Idiotjävel – 1:16
42. Understand: You are Deluded – 1:06
43. Fear of the China Syndrome – 1:21
44. Suicide – 0:58
45. X Marks the Spot – 2:14
46. The Flames of the Truth – 2:07
47. Sticks and Stones – 0:36
48. Dead Mirror – 1:22
49. Helvete – 1:00
50. A Civil Critique – 1:58
51. Damned Nation – 0:58
52. A Dead Generation – 1:07
53. Divine Intervention – 0:47
54. Fury – 2:26
55. The Unfathomable Situation – 2:19
56. Unchallenged Hate (Napalm Death cover) – 2:03
57. DLTD – 0:38
58. Gravar – 0:25
59. Ingenting – 0:55
60. Until the Board Breaks – 1:31
61. Downwards – 0:53
62. Stealth Politics – 0:46
