= Songs from the North I, II & III =

Studio album by Swallow the Sun
- Released: 13 November 2015
- Studio: Sound Supreme; Electric Fox Studio; Noisework Studio; Black Chandelier; Ahonlaita; MANA REC; Stereotunes
- Genre: Death metal; doom metal; funeral doom
- Length: 153:39
- Label: Century Media

Swallow the Sun chronology
Emerald Forest and the Blackbird (2012)	Songs from the North I, II & III (2015)	When a Shadow Is Forced into the Light (2019)

Songs from the North I, II & III is the sixth studio album by Finnish death-doom band Swallow the Sun. It is a triple album and was released on 13 November 2015, via Century Media. Each disc is focused on a different facet of the band's style: Gloom is a more typical death-doom album, Beauty primarily acoustic and folksy, and Despair a funeral doom album; these disc titles are also a single song title on their second album, Ghosts of Loss. This is the last release with Aleksi Munter and Markus Jämsen, who quit Swallow the Sun in 2016 and 2018 respectively. Songs from the North I, II & III received a generally positive reception from critics.

== Track listing ==
Disc One: Gloom
No.	Title	Length
1.	"With You Came the Whole of the World's Tears"	9:01
2.	"10 Silver Bullets"	7:11
3.	"Rooms and Shadows"	7:19
4.	"Heartstrings Shattering"	7:46
5.	"Silhouettes"	5:55
6.	"The Memory of Light"	6:17
7.	"Lost & Catatonic"	7:06
8.	"From Happiness to Dust"	8:39
Total length:		59:15

Disc Two: Beauty
No.	Title	Length
1.	"The Womb of Winter" (Instrumental)	3:35
2.	"The Heart of a Cold White Land"	4:47
3.	"Away"	5:22
4.	"Pray for the Winds to Come"	5:28
5.	"Songs from the North"	5:16
6.	"66°50'N, 28°40'E" (Instrumental)	6:42
7.	"Autumn Fire"	5:46
8.	"Before the Summer Dies"	5:37
Total length:		42:33

Disc Three: Despair
No.	Title	Length
1.	"The Gathering of Black Moths"	12:57
2.	"7 Hours Late"	10:02
3.	"Empires of Loneliness"	11:01
4.	"Abandoned by the Light"	8:48
5.	"The Clouds Prepare for Battle"	9:05
Total length:		51:57

== Reception ==
Professional ratings
Aggregate scores
Source	Rating
Metacritic	78/100
Review scores
Source	Rating
About.com	3.5/5 stars
AllMusic	4.5/5 stars
PopMatters	6/10 stars
Sputnikmusic	3.0/5

== Credits ==
=== Swallow the Sun ===
- Mikko Kotamäki – lead vocals
- Markus Jämsen – lead guitar
- Juha Raivio – rhythm guitar; all songwriting, guitar recording, mixing (I Gloom)
- Matti Honkonen – bass guitar
- Aleksi Munter – keyboards; recording, art direction, layout, photography
- Juuso Raatikainen – drums

=== Additional vocalists ===
- Aleah Stanbridge – co-vocals ("Heartstrings Shattering") also cover art and photography
- Sarah Elisabeth Wohlfahrt – backing vocals ("The Memory of Light" and "Lost & Catatonic")
- Kaisa Vala – co-vocals ("Songs from the North")
- Nathan Ellis – narration ("Empires of Loneliness")

=== Recording staff ===
- Tuomas Kokko – also mixing (II Beauty)
- Hiili Hiilesmaa – also mixing (III Despair)
- Hannu Honkonen – recording assistance

=== Band photography ===
- Alexandra Lisiecki
- Antti Makkonen
- Jussi Ratilainen
- Indrek Päri

=== Vocal recording ===
- Kaisa Vala
- Pietari Pyykönen
- Birger Nießen – recording of Sarah Elisabeth Wohlfahrt's Vocals

=== Mastering staff ===
- Patrick W. Engel – vinyl mastering
- Svante Forsbäck – CD mastering

=== Additional personnel ===
- Jaani Peuhu – vocal production, mixing (II Beauty) and backing vocals
- Rami Mursula – artwork and logo
