= Genocide Superstars =

Genocide Superstars (often referred to as or shortened to Genocide SS) was a Swedish hardcore punk, rock n' roll band. The band was formed in 1994 in Örebro, Sweden. The lyrics, themes and surrounding artwork tended to revolve around subjects such as violence, totalitarianism, alcohol use, women and motorcycles.

Guitarist/vocalist Mieszko Talarczyk was one of the victims of the 2004 tsunami, and the band announced on their Myspace page that they had disbanded, as had Talarczyk's other band, Nasum. There is to date no plans whatsoever for the rest of the band to play and record together again, at least not under the name Genocide SS.

== Members ==
- Danny Violence – guitar/vocals
- Mierre Mongo – guitar/vocals (1994–2004; his death)
- Richard A.D. – bass/vocals
- Matt von Superstar – drums/backing vocals

== Discography ==
- Genocide Superstars / Vivisection split album (1996)
- Hail The New Storm (1997)
- Another Fucking EP (1997)
- We Are Born of Hate (1999)
- Genocide Superstars EP (2002)
- Iron Cross (2002)
- We Are Born Of Hate (2002, reissue)
- Superstar Destroyer (2003)
- Hail the New Storm (2004, reissue)
