= Murderworks =

Studio album by Rotten Sound
- Released: 4 June 2002
- Recorded: December 2001 – March 2002
- Genre: Grindcore
- Length: 28:33
- Label: Deathvomit
- Producer: Mieszko Talarczyk

Rotten Sound chronology
Drain (1999)	Murderworks (2002)	Exit (2005)

Murderworks is the third studio album by the Finnish grindcore band Rotten Sound. The album was recorded at Soundlab studios with production by Mieszko Talarczyk.

== Release ==
Murderworks was released in June 2002 through Deathvomit Records (a subsidiary of Necropolis Records) in the United States, and Century Media in Europe, where the album's artwork was censored by manufacturers in Germany, who considered the original cover and band photos too disturbing for German consumers. As a replacement, the cover was re-colored in shades of red and white, with a note on top saying, "Check booklet for original artwork."

The album also includes two live videos for "Seeds" and "Strongman," and the "Targets" music video, which later appeared on the Murderlive DVD, released in 2004. Murderworks was reissued by Relapse Records in 2005, and regarding this re-release, critics have different opinions. While a review in the Exclaim! magazine defined this reissue of Murderworks as "essential to the grind[core] fan," Kevin Stewart-Panko from Decibel quoted it with a question, which says: "The easiest reissue job ever?" He also noted that "the actual recording doesn't appear to have been remastered" and concluded his review stating, "Maybe the advantage with Relapse reissuing this is that, this time, it’ll actually get released."

== Critical reception ==
Professional ratings
Review scores
Source	Rating
AllMusic	3/5 stars
Chronicles of Chaos	6/10
Exclaim!	(favorable)

AllMusic writer Alex Henderson, stated that "from start to finish, Murderworks is an exercise in sensory assault for the sake of sensory assault." Henderson defined the band's tempo as "insanely fast", and criticized their "one-dimensional" musical style, comparing with Rotten Sound's previous releases, saying:

After you have heard the opening number, "Targets," you've pretty much heard it all; headbangers who like their metal albums with a lot of variety won't find it here. But despite the CD's obvious limitations, Murderworks is, in its own way, exhilarating—that is, if you have a taste for this type of extreme metal.

Evaluating all aspects of Murderworks, Chronicles of Chaos reviewer Aaron McKay gave the album six out of ten stars, saying, "Fourteen tracks of single-word titles rip unforgivingly and in a way such that enjoyment can be easily gained from every cut to some degree." He also stated, "Anger, violence and aggression are, of course, the staples on which Murderworks fuels its insatiable appetite." Exclaim! writer Greg Pratt praised the album stating, "Not since Nasum's last album has there been a grindcore onslaught as relentless and energetic as Rotten Sound's Murderworks." Pratt also praised the "crushing production" of Mieszko Talarczyk "that is as heavy as it is clear."

== Track listing ==
No.	Title	Length
1.	"Targets"	1:58
2.	"Void"	0:44
3.	"Revenge"	1:49
4.	"Lies"	1:08
5.	"Doom"	1:47
6.	"IQ"	3:17
7.	"Insects"	0:28
8.	"Seeds"	2:20
9.	"Suffer"	0:11
10.	"Obey"	3:15
11.	"Edge"	1:39
12.	"Lobotomy"	2:41
13.	"Insane"	2:02
14.	"Agony"	5:06

== Personnel ==
- Mika Häkki – bass
- Kai Hahto – drums
- Mika Aalto – guitar
- Mieszko Talarczyk – guitar (track 10), producer, engineer, editing, mixing, sounds, high tenor vocal (track 14)
- Keijo Niinimaa – vocals
- Mika Jussila – mastering
- Rotten Sound – arranger, production accountant
