= Swallow the Sun =

Finnish death-doom band

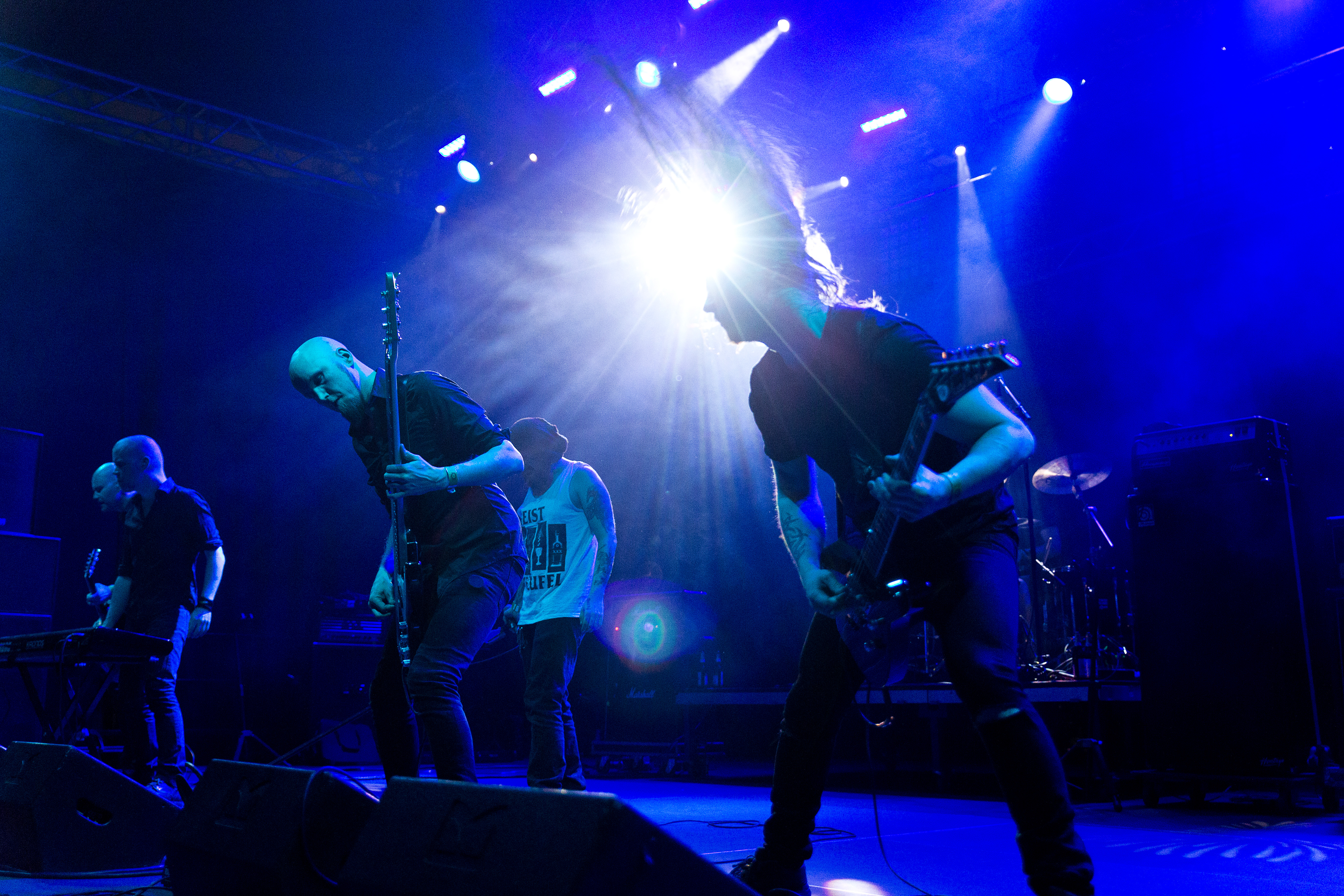
- Swallow the Sun at Wave-Gotik-Treffen in 2016

Background information
- Origin: Jyväskylä, Finland
- Genres: Death-doom, melodic death metal
- Years active: 2000–present
- Labels: Firebox, Spinefarm, Svart, Century Media
- Members: Juha Raivio; Mikko Kotamäki; Matti Honkonen; Juuso Raatikainen; Juho Räihä
- Past members: Pasi Pasanen; Kai Hahto; Aleksi Munter; Markus Jämsen; Jaani Peuhu
- Website: Swallowthesun.net

Swallow the Sun is a Finnish death-doom band founded in 2000 by Juha Raivio. The band currently consists of guitarist and founder Juha Raivio, vocalist Mikko Kotamäki, drummer Juuso Raatikainen, guitarist Juho Räihä, and bassist Matti Honkonen. Their death-doom style emphasizes melody and atmosphere, and occasionally steps into gothic and black metal territory. They have released nine studio albums, one triple album, one EP, one demo, one live album and seven singles as of 2026.

The band name originates from the long winter seasons of Finland where the Sun would be blocked for months. Its name also references Nordic myths about creatures swallowing the Sun from the sky, usually signifying the end of the world.

== History ==
=== Formation and The Morning Never Came (2000–2004) ===
Swallow the Sun was formed in early 2000 by Juha Raivio, soon joined by Pasi Pasanen (both had played together in Plutonium Orange). They rehearsed a couple of songs, one of them being "Through Her Silvery Body" which would end up on their first demo, Out of This Gloomy Light. In 2001, Markus Jämsen, whom Raivio and Pasanen already knew from their earlier bands, joined as a second guitarist, and Mikko Kotamäki from Funeris Nocturnum as singer; then Aleksi Munter (keyboards) and Matti Honkonen (bass), also of Funeris Nocturnum, joined the band. In the spring of 2002 they started arranging songs for the demo Out of This Gloomy Light which was recorded in January 2003 at Sam's Workshop with Sami Kokko, who also mixed the demo.

A record deal with Firebox Records was signed a few months after the recordings of the demo, and Swallow the Sun entered studio at late July 2003. During the following three weeks they recorded their debut album, The Morning Never Came.

=== Ghosts of Loss (2005–2006) ===
In February 2005, Swallow the Sun released their second album, Ghosts of Loss. Their single, "Forgive Her...," gained fourth place on the Finnish Top 20 singles chart in its first week of release, and stayed on the charts for six weeks. Their album entered the charts as well: No. 8 in between Gwen Stefani and System of a Down. Some of the album's songs have connections to the TV show Twin Peaks.

=== Hope and Plague of Butterflies (2007–2008) ===
During the year 2006, they signed to Spinefarm Records and did a small European tour. In January 2007 they released their third album, Hope, which includes a cover version of the Timo Rautiainen & Trio Niskalaukaus song "Alavilla mailla" (which they translated into "These Low Lands") as a bonus track on the digipack edition, sung by Tomi Joutsen, the frontman of fellow Finnish metal band, Amorphis. There is also a guest appearance by Jonas Renkse of Katatonia on the song "The Justice of Suffering." They went on a US tour with Katatonia, Scar Symmetry and Insomnium in late 2007.

In September 2008, they released an EP called Plague of Butterflies, followed by a December tour of the UK of ten live shows supporting Apocalyptica.

=== New Moon (2009–2011) ===
On 18 May 2009 Kai Hahto of Wintersun joined Swallow the Sun to fill the void left by former drummer Pasi Pasanen. Kai Hahto did the drums on their next album, entitled New Moon, Produced by Jens Bogren, the album was released on 10 November 2009.

=== Emerald Forest and the Blackbird (2012–2014) ===
The fifth studio album Emerald Forest and the Blackbird was released on 1 February 2012 via Spinefarm Records. The lead single for the album, "Cathedral Walls", featured vocals by former Nightwish singer Anette Olzon. The song "Labyrinth of London" features guest vocals by Raivio's partner Aleah Stanbridge.

=== Century Media and Songs from the North I, II & III (2015–2018) ===
Around June of 2015, Swallow the Sun signs with record label Century Media. The band released the triple album Songs from the North I, II & III on 13 November 2015. Each of the three album discs embodies a different facet of the band's style: Gloom, Beauty, and Despair. Juuso Raatikainen replaced Kai Hahto as full-time drummer on this album, as Hahto was working on Nightwish's 2015 album Endless Forms Most Beautiful and subsequent tour in place of Jukka Nevalainen. However, Hahto has not been kicked out or resigned.

Swallow the Sun's only non-album single was released on 21 December 2018, titled "Lumina Aurea", featuring Wardruna's Einar Selvik and The Foreshadowing's Marco I. Benevento. The track embodies Raivio's bereavement and other emotions he experienced after the death of his partner Aleah Stanbridge in 2016. It contains the title track and additionally an instrumental version of the track.

=== When a Shadow Is Forced into the Light (2019–2020) ===
In November 2018, the band announced their seventh album, When a Shadow Is Forced into the Light, and its track list on their official Facebook page. The album was released on 25 January 2019, through Century Media Records. It focuses on the death of Raivio's partner Aleah Stanbridge, Raivio's mourning, and his life since Stanbridge's death. The title of the album is a quote by Stanbridge, which was also a lyric in the song "Broken Mirror" by her and Raivio's band Trees of Eternity.

On 28 May 2021, the band announced their first live album. The occasion is the 20th anniversary of their debut album Gloom, Beauty and Despair. 20 Years of Gloom, Beauty and Despair – Live in Helsinki was released on April 20. The album was recorded live on 26 February 2020, at Tavastia Club, Helsinki on their 20th anniversary tour. The first eight tracks are an acoustic set that includes the entire second part of the Songs From The North album. The other songs were selected via a fan poll on social media asking fans for their favorite songs from the rest of the albums.

=== Moonflowers (2021–2023) ===
Swallow the Sun's eighth studio album, titled Moonflowers was released on 19 November 2021, featuring strings recorded by the string trio, Trio N O X. The band subsequently announced their North American and European tour promoting the album's release, followed by a Latin American tour in early 2023.

=== Shining (2024–present) ===
The band's ninth studio album, Shining, was released on 18 October 2024, through Century Media Records. The album was produced by Dan Lancaster.

== Band members ==
=== Current ===
- Mikko Kotamäki – lead vocals (2001–present)
- Juha Raivio – guitars (2001–present), keyboards (2018–present)
- Matti Honkonen – bass (2001–present)
- Juuso Raatikainen – drums (2013–present)
- Juho Räihä – guitars (2018–present)

=== Former ===
- Pasi Pasanen – drums (2001–2009)
- Markus Jämsen – guitars (2001–2018)
- Aleksi Munter – keyboards (2001–2016)
- Kai Hahto – drums (2009–2013)
- Jaani Peuhu – keyboards (2018–2021)

== Discography ==
=== Studio albums ===
Title	Details	Peak chart positions		
Title	Details	FIN	GER	US Heat
The Morning Never Came	Released: 15 November 2003; Label: Firebox; Formats: CD, LP, download	—	—	—
Ghosts of Loss	Released: 24 August 2005; Label: Firebox; Formats: CD, LP, download	8	—	—
Hope	Released: 7 February 2007; Label: Spinefarm; Formats: CD, LP, download	3	—	—
New Moon	Released: 10 November 2009; Label: Spinefarm, Svart; Formats: CD, LP, download	10	—	—
Emerald Forest and the Blackbird	Released: 1 February 2012; Label: Spinefarm, Svart; Formats: CD, LP, download	2	—	—
Songs from the North I, II & III	Released: 13 November 2015; Label: Century Media; Formats: CD, LP, download	7	52	20
When a Shadow Is Forced into the Light	Released: 25 January 2019; Label: Century Media; Formats: CD, LP, download	1	33	12
Moonflowers	Released: 19 November 2021; Label: Century Media; Formats: CD, LP, download	2	58	—
Shining	Released: 18 October 2024; Label: Century Media; Formats: CD, LP, download	5	95	—

=== EPs ===
Title	Details	Peak chart positions
Title	Details	FIN
Plague of Butterflies	Released: 17 September 2008; Label: Spinefarm; Formats: CD, LP, download	1

=== Live albums ===
Title	Details	Peak chart positions
Title	Details	FIN
20 Years of Gloom, Beauty and Despair - Live in Helsinki	Released: 30 July 2021; Label: Spinefarm; Formats: CD, DVD, LP, download	-

=== Singles ===
List of singles, with selected chart positions, showing release year and album name
Title	Year	Peak chart positions	Album
Title	Year	FIN	Album
"Forgive Her..."	2005	24	Ghosts of Loss
"Don't Fall Asleep (Horror Pt. 2)"	2007	16	Hope
"New Moon"	2009	—	New Moon
"Silent Towers"	2012	—	Emerald Forest and the Blackbird
"Lumina Aurea"	2018	—	Non-album single
"Woven into Sorrow"	2021	—	Moonflowers
"Enemy"	2021	—	Moonflowers

=== Music videos ===
- "Descending Winters" (2005)
- "Don't Fall Asleep" (2007)
- "Doomed to Walk the Earth" (2007)
- "Falling World" (2009)
- "Cathedral Walls" (2012)
- "Rooms and Shadows" (2015)
- "Lumina Aurea" (2018)
- "Firelights" (2019)
- "Woven into Sorrow" (2021)
- "Enemy" (2021)
- "The Void" (2021)
- "This House Has No Home" (2021)
- "Innocence Was Long Forgotten" (2024)

=== Demos ===
- Out of This Gloomy Light (2003)
