= Exit (Rotten Sound album) =

Studio album by Rotten Sound
- Released: 5 January 2005
- Genre: Grindcore
- Length: 28:25
- Label: Spinefarm, Willowtip
- Producer: Mieszko Talarczyk

Rotten Sound chronology
Murderworks (2002)	Exit (2005)	Cycles (2008)

Professional ratings
Review scores
Source	Rating
Metal.de	

Exit is the fourth studio album by Finnish grindcore band Rotten Sound, released on 5 January 2005.

== Track listing ==
No.	Title	Length
1.	"Exit"	1:05
2.	"Burden"	1:45
3.	"Sell Your Soul"	1:23
4.	"V.S.A."	2:10
5.	"Follow"	1:37
6.	"Maggots"	0:34
7.	"Slave"	1:34
8.	"Mass Suicide"	1:54
9.	"Soil"	1:31
10.	"Fail to Fall"	0:42
11.	"Greed"	0:48
12.	"Slay"	0:51
13.	"Western Cancer"	1:22
14.	"Nation"	1:48
15.	"Havoc"	1:39
16.	"Traitor"	1:13
17.	"XXI"	1:35
18.	"The Weak"	4:54
Total length:		28:25

LP bonus tracks
No.	Title	Length
19.	"Homicide"	0:30
20.	"Oppression"	0:28

== Personnel ==
- Keijo Niinimaa – vocals
- Mika Aalto – guitars
- Toni Pihlaja – bass
- Kai Hahto – drums

=== Additional personnel ===
- Mieszko Talarczyk – production, recording, mixing, mastering
- Håkan Åkesson – mastering

== Charts ==
Chart performance for Exit
Chart (2005)	Peak position
Finnish Albums (Suomen virallinen lista)	22

== Release history ==
Region	Date	Label	Format	Catalog
Europe	5 January 2005	Spinefarm Records	CD	SPI214CD
United States	15 February 2005	Willowtip Records	CD, LP	WT-034
