= Trees of Eternity =

Swedish metal band, 2009 to 2016

- Origin: Örebro, Sweden
- Genres: Gothic metal, doom metal
- Years active: 2009–2016
- Label: Svart Records
- Spinoff of: Swallow the Sun, Katatonia
- Past members: Aleah Stanbridge; Juha Raivio; Kai Hahto; Fredrik Norrman; Mattias Norrman
- Website: www.treesofeternity.com

Trees of Eternity was a Swedish metal band from Örebro that began in 2009 as a musical collaboration between Finnish guitarist Juha Raivio and South African-born Swedish singer Aleah Stanbridge.

Raivio, the guitarist of Swallow the Sun, first worked with Stanbridge on the band's 2009 album New Moon. The band finished recording a debut album in 2014 with two former Katatonia members and an ex-Swallow the Sun drummer. Stanbridge died of cancer in 2016 before the project could release the album, Hour of the Nightingale, which ultimately came out seven months later.

The band's music was described as gothic doom metal and death doom metal, featuring atmospheric, angelic female vocals.

== History ==
Swallow the Sun guitarist Juha Raivio was searching for a female vocalist to perform on the song "Lights on the Lake" from the band's fourth album New Moon. Raivio found a vocal demo posted by the South African-born Swedish vocalist Aleah Stanbridge. While recording together in Sweden, the duo formed Trees of Eternity as newfound romantic partners.

Rounding out the band's lineup, Raivio and Stanbridge recruited former Katatonia guitarist Fredrik Norrman (1996–2009) and his brother, former Katatonia bassist Mattias Norrman (1999–2009), as well as drummer Kai Hahto, formerly of Wintersun and Swallow the Sun. In 2012, the band signed with British publishing deal AMF Music, helmed by Andy Farrow, the manager for bands including Paradise Lost, Opeth and Devin Townsend. AMF Music was in charge of securing a record deal for the band.

The band finished recording the debut album Hour of the Nightingale in 2014 and had a label deal in the works. During the album's final post-production phase, Stanbridge died of cancer on 18 April 2016 at age 39. Raivio said that a week after Stanbridge's death, the record label informed him that they would no longer release the album. Ultimately, Svart Records stepped in to release the album, which featured guest vocal appearances from Nick Holmes of Paradise Lost and Mick Moss of Antimatter, and was produced by Jens Bogren.

On 11 August 2016, the album's lead single "Broken Mirror" was released. Hour of the Nightingale came out on 11 November 2016. Louder Sound compared the album to My Dying Bride, Tori Amos, The Gathering and Mazzy Star.

== Members ==
- Aleah Stanbridge – vocals (2009–2016; died 2016)
- Juha Raivio – guitars (2009–2016)
- Kai Hahto – drums (2013–2016)
- Fredrik Normann – guitars (2013–2016)
- Mattias Normann – bass (2014–2016)

== Discography ==
=== Studio albums ===
- Hour of The Nightingale (2016)

=== Demos ===
- Black Ocean (2013)
