= Kati Rán =

Dutch musician and historical instrumentalist

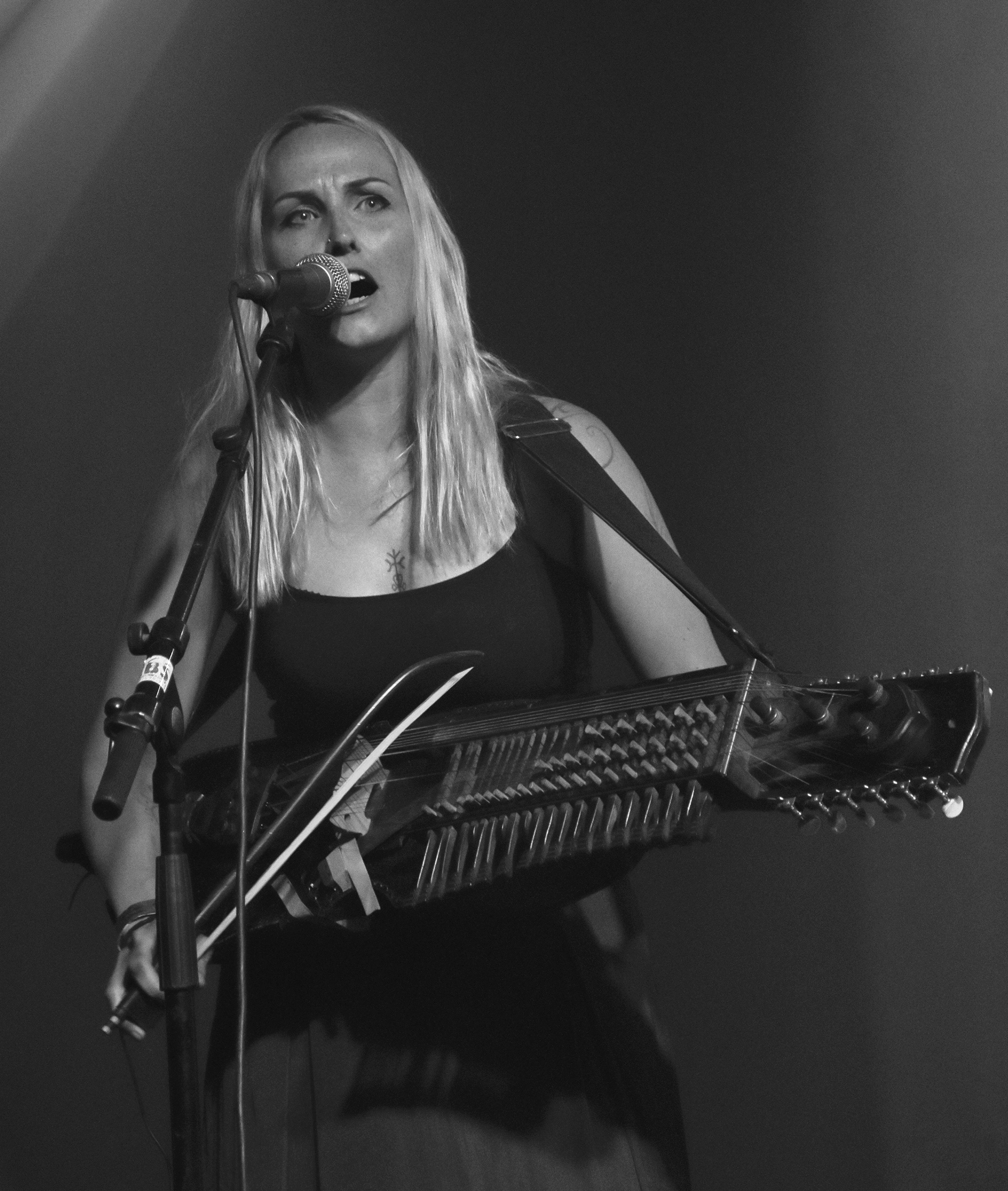
Kati Ran, performing in Gaahls Wyrd, Throne Fest 2017, Kuurne (Belgium)

Kati Rán is a Dutch musician and historical instrumentalist, her style being compared with Wardruna, Heilung, and Faun. She is a pioneer in the Nordic pagan folk sound combining historical instrumentation and Scandinavian and Old Norse Lyrics. Among other ethnic instruments she plays the Swedish nyckelharpa and moraharpa.

She released her first solo album LYS in 2015 under the bandname "L.E.A.F." which was produced and recorded by Christopher Juul of Heilung and Kati Rán, with guest musicians including Kai Uwe Faust and Maria Franz of Heilung and Oliver S. Tyr of Faun. It was sung in Norwegian, English, German, and Old Norse languages, and used historical folk instruments.

Her second album, the Dark Nordic (Neo)Folk SÁLA, was produced by Kati Rán and Jaani Peuhu. Two songs were produced by Christopher Juul of Heilung and Kati Rán together. For this album they made field recordings in Scandinavian countries, including the (re)discovery and recording of a rare lava stone marimba in Iceland made by Páll Guðmundsson for the album, which was released on Svart Records in 2024. It was inspired by feminine themes in Norse mythology and the Northern goddess Rán with song titles named after her nine mythological daughters. Guest musicians on SÁLA included Gaahl, Jaani Peuhu, Heilung and Mitch Harris and an Icelandic female choir.

Other activities have her as co-founder of the music project Folk Noir together with Oliver S. Tyr. The duo released the Ep "Songs from Home, Vol.1" in 2011. The project toured as a band in Europe until 2014 and a remaster of the original EP recording appears on Oliver S. Tyr's solo album."Munin" (2023).

Kati Rán provided historic and Nordic inspired voal performances and instrumental music in television, film and game soundtracks. Her credits include Vikings: Valhalla (2022) and the Viking film Redbad as a historic instruments musician, singer and vocalist.
