= Shining (Swallow the Sun album) =

Studio album by Swallow the Sun
- Released: 18 October 2024
- Genre: Doom metal, melodic death metal, death-doom
- Length: 49:26
- Label: Century Media
- Producer: Dan Lancaster

Swallow the Sun chronology
Moonflowers (2021)	Shining (2024)

Singles from Shining
- 1. "Innocence Was Long Forgotten" Released: 2 July 2024; 2. "What I Have Become" Released: 9 August 2024

Professional ratings
Review scores
Source	Rating
Chaoszine	3.5/5
Louder Sound	3.5/5
Metal Injection	8/10
MetalSucks	8/10

Shining is the ninth studio album by Finnish death-doom band Swallow the Sun. It was released on 18 October 2024 through Century Media Records and produced by Dan Lancaster, known for his production work with Bring Me the Horizon, Muse, and Enter Shikari.

The album shows the usual doomy sound of Swallow the Sun taking a more mainstream and progressive turn, with the band describing it as "their attempt at a 'Black Album' for the death-doom genre."

The band promoted the album with a North American tour in February and March 2025, supported by Harakiri for the Sky, Ghost Bath, and Snakes of Russia.

== Track listing ==
All music is composed by Juha Raivio.

No.	Title	Length
1.	"Innocence Was Long Forgotten"	4:19
2.	"What I Have Become"	4:06
3.	"MelancHoly"	3:39
4.	"Under the Moon & Sun"	6:10
5.	"Kold"	3:47
6.	"November Dust"	6:15
7.	"Velvet Chains"	3:17
8.	"Tonight Pain Believes"	4:13
9.	"Charcoal Sky"	4:49
10.	"Shining"	8:51
Total length:		49:26

== Personnel ==
Swallow the Sun

- Mikko Kotamäki – lead vocals
- Juho Räihä – rhythm guitar
- Juha Raivio – lead guitar, keyboards, backing vocals
- Matti Honkonen – bass guitar
- Juuso Raatikainen – drums

Guest musicians

- Rachel Wilkinson – backing vocals (tracks 4, 7)

Production and art

- Isa Koskelainen – cover model
- Jussi Ratilainen – photography
- Tommi Anttonen – artwork
- Rami Mursula – layout
- Tony Lindgren – mastering
- Juho Räihä – recording
- Dan Lancaster – producer, mixing, recording (vocals)

== Charts ==
Chart performance for Moonflowers
Chart (2021)	Peak position
Swiss Albums (Schweizer Hitparade)	49
