= Rajaton rakkaus =

2000 single by Timo Rautiainen & Trio Niskalaukaus

Song by Timo Rautiainen & Trio Niskalaukaus

from the album Itku pitkästä ilosta
- Released: 2000
- Genre: Heavy metal
- Length: 3:40

"Rajaton rakkaus" (lit. 'Borderless love') is a 2000 heavy metal song by Finnish band Timo Rautiainen & Trio Niskalaukaus. It is one of the most known songs released by the band. It was released on the album Itku pitkästä ilosta and as a single. The song is based on a true story about a man who took his own life due to troubles in love. The song tells about an unspecified man who lives in Finland and has married a woman in Estonia. The woman refuses to move to Finland with his husband. The man realizes he will never meet his wife and hangs himself near the end of the song ("The roof is too low and the rope is too thick").

== Track listing ==
Single
No.	Title	Length
1.	"Rajaton rakkaus"	3:40
2.	"Viimeinen päivä taivaan?" (Finnish-language cover of Barathrum's "Last Day in Heaven")	4:10
