= Nasum =

Swedish grindcore band

- Origin: Örebro, Sweden
- Genre: Grindcore
- Years active: 1992–2005, 2012
- Labels: Burning Heart, Relapse
- Past members: Anders Jakobson; Rickard Alriksson; Mieszko Talarczyk; Jesper Liveröd; Urban Skytt; Jon Lindqvist
- Website: nasum.com

Nasum (pronounced 'nah-zumm') was a Swedish grindcore band from Örebro, formed in 1992. The band released four studio albums and became "one of that country's premier metal acts". They disbanded after frontman Mieszko Talarczyk, was killed in the December 2004 Indian Ocean tsunami.

In 2012, Nasum reunited with Rotten Sound frontman Keijo Niinimaa replacing Talarczyk, for a one-off, 20th-anniversary tour.

Nasum has been referred to as "Sweden's Napalm Death" by journalists such as Andy O'Connor of Spin.

== Biography ==
Anders Jakobson (guitar) and Rickard Alriksson (drums/vocals), former members of the band Necrony, formed Nasum in 1992. The band's name is Latin for "nose" and was taken from horror film Flesh for Frankenstein. Necrony's record label offered Nasum a slot on a split 7-inch. After guitarist Mieszko Talarczyk joined the band in 1993, the band was featured on the Blind World split EP with Agathocles. After several more splits, Nasum released an MCD (mini compact disc) of their own with Poserslaughter Records in 1995.

Alriksson departed Nasum as the band started touring. Guitarist Jakobson moved to drums and Talarczyk handled guitars and vocals. More EPs and splits followed over 1996 and 1997. In 1998, Nasum released their first full-length album, Inhale/Exhale, on Relapse Records. As the band expanded their audience and touring, they recruited full-time bassist Jesper Liveröd (from Burst) in early 1999. The second album, Human 2.0, was released in April 2000 to critical acclaim, and was followed by two years of touring and performing in support of the work, including a stop in Japan.

The third album, Helvete, was released in 2003 and featured Napalm Death's Shane Embury. It was well received and led to more high-profile appearances, especially on the European festival circuit. At that time, second guitarist Urban Skytt joined Nasum, and bassist Jon Lindqvist replaced Liveröd. In 2004, Nasum released Shift and continued touring.

Talarczyk went on vacation to Thailand shortly before the 26 December, 2004 Indian Ocean earthquake and tsunami. His death was officially confirmed on 17 February 2005, and Nasum disbanded. A compilation, Grind Finale, was released in 2006 and a live album featuring a 2004 show from Osaka, Doombringer, was released in early 2008.

In October 2011, Nasum announced a special one-off tour to celebrate the band's 20th anniversary the following year. Rotten Sound frontman Keijo Niinima filled in for Talarczyk . The band played their final show on October 6, 2012, in Stockholm. A concert film documentary called Nasum: Blasting Shit to Bits – The Final Show chronicling the show was premiered in 2017 and released on DVD in 2020.

Anders Jakobson has stated that Nasum will never reunite.

== Members ==
Final lineup

- Anders Jakobson – guitar, vocals (1992–1995), drums, vocals (1995–2005, 2012)
- Mieszko Talarczyk – guitar, vocals (1993–2004; died 2004)
- Urban "Ubbe" Skytt – guitar (2003–2005, 2012)
- Jon "Elle" Lindqvist – bass, vocals (2003–2005), guitar, vocals (2012)

Former members

- Rickard Alriksson – drums, vocals (1993–1995)
- Jesper Liveröd – bass, vocals (1999–2003, 2012)

Touring members

- Per Karlsson – drums (1995)
- Keijo Niinimaa – vocals (2012)

== Discography ==
Studio albums

- Inhale/Exhale (1998)
- Human 2.0 (2000)
- Helvete (2003)
- Shift (2004)

EPs

- Blind World – split w/ Agathocles (7-inch, 1993)
- Grindwork – split w/ Retaliation, Clotted Symmetric Sexual Organ and Vivisection (Mini CD, 1994)
- Industrislaven (12-inch, 1995)
- Smile When You're Dead – split w/ Psycho (7-inch, 1996)
- World in Turmoil (7-inch, 1997)
- The Black Illusions – split w/ Abstain (7-inch, 1998)
- Untitled bonus 7-inch EP that came with the Inhale/Exhale LP (7-inch, 1998)
- The Nasum/Warhate Campaign – split w/ Warhate (7-inch, 1999)
- Split w/ Asterisk (7-inch, Busted Heads Records, 2000)
- Split w/ Skitsystem (7-inch, 2002)

Compilation

- Grind Finale (2006)

Live album

- Doombringer (2008)

Demo

- Domedagen (1994)

Compilation appearances

- Really Fast Vol. 9 (1993)
- Regressive Hostility (1997)
- In Defence of Our Future – A Tribute to Discharge (song "Visions of War") (1997)
- The Bloodbath Is Coming 2×7″ (song "The Bloodbath Is Coming") (1999)
- Requiems of Revulsion: A Tribute to Carcass (song "Tools of the Trade") (2000)
- Polar Grinder (2001)
- Grind Your Mind – A History of Grindcore (2008)
