= Inhale/Exhale (Nasum album) =

Studio album by Nasum
- Released: 26 May 1998
- Recorded: December 1997–January 1998
- Studios: Soundlab Studios, Örebro, Sweden
- Genre: Grindcore
- Length: 45:09
- Label: Relapse
- Producers: Nasum; Mathias Färm; Per Lindberg

Nasum chronology
Inhale/Exhale (1998)	Human 2.0 (2000)

Professional ratings
Review scores
Source	Rating
AllMusic	3/5 stars
Chronicles of Chaos	8.5/10
Collector's Guide to Heavy Metal	6/10
The Encyclopedia of Popular Music	3/5 stars
Metal.de	8/10
Rock Hard	8.5/10
Terrorizer	4.5/5 stars

Inhale/Exhale is the debut studio album by the Swedish grindcore band Nasum. It was released on 26 May 1998 on Relapse Records.

The album has been credited with reviving the grindcore scene, following a period of downturn in the 1990s. Napalm Death have also credited the album for encouraging them to return to their faster, grindcore roots with Enemy of the Music Business (2000).

== Track listing ==
No.	Title	Writer(s)	Length
1.	"This Is..."	Anders Jakobson	0:24
2.	"The Masked Face"	Jakobson	1:51
3.	"Digging In"	Mieszko Talarczyk	0:18
4.	"Time to Act!"	Talarczyk	1:21
5.	"Disdain and Contempt"	Jakobson	0:32
6.	"I See Lies"	Jakobson	1:10
7.	"Inhale / Exhale"	Jakobson	1:35
8.	"Too Naked to Distort"	Talarczyk	0:48
9.	"There's No Escape"	Talarczyk	1:40
10.	"The Rest Is Over"	Jakobson	1:09
11.	"Disappointed"	Jakobson	1:08
12.	"Lägg om!"	Talarczyk	0:18
13.	"You're Obsolete"	Jakobson	1:11
14.	"Tested"	Talarczyk	1:20
15.	"Shapeshifter"	Jakobson	1:09
16.	"Feed Them, Kill Them, Skin Them"	Talarczyk	0:50
17.	"When Science Fails"	Talarczyk	1:49
18.	"Closing In"	Talarczyk	1:00
19.	"The World That You Made"	Jakobson	0:57
20.	"The System Has Failed Again"	Talarczyk	0:33
21.	"For What Cause"	Talarczyk	1:01
22.	"Fullmatad"	Talarczyk	0:54
23.	"Screwed"	Talarczyk	0:41
24.	"Shaping the End"	Talarczyk	2:22
25.	"The New Firing Squad"	Jakobson	0:58
26.	"No Sign of Improvement"	Talarczyk	1:46
27.	"My Philosophy"	Jakobson	0:56
28.	"I'm Not Silent"	Jakobson	0:49
29.	"The Breathing Furnace"	Jakobson	1:21
30.	"Information Is Free"	Jakobson	1:27
31.	"Burning Inside"	Jakobson	1:33
32.	"A Request for Guidance"	Jakobson	0:47
33.	"Grey"	Jakobson	1:04
34.	"Worldcraft"	Talarczyk	2:34
35.	"It's Never Too Late"	Jakobson	0:33
36.	"Du Är Bevakad"	Talarczyk	1:09
37.	"Blinded"	Jakobson	0:39
38.	"Can De Lach"	Jakobson	3:13
Total length:			45:09

== Personnel ==
Nasum

- Mieszko Talarczyk - guitars, bass guitar, screaming vocals
- Anders Jakobson - drums, death growls

Production

- Robert Ahlborg - photography, artwork
- Adam Peterson - artwork
- William J. Yurkiewicz Jr. - executive producer
- Matthew F. Jacobson - executive producer
- Mieszko Talarczyk - engineering, mixing, editing, pre-mastering
- Anders Jakobson - mixing, layout, logo
- Mathias Färm - recording, engineering
- Dan Swanö - editing, pre-mastering
- Per Lindberg - recording
- Dave Shirk - mastering
