= Moonflowers (album) =

Studio album by Swallow the Sun
- Released: 19 November 2021
- Genre: Death-doom, gothic metal, doom metal
- Length: 52:40
- Label: Century Media
- Producer: Juha Raivio

Swallow the Sun chronology
When a Shadow Is Forced into the Light (2019)	Moonflowers (2021)	Shining (2024)

Singles from Moonflowers
- 1. "Woven into Sorrow" Released: 24 September 2021; 2. "Enemy" Released: 20 October 2021

Professional ratings
Review scores
Source	Rating
AngryMetalGuy	3/5 stars
AllMusic	4/5 stars
Blabbermouth.net	9/10
Metal Injection	9/10
Sonic Perspectives	8.6/10
Sputnikmusic	4.4/5

Moonflowers is the eighth studio album by Finnish death-doom band Swallow the Sun. It was released on 19 November 2021 through Century Media Records.

== Track listing ==
All music is composed by Juha Raivio, except where noted.

No.	Title	Length
1.	"Moonflowers Bloom in Misery"	6:19
2.	"Enemy"	5:39
3.	"Woven into Sorrow"	7:46
4.	"Keep Your Heart Safe from Me"	7:47
5.	"All Hallows' Grieve"	5:37
6.	"The Void"	5:39
7.	"The Fight of Your Life"	7:13
8.	"This House Has No Home"	6:40
Total length:		52:40

== Personnel ==
Swallow the Sun

- Mikko Kotamäki – lead vocals
- Juho Räihä – rhythm guitar
- Juha Raivio – lead guitar, backing vocals, keyboards
- Matti Honkonen – bass guitar
- Juuso Raatikainen – drums

Guest musicians

- Jaani Peuhu – backing vocals
- Antti Hyyrynen – backing vocals (tracks 3, 7)
- Cammie Gilbert – vocals (track 5)
- Aino Rautakorpi – violin
- Helena Dumell – viola
- Annika Furstenborg – cello

Production and art

- Hannu Honkonen – post-production (midi strings)
- Doppelganger-Art – artwork (band members painting)
- Rami Mursula – layout
- Tony Lindgren – mastering
- David Castillo – recording (drums, clean vocals)
- Juha Raivio – cover art, producer
- Juho Räihä – mixing, recording (growl vocals, guitars, bass, strings)

== Charts ==
Chart performance for Moonflowers
Chart (2021)	Peak position
Finnish Albums (Suomen virallinen lista)	2
Swiss Albums (Schweizer Hitparade)	61
