= Iconcrash =

Finnish rock band

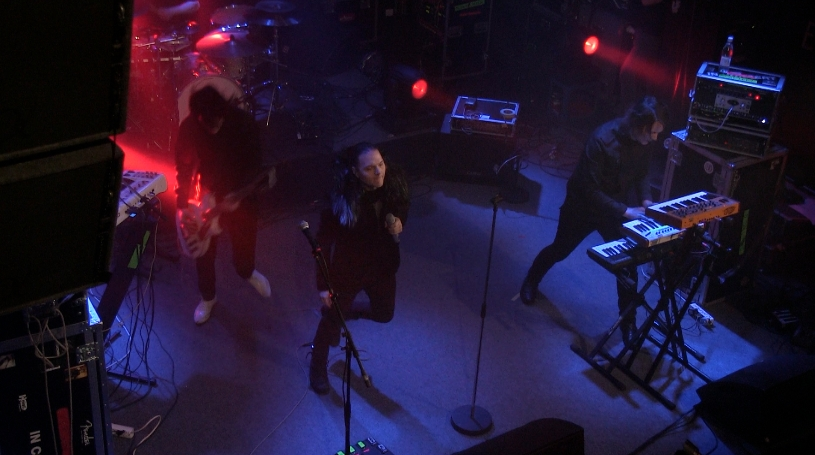

Background information
- Origin: Helsinki, Finland
- Genres: Rock, electronica
- Years active: 2003–present
- Label: Indie
- Members: Jaani Peuhu (vocals, guitar); Arttu Juntunen (keyboard, backing vocals); Matti Toivonen (guitar); Oskari "Ose" Vilmunen (drums); Riku-Niilo Mattila (bass)
- Past members: Reko Aho (drums); Jani Marjoniemi (guitar, bass); Riku Kuukka (guitar); Jesse Valo (bass); Anu Tukeva (keyboard, backing vocals)
- Website: iconcrash.com

Iconcrash is a Finnish Electronic rock/darkwave band from Helsinki, formed by vocalist/composer Jaani Peuhu. Now the band members include Arttu Juntunen, keyboard and backing vocals, Riku-Niilo Mattila, bass, Matti Toivonen, guitar, and Oskari Vilmunen, drums. The English-Finnish record company Parole Records published their debut album Nude in spring 2005, after which the live band was assembled.

Their second album, Enochian Devices, was published in spring 2010 with the collaboration of Dynasty Recordings and EMI Finland. The album was recorded at Dynasty Studios and at Sonic Pump, and the production lasted over a year. The album was received well, and the singles Strange, Strange Dark Star, and Everlasting got plenty of radio play and reached the top of YleX:s most wanted list. Strange, Strange Dark Star also appeared in Clive Barker's movie Midnight Meat Train, to which it was remixed by Justin Larsen (Lady Gaga, Linkin Park, Nine Inch Nails), and three songs were also in the soundtrack of Blackout, a movie by Petteri Summanen

Inkeroinen, the third album of the band, was published on 14 September 2011 by Dynasty Helsinki. For a little over half a year, the album was recorded at Sonic Pump in Helsinki, Miloco Music Box in London, in the mansion of Magnusborg in Porvoo, and at Ten Studios in Stockholm. Under the leadership of Peuhu, the members of the band worked intensively as a production team during the recordings. In addition, many esteemed professionals contributed to the making of the album, including Lee Slater (The Vaccines, Thirty Seconds to Mars, Kylie Minogue, Glasvegas), Arttu Peljo (Chisu, Disco Ensemble, Sunrise Avenue, Jenni Vartiainen), Antti Eräkangas (Lauri, Von Hertzen Brothers, The Rasmus), and Sampo Haapaniemi (Egotrippi, Teleks, Johanna Kurkela). The video of Stockholm was in rotation on Voice TV and MTV Finland.

In spring 2012, Iconcrash participated successfully in the UMK-competition, in which Finland's representative to the Eurovision is also chosen. With their song We Are The Night the band made it to the finals and played a live TV show for half a million people from the Helsinki Ice Hall. The song also got a lot of radio play, and it was voted to the top of YleX:'s most wanted list three times and was also playlisted on Estonian Radio 2.

In addition to touring extensively in Finland, Iconcrash has been playing in England, Russia, Central Europe, the Baltic countries and the United States. The band has also played with international groups including My Chemical Romance, Kaiser Chiefs, The White Lies, Anathema, Royal Republic , and Atari Teenage Riot.

== Discography ==
- "Happy?" (promo CD single) (2003)
- Viola / Iconcrash EP (11 March 2004)
- Nude (16 March 2005)
- "The Lovers" (radio single, 2005)
- "Strange, Strange Dark Star" (single, 2009)
- "Everlasting" (single, 2009)
- Enochian Devices (26 May 2010)
- "Sleeper" (single, 2010)
- "Never Ever" (single, 2010)
- "Delete" (single, 2011)
- "Stockholm" (single, 2011)
- Inkeroinen (14 September 2011)
- "We Are the Night" (single, 2012)
- Inkeroinen Special Edition (Including "We Are The Night") (29 February 2012)

=== Compilations ===
- Kunigunda Lunaria Songs vol. 4. Released 2005. Includes "The Lovers"
- Asian Billboard Promo Released 2005. Includes "The Lovers"
- Clive Barker's The Midnight Meat Train Soundtrack Album 2008. Track:"Strange, Strange Dark Star" (Justin Lassen Remix)
- Mama Trash Family Artists Volume II: In Trash We Trust. Compilation Album 2008, Track: "Lullaby For Nicole"
- Blackout Soundtrack. Released 2008. Includes "Faith"
- Herbert The Misanthropical Fly Remixes. Released 2011. Includes "He Who Has a Dream (Iconcrash Remix)"
- UMK Compilation Released 2012. Includes "We Are the Night"

== Current members ==
- Jaani Peuhu
- Arttu Juntunen
- Matti Toivonen – Matti Toivonen has formerly played with the band Valerian.
- Oskari Vilmunen – Oskari Vilmunen has formerly played with the bands Come Inside, KMA and Heaven'n Hell.
- Riku-Niilo Mattila – Riku-Niilo Mattila, as well as playing with Iconcrash, also plays with the band Scarlet Youth

== Collaborators ==
- Rory Winston, as well as collaborating on several lyrics with Jaani, is a published poet and screenwriter who has penned songs for Indica's, Private Line, Pete Parkkonen
- Sampo Haapaniemi (Egotrippi, Teleks, Johanna Kurkela) co produced Inkeroinen
- Lee Slater (The Vaccines, Thirty Seconds to Mars, Kylie Minogue, Glasvegas) mixed Stockholm and Delete for Inkeroinen
- Arttu Peljo (Chisu, Disco Ensemble, Sunrise Avenue, Jenni Vartiainen) mixed Dangerous for Inkeroinen
- Antti Eräkangas (Lauri, Von Hertzen Brothers, The Rasmus) mixed Inkeroinen
- Pauli Rantasalmi (The Rasmus) featured in Enochian Devices
- Timo Tolkki (ex Stratovarius) featured in Enochian Devices
- Emily Cheeger aka Vuk featured with vocals in Nude and Enochian Devices
