= Rotten Sound =

Finnish grindcore band

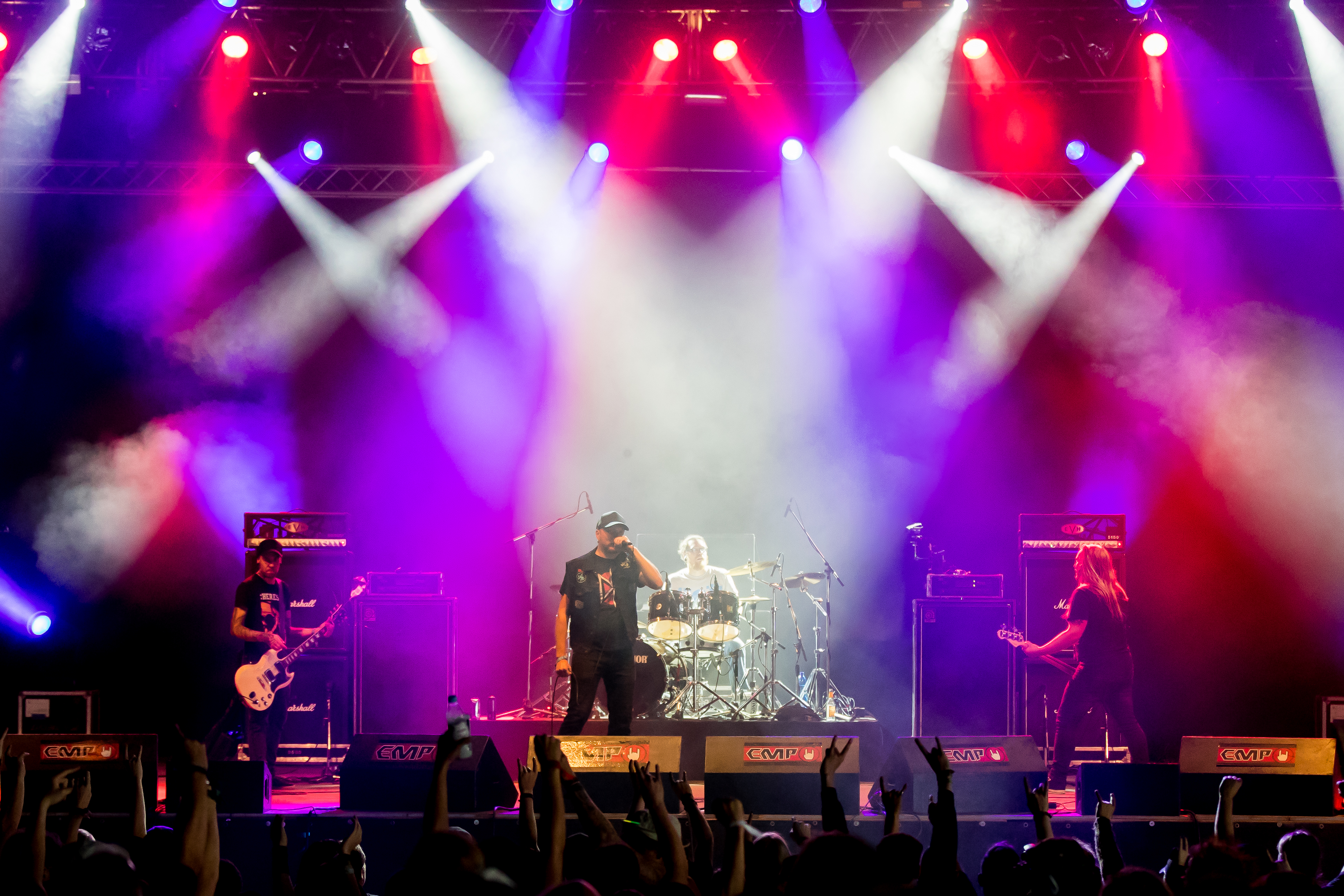
- Rotten Sound in 2016

Background information
- Origin: Vaasa, Finland
- Genre: Grindcore
- Years active: 1993–present
- Labels: Spinefarm, Willowtip, Relapse, Season of Mist, Genet
- Members: Mika Aalto; Keijo Niinimaa; Sami Latva; Kristian Toivainen
- Past members: Masa Kovero; Ville Väisänen; Pekka Ranta; Kai Hahto; Juha Ylikoski; Mika Häkki; Toni Pihlaja
- Website: rottensound.com

Rotten Sound is a Finnish grindcore band from Vaasa, formed in 1993. The band comprises guitarist Mika Aalto, vocalist Keijo Niinimaa, drummer Sami Latva, and bassist Matti Raappana. The band has released eight studio albums and "earned a reputation for being one of the most intense bands on the Scandinavian death metal/grindcore scene".

== History ==
=== Formation, Under Pressure and Drain (1993–2000) ===
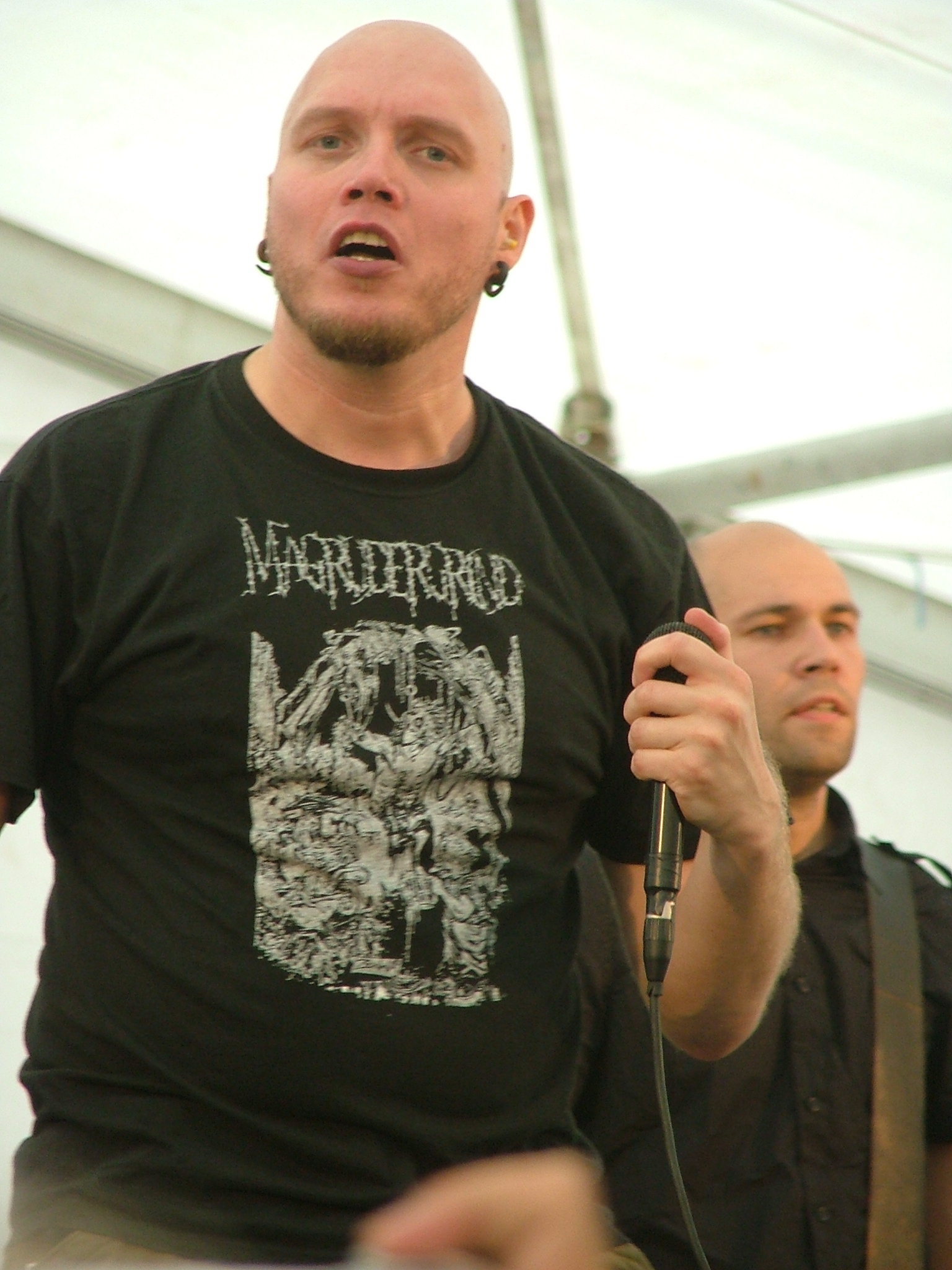
Keijo Niinimaa in 2008

Guitarist Mika Aalto formed Rotten Sound in Vaasa, Finland, in 1993. The group started recordings in 1994, releasing the single Sick Bastard through Genet Records. Their subsequent underground releases, between singles and EPs, included 1995's Psychotic Veterinarian on SOA, 1996's Loosin' Face on Anomie, and 1997's Splitted Alive on IDS.

Rotten Sound's first full-length album, Under Pressure, was released by Spanish label Repulse Records in 1998, and was followed by Drain in 1999 on the same label. This album was second guitarist Juha Ylikoski's debut. In early 2000, the band signed with American Necropolis Records, a subsidiary Deathvomit label, to release the EP Still Psycho, which included a cover of Carcass's "Reek of Putrefaction". Paul Kott of Allmusic praised the album saying, "Rotten Sound does a good job, and although the audio production does leave something to be desired, the finished product is well worth listening to for any fan of earlier death metal and more recent grindcore. The video segments are very well-produced, with fantastic live audio recording, multiple camera angles, and good edits." The band toured in Europe to promote the album with label mates Hateplow, In Aeturnum and Malevolent Creation.

=== Murderworks and Exit (2001–2005) ===
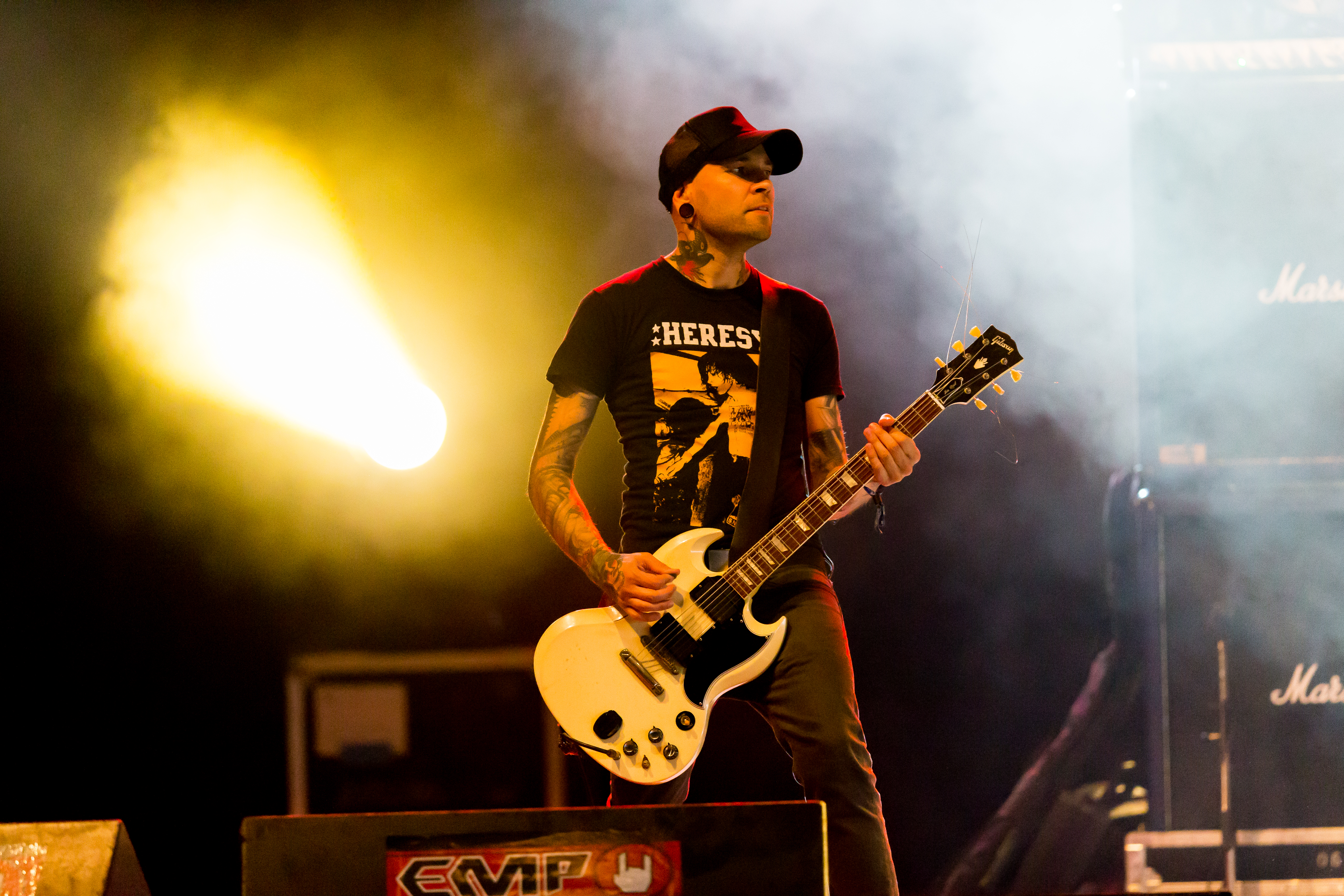
Mika Aalto in 2016

Rotten Sound release their second full-length, Murderworks, in 2002. Allmusic reviewer Alex Henderson stated, "This 2002 release gives the listener no room to breathe; from start to finish, Murderworks is an exercise in sensory assault for the sake of sensory assault." For the album's promotion, the group headlined a European tour, titled Murdering Europe, with support of two Czech bands, Fleshless and Lykathea Aflame. They toured Europe during June 2003, with Hateplow and Debauchery. In May 2004, Rotten Sound joined Circle of Dead Children, Phobia, and Strong Intention for the US Grind the East Coast tour. The band's fourth studio album, Exit, was recorded at Soundlab studio in Örebro, Sweden with engineer Mieszko Talarczyk and mastered at the Cutting Room. Shortly after release, the album peaked at number 22 on the Finnish album charts. In March 2005, the band joined Disfear for a co-headlining Scandinavian tour.

=== Consume to Contaminate and Cycles (2006–2007) ===
In January 2006, the band toured European on the "Grind Your Face Off Tour 2006" in support of reissued Murderworks released on 6 January 2006. The "Grind Your Face Off Tour" extended for four weeks across Europe. They released the eight-song mini-CD Consume to Contaminate on 7 June 2006 via Spinefarm Records. Rotten Sound supported Malevolent Creation on their European Tour in early 2007.

In July 2007, they began recording their fifth studio album, Cycles, released on 9 January 2008 via Spinefarm Records. The album was recorded and mixed with Janne Saksa at Kantola and Sound Supreme studios. Mastering was handled by Pelle Henricsson at Tonteknik Studios. The first song, "The Effects", was posted on their Myspace page.

=== Napalm and Cursed (2009–2011) ===
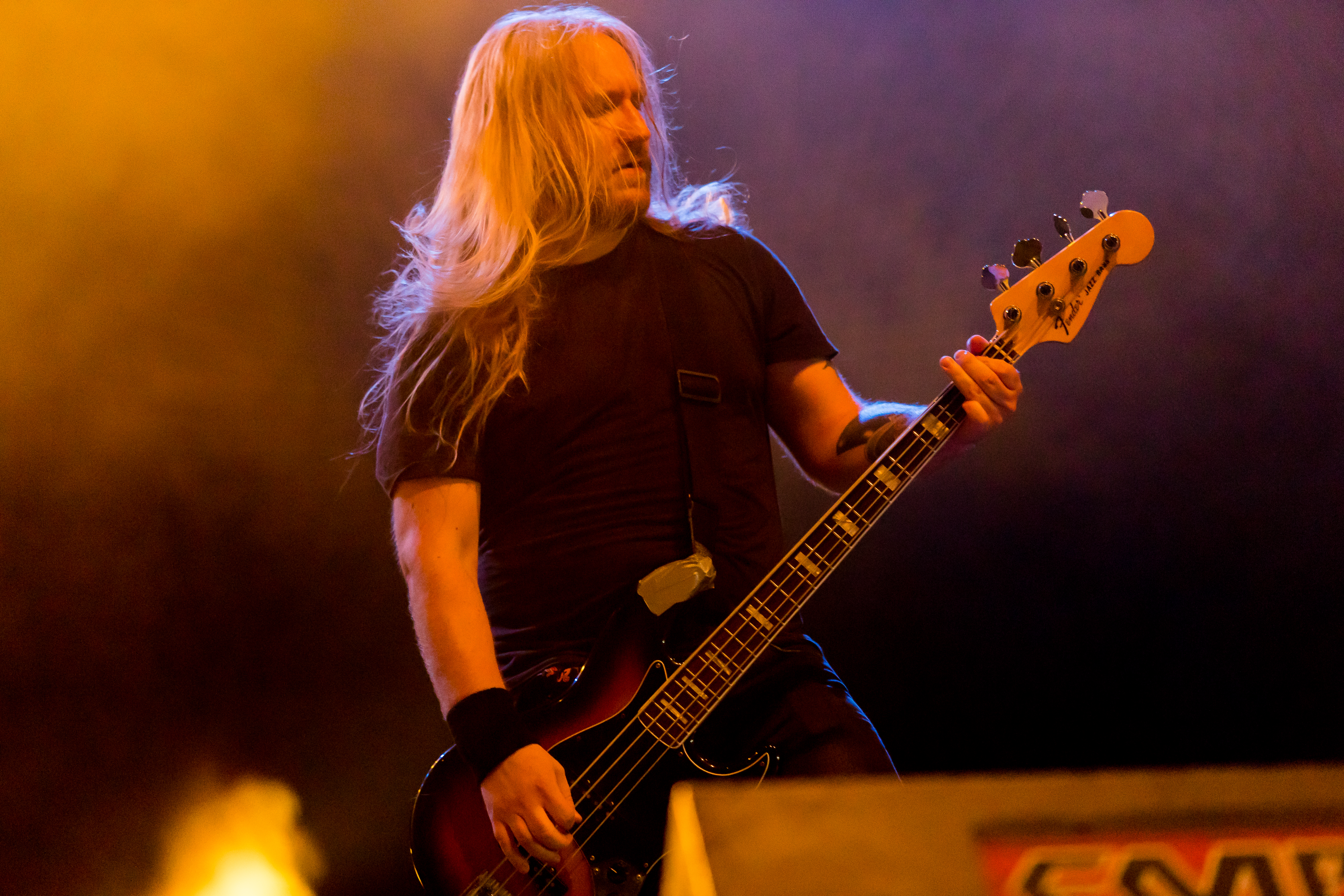
Kristian Toivainen joined in 2010

In November 2009, the band signed with Relapse Records to release their follow-up to Cycles. Keijo Niinimaa commented:

Relapse Records has been a strong label for grindcore since they started, which is one of the reasons that made us want to re-release our Murderworks album through them in 2005. We will fit to their roster like a fist to an ass. Being along the same line with other label-mates is very important for us because we want to tour all over this planet with bands we like ourselves. The upcoming Napalm EP and the next full-length album will start a new and (even) more aggressive era for Rotten Sound. Doing it together with Relapse Records will make this period more grind than any of our phases before.

Rotten Sound released the Napalm EP on 30 March 2010 via Relapse Records. It features three new tracks and three Napalm Death covers. Rotten Sound joined Aborted and The Red Chord for the "Machines of Grind" tour, a three-week co-headlining European tour. The tour started in mid-April, and included stops at the Neurotic Death Fest and Revolution Fest Open Air. The three bands co-headlined on several dates throughout the United Kingdom for "Terrorizer Tour-ture", a tour sponsored by Terrorizer Magazine.

In December 2010, Rotten Sound announced that their sixth studio album, Cursed, would be released on 15 March 2011 via Relapse Records (except in Finland, where it arrived on 16 March 2011 through Fullsteam Records). It was recorded at Nordic Audio Labs and deals with the six curses of mankind. Rotten Sound headlined the "Cursed to Tour" from April to May in Germany. The line up for this month-long tour included Trap Them, Gaza, The Kandidate, and Haust. Following this tour, Rotten Sound headed to Japan for the Kabuto Metal Fest. Other acts included Morbid Angel and The Haunted.

=== Species at War, Abuse to Suffer and Suffer to Abuse (2012–2021) ===
In January 2012, Rotten Sound announced the Grind Over Europe Tour 2012. Set to start on 24 February in Barcelona, Spain, the band toured 16 cities in three weeks with label-mates Exhumed and powerviolence group Magrudergrind. Rotten Sound toured in support of the band's sixth studio album, Cursed, issued in early 2011 via Relapse Records.

In November 2012, Rotten Sound signed to Season of Mist to a European deal. The band's next EP, Species at War, was recorded at Nordic Audio Labs and mixed and mastered by drummer Sami Latva at Latva Studios and released on 18 January 2013 on CD, etched vinyl, and digital. Keijo Niinimaa said,

Finding a strong label to release the EP and next full-length in Europe was our priority for this year,. ... We are very excited about this deal with Season Of Mist and we can't wait to get back on the road with the EP. Take a deep breath, get exhausted with Species At War and see you at the shows!

The band released its seventh studio album, Abuse to Suffer, in 2016. The album contains an audio sample excerpt of Noam Chomsky's 2011 speech at the Massachusetts Institute of Technology entitled The New War Against Terror: "Yeah, they’re rotten. Lot of rotten things in the world. We should be — if we’re serious — we should be concerned with what we do. And what we can do. If there’s an elementary moral truism, that’s it."

=== Apocalypse (2022–present) ===
On 15 December 2022, the band announced their eighth studio album, Apocalypse, released on 31 March 2023.

On 12 December 2025, the band released the EP Mass Extinction.

== Members ==
Current members

- Mika Aalto – guitars (1993–present)
- Keijo Niinimaa – vocals (1993–present)
- Sami Latva – drums (2006–present)
- David Kasipovic – bass (2020–present)

Former members

- Masa Kovero – bass (1994)
- Ville Väisänen – drums (1994)
- Kai Hahto – drums (1995–2006)
- Juha Ylikoski – guitars (1998–2001)
- Pekka Ranta – bass (1997–2000)
- Mika Häkki – bass (2000–2003)
- Toni Pihlaja – bass (2003–2010)
- Kristian Toivainen – bass (2010–2020)

== Discography ==
Studio albums

- 1997 – Under Pressure (Repulse/Revenge)
- 1999 – Drain (Repulse/S.O.A.)
- 2002 – Murderworks (Autopsy Stench/Necropolis/Century Media/Relapse)
- 2005 – Exit (Spinefarm/No Tolerance/Willowtip)
- 2008 – Cycles (Spinefarm)
- 2011 – Cursed (Relapse)
- 2016 – Abuse to Suffer (Season of Mist)
- 2023 – Apocalypse (Season of Mist)

Extended plays

- 1994 – Sick Bastard (Genet)
- 1995 – Psychotic Veterinarian (S.O.A.)
- 1996 – Loosin' Face (Anomie)
- 2000 – Still Psycho (Necropolis/Merciless)
- 2006 – Consume to Contaminate (Spinefarm/Power It Up)
- 2008 – Rotten Sound EP (Spinefarm)
- 2010 – Napalm (Relapse)
- 2013 – Species at War (Season of Mist)
- 2018 – Suffer to Abuse (Season of Mist)
- 2025 – Mass Extinction (Season of Mist)

Splits

- 1997 – Spitted Alive Split with Control Mechanism (I.D.S.)
- 2001 – 8 Hours of Lobotomy Split with Unholy Grave (M.C.R.)
- 2003 – Seeds of Hate Split with Mastic Scum (Cudgel Agency)

Singles

- 2011 – Curses (Fullsteam Records)

Compilations

- 2003 – From Crust 'Til Grind (Century Media) (Contains tracks from Sick Bastard, Psychotic Veterinarin, Loosin' Face and Still Psycho)

DVDs

- 2004 – Murderlive (Spinefarm)
- 2010 – Live at Obscene Extreme 2007 (Relapse)
