= Consume to Contaminate =

EP by Rotten Sound
- Released: 7 June 2006
- Recorded: April 2006
- Genre: Grindcore
- Length: 15:20
- Label: Spinefarm
- Producer: Janne Saksa, Rotten Sound

Rotten Sound chronology
Still Psycho (2000)	Consume to Contaminate (2006)	Napalm (2010)

Professional ratings
Review scores
Source	Rating
Decibel	(favorable)

Consume to Contaminate is a 2006 EP by Finnish band Rotten Sound. Upon release, the EP reached second position on the Finnish singles chart.

== Track listing ==
No.	Title	Length
1.	"Decay"	2:20
2.	"Loss"	1:48
3.	"Crime"	1:13
4.	"GDP"	3:02
5.	"CTC"	2:24
6.	"Flesh"	0:58
7.	"Fear"	1:42
8.	"Time"	1:48
Total length:		15:20

== Personnel ==
- Keijo Niinimaa – vocals
- Sami Latva – drums
- Mika Aalto – guitars
- Toni Pihlaja – bass
