= Forgive Her =

"Forgive Her..."

Single by Swallow the Sun
- Released: April 13, 2005
- Length: 15:25
- Label: Firebox Records
- Songwriters: Kai Hahto, Matti Honkonen, Markus Jämsen, Mikko Kotamäki, Aleksi Munter, Juha Raivio

Swallow the Sun singles chronology
| "Forgive Her..." (2005) | "Don't Fall Asleep (Horror Pt. 2)" (2007) |

"Forgive Her..." is a CD single by Swallow the Sun, released in 2005 by Firebox Records. The single was released only in Finland, where it reached number 4 in the charts. Guest vocals by Albert Witchfinder of the Finnish doom metal band Reverend Bizarre were featured on the song "Solitude", a cover of Candlemass.

== Track listing ==
1. "Forgive Her..." – 9:02
2. "Solitude" (Candlemass cover) – 6:04
