= Ghosts of Loss =

Studio album by Swallow the Sun
- Released: August 24, 2005
- Recorded: 24 January – 20 February 2005
- Genre: Death-doom; melodic death metal; gothic metal
- Length: 65:59
- Label: Firebox Records
- Producer: Swallow the Sun

Swallow the Sun chronology
| The Morning Never Came (2003) | Ghosts of Loss (2005) | Hope (2007) |

Professional ratings
Review scores
| Source | Rating |
|---|---|
| Allmusic | 3.5/5 stars |

Ghosts of Loss is the second studio album by Finnish death-doom band Swallow the Sun, released on August 24, 2005. Compared with their debut, this album has more influences of gothic metal. Some of its themes are greatly influenced by the 1990-91 TV serial Twin Peaks.

== Track listing ==
All songs written by Juha Raivio.

| No. | Title | Length |
|---|---|---|
| 1. | "The Giant" | 11:56 |
| 2. | "Descending Winters" | 6:11 |
| 3. | "Psychopath's Lair" | 5:52 |
| 4. | "Forgive Her..." | 9:00 |
| 5. | "Fragile" | 7:14 |
| 6. | "Ghost of Laura Palmer" | 8:07 |
| 7. | "Gloom, Beauty and Despair" | 8:45 |
| 8. | "The Ship" | 8:54 |

== Personnel ==
- Mikko Kotamäki - vocals
- Markus Jämsen - guitar
- Juha Raivio - guitar
- Aleksi Munter - keyboards
- Matti Honkonen - bass guitar
- Pasi Pasanen - drums

== Production ==
- Recorded, engineered & mixed by Sami Kokko.
- Mastered by Minerva Pappi.

== Chart positions ==
| Year | Chart | Peak |
|---|---|---|
| 2005 | Finnish Top 40 Albums Chart | 8 |

== Cultural references ==
The album contains multiple references to the TV series Twin Peaks. Laura Palmer is the girl around whose murder the series revolves. Guitarist Juha Raivio said in an interview, "The song got nothing to do with real Laura Palmer or Twin Peaks, but the feeling is there and everybody knows what kind of girl Laura really was. So, no love song here." The Giant is a character from the second season.
