= Shift (Nasum album) =

Studio album by Nasum
- Released: October 26, 2004
- Recorded: June 3 – July 13, 2004, at Soundlab Studios (Örebro, Sweden)
- Genre: Grindcore
- Length: 37:19
- Label: Burning Heart
- Producer: Nasum

Nasum chronology
| Helvete (2003) | Shift (2004) | Grind Finale (2005) |

Professional ratings
Review scores
| Source | Rating |
|---|---|
| AllMusic | 3.5/5 stars |
| Brave Words & Bloody Knuckles | 8.5/10 |
| The Encyclopedia of Popular Music | 3/5 stars |
| Metal.de | 10/10 |

Shift is the fourth and final studio album by the Swedish grindcore band Nasum. It was released on October 26, 2004, by Burning Heart Records in Sweden and on Relapse Records in North America. Two months after this album was released, lead singer Mieszko Talarczyk died during the 2004 Indian Ocean tsunami, which resulted in the disbanding of Nasum.

== Track listing ==
| No. | Title | Lyrics | Music | Length |
|---|---|---|---|---|
| 1. | "Particles" | Mieszko Talarczyk | Talarczyk | 1:15 |
| 2. | "The Engine of Death" | Anders Jakobson | Jakobson | 1:46 |
| 3. | "Twinkle, Twinkle Little Scar" | Jakobson | Jakobson | 1:46 |
| 4. | "No Paradise for the Damned" | Jakobson | Jakobson | 0:32 |
| 5. | "Wrath" | Jakobson | Jakobson | 2:14 |
| 6. | "Fear Is Your Weapon" | Talarczyk | Talarczyk | 0:43 |
| 7. | "The Deepest Hole" | Jon Lindqvist | Lindqvist | 1:47 |
| 8. | "High on Hate" | Jakobson | Jakobson | 0:40 |
| 9. | "Pathetic" | Talarczyk | Talarczyk | 1:22 |
| 10. | "Circle of Defeat" | Talarczyk | Talarczyk | 1:10 |
| 11. | "Like Cattle" | Lindqvist | Lindqvist | 1:36 |
| 12. | "Ros" | Talarczyk | Talarczyk | 1:25 |
| 13. | "The Smallest Man" | Talarczyk | Talarczyk | 2:07 |
| 14. | "Cornered" | Jakobson | Jakobson | 0:35 |
| 15. | "Strife" | Talarczyk | Talarczyk | 1:40 |
| 16. | "The Clash" | Jakobson | Jakobson | 1:31 |
| 17. | "Hets" | Jakobson | Jakobson | 1:26 |
| 18. | "Closer to the End" | Lindqvist | Lindqvist | 1:49 |
| 19. | "Fury" | Talarczyk | Talarczyk | 2:36 |
| 20. | "Fight Terror with Terror" | Talarczyk | Talarczyk | 2:26 |
| 21. | "Ett inflammerat sår" | Jakobson | Jakobson | 0:58 |
| 22. | "Deleted Scenes" | Jakobson | Jakobson | 2:34 |
| 23. | "Creature" | Lindqvist | Urban Skytt | 1:21 |
| 24. | "Darkness Falls" | Jakobson | Jakobson | 2:01 |
| 25. | "DLTD" (Japanese bonus track) | | | 0:39 |
| 26. | "Gravar" (Japanese bonus track) | | | 0:27 |
| Total length: | | | | 38:25 |

== Personnel ==
=== Nasum ===
- Mieszko Talarczyk – guitar, vocals, recording, mixing
- Anders Jakobson – drums, artwork
- Urban Skytt – guitar
- Jon Lindqvist – bass guitar

=== Additional personnel ===
- Petter Samuel Freed – guitar (2, 22)
- Rogga Johansson – vocals
- Peter in de Betou – mastering
- Robert Johansson – photography
- Robert Samsonowitz – artwork, design
