= Darkwoods My Betrothed =

Finnish black metal band

- Also known as: Virgin's Cunt (1993–1994)
- Origin: Kitee, Finland
- Genres: Black metal, symphonic black metal, viking metal
- Years active: 1993–1998, 2000–2001, 2020–present
- Labels: Napalm, Spinefarm
- Members: Teemu Kautonen: Jouni Mikkonen; Pasi Kankkunen; Tuomas Holopainen; Kai Hahto
- Past members: Tuomas Rytkönen: Juhana Salo; Larha Rytkönen; Juha Kokkonen; Tero Leinonen

Darkwoods My Betrothed are a Finnish black metal band from Kitee.

== History ==
Formed in 1993 as Virgin's Cunt, they set out to be the "most blasphemous black metal band in Europe". After recording a couple demos under this name, the band changed their name to Darkwoods My Betrothed. They recorded the demo Dark Aureolis Gathering in 1994, not too different from the band's roots in extreme black metal, but with maturity in the song-writing and delivery and combining a traditional black metal shriek with a wail-type of scream.

In 1995, Hammerheart Productions released Heirs of the Northstar, their first full-length album, which was a turning point for the group, as they started to experiment with a slower-paced and more melodic viking metal sound, and use of "drunken Viking" style clean vocals mixed with traditional black metal screams. The lyrics were also quite different from those in earlier songs. Moving away from dark and Satanic, bassist/lyricist Teemu began a fascination with Odinism and the Gods of Valhalla, and marked anger towards Christianity.

1996 saw the release of Autumn Roars Thunder, this time under the Solistitium label. Though retaining the same anti-Christian and Odinistic rhetoric, the music itself moved away from the melodic viking approach and returned to faster and more black metal-oriented songwriting.

In 1998, the band returned with Witch-Hunts, a conceptual album which eschewed much of the melodic stylings of the previous two albums; the Viking metal sound was now entirely replaced with black metal. Due to numerous delays by the record label, it was released roughly one year after it was originally planned.

After the release of Witch-Hunts, the band split up until they came back in 2000 with a new line-up, a compilation album and potential live work. In 2001, the band split up again.

In December 2020, Teemu "Hexenmeister" Kautonen said in a Finnish Inferno-magazine interview that Darkwoods My Betrothed are active and will release their next studio album in late 2021. The album title was later announced on 6 February 2021 as Angel of Carnage Unleashed. The album was released on 12 November 2021. The first single "In Evil, Sickness and in Grief" was released on 30 August 2021.

Upon release, Angel of Carnage Unleashed received widespread coverage in the music press, garnering fair to excellent reviews upon release.

== Band members ==
=== Current ===
- Teemu "Hexenmeister" Kautonen – bass (1993–1996, 2020–present)
- Jouni "Hallgrim" Mikkonen – guitars (1993–1998, 2004–2005, 2020–present), bass (1996–1998)
- Pasi "Emperor Nattasett" Kankkunen – vocals (1993–1998, 2020–present), bass (2004–2005), drums (1993)
- Tuomas Holopainen – keyboards (2020–present; session 1993–1998)
- Kai Hahto – drums (2020–present)

=== Former ===
- Tuomas "Spellgoth" Rytkönen – vocals (2004–2005)
- Juhana "Icelord" Salo – guitars (2004–2005)
- Lauri "Larha" Rytkönen – drums (2004–2005)
- Juha "Magician" Kokkonen – keyboards (2004–2005)
- Tero "Ante Mortem" Leinonen – guitars, vocals (2004)

=== Session ===
- Emppu Vuorinen – guitars
- Tero Leinonen – drums (1994–1996)

Timeline

== Discography ==
Albums

- Heirs of the Northstar (1995)
- Autumn Roars Thunder (1996)
- Witch-Hunts (1998)
- Angel of Carnage Unleashed (2021)

Compilations

- Dark Aureoles Gathering (2000)

Demos

- Dark Aureolis Gathering (1994)
