= Cursed (Rotten Sound album) =

Studio album by Rotten Sound
- Released: 15 March 2011
- Genre: Grindcore
- Length: 27:42
- Label: Relapse
- Producer: Panu Posti, Rotten Sound

Rotten Sound chronology
Napalm (2010)	Cursed (2011)	Species at War (2013)

Cursed is the sixth studio album by Finnish grindcore band Rotten Sound. Music videos were made for "Hollow" and "Self".

== Track listing ==
No.	Title	Length
1.	"Alone"	0:59
2.	"Superior"	1:29
3.	"Self"	1:23
4.	"Choose"	1:50
5.	"Hollow"	2:46
6.	"Ritual"	1:46
7.	"Green"	0:50
8.	"Machinery"	1:11
9.	"Power"	1:09
10.	"Plan"	1:25
11.	"Declare"	2:46
12.	"Addict"	2:20
13.	"Exploit"	1:35
14.	"Terrified"	2:23
15.	"Scared"	1:21
16.	"Doomed"	2:29
Total length:		27:42

== Personnel ==
- Keijo Niinimaa – vocals
- Mika Aalto – guitars
- Sami Latva – drums
- Kristian Toivainen – bass

Additional personnel

- Saku Hakuli – lead guitar on "Self" and "Hollow"
- Eran Segal – lead guitar on "Plan"
- Juha Ylikoski – lead guitar on "Ritual"
- Johan Eriksson – vocals on "Self"
- L-G Petrov – vocals on "Superior" and "Choose"
- Jason Netherton – vocals on "Alone", "Hollow", "Machinery", and "Terrified"

Production

- Nico Elgstrand – engineering
- Scott Hell – mastering editor
- Panu Posti – mastering, mixing, production
- Orion Landau – artwork
