= Human 2.0 =

Studio album by Nasum
- Released: 18 April 2000
- Recorded: 2–17 October and 14 November – 6 December 1999
- Genre: Grindcore
- Length: 38:18
- Label: Relapse
- Producer: Nasum

Nasum chronology
Inhale/Exhale (1998)	Human 2.0 (2000)	Helvete (2003)

Professional ratings
Review scores
Source	Rating
AllMusic	4/5 stars
Collector's Guide to Heavy Metal	7/10
The Encyclopedia of Popular Music	4/5 stars
Kerrang!	5/5 stars
Metal Hammer	9/10
Punknews.org	4/5 stars
Rock Hard	8.5/10
Terrorizer	8/10

Human 2.0 is the second studio album by the Swedish grindcore band Nasum. The band came up with the title during 1999 as a reference to some of the panic over issues such as the Y2K bug.

The band decided that they wanted the cover to be white in order to stand out from the many dark album covers that other bands used.

Although the album Inhale/Exhale was never released in Japan, Relapse had made a deal with Ritual Records/Howling Bull for Human 2.0. The band had already had the idea of updating the title for the Japanese release and make it Human 2.01, with additional bonus tracks.

The album contains a number of references to popular culture. "Resistance" uses a quote from the movie The Matrix: "I hate this place. This zoo. This prison. This reality, whatever you want to call it, I can't stand it any longer." The song "Sometimes Dead is Better" uses the quote "Welcome to the desert of the real". In "Parting Is Such Sweet Sorrow", the beginning quote is from the movie The Shawshank Redemption.

In 2020, it was named one of the 20 best metal albums of 2000 by Metal Hammer magazine.

== Track listing ==
No.	Title	Length
1.	"Mass Hypnosis"	1:03
2.	"A Welcome Breeze of Stinking Air"	1:40
3.	"Fatal Search"	0:27
4.	"Shadows"	2:24
5.	"Corrosion"	2:07
6.	"Multinational Murderer's Network"	2:18
7.	"Parting Is Such Sweet Sorrow"	0:41
8.	"The Black Swarm"	1:22
9.	"Sixteen"	1:51
10.	"Alarm"	2:12
11.	"Detonator"	1:37
12.	"Gargoyles and Grotesques"	1:01
13.	"När Dagarna..." (When the Days...)	0:59
14.	"Resistance"	2:32
15.	"The Idiot Parade"	1:33
16.	"Den Svarta Fanan" (The Black Banner)	0:59
17.	"We're Nothing But Pawns"	0:49
18.	"Defragmentation"	1:42
19.	"Sick System"	0:18
20.	"The Professional League"	2:38
21.	"Old and Tired?"	1:12
22.	"Words to Die For"	2:03
23.	"Riot"	0:39
24.	"The Meaningless Trial"	1:02
25.	"Sometimes Dead Is Better"	2:57
