= Aleah Stanbridge =

South African singer-songwriter (1976–2016)

- Born: Julia Liane Stanbridge; 1 July 1976; Cape Town, South Africa
- Died: 18 April 2016 (aged 39) Örebro, Sweden
- Genres: Doom metal, progressive metal, gothic metal
- Occupations: Singer-songwriter, photographer
- Instrument: Vocals
- Years active: 2005–2016

Aleah Liane Stanbridge (born Julia Liane Stanbridge; 1 July 1976 – 18 April 2016), better known mononymously as Aleah, or Aleah Starbridge, was a South African singer-songwriter based in Örebro, Sweden where she lived until her death. In 2009, she and Finnish guitarist Juha Raivio founded death/doom inspired band Trees of Eternity. Aleah became well known in the rock and metal genre for her collaborations such as Swallow the Sun and Amorphis.

== Career ==
=== 2005–2007: Aleah Demo ===
After relocating to Sweden, Aleah first became known after she was featured on Swedish electronic musician Krister Linder's "Don't Lose Your Way" from his 2006 album Songs from the Silent Years and its remixes.

Stanbridge released a dark folk/gothic rock demo under the name "Aleah" in 2007.

=== 2008–2015: Trees of Eternity, Swallow the Sun, and other musical collaborations ===
Some time in 2008, Stanbridge became lead singer of an obscure band, That Which Remains.

In mid-2009, she met guitarist Juha Raivio from Swallow the Sun, who was looking for a soloist to work on the song "Lights on the Lake" for the upcoming album New Moon. The plan was to feature Aleah's vocals on part of the song already prepared by Juha, but when they instead began to experiment with a vocal line Aleah had written for the occasion the session quickly headed off in a new direction took on a life of its own. Stanbridge and Raivio new musical collaboration project was named Trees of Eternity, a doom metal band with an ambient folk sound and ghostly female vocals, with Stanbridge as the vocals and lyricist, and Juha on guitars. The band worked on a four-song promo, Black Ocean and was released in 2013 on the internet with great response, as well sent limited signed physical copies to fans.

In 2012, Aleah returned as a guest for Swallow the Sun's album Emerald Forest and the Blackbird and appeared in the music video for song "Cathedral Walls", which featured Swedish singer Anette Olzon who was in Nightwish at the time.

In 2015, she sang as a guest on Under the Red Cloud by Finnish heavy metal band Amorphis.

The same year she was yet again on Swallow the Sun's album Songs from the North I, II & III. Not only did she provide vocals, she also worked on the band's photo shoot and cover art for the album.

=== 2016–2018: Death, Hour of the Nightingale, Hallatar, future solo album ===
On 18 April 2016, Stanbridge died of cancer. At 2:13 pm on the same day, the Swedish band Draconian's Facebook page announced the death of the singer, the news was also carried by several online articles. Her death was confirmed, two days later, by Juha Raivio. Juha also confirmed that the Trees of Eternity debut album will be released as planned and was in the post-production phase. Her death announcement has a haunting, black & white video of her singing the song Sinking Ships, accompanied by acoustic guitar.

A few months later, Juha announced the name of their debut Hour of the Nightingale and released a lyric video for their new single "Broken Mirror". The album was released on 11 November 2016 through Svart Records.

In February 2017, Svart Records announced the new band Hallatar which consists of Juha Raivio, Tomi Joutsen of Amorphis, and Gas Lipstick, former drummer for the band HIM. The band's lyrics consists of poems and lyrics of Aleah that Juha had gathered. Hallatar's debut album No Stars Upon the Bridge is dedicated to Aleah.

Hallatar's No Stars Upon the Bridge was released on 22 October 2017; the album features vocals by Heike Langhans from Draconian on the fourth track, "My Mistake".

In August 2017, Juha announced that he would soon be in the process on working Aleah's solo album, expecting for a 2018 release.

=== 2020: Aleah ===
On April 12, 2020, it was announced that preorders for Stanbridge's solo record would begin April 18, and that the record will be released July 1, 2020. On April 18, the first single "My Will" was released, and it was announced that it will be a double record that contains newly mastered songs as well as unreleased songs.

== Personal life ==
Aleah was in a relationship with Juha Raivio, a Finnish guitarist and founder of Swallow the Sun, from 2009.

== Discography ==
=== As Aleah ===
Demos

- Demo Master (2007)

Studio albums

- Aleah (2020)

=== With Trees of Eternity ===
Demos

- Black Ocean (2013)
- Sinking Ships (2016)

Studio albums

- Hour of the Nightingale (2016)

=== As a guest/session musician ===
- Krister Linder: Songs From The Silent Years (2006) – additional vocals on Don't Lose Your Way
- Omnimotion: Dream Wide Awake (2006) – additional vocals on Being, Days of Silence and Elves of Athoria
- Swallow the Sun: New Moon (2009) – guest vocals on Lights on the Lake
- Swallow the Sun: Emerald Forest and the Blackbird (2012) – guest vocals on Emerald Forest and the Blackbird and Labyrinth of London
- Coph Nia: Lashtal Lace (2015) – additional vocals on Lashtal Lace
- Amorphis: Under the Red Cloud (2015) – guest vocals on The Four Wise Ones and White Night
- Swallow the Sun: Songs from the North III (2015) – guest vocals on Heartstrings Shattering
- Hallatar: No Stars Upon the Bridge (2017) – guest vocals on Dreams Burn Down
- Antimatter: Black Market Enlightenment (2018) – guest vocals on Existential
