= Helvete (album) =

Studio album by Nasum
- Released: 13 May 2003
- Recorded: November 2002 – January 2003
- Genre: Grindcore
- Length: 35:16
- Label: Relapse
- Producer: Nasum

Nasum chronology
Human 2.0 (2000)	Helvete (2003)	Shift (2004)

Professional ratings
Review scores
Source	Rating
AllMusic	4.5/5 stars
Blabbermouth.net	9.5/10
Chronicles of Chaos	9/10
Collector's Guide to Heavy Metal	8/10
The Encyclopedia of Popular Music	4/5 stars
Kerrang!	4/5 stars
Metal.de	9/10
Ox-Fanzine	10/10
Rock Hard	8.5/10

Helvete (Swedish for "hell") is the third studio album by Swedish grindcore band Nasum, released in 2003 on Relapse Records. It received universal acclaim from critics.

== Background ==
Mitch Harris (Napalm Death) made a live music video for the song "Scoop". Shane Embury from Napalm Death plays bass guitar on "Drop Dead" and "Whip".

== Music ==
Tom Morgan of Invisible Oranges described Helvete as "relentless extreme metal mayhem," and according to him, "the production is especially crisp and brittle for a grindcore album."

== Legacy ==
In February 2009, Helvete was ranked number 2 in Terrorizer's list of essential European grindcore albums, with writer Olivier 'Zoltar' Badin describing it as "confirming Nasum as the undisputed kings of the new wave of Swedish grindcore". In December 2009, the magazine would name it the 47th greatest album of the 2000s.

Eduardo Rivadavia of AllMusic gave the album four and a half stars out of five, saying: "Easily among the best grindcore albums of the new millennium, Helvete is an absolute winner."

Tom Morgan of Invisible Oranges said the album "capture[d] the band at their most confident and well-realised," calling it "a grindcore album for the ages."

== Track listing ==
No.	Title	Length
1.	"Violation"	0:38
2.	"Scoop"	2:21
3.	"Living Next Door to Malice"	1:45
4.	"Stormshield"	2:23
5.	"Time to Discharge"	1:20
6.	"Bullshit"	0:46
7.	"Relics"	2:34
8.	"We Curse You All"	1:03
9.	"Doombringer"	2:00
10.	"Just Another Hog"	2:17
11.	"Drop Dead"	0:45
12.	"I Hate People"	1:36
13.	"Go!"	1:26
14.	"The Final Sleep"	1:41
15.	"Slaves to the Grind"	1:11
16.	"Breach of Integrity"	2:13
17.	"The Everlasting Shame"	1:25
18.	"Your Words Alone"	0:51
19.	"Preview of Hell"	1:49
20.	"Illogic"	1:27
21.	"Whip"	1:34
22.	"Worst Case Scenario"	1:58
