= Emerald Forest and the Blackbird =

Studio album by Swallow the Sun
- Released: February 1, 2012
- Recorded: September – October 2011
- Genre: Death-doom, progressive metal, melodic death metal
- Length: 67:03
- Label: Spinefarm, Svart Records
- Producer: Mikko Karmila, Hannu Honkonen

Swallow the Sun chronology
| New Moon (2009) | Emerald Forest and the Blackbird (2012) | Songs from the North I, II & III (2015) |

Professional ratings
Review scores
| Source | Rating |
|---|---|
| AllMusic | 3.5/5 stars |
| Exclaim! | |

Emerald Forest and the Blackbird is the fifth studio album by Finnish death-doom band Swallow the Sun. The album was released February 1, 2012, by Spinefarm Records. It was also released on limited LP on both green and white vinyl by Svart Records.

The Horror Series concludes from this album, also being on The Morning Never Came, Hope & New Moon.

On January 3, 2012, a music video for the track "Cathedral Walls" was released by the band. The song features guest vocals by former Nightwish vocalist Anette Olzon. The band made the entire album available for streaming on the Finnish metal magazine Inferno's website, from January 25 until its release a week later on February 1.

This is the last release with Kai Hahto, as he would quit to work with Nightwish two years later.

The song "April 14th" is a memorial to Peter Steele who died on that day in 2010.

== Track listing ==
All music is composed by Juha Raivio.

| No. | Title | Lyrics | Length |
|---|---|---|---|
| 1. | "Emerald Forest and the Blackbird" | Raivio | 9:58 |
| 2. | "This Cut Is the Deepest" | Mikko Kotamäki | 5:21 |
| 3. | "Hate, Lead the Way!" | Kotamäki | 6:14 |
| 4. | "Cathedral Walls" | Raivio | 6:54 |
| 5. | "Hearts Wide Shut" | Raivio | 5:56 |
| 6. | "Silent Towers" | Raivio | 4:01 |
| 7. | "Labyrinth of London (Horror Pt. IV)" | Raivio | 8:29 |
| 8. | "Of Death and Corruption" | Kotamäki | 5:00 |
| 9. | "April 14th" | Raivio | 8:29 |
| 10. | "Night Will Forgive Us" | Raivio | 6:41 |
| Total length: | | | 67:03 |

== Personnel ==
- Mikko Kotamäki - vocals
- Markus Jämsen - guitar
- Juha Raivio - guitar
- Aleksi Munter - keyboards
- Matti Honkonen - bass guitar
- Kai Hahto - drums

== Guests ==
- Aleah Stanbridge – vocals on tracks 1 and 7
- Anette Olzon – vocals on track 4
