= Plague of Butterflies =

2008 EP by Swallow the Sun

EP by Swallow the Sun
- Released: September 17, 2008
- Genres: Death-doom, melodic death metal
- Length: 60:20
- Label: Spinefarm
- Producer: Swallow the Sun

Swallow the Sun chronology
Hope (2007)	Plague of Butterflies (2008)	New Moon (2009)

Professional ratings
Review scores
Source	Rating
Allmusic	3.5/5 stars
Terrorizer	(Nov 2008)
Scream Magazine	5/6 stars

Plague of Butterflies is the first EP by Finnish death-doom band Swallow the Sun. It was released on September 17, 2008 in Finland and September 23, 2008 worldwide through Spinefarm Records. The song, "Plague of Butterflies", runs about 35 minutes in length and is divided into three parts, the first being titled "Losing the Sunsets," second being "Plague of Butterflies" and the last titled "Evael 10:00."

The bonus tracks on this EP are from the Demo "Out of This Gloomy Light" released in 2003. The tracks from this demo were composed and written by Juha Raivio.

== Track listing ==
All tracks written by Juha Raivio.

No.	Title	Length
1.	"Plague of Butterflies: "I. Losing the Sunsets"; "II. Plague of Butterflies"; "III. Evael 10:00"	34:42

Bonus tracks from the Demo "Out of This Gloomy Light"
No.	Title	Length
2.	"Through Her Silvery Body" (Demo)	8:01
3.	"Out of This Gloomy Light" (Demo)	5:34
4.	"Swallow (Horror, Part. I)" (Demo)	5:27
5.	"Under the Waves" (Demo)	6:36

== Chart positions ==
Year	Chart	Peak
2008	Finnish Single Chart	1
