= Jaani Peuhu =

Finnish musician

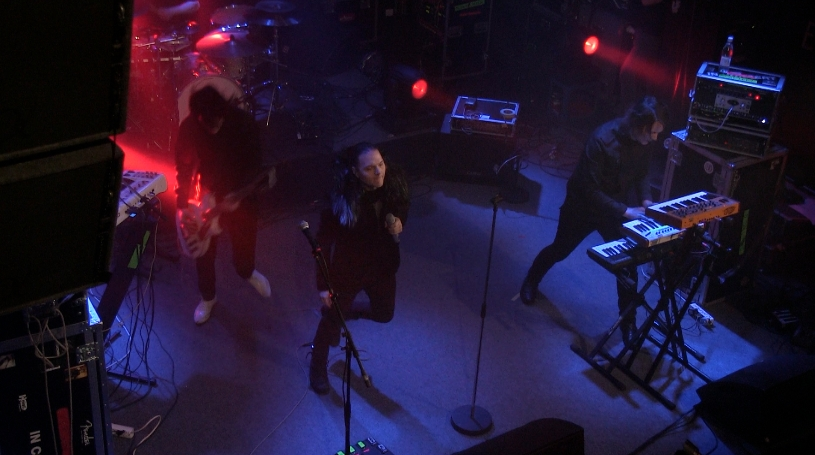
- Jaani Peuhu/Iconcrash, Uuden Musiikin Kilpailu 2012

Background information
- Born: 17 August 1978 (age 47); Anjalankoski, Finland
- Genres: Rock, electronica
- Occupations: Singer, songwriter, producer
- Instruments: Vocals, guitar, drums, piano
- Years active: 1992–present

Jaani Peuhu (born 17 August 1978) is a Finnish musician, producer and songwriter. He is the founder and lead vocalist of the Finnish band Iconcrash. He currently resides in Helsinki.

== Background ==
Peuhu was born in Anjalankoski to a jazz musician father, Kari Peuhu, and a photographer mother, Heli Ahoniitty. At the age of seven, he began his musical career when he started playing the piano; one year later he learned to play the drums. At the age of 13 he formed his first band Chaoslord. He played his first show in Ruovesi one year later at the age of 14.

Peuhu has played drums in several bands including Scarlet Youth, Varjo, Deadbabes, Myyt, Mary-Ann, Billy-Goats, Jalankulkuämpäri, Kinetic and Vuk.

== Career ==
Jaani started his solo career in 2004, when he created his first record as a singer/songwriter under the name Iconcrash. Jaani has also worked in the studio as a producer or guest musician with artists like Before the Dawn, Swallow The Sun, To/Die/For, Thunderstone, Wiidakko and Anna Eriksson.

More recently, he produced Rain Diary's The Lights are Violent Here album, which was voted #1 Alternative debut album for 2013, in a poll held by Levykauppa Äx.

Since Iconcrash's first release Nude (2005) Peuhu has toured with his live band in the UK, Finland, Russia, Germany, Italy, the Baltic States and the US. In September/October 2014, he toured Germany and Finland as part of the 'Finnish Darkwave Tour' along with fellow Artists Rain Diary.

In September 2012 Jaani Peuhu announced his solo career under his own name. He released his album Tear Catcher in January 2015. Apart from the song Maybe God is Asleep all music and lyrics were written by Peuhu. Also, apart from mixing on My Sky the album was produced, engineered and mixed by Peuhu. Prior to the release of Tear Catcher Peuhu released an EP of cover versions in December 2014, entitled Echo Chamber.

He produced Kati Rán's 2024 album Sála. In 2025 he worked with Timo Haakana's band The Fair Attempts on their single Apart.

== Awards ==
2012 Iconcrash's We Are The Night made it is UMK finals (ESC) and in 2009 Jaani Peuhu co-wrote a song called "10,000 Light Years" for the band Kwan with Pauli Rantasalmi of The Rasmus, that made it to the Eurovision Song Contest finals in Finland.

Finnish grammy (Emma) nominees: 2018 Hallatar: No Stars Upon the Bridge (The metal album of the year). 2020 Swallow the Sun: When a shadow is forced into the light (The metal album of the year).

== Discography ==
Mary-Ann

- 1998 MCD: Deeper Sin

Billy-Goats

- 1999 MCD: All These Fears

Jalankulkuämpäri

- 2002 CDS: TIP
- 2003 CDS: 9E
- 2007 album: Koska Olen Hyvä Rouva

Deadbabes

- 2003 MCD: The Drug

Iconcrash

- 2003 promo: Happy?
- 2004 split-EP: Viola loves Iconcrash
- 2005 album: Nude
- 2008 soundtrack: Clive Barker's Midnight Meat Train
- 2008 Mama Trash 2 Compilation
- 2008 soundtrack: Blackout
- 2009 single: Strange, Strange Dark Star
- 2009 single: Everlasting
- 2010 single: Sleeper
- 2010 album: Enochian Devices
- 2011 single: Delete
- 2011 single: Stockholm
- 2011 album: Inkeroinen
- 2012 single: We Are The Night
- 2012 album: Inkeroinen (Special edition including: We Are The Night)

Viola

- 2004 split-EP: Viola loves Iconcrash
- 2005 album: Melancholydisco

Ratas

- 2001 MCD: Kuumaa Laavaa
- 2002 MCD: Ilmaa

Luomakunta

- 2002 album: Alta

Before the Dawn

- 2000 promo: To Desire
- 2001 MCD: Gehenna
- 2002 MCD: My Darkness
- 2003 album: My Darkness
- 2004 album: 4:14 am
- 2005 DVD: The First Chapter

Varjo

- 2000 CDS: Korvaamaton
- 2000 CDS: Maailmanpyörä
- 2000 album: Kuka Korvaa Poistetun Sydämen
- 2001 download single: Tänä Kesänä
- 2003 album: Paratiisissa
- 2009 album: Ensinäytös 1997

Thunderstone

- 2009 album: Dirt Metal

Swallow the Sun

- 2006 album: Hope
- 2006 CDS: Don't Fall Asleep
- 2015 triple album: Songs From The North
- 2018 EP: Lumina Aurea
- 2019 album: When A Shadow Is Forced Into The Light
- 2021 album: 20 Years of Gloom, Beauty and Despair - Live in Helsinki
- 2021 album: Moonflowers

Anna Eriksson

- 2007 album: Ihode
- 2008 album: Annan Vuodet

Scarlet Youth

- 2009 MCD: Breaking The Patterns
- 2010 album: Goodbye Doesn't Mean I'm Gone

Kwan

- 2009 CDS: 10 000 Light Years

Black Sun Aeon

- 2009 MCD: Dirty Black Summer EP

Rain Diary

- 2010 single: Lost
- 2012 album: The Lights Are Violent Here
- 2017 album: Black Weddings

Grendel

- 2011 album: Corrupt To The Core

Wiidakko

- 2011 single: Seis seis seis
- 2011 single: Odessa
- 2011 album: Wiidakko

Hevisaurus

- 2011 album: Räyhällistä Joulua

To/Die/For

- 2011 album: Samsara
- 2014 single: Screaming Birds

Jaani Peuhu

- 2013 single: My Sky
- 2014 single: No Regrets
- 2014 single: Tonight's Music
- 2014 EP: Echo Chamber
- 2015 album: Tear Catcher

Beats and Styles|Beats And Styles

- 2017 single: Still Alive

Hallatar

- 2017 album: No Stars Upon the Bridge

Lord of the Lost

- 2018 album: Thornstar
- 2019 album: Till Death Us Do Part – Best Of
- 2020 album: Swan Songs III
- 2022 album: Blood & Glitter

Aleah

- 2020 album: Aleah

Kati Rán

- 2024 album: Sála
