= The Morning Never Came =

Studio album by Swallow the Sun
- Released: 15 November 2003
- Recorded: July–August 2003
- Studio: Sam's Workshop
- Genres: Death-doom, melodic death metal
- Length: 56:27 (standard version); 62:50 (U.S. & limited double vinyl edition version)
- Labels: Firebox, Olympic
- Producer: Swallow the Sun

Swallow the Sun chronology
Out of This Gloomy Light (2003)	The Morning Never Came (2003)	Ghosts of Loss (2005)

Professional ratings
Review scores
Source	Rating
AllMusic	4/5 stars
Decoymusic.com	4.5/5 stars

The Morning Never Came is the debut studio album by Finnish death-doom band Swallow the Sun, released on November 15, 2003. The album was later released in the United States on February 22, 2005, via Olympic Recordings.

Tracks 1, 3, 4 and 7 are all re-recorded versions from the band's first demo, Out of This Gloomy Light. Track 4 is the first song in the Horror tetralogy that would continue in Hope, New Moon, and Emerald Forest and the Blackbird.

== Track listing ==
No.	Title	Length
1.	"Through Her Silvery Body"	8:40
2.	"Deadly Nightshade"	5:49
3.	"Out of This Gloomy Light"	5:38
4.	"Swallow (Horror I)"	5:23
5.	"Silence of the Womb"	6:51
6.	"Hold This Woe"	8:05
7.	"Under the Waves"	6:47
8.	"The Morning Never Came"	9:19
Total length:		56:27

=== U.S. & limited double vinyl edition bonus track ===
No.	Title	Length
9.	"Solitude" (Candlemass cover)	6:23
Total length:		62:50

== Personnel ==
=== Swallow the Sun ===
- Mikko Kotamäki – vocals
- Markus Jämsen – lead guitar
- Juha Raivio – rhythm guitar; songwriting (1–8)
- Matti Honkonen – bass guitar
- Aleksi Munter – keyboards
- Pasi Pasanen – drums

=== Additional personnel ===
- Flavia Lester – spoken word (5)
- Petteri Kivimäki – photography
- fo2003 – logo
- Tuomo Lehtonen – album cover and layout
- Sami Kokko – recording, engineering and mixing (Sam's Workshop)
- Minerva Pappi – mastering at Finnvox Studios
- Albert Witchfinder – guest vocals (9)

=== Arrangements (9) ===
- Candlemass
  - Johan Längqvist
  - Christian Weberyd
  - Klas Bergwall
  - Leif Edling – songwriting
  - Mats Björkman
  - Mats Ekström
