= Kai Hahto =

Finnish musician and drummer (born 1973)

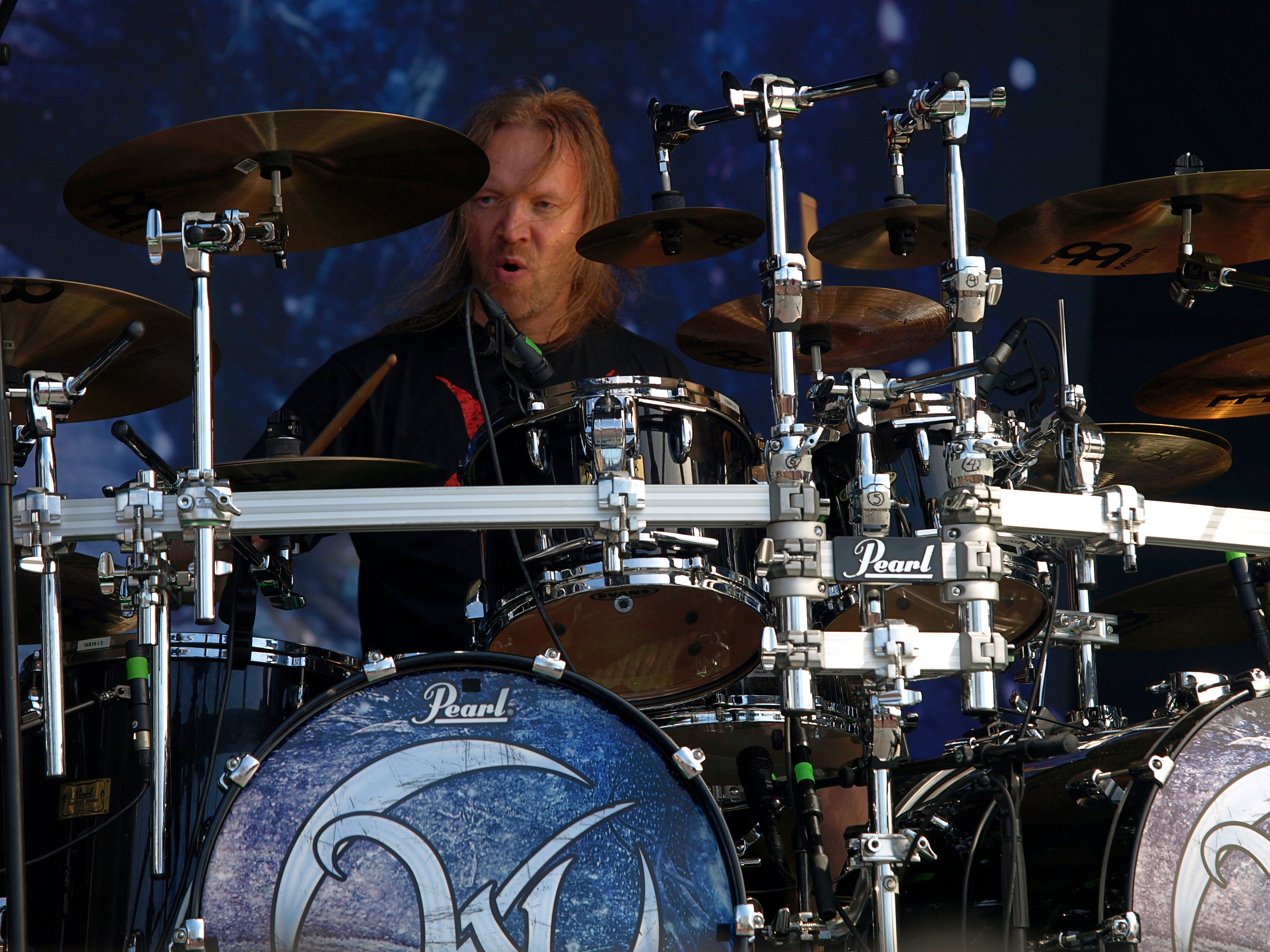
- Hahto performing in 2013

Background information
- Also known as: The Grinder, Dr. K.H., Caer Hallam Generis, K
- Born: 31 December 1973 (age 52); Vaasa, Finland
- Genres: Melodic death metal, folk metal, power metal, grindcore
- Occupation: Musician
- Instruments: Drums, percussion
- Years active: 1993–present
- Member of: Wintersun, Nightwish, Darkwoods My Betrothed
- Formerly of: Rotten Sound

Kai Hahto (born 31 December 1973) is a Finnish musician, best known as the drummer of Wintersun and Nightwish.

== Career ==
In 2002, Hahto went to New York to study jazz drumming.

Hahto was a member of the grindcore band Rotten Sound.

In 2004 Hahto became one of the founders of the band Wintersun and left Rotten Sound later in 2005. In 2009–2012 he played about 300 shows with doom-death-metal band Swallow the Sun as a tour drummer.

Hahto has an endorsement relationship with Sihi cymbals, Pearl drums and hardware, Balbex drumsticks, Roland V-Drums and Finfonic earphones.

On 6 August 2014, it was announced that Hahto would play drums on the Nightwish studio album, Endless Forms Most Beautiful, replacing Jukka Nevalainen who went on hiatus from the band due to insomnia, and Hahto performed on all live shows since that date. On 15 July 2019, Hahto became Nightwish's permanent drummer following Nevalainen's decision not to return to the band.

In December 2020, it was announced that Hahto would be the drummer for the new lineup in Finnish black metal band Darkwoods My Betrothed, who had become active again.

== Discography ==
Band	Year of release	Title	Label
Cartilage	1992	Split album w/ Altar	Drowned Productions
Vomiturition	1995	A Leftover	Invasion Records
Wings	1995	Diatribe	Woodcut Records
Rotten Sound	1995	Sick Bastard	Genet Records
Rotten Sound	1995	Psychotic Veterinarian	S.O.A. Records
Rotten Sound	1996	Loosin' Face	Anomie Records
Enochian Crescent	1997	Telocvovim	Woodcut Records
Rotten Sound	1997	Spitted Alive	I.D.S. Records
Rotten Sound	1997	Under Pressure	Repulse Records
Rotten Sound	1998	Drain	Repulse Records
Rotten Sound	2000	Still Psycho	Necropolis Records
Max on the Rox	2000	Voodoo	Kråklund Records
Rotten Sound	2001	8 Hours of Lobotomy	M.C.R. Records
Rotten Sound	2002	Murderworks	Necropolis Records
Max on the Rox	2002	Rox II	Kråklund Records
Rotten Sound	2003	Seeds of Hate	Cudgel Agency
Rotten Sound	2003	From Crust 'Til Grind	Century Media Records
Wintersun	2004	Wintersun	Nuclear Blast
Max on the Rox	2004	Rhythmic Songs from a Mysterious Red House	Kråklund Records
Rotten Sound	2005	Exit	Spinefarm Records
Swallow the Sun	2009	New Moon	Spinefarm Records
Swallow the Sun	2012	Emerald Forest and the Blackbird	Spinefarm Records
Wintersun	2012	Time I	Nuclear Blast
Nightwish	2015	Endless Forms Most Beautiful	Nuclear Blast
Trees of Eternity	2016	Hour of the Nightingale	Svart Records
Nightwish	2020	Human. :II: Nature.	Nuclear Blast
Auri	2021	II – Those We Don't Speak Of	Nuclear Blast
Darkwoods My Betrothed	2021	Angel of Carnage Unleashed	Napalm Records
Wintersun	2024	Time II	Nuclear Blast
Nightwish	2024	Yesterwynde	Nuclear Blast
