= New Moon (Swallow the Sun album) =

Studio album by Swallow the Sun
- Released: November 4, 2009
- Recorded: 15 June - Mid-July 2009
- Studios: Fascination Street Studios (Örebro, Sweden)
- Genres: Death-doom, melodic death metal, gothic metal
- Length: 53:50
- Labels: Spinefarm, Svart Records
- Producer: Jens Bogren

Swallow the Sun chronology
Plague of Butterflies (2008)	New Moon (2009)	Emerald Forest and the Blackbird (2012)

Professional ratings
Review scores
Source	Rating
Allmusic	3.5/5 stars
Guitarist	4/5 stars
Rock Sound	9/10 stars

New Moon is the fourth studio album by Finnish death-doom band Swallow the Sun. The album was released on November 4, 2009 in Finland, November 9, 2009 in Europe, and November 10, 2009 in the United States. Recording of the album commenced on June 15 at Fascination Street Studios with Jens Bogren as executive producer. Wintersun drummer Kai Hahto replaced Pasi Pasanen and contributed drums on the album. Some versions of the album contain an alternate recording of "Servant of Sorrow", which features a guitar solo by Steve Rothery.

The Horror songs continued from this album which would be Horror Pt. III, and also previously being on The Morning Never Came - Horror I, Hope - Horror Pt. 2, then finally later on Emerald Forest and the Blackbird - Horror Pt IV.

On February 1, 2012, Svart Records released the album on LP, limited to 500 copies.

== Track listing ==
All tracks are written by Juha Raivio, except where noted

No.	Title	Writer(s)	Length
1.	"These Woods Breathe Evil"		6:43
2.	"Falling World"	Mikko Kotamäki, Raivio	5:08
3.	"Sleepless Swans"		7:23
4.	"...And Heavens Cried Blood"	Kotamäki, Raivio	6:17
5.	"Lights on the Lake (Horror Pt. III)"		7:45
6.	"New Moon"		5:00
7.	"Servant of Sorrow"		6:25
8.	"Weight of the Dead"		9:04

=== Bonus track ===
No.	Title	Length
9.	"Servant of Sorrow (Alternate Version)"	6:25

== Charts ==
Chart (2009)	Peak position
Finnish Albums Chart	10

== Personnel ==
=== Swallow The Sun ===
- Mikko Kotamäki - vocals
- Markus Jämsen - guitar
- Juha Raivio - guitar
- Aleksi Munter - keyboards
- Matti Honkonen - bass
- Kai Hahto - drums

=== Additional personnel ===
- Aleah Stanbridge - guest vocals on "Lights on the Lake"
- Dan Swanö - backing vocals on "Falling World"
- Steve Rothery - guitar solo/lead guitar/guitars on "Servant of Sorrow (Alternative Version)"
