= Mieszko Talarczyk =

Swedish musician (1974–2004)

- Also known as: Mierre Mongo
- Born: Mieszko Andrzej Talarczyk; December 23, 1974; Poland
- Died: December 26, 2004 (aged 30) Phi Phi Island, Thailand
- Genres: Death metal, grindcore, hardcore punk
- Occupations: Musician, songwriter, producer
- Instruments: Vocals, guitar, bass
- Label: Relapse
- Formerly of: Genocide Superstars, Krigshot, Nasum
- Website: www.nasum.com

Mieszko Talarczyk (December 23, 1974 – December 26, 2004) was the lead singer and guitarist of the Swedish grindcore band Nasum, Genocide Superstars, and Krigshot. Known for his engineering and production abilities, he co-founded Soundlab studios with Millencolin guitarist Mathias Färm.

In December 2004, Mieszko went on holiday to Thailand with his girlfriend Emma during a break in between albums, and died in the tsunami disaster on December 26, 2004, three days after his 30th birthday. His body was identified on February 16, 2005, and his remains were transported back to his hometown of Örebro, Sweden where his funeral was held on 30 March. Though badly injured, Emma survived. After Mieszko's death, Nasum and Genocide Superstars disbanded permanently.

== Discography ==
=== With Nasum ===
- Inhale/Exhale (1998)
- Human 2.0 (2000)
- Helvete (2003)
- Shift (2004)

=== With Genocide Superstars ===
- Hail The New Storm (1997)
- We Are Born of Hate (1999)
- Iron Cross (2002)

=== With Krigshot ===
- Maktmissbrukare (1999)
- Örebro-Mangel (2002)
