= Timo Rautiainen & Trio Niskalaukaus =

Finnish heavy metal band

- Origin: Jyväskylä, Finland
- Genres: Heavy metal
- Years active: 1997–2006, 2017–present
- Labels: Spinefarm, King Foo
- Past members: Timo Rautiainen; Jarkko Petosalmi; Jari Huttunen; Nils Ursin; Seppo Pohjolainen; Karri Rämö; Arto Alaluusua; Teppo Haapasalo; Valtteri Revonkorpi
- Website: trioniskalaukaus.net

Timo Rautiainen ja Trio Niskalaukaus (fin. "Timo Rautiainen and Trio Neckshot") is a heavy metal band from Finland, formed in 1997. They have released nine albums to date. The group is led by Timo Rautiainen, a former member of Finnish metallers Lyijykomppania.

== History ==
For more than 20 years, Rautiainen made music in the Finnish language. However, when a friend came to him with the idea of making a German spoken album, Rautiainen was very interested. The album produced during this session, In frostigen Tälern ("In Frozen Valleys") (2001), was the first German album by a Finnish act. In 2004, the band released their second album in German, titled Hartes Land ("Hard Land"). The albums in German consist of songs which had already been released in Finnish and later translated.

The band has published several music videos, some of them dedicated to (and filmed with) Finnish military serving under KFOR mission in Kosovo.

A biographical book about Rautiainen and his bands was released in 2003. It was written by Finnish journalist Timo Isoaho.

The band announced that it would be going on break for an indefinite period of time as of December 2004. On 1 November 2006, the band announced that they would be breaking up. Timo Rautiainen went on to pursue a solo career by himself and was eventually joined by the former guitarist Jarkko Petosalmi. He made three albums (Sarvivuori, Loppuun ajettu, En oo keittäny enkä myyny) before creating yet another project named Timo Rautiainen ja Neljäs sektori. This band had essentially the same line-up as they did in Timo's solo career except a new drummer was hired.

After Jarkko urged Timo to reunite with Trio Niskalaukaus several times, Timo decided to play a single concert with the Trio Niskalaukaus lineup using the cover name "Liiton Miehet" in 2016. With the band being less burnt out from excess touring, Timo decided to give Trio Niskalaukaus a new shot.

In 2017, the band indeed did a comeback, releasing a new album ("Lauluja Suomesta", "Songs from Finland" in English) and going on tour. A new biography named "Trio Niskalaukaus" featuring interviews from the band members was released on 17 August 2018, as a follow-up to the first book of the same name and author.

== Artistry ==
The musical influence of the band ranges from Black Sabbath to more modern metal acts. Lyrically, the themes presented in their songs range from global issues (such as global warming, genocide, war and nuclear waste or nuclear weapons left loose) to personal tragedy (such as the death of a loved one, school bullying and suicide), typically in a dark and serious tone.

A visional cue in the band's album art is that no upper case letters are used in any occasion. Their logo is a shovel crossed with a pickaxe, usually both covered with breeze. Also in live shows, the logo is used as backdrop with a skull accompanying the shovel and pickaxe.

== Members ==
=== Current lineup ===
- Timo Rautiainen – vocals, guitar (1997–2006, 2017–present)
- Jarkko Petosalmi – guitar (1998–2006, 2017–present)
- Jari Huttunen – guitar (2002–2006, 2017–present)
- Nils Ursin – bass (1999–2006, 2017–present)
- Aksu Hanttu – drums (2025–present)

=== Former members ===
- Seppo Pohjolainen – backing vocals, drums (1997–2006, 2017–2023)
- Karri Rämö – guitar (1997–2001)
- Arto Alaluusua – bass (1997–1999)
- Teppo Haapasalo – guitar (1997–1998)
- Valtteri Revonkorpi – keyboards (1997)

== Discography ==
=== Albums ===
- Lopunajan merkit ("Signs of End Times") – 1999
- Itku pitkästä ilosta ("Weep will follow from a long delight") – 2000
- In frostigen Tälern ("In Frozen Valleys") – 2001
- Rajaportti ("Bordergate") – 2002
- Rajaportti-platinapainos – 2002 (special edition of Rajaportti including Tiernapojat EP)
- Kylmä tila ("Cold Farm") – 2004
- Hartes Land ("Hard Land") – 2004
- Lauluja Suomesta ("Songs from Finland") – 2017
- Mahdoton yhtälö ("Impossible Equation") – 2020
- Tuomiojärvi ("Lake Tuomiojärvi") – 2025

=== Singles ===
- "Rajaton rakkaus" (Borderless Love) – 2000
- "Surupuku" (Mourning Attire) – 2002
- "Elegia" (Elegy) – 2002
- "Lumessakahlaajat" (Waders in the Snow) – 2002
- "Hyvä ihminen" (Good Man) – 2004
- "Minun oikeus" (My Right) – 2004

=== EPs ===
- Hävetkää! (Shame on You!) – 1997
- Kuilun partaalla (On the Edge of a Shaft) – 2001
- Tiernapojat – 2002

=== Compilations ===
- Tilinteon Hetki (Moment of Truth) – 2004

=== DVDs ===
- DVD – 2003
- Perunkirjoitus (Estate Inventory) – 2009

=== Music videos ===
- "Hyvä päivä" (A Good Day) – 2000
- "Rajaton rakkaus" (Borderless Love) – 2000
- "Nyt on mies!" (Now heres a Man!) – 2001
- "Lumessakahlaajat" (Waders in the Snow) – 2002
- "Kylmä tila" (Cold Farm) – 2004
- "Pitkän kaavan mukaan" – 2017
- "Suomi sata vuotta" (Finland One-Hundred Years) – 2017

== Sources ==
- Timo Isoaho, Matti Riekki: Trio Niskalaukaus (2003 Ranka-kustannus Oy - ISBN 952-99206-0-1)
