= Cain's Offering =

Finnish power metal band

- Origin: Finland
- Genre: Power metal
- Years active: 2008–present
- Labels: Avalon, Frontiers
- Members: Jani Liimatainen; Timo Kotipelto; Jens Johansson; Jonas Kuhlberg; Jani Hurula
- Past members: Jukka Koskinen; Mikko Härkin

Cain's Offering is a Finnish power metal supergroup formed in 2008.

== History ==
Cain's Offering was formed by former Sonata Arctica members Jani Liimatainen and Mikko Härkin, Stratovarius singer Timo Kotipelto, Norther and Wintersun bass player Jukka Koskinen, and drummer Jani Hurula. Their debut album, Gather the Faithful, was released in July 2009 through Japanese label Marquee Inc.. Liimatainen wrote all music and lyrics. On 25 June, the band announced a deal with Frontiers Records, and that their debut album would be released on 28 August in Europe and on 11 September in the USA.

Many fans were asking about a tour, and this is what Liimatainen told "Power of Metal":

So far none, since as you probably know, Timo is very busy with Stratovarius now that they just released Polaris. Hopefully next year we get to do some live shows, as I would love to bring this material to life up on the stage as well.

In June 2014, a new official Cain's Offering Facebook page was created, and Liimatainen mentioned plans to write a new Cain's Offering album by September – according to him, he had four songs almost finished, and four more that he composed with Kotipelto. At least two of them would appear in a Cain's Offering or Stratovarius future album.

On 5 March 2015, the title and tracklist of their second album were announced on the band's official Facebook page. The album is called Stormcrow. The album was released on 15 May 2015 in Europe and on 19 May 2015 in North America. In Japan, the album was planned to be released on 29 April 2015. On 15 April, one month before the European release, the band released a lyric video of the first single, "I Will Build You a Rome". The band surprised-released the title track from the then-forthcoming album on 22 April 2015. Both songs were available for download on iTunes. The band also announced two dates in Japan in 2016.

== Band members ==
=== Current ===
- Timo Kotipelto – lead vocals (2009-present)
- Jani Liimatainen – guitar, backing vocals (2009-present)
- Jani Hurula – drums (2009-present)
- Jonas Kuhlberg – bass (2014-present)
- Jens Johansson – keyboards, piano (2014-present)

=== Former ===
- Jukka Koskinen – bass (2009–2014)
- Mikko Härkin – keyboards, piano (2009–2014)

== Discography ==
- Gather the Faithful (2009)
- Stormcrow (2015)

Music video

- "I Will Build You a Rome" (Lyric Video) (2015)
- "The Best of Times" (2016)
