= Wintersun (disambiguation) =

Wintersun is a melodic death metal band.

Wintersun may also refer to:

- Wintersun (album), the debut album from the aforementioned band
- "Wintersun" (instrumental), a 2001 single by the string quartet Bond
- Undercover: Operation Wintersun, a computer game published by Lighthouse Interactive
