= Wintersun (album) =

2004 studio album by Wintersun

Studio album by Wintersun
- Released: 13 September 2004
- Recorded: January–May 2004 at Sundi Coop Studios; Tico-Tico Studios
- Genre: Melodic death metal, power metal, folk metal, melodic black metal
- Length: 54:08
- Label: Nuclear Blast
- Producer: Jari Mäenpää

Wintersun chronology
Wintersun (2004)	Time I (2012)

Wintersun is the debut studio album by Finnish melodic death metal band Wintersun, then the solo project of Jari Mäenpää. It was released in September 2004. The Japanese edition of the album was released with the original three demo tracks used to obtain a contract with Nuclear Blast.

== Background ==
Wintersun was a project eight years in the making. Jari Mäenpää began writing the music for Wintersun in late 1995, before joining folk metal band Ensiferum in 1996 as lead singer and guitarist. In 1997, Mäenpää served in the Finnish military as part of his national defense duty, during which he contracted tuberculosis. The diagnosis was late, and Mäenpää required surgery to remove part of his lung, hospitalizing him for months. The song "Beautiful Death" would later be inspired by this event.

In 2003, Mäenpää hired Kai Hahto as a session drummer and, after sending newly recorded demos to Nuclear Blast, was offered a record deal. After returning from Ensiferum's Iron recording sessions, Mäenpää began arranging the compositions of the future Wintersun tracks. Despite intending to keep Wintersun as a side project, a scheduling conflict between booked studio time for Wintersun and a tour promoting Iron forced Mäenpää to request time off from the band, which resulted in him being forced to leave Ensiferum.

== Recording and production ==
Several recording studios were used in the making of the album. Kai Hahto's drums were recorded at Tico Tico Studios in January 2004. Vocals and the majority of the guitars and synthesizers were recorded at Sundi Coop Studios in April. Additional synth and guitar solos were recorded at Mäenpää's home on his 16-track.

Mäenpää, used to multi-track recording his music for years, was comfortable performing vocals, guitars, bass, and keyboards on the record.

Lyrically it's quite a personal record, but there's a little bit of fantasy also. Actually, you can understand the songs by many ways and meanings, which is great. But underneath all the metaphors to stars, space, vast and cold winter landscapes, it's all about my personal life: my feelings, emotions, thoughts, dreams, visions and hallucinations. [...] Every song is a highlight and important to me in their own ways. "Beautiful Death" and "Battle Against Time" were therapeutic to write, because they deal with the negative sides of my life and it was good to get those feelings on paper and into music. "Death and the Healing", "Sleeping Stars" and "Sadness and Hate" are very old songs that still live on, so they have sentimental value.

— Jari Mäenpää, MetalEater.com

Nino Laurenne, guitarist for Thunderstone, mixed the album at Sonic Pump Studios. Mastering was done by Mika Jussila at Finnvox Studios. The album was released on 13 September 2004.

== Music and lyrics ==
AllMusic said that the album's music "merges the hyper-fast precision of Yngwie Malmsteen" with the melody of bands indebted to German power metal band Helloween. The site said the album also has "a homegrown passion for folk-styled songwriting", comparing it to Finnish progressive metal band Amorphis." The album also contains elements symphonic music, as well as doom and black metal. Despite being considered a "relatively accessible" entry in extreme metal, each of the album's tracks are longer in duration than the track preceding it.

The lyrics are considered to be an integral part of the album's thematic structure, although they can be interpreted on varying levels, according to Jari Mäenpää.

== Artwork ==
The cover artwork was commissioned from Kristian Wåhlin (who works under the name Necrolord). Mäenpää had already worked with Wåhlin on the artwork for the Ensiferum albums, but Mäenpää was inspired by the work that delved into colder, majestic landscapes, including Emperor's In the Nightside Eclipse and Dissection's Storm of the Light's Bane. In addition to Mäenpää's idea for the cover, Wåhlin was given lyrics to read and samples of music to listen to.

Mäenpää compared the artwork to the song "Death and the Healing": "The man fallen into the snow could represent 'death' [and] 'despair,' and the light between the trees could represent 'home' [or] "birth/healing.'"

== Music video ==
=== Concept ===
The music video for "Beyond the Dark Sun" shows Jari Mäenpää immersed in ice and frost

The video begins with two shots of steel doors opening, revealing Mäenpää thrashing with his guitar in sharp silhouette against a single source of light, fog simulating the cold swirling around him. During the introduction portion of the song, the video cuts quickly between the contemporary band line-up, each member performing solely against a black backdrop: Mäenpää on guitar, Hahto performing on drums, Jukka Koskinen on five-string bass, and Oliver Fokin on rhythm guitar.

The first visual effect is introduced with Mäenpää superimposed over the moon. The moon effect is revisited several times throughout the video, usually with varying backdrops that simulate galaxies, stars, and asteroids. When Mäenpää begins singing in clean voice, the motif of ice is introduced. A plane of white-blue tendrils of frost and frozen smoke separates the singer from the viewer; slight overexposure and pale makeup on Mäenpää's face increases the overall effect of coldness.

The shots cut sharply to Mäenpää quickly stepping into the camera's focal plane, singing with harsh vocals into an upright microphone. Meanwhile, the video continues to cross-cut between the other band members. The music video eventually cuts between each of these established motifs for the remainder of the song, expanding on a few ideas, including the thawing of the frost; several shots of Fokin and Mäenpää playing together, each lit by their own spotlight; shots of Hahto's double mallets hitting the bass drum; and a single, dark shot of the entire band playing together. The final few shots of the video show Mäenpää being blinded by a brilliant beam of light.

=== Production ===
The music video for "Beyond the Dark Sun" was shot over a period of two days, on 3 and 4 July 2004. It was produced and directed by Maurice Swinkels for LowLifeMedia. The official video can be viewed here.

The cameo lighting technique is used almost exclusively to separate the band members from the black background or frosted foregrounds, and, paired with overexposure, is effective at making Mäenpää appear deep within an ice encasing. Two spotlights are used at times to separate band members appearing together.

== Reception ==
Professional ratings
Review scores
Source	Rating
Allmusic	3.5/5 stars
Sputnikmusic	4.5/5 stars
Metal Storm	9.4 stars on a 10 point scale
The Metal Observer	8.5/10 stars
The Metal Crypt	5/5 stars

Eduardo Rivadavia of AllMusic described the band's musicianship as "superb". He called the guitar playing on "Death and the Healing" "jaw-dropping" and finds "Beautiful Death" "stunning (if quite morbid)". His overall impression was one of surprise, making note of the fact that he based his initial impression on the artwork, which "elicit[ed] thoughts of simplistic black metal infused with pagan or anti-Christian messages." Despite these "twists and turns", Rivadavia found the album formulaic at times and rated it 3.5/5.

Mike Stagno, a staff member for Sputnikmusic, rated the album 4.5/5 and called the band "stronger" than Ensiferum. He described the sound as "combining the likes of neoclassical metal, folk metal, power metal, black metal, and melodic death metal". Stagno emphasized the connection between the music and the album's cover artwork, both of which are depicted as "bleak and cold" while retaining a "mystical attractiveness". Stagno's only problem lay with Mäenpää's clean vocals, which were "passive sounding" and weren't "quite as refined" as harsh vocals.

== Track listing ==
All tracks are written by Jari Mäenpää.

No.	Title	Composed	Length
1.	"Beyond the Dark Sun"	1998	2:38
2.	"Winter Madness"	2002	5:08
3.	"Sleeping Stars"	1995–2003	5:41
4.	"Battle Against Time"	2002–2003	7:03
5.	"Death and the Healing"	1996	7:12
6.	"Starchild": 1. "Wanderer of Time"; 2. "Burning Star"; 3. "The Creation"; 4. "The Sea of Stars"; 5. "Finale"	2000–2003	7:54
7.	"Beautiful Death"	2003	8:16
8.	"Sadness and Hate"	1996	10:16
Total length:			54:08

Japanese release bonus tracks
No.	Title	Length
9.	"Winter Madness" (demo)	6:00
10.	"Beyond the Dark Sun" (demo)	2:43
11.	"Death and the Healing" (demo)	6:46
Total length:		69:37

=== Notes ===
- The five sections within "Starchild" are not listed on the back of the album, but the lyrics within the liner notes are segmented with the titles of each "part".
- There is also an early version of "Sadness and Hate" recorded back in 1996 as part of a demo from Jari Mäenpää's former band, Immemorial.

== Personnel ==
Wintersun

- Jari Mäenpää – vocals, guitar, bass, keyboards, producer
- Kai Hahto – drums
- Teemu Mäntysaari − guitar (only on Live & Raw CD)
- Jukka Koskinen − bass (only on Live & Raw CD)

Production

- Ahti Kortelainen – drum engineering
- Tuomo Valtonen – engineer
- Nino Laurenne – mixing
- Mika Jussila – mastering
- Kristian Wåhlin – cover art
- Helgorth – booklet design
- Mario Koivumäki – photography
- Tuomas Tahvanainen – Wintersun logo
