= Stormcrow =

Stormcrow or storm crow may refer to:

- Yellow-billed cuckoo, a species of bird
- Gandalf, also called Stormcrow by Théoden, King of Rohan, in Tolkien's legendarium
- Stormcrow (album), a 2015 album by Cain's Offering
