= Dreams of Endless War =

Studio album by Norther
- Released: 2002
- Recorded: 2001
- Studio: Sundi Coop Studios, Savonlinna
- Genre: Melodic death metal; power metal
- Length: 43:28; 46:30 (with bonus track)
- Label: Spinefarm
- Producer: Tuomo "jäänksmä tälläseks" Valtonen

Norther chronology
Warlord (2000)	Dreams of Endless War (2002)	Mirror of Madness (2003)

Dreams of Endless War is the debut album by the Finnish melodic death metal band Norther. It was released in 2002 by Spinefarm Records. The songs "Victorious One" and "Endless War" are demo songs from Warlord, while the song "Warlord" from the demo was renamed as "Endless War" and are identical tracks. "Released" was released as a single and made into a music video.

== Track listing ==
No.	Title	Lyrics	Music	Length
1.	"Darkest Time"	Tuomas Planman	Petri Lindroos, Kristian Ranta	6:10
2.	"Last Breath"	Lindroos	Lindroos, Ranta	5:01
3.	"Released"	Ranta	Ranta, Lindroos	4:08
4.	"Endless War"	Ranta	Lindroos, Korpas	6:49
5.	"Dream"	Lindroos	Lindroos, Ranta	4:34
6.	"Victorious One"	Lindroos, Ranta	Lindroos, Korpas	5:44
7.	"Nothing Left"	Ranta	Ranta, Lindroos	4:22
8.	"The Last Night"		Planman, Ranta	2:18
9.	"Final Countdown" (Europe cover)	Joey Tempest	Tempest	4:22
10.	"Youth Gone Wild" (Skid Row cover Japanese Bonus Track)	Rachel Bolan	Bolan, Dave Sabo	3:02

== Videography ==
The album features a video for the song "Released", which can be viewed here.

== Credits ==
=== Norther ===
- Petri Lindroos − guitars, vocals
- Kristian Ranta − guitars
- Tuomas Planman − keyboards
- Jukka Koskinen − bass guitar
- Toni Hallio − drums

=== Other ===
- Mixed in 2001 at Finnvox Studios by Mikko Karmila.
- Mastered in 2001 at Finnvox Studios by Mika "Mikä" Jussila.
- Photos by Toni Härkönen.
- Illustration and logo by "tree-dwelling goblin" Janne Pitkänen.
