= Gather the Faithful =

Studio album by Cain's Offering
- Released: 11 September 2009
- Recorded: 2009 in DrumForest Studios, Astia Studio, Studio 57, Cornerstone Studio, Cave Studio and Living Room Glory Studio
- Genre: Power metal
- Length: 45:43
- Label: Avalon (Japan); Frontiers (Europe, USA)
- Producer: Jani Liimatainen

Cain's Offering chronology
| Gather the Faithful (2009) | Stormcrow (2015) |

Gather the Faithful is the debut studio album of Finnish power metal band Cain's Offering, an all-star project started by former Sonata Arctica guitarist Jani Liimatainen. It was recorded in 2009 in different studios in Finland and was released on 22 July 2009 in Japan via Avalon. On the band's website the band stated that they're "right now concentrating on the following European/US release, which most likely will be end of August" and that they're "in negotiations with a well-known label, and will soon be able to announce the deal and tentative release date." The album was mixed by Jimmy Westerlund in Los Angeles, Hollywood and mastered by Eddy Schreyer at Oasis Mastering, Los Angeles, Burbank. On 25 June the band announced that their debut album will be released on 28 August in Europe and on 11 September in the USA by Frontiers Records.

The tracks "Stolen Waters" and "Ocean of Regrets" were written when Liimatainen and Jani Hurula were still members of Paul Di'Anno's touring band.

== Track listing ==
All songs written by Jani Liimatainen.

1. "My Queen of Winter" – 4:15
2. "More Than Friends" – 4:20
3. "Oceans of Regret" – 6:21
4. "Gather the Faithful" – 3:50
5. "Into the Blue" – 4:25
6. "Dawn of Solace" – 4:18
7. "Thorn in My Side" – 4:07
8. "Morpheus in a Masquerade" – 6:51
9. "Stolen Waters" – 4:35
10. "Tale Untold" (bonus track for Japan) – 4:08
11. "Elegantly Broken" – 2:46

== Charts ==
| Chart (2009) | Peak position |
|---|---|
| Finnish Albums Chart | 20 |

== Credits ==
Cain's Offering

- Timo Kotipelto – lead vocals
- Jani Liimatainen – guitars, additional keyboards, backing vocals, programming on all tracks, choir on "More Than Friends"
- Jukka Koskinen – bass
- Mikko Harkin – keyboards
- Jani Hurula – drums

Additional musicians

- Petri Aho, Antti Railio – backing vocals, choir on "More Than Friends"
- Janne Hurme – Choir on "More Than Friends"

== Unreleased track ==
On Jani Hurula's Myspace profile, he uploaded an unreleased track called "13th Disciple" with Jani Liimatainen on vocals rather than Timo Kotipelto.
