= N (album) =

Studio album by Norther
- Released: 13 February 2008
- Recorded: Astia Studios, 2007
- Genres: Melodic death metal; power metal
- Length: 48:47
- Language: English
- Label: Century Media
- Producer: Anssi Kippo

Norther chronology
Till Death Unites Us (2006)	N (2008)	Circle Regenerated (2011)

Professional ratings
Review scores
Source	Rating
Allmusic	3.5/5 stars
Metal Underground	3/5 stars

N is the fifth full-length studio album by Finnish melodic death metal band Norther. The album was released through Century Media Records on 13 February 2008 in Finland, and other dates in February for other parts of Europe. The track "Frozen Angel" from their previous EP, No Way Back, was re-recorded for the album. "We Rock" and "Frozen Angel" have been made into music videos. This is also the last Norther album to have founding member Petri Lindroos on vocal and guitar duties.

== Track listing ==
All songs written by Kristian Ranta, except where noted.

No.	Title	Length
1.	"My Antichrist"	3:24
2.	"Frozen Angel"	4:06
3.	"Down" (Jukka Koskinen)	3:41
4.	"To Hell"	4:07
5.	"Savior" (Petri Lindroos)	5:02
6.	"Black Gold"	3:18
7.	"We Rock" (M: Lindroos; L: Lindroos, Ranta)	3:57
8.	"Always & Never" (Koskinen)	4:34
9.	"Tell Me Why"	3:30
10.	"If You Go"	3:55
11.	"Self-Righteous Fuck"	4:47
12.	"Forever and Ever" (M: Lindroos, Ranta; L: Lindroos)	4:26

Bonus tracks
No.	Title	Length
13.	"C.U.S." (Limited edition bonus track)	3:14
14.	"No Way Back" (Limited edition bonus track)	5:20
15.	"Reach Out" (Limited edition bonus track)	3:38

== Credits ==
=== Band members ===
- Petri Lindroos − lead vocals, guitar
- Kristian Ranta − guitar, clean vocals (on tracks 1, 2, 4, 7, 10, 15)
- Heikki Saari − drums
- Jukka Koskinen − bass, backing vocals
- Tuomas Planman − keyboards, programming

=== Production ===
- Recorded and produced by Anssi Kippo at Astia Studios
- Mixed by Fredrik Nordström at Studio Fredman in Sweden

== Release history ==
Region	Date
Finland	13 February 2008
Austria	22 February 2008
Belgium	22 February 2008
Germany	22 February 2008
Italy	22 February 2008
Luxembourg	22 February 2008
Netherlands	22 February 2008
Switzerland	22 February 2008
Denmark	25 February 2008
France	25 February 2008
Greece	25 February 2008
Norway	25 February 2008
United Kingdom	25 February 2008
Portugal	26 February 2008
Spain	26 February 2008
Hungary	29 February 2008
Sweden	29 February 2008
