= The Forest Seasons =

Studio album by Wintersun
- Released: 21 July 2017
- Studio: Sonic Pump Studios, Helsinki, Finland
- Genre: Melodic death metal, symphonic metal, power metal
- Length: 54:00
- Label: Nuclear Blast
- Producer: Wintersun

Wintersun chronology
Time I (2012)	The Forest Seasons (2017)	Time II (2024)

The Forest Seasons is the third studio album by Finnish melodic death metal band Wintersun. It was released on 21 July 2017 via Nuclear Blast. The band cited Antonio Vivaldi's violin concerto The Four Seasons as an inspiration for the album title.

== Track listing ==
All tracks are written by Jari Mäenpää.

No.	Title	Length
1.	"Awaken from the Dark Slumber (Spring)"; Part I: "The Dark Slumber"; Part II: "The Awakening"	14:40
2.	"The Forest That Weeps (Summer)"	12:18
3.	"Eternal Darkness (Autumn)"; Part I: "Haunting Darkness"; Part II: "The Call of the Dark Dream"; Part III: "Beyond the Infinite Universe"; Part IV: "Death"	14:08
4.	"Loneliness (Winter)"	12:54
Total length:		54:00

== Personnel ==
Credits for The Forest Seasons adapted from liner notes.

=== Band members ===
- Jari Mäenpää – lead vocals, all instruments, samples and orchestrations (Credited as Winter)
- Teemu Mäntysaari – backing vocals, growling shouts, choirs (Credited as Spring)
- Jukka Koskinen – low growling vocals, backing vocals, choirs (Credited as Autumn)
- Kai Hahto – credited, but did not perform on the album (Credited as Summer)

=== Production ===
- Produced by Jari Mäenpää
- Music: Jari Mäenpää
- Lyrics: Jari Mäenpää
- All arrangements by Jari Mäenpää
- Vocals: Jari Mäenpää
- Additional low growling vocals: Jukka Koskinen
- Additional growling shouts: Teemu Mäntysaari
- 3-man Choir on the 'Awaken From The Dark Slumber (Spring)' by Jari Mäenpää, Teemu Mäntysaari and Jukka Koskinen
- Guitars, drums, bass, synthesizers, samples, and orchestrations: Jari Mäenpää
- Engineer: Jari Mäenpää
- Recorded by Jari Mäenpää
- Mixed by Jari Mäenpää
- Mastered by Jari Mäenpää
- Album cover: Gyula Havancsák and Jari Mäenpää (hjules.com)
- Album booklet and photos: Jari Mäenpää
- Wintersun logo: Ritual (nucleart.com)

=== The Forest Expendables Choir on "The Forest That Weeps (Summer)" ===
- Teemu Mäntysaari (Wintersun)
- Jukka Koskinen (Wintersun)
- Heri Joensen (Tyr)
- Markus Toivonen (Ensiferum)
- Jukka-Pekka Miettinen (Kirkkokahvit & Atmosphere Enterprise)
- Mathias Nygård (Turisas)
- Olli Vänskä (Turisas)
- Perttu Vänskä (Scoring Helsinki)
- Jussi Wickström (Turisas)
- Kasper Mårtenson (Turisas)
- Jesper Anastasiadis (Turisas)
- Aleksi Sihvonen (Medicated)
- Daniel Freyberg (Children of Bodom & Naildown)
- Micko Hell (Denigrate & Gloomy Grim)
- Mikko Salovaara
- Mitja Harvilahti (Moonsorrow)

== Charts ==
Chart (2017)	Peak position
Austrian Albums (Ö3 Austria)	20
Belgian Albums (Ultratop Flanders)	124
Belgian Albums (Ultratop Wallonia)	170
Finnish Albums (Suomen virallinen lista)	1
German Albums (Offizielle Top 100)	14
Swiss Albums (Schweizer Hitparade)	16
