= Time II =

Studio album by Wintersun
- Released: 30 August 2024
- Recorded: 2006–2023
- Genres: Melodic death metal, symphonic metal, power metal
- Length: 48:37
- Label: Nuclear Blast

Wintersun chronology
The Forest Seasons (2017)	Time II (2024)

Professional ratings
Review scores
Source	Rating
Chaoszine	5/5
Metal.de	9/10
Powermetal.de	8.5/10
Rock Hard	9/10

Time II is the fourth studio album by Finnish melodic death metal band Wintersun. After numerous delays for 18 years, it was released on 30 August 2024 via Nuclear Blast and marked their first studio release in seven years, following The Forest Seasons in 2017.

The album reached first position on the Official Finnish Charts following its release.

== Background ==
Time I and Time II were initially planned to be one full album tentatively titled Time. As of the commencement of recording in May 2006, frontman Jari Mäenpää stated that the album length would run over 65 minutes, and that it would be a concept album. Furthermore, according to Mäenpää, the album's sound was to be highly intricate. Each song was said to contain about 200 tracks.

On 27 February 2009, Mäenpää announced through Wintersun's official website that the band would cancel all their live appearances, including Bloodstock Open Air and Summer Breeze, in order to make way for the slow progress of the album. On 26 April 2010, Mäenpää announced on the Wintersun message board that "Land of Snow and Sorrow" was completely finished and that the tracks "Storm" and "Silver Leaves" would be done soon. On 17 November 2010, the band members announced on Wintersun's official website that the album was close to being completed for the most part and that the synths and orchestrations might be finished around December 2010/January 2011. Jari intended to start mixing the album afterwards. On 25 December 2010, Jari stated on the Winter Madness message board that "Silver Leaves" was finished except for some orchestrations. On 26 December 2010, Jari stated that three songs are finished and ready for mixing, and that four songs have "bits and pieces" missing, including vocals. On 19 March 2011, Jari announced via the Winter Madness message board that mixing had been put on hold until late summer at the earliest due to various complications, ranging from a lack of 64-bit DAW plugins to noisy nearby construction. Time was eventually announced to be split into two halves and released separately, with the titles of Time I and Time II. Time I was released in 19 October 2012 in Europe and 22 October 2012 in North America.

Production of Time II was then marred with years-long delays for a multitude of reasons, until 12 January 2024, when Wintersun announced on its social media that Time II is "100%" complete. Three days later, on 15 January 2024, the band announced that "the album release will happen in the late summer of 2024, the latest early fall" and a second crowdfunding campaign was also announced. On 9 February, the band revealed the track list and cover art for Time II. On 26 February, the band announced Time II would be released on 30 August.

== Track listing ==
All tracks are written by Jari Mäenpää.

Time II track listing
No.	Title	Length
1.	"Fields of Snow"	4:05
2.	"The Way of the Fire"	10:08
3.	"One with the Shadows"	6:18
4.	"Ominous Clouds"	2:21
5.	"Storm"	12:15
6.	"Silver Leaves"	13:30
Total length:		48:37

== Personnel ==
- Jari Mäenpää − vocals, rhythm guitar, keyboards, programming
- Teemu Mäntysaari − lead guitar
- Jukka Koskinen − bass
- Kai Hahto − drums

== Charts ==
Chart performance for Time II
Chart (2024)	Peak position
Austrian Albums (Ö3 Austria)	9
Finnish Albums (Suomen virallinen lista)	1
German Albums (Offizielle Top 100)	11
Swiss Albums (Schweizer Hitparade)	8
Scottish Albums (Official Charts)	51
UK Album Downloads (Official Charts)	45
UK Independent Albums (Official Charts)	17
UK Rock & Metal Albums (Official Charts)	3
