= Mirror of Madness =

Studio album by Norther
- Released: 2003
- Recorded: 2002
- Studio: Astia Studios
- Genre: Melodic death metal; power metal
- Length: 48:53
- Label: Spinefarm (Finland); Century Media
- Producer: Anssi Kippo

Norther chronology
Dreams of Endless War (2002)	Mirror of Madness (2003)	Death Unlimited (2004)

Mirror of Madness is the second full-length studio album by the Finnish melodic death metal band Norther, released in 2003 by Spinefarm Records. Mirror of Madness features a cover song, "Smash" by punk rock band The Offspring. It also includes the "Mirror of Madness" video but only in the U.S. The bonus tracks, "Frozen Sky" and "Smash" covers, are only for the Japanese version of the album.

The song "Unleash Hell" was released as a single.

The album was rated 4.5 out of 5 by Sputnikmusic.

== Track listing ==
All music is composed by Petri Lindroos, Tuomas Planman and Kristian Ranta, except where noted.

No.	Title	Lyrics	Music	Length
1.	"Blackhearted"	Ranta		4:19
2.	"Betrayed"	Ranta	Lindroos, Planman	4:54
3.	"Of Darkness and Light"	Planman		5:06
4.	"Midnight Walker"	Lindroos, Ranta		4:45
5.	"Cry"	Planman	Lindroos, Planman	4:58
6.	"Everything Is an End"	Jukka Koskinen		4:33
7.	"Unleash Hell"	Ranta, Planman		4:15
8.	"Dead"	Koskinen		5:27
9.	"Mirror of Madness"	Lindroos		4:42
10.	"Frozen Sky" (Japanese Bonus Track)		Planman, Ranta	3:18
11.	"Smash" (The Offspring Cover) (Japanese Bonus Track)	Dexter Holland	Holland	2:40

== Credits ==
=== Band members ===
- Petri Lindroos − guitars, vocals
- Kristian Ranta − guitars
- Tuomas Planman − keyboards
- Jukka Koskinen − bass
- Toni Hallio − drums

=== Production ===
- Mixed in 2003 at Finnvox Studios by Mikko Karmila and mastered by Mika Jussila
