= Time I =

Studio album by Wintersun
- Released: 19 October 2012
- Recorded: 2 May 2006 – July 2012 at Sonic Pump Studios, Helsinki
- Genre: Symphonic metal, melodic death metal, power metal
- Length: 40:06
- Label: Nuclear Blast

Wintersun chronology
Wintersun (2004)	Time I (2012)	The Forest Seasons (2017)

Professional ratings
Review scores
Source	Rating
About.com	4.5/5 stars
Allmusic	3/5 stars
Sputnikmusic	3.5/5 stars
Metal Storm	7.5/10 stars
MetalUnderground	4.5/5 stars
Heavy Blog Is Heavy	4/5 stars

Time I is the second studio album by Finnish melodic death metal band Wintersun. It was originally scheduled for release in November 2006, but was delayed several times before eventually being released on 19 October 2012 via Nuclear Blast.

== Background ==
As of the commencement of recording, Jari Mäenpää stated that the album length would run over 65 minutes, and that it would be a concept album. Furthermore, according to Mäenpää, the album's sound was to be highly intricate. Each song was said to contain about 200 tracks.

The album's complexity was one of the main reasons for its slow production process. As of April 2007, drums, bass and all the guitars had been recorded. Kai Hahto stated on the official site that due to studio intervention, progress was being made, but also announced that they would not be giving any more release dates at that time, so as not to disappoint fans if they were not met.

As a teaser for the upcoming album, Wintersun ended their Metalcamp 2008 set with a 15-second preview of "Sons of Winter and Stars".

On 27 February 2009, Mäenpää announced through Wintersun's official website that the band would cancel all their live appearances, including Bloodstock Open Air and Summer Breeze, in order to make way for the slow progress of the album.

On 26 April 2010, Mäenpää announced on the Wintersun message board that "Land of Snow and Sorrow" was completely finished and that the tracks "Storm" and "Silver Leaves" would be done soon.

On 17 November 2010, the band members announced on Wintersun's official website that the album was close to being completed for the most part and that the synths and orchestrations might be finished around December 2010/January 2011. Jari Mäenpää intended to start mixing the album afterwards.

On 25 December 2010, Mäenpää stated on the Winter Madness message board that "Silver Leaves" was finished except for some orchestrations. On 26 December 2010, Mäenpää stated that three songs are finished and ready for mixing, and that four songs have "bits and pieces" missing, including vocals.

On 19 March 2011, Mäenpää announced via the Winter Madness message board that mixing had been put on hold until late summer at the earliest due to various complications, ranging from a lack of 64-bit DAW plugins to noisy nearby construction.

On 16 March 2012, Mäenpää announced via Wintersun's official website that Time was nearly finished and would be released in late summer of 2012.

Two months later, on 25 May 2012, Wintersun announced that Time was to be split into two halves and released separately, with the titles of Time I and Time II. At the time, the mixing process of Time I was underway and scheduled to be finished around July 2012. The first album was released in October 2012

A studio trailer was posted to the Nuclear Blast YouTube channel on 4 July 2012, revealing the release date of Time I to be 19 October 2012 in Europe and 22 October 2012 in North America.

On 17 October 2012, the album was made available for streaming on the band's website.

Time II was tentatively planned for release at an unknown date in 2013, but had suffered many delays and was not released until 30 August 2024.

== Music ==
Concerning the album and potential Japanese influence, Jari Mäenpää stated in a 2004 interview, "Right now I'm exploring some Japanese style melodies, so beautiful and magical. You can probably hear some in the next album." The introduction track is confirmed to have Japanese influence.

== Track listing ==
All tracks are written by Jari Mäenpää.

Standard & deluxe edition – disc 1
No.	Title	Length
1.	"When Time Fades Away" (instrumental)	4:07
2.	"Sons of Winter and Stars"; I. "Rain of Stars"; II. "Surrounded by Darkness"; III. "Journey Inside a Dream"; IV. "Sons of Winter and Stars"	13:31
3.	"Land of Snow and Sorrow"	8:21
4.	"Darkness and Frost"	2:23
5.	"Time"	11:44
6.	"Sons of Winter and Stars (Acapella)" (limited edition bonus hidden track^{1})	3:50
Total length:		43:56

^{1} Limited edition contains a hidden track (03:50) after the last track. This contains a cappella parts reminiscent of the hidden track on the limited editions of the first two Ensiferum albums.

Deluxe edition – disc 2 (instrumental)
No.	Title	Length
1.	"When Time Fades Away"	4:08
2.	"Sons of Winter and Stars"; I. "Rain of Stars"; II. "Surrounded by Darkness"; III. "Journey Inside a Dream"; IV. "Sons of Winter and Stars"	13:31
3.	"Land of Snow and Sorrow"	8:21
4.	"Darkness and Frost"	2:23
5.	"Time"	11:44
Total length:		40:06

== Personnel ==
- Jari Mäenpää − vocals, guitar, computer, keyboard programming
- Teemu Mäntysaari − guitar, backing vocals
- Jukka Koskinen − bass, backing vocals
- Kai Hahto − drums
