= Arthemesia =

Finnish black metal band

- Devs Iratvs album cover

Background information
- Origin: Finland
- Genre: Melodic black metal
- Years active: 1994–2010
- Website: arthemesia.blackmetal.fi

Arthemesia was a Finnish melodic black metal band active from 1994 to 2010. The name derives from Artemisia absinthium, Latin for wormwood, thought to have spiritual qualities. Their music projects the band's philosophy of glorifying the occult and Satanism, but also nature and Shamanism.

The band was formed in 1994 as Celestial Agony by vocalist Valtias Mustatuuli and guitarist Routa, but did not record their first demo until 1998, by which time the band included Jari "Arbaal" Mäenpää (guitar), Jukka-Pekka Miettinen (bass), and Oliver Fokin (drums).

The band's first album, Devs Iratvs, was compiled from several demos recorded prior to its release in 2001. A first proper studio album, ShamaNatahs, was released in 2004. Mäenpää left to form Wintersun.

== Former members ==
- Valtias Mustatuuli – vocals
- Jukka-Pekka Miettinen (Mor Voryon) – guitars, keyboards, backing clean vocals (ex-Ensiferum)
- S.M. NekroC – guitars
- Magistra Nocte – keyboards, backing vocals
- Erzebeth Meggadeath – drums (see Moonsorrow)
- Routa – guitars, keyboards (Finntroll)
- Kimmo Miettinen (Mor Vethor) – drums (ex-Cadacross, ex-Ensiferum)
- Jari Mäenpää (Arbaal) – guitars, keyboards, vocals (see Wintersun, ex-Ensiferum)
- Kai Hahto (Dr. KH) – drums (see Wintersun, Swallow the Sun, ex-Rotten Sound)
- Janne Leinonen (G'thaur) – bass (see Barathrum)
- Oliver Fokin – drums (ex-Ensiferum)
- Aconitum – bass

== Discography ==
=== Demos ===
- Demo '98 (1998)
- The Archaic Dreamer (1999)
- Promon02AB (2002)
- ShamaNatahS (2006)
- The Hyperion Elements (2007)

=== Albums ===
- Devs Iratvs (February 2001)
- a.O.a. (March 2009)
