= Mendor =

Finnish health technology company

Mendor was a Finnish health technology company from Helsinki specialising in diabetes care solutions. The company's headquarters was located in the business district of Keilaniemi in Espoo, Finland. Mendor filed for bankruptcy in January 2017.

== Products ==
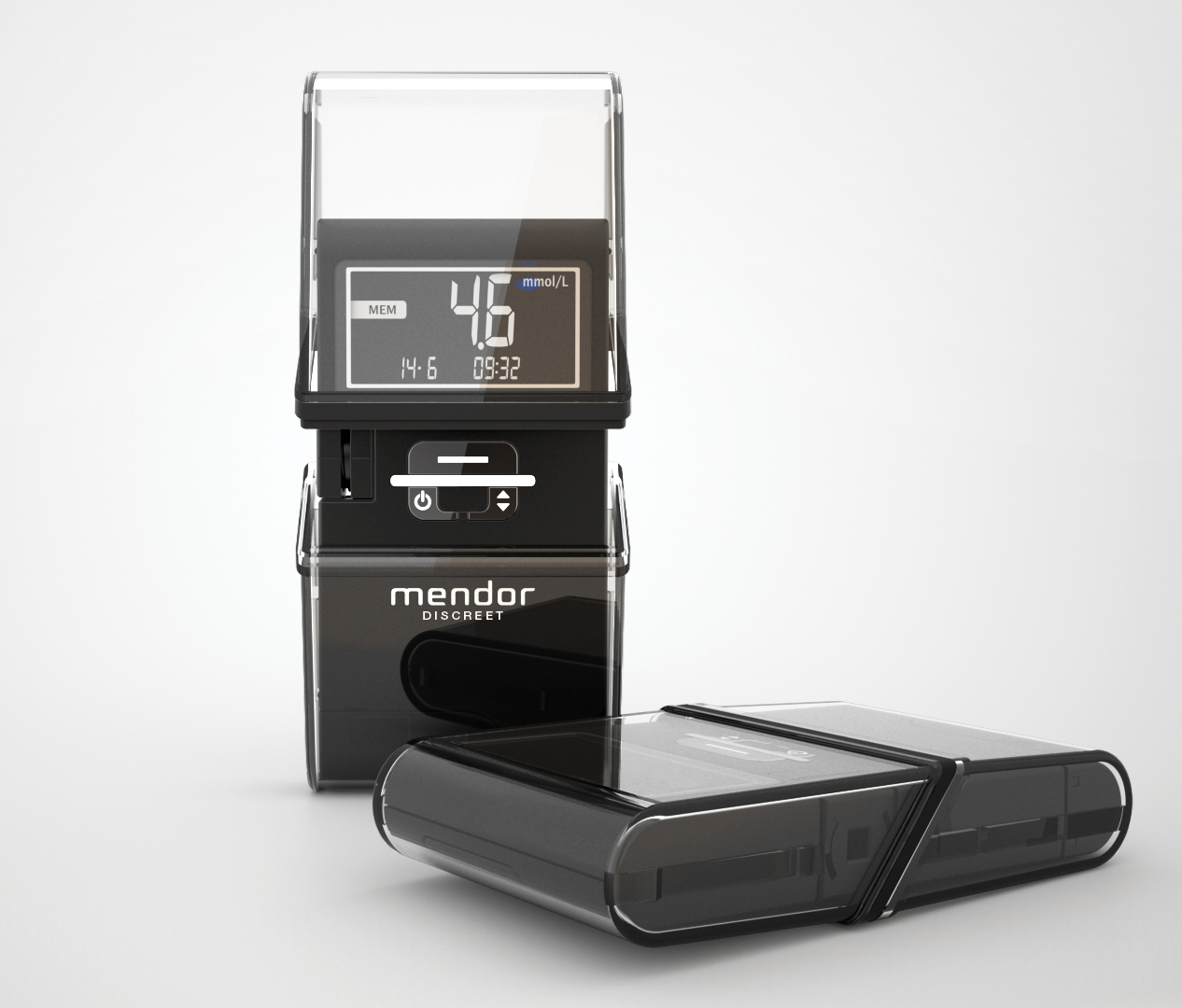
Mendor Discreet, all-in-one blood glucose meter

The company has introduced a device named Mendor Discreet, a self-contained blood glucose meter. It allows users to upload and analyze results online using software known as Balance.

== History ==
Mendor was founded in December 2005 by Jukka Planman, Tuomas Planman, Henri Andell, Juho Konsti and Kristian Ranta, after a successful entry in the national business plan competition Venture Cup. It was a portfolio company of Finnish early stage venture capital fund Veraventure and was voted as the most attractive company for venture capital investment amongst Finnish start-up companies.

Tech Tour, a European wide, independent non-profit organization committed to the development of emerging technology companies, selected Mendor as one of the top 30 most promising high growth Nordic technology companies. Mendor was also granted the Innosuomi / Uusimaa award in 2010.

In 2011, Red Herring, an international technology publication, selected Mendor for the TOP 100 list of European growth companies.

In 2012, Mendor announced an international partnership in Great Britain with Merck Serono. TiE50, a US-based global organization that tracks technology growth companies, awarded Mendor with the Technology Award for Innovation.

In 2017 the company filed for bankruptcy.
