= Circle Regenerated =

Studio album by Norther
- Released: 18 April 2011
- Recorded: Astia Studios, 2010
- Genres: Melodic death metal; power metal
- Length: 43:55
- Language: English
- Label: Century Media
- Producer: Anssi Kippo

Norther chronology
N (2008)	Circle Regenerated (2011)

Professional ratings
Review scores
Source	Rating
Time for Metal	9/10 stars
Metal Storm	3/10 stars

Circle Regenerated is the sixth and final full-length studio album by Finnish melodic death metal band Norther. The album was released through Century Media Records on 30 March in Japan, on 13 April in Finland, on 15 April in Germany, Austria, Switzerland and Norway, and on 18 April in the rest of Europe. The United States release followed on 19 April, and Australia and New Zealand on 22 April. The track "Break Myself Away" was previously released through their website as a free digital download. The album charted at number five on the Official Finnish Chart.

This is the band's only album to feature Aleksi Sihvonen and Daniel Freyberg as full-members of the band.

== Track listing ==
All lyrics are written by Aleksi Sihvonen, except where noted.

No.	Title	Lyrics	Music	Length
1.	"Through It All"		K. Ranta	3:48
2.	"The Hate I Bear"	K. Ranta	K. Ranta	4:06
3.	"Truth"		A. Sihvonen	4:04
4.	"Some Day"		K. Ranta	4:49
5.	"Break Myself Away"		D. Freyberg	4:06
6.	"Believe"		J. Koskinen	4:23
7.	"Falling"	K. Ranta	K. Ranta	4:21
8.	"We Do Not Care"		D. Freyberg	4:16
9.	"The Last Time"		K. Ranta	4:16
10.	"Closing In"		J. Koskinen, D. Freyberg	5:49

Limited edition bonus tracks
No.	Title	Length
11.	"New Beginning (Instrumental) (Music: K. Ranta)"	3:37
12.	"Hear You Call My Name (Acoustic) (Music: K. Ranta; Lyrics: K. Ranta)"	3:18
13.	"Bimbo" (Lambretta cover)	3:30

== Credits ==
=== Band members ===
- Aleksi Sihvonen − lead vocals
- Kristian Ranta − guitar, clean vocals
- Daniel Freyberg − guitar, backing vocals
- Heikki Saari − drums
- Jukka Koskinen − bass, backing vocals
- Tuomas Planman − keyboards, programming

=== Production ===
- Recorded and produced by Anssi Kippo at Astia Studios

== Release history ==
Region	Date
Japan	30 March 2011
Finland	13 April 2011
Germany	15 April 2011
Austria	15 April 2011
Norway	15 April 2011
Switzerland	15 April 2011
United Kingdom	18 April 2011
Portugal	18 April 2011
France	18 April 2011
Greece	18 April 2011
Denmark	18 April 2011
Spain	19 April 2011
Italy	19 April 2011
United States	19 April 2011
Canada	19 April 2011
Sweden	20 April 2011
Hungary	20 April 2011
Australia	22 April 2011
New Zealand	22 April 2011
