= Till Death Unites Us =

Studio album by Norther
- Released: 25 January 2006
- Recorded: July–September 2005
- Studios: Studio Fredman, Gothenburg
- Genres: Melodic death metal; power metal
- Length: 46:04; 64:34 (with bonus tracks)
- Labels: Spinefarm (Finland); Universal (U.S.)
- Producer: Fredrik Nordström

Norther chronology
Death Unlimited (2004)	Till Death Unites Us (2006)	N (2007)

Till Death Unites Us is the fourth full-length studio album by the Finnish melodic death metal band Norther. It was released on 25 January 2006 through Spinefarm Records. This release marks their first studio album to not include a cover song in any of its releases. The song "Scream" was released as a CD single.

== Track listing ==
All tracks are written by Kristian Ranta, except where noted.

No.	Title	Lyrics	Music	Length
1.	"Throwing My Life Away"	Jukka Koskinen	Koskinen	3:08
2.	"Drowning"		Petri Lindroos, Ranta	3:47
3.	"Norther"	Lindroos	Lindroos	3:41
4.	"Everything"	Lindroos	Lindroos	4:32
5.	"Evil Ladies"			3:37
6.	"Omen"	Koskinen		4:27
7.	"Scream"			4:19
8.	"Fuck You"	Lindroos	Lindroos	2:03
9.	"Alone In the End"			4:09
10.	"Die"	Tuomas Planman		3:23
11.	"Wasted Years"			5:01
12.	"The End of Our Lives"	Koskinen		3:54

Japanese bonus tracks
No.	Title	Length
1.	"Day Zero"	3:11
2.	"YDKS (You Don't Know Shit)"	3:44
3.	"Hellhole"	3:45
4.	"Thorn"	3:32
5.	"Chasm" (Remix)	4:18

(These tracks are taken from Solution 7.)

== Personnel ==
=== Norther ===
- Petri Lindroos − lead vocals, guitar
- Kristian Ranta − guitar, clean vocals (on tracks 6, 9, 11)
- Toni Hallio − drums
- Jukka Koskinen − bass
- Tuomas Planman − keyboards, synthesizers

=== Production ===
- Recorded and mixed at Studio Fredman in Gothenburg from July to September 2005
- Mastered at Cutting Room Studios, Stockholm in September 2005 by Björn Engelmann
- Design and illustrations by Killustrations.com

== Charts ==
Chart (2006)	Peak position
Finnish Albums (Suomen virallinen lista)	6

Singles
Year	Single	Position
2006	"Scream"	3
