= Death Unlimited =

Studio album by Norther
- Released: 3 March 2004
- Recorded: Astia Studio A from August–September 2003
- Genres: Melodic death metal; power metal
- Length: 51:06; 56:05 (bonus track)
- Label: Spinefarm (Finland)
- Producer: Anssi Kippo

Norther chronology
Mirror of Madness (2003)	Death Unlimited (2004)	Till Death Unites Us (2005)

Death Unlimited (with Faux Cyrillic and Capitals: DEДTH UИLІMITED) is the third full-length studio album by the Finnish melodic death metal band Norther. It was released on 3 March 2004 through Spinefarm Records. The Japanese release of Death Unlimited and the Spreading Death CD single features a cover song, "Tornado of Souls" by Megadeth. The song "Death Unlimited" is featured on the Spreading Death CD single and its video on the DVD single.

== Track listing ==
No.	Title	Lyrics	Music	Length
1.	"Nightfall"		Petri Lindroos, Kristian Ranta	0:45
2.	"Deep Inside"	Ranta	Lindroos, Tuomas Planman, Ranta	3:25
3.	"Death Unlimited"	Lindroos	Lindroos, Ranta	4:38
4.	"Chasm"	Jukka Koskinen	Lindroos, Planman, Ranta	4:16
5.	"Vain"	Koskinen	Koskinen, Planman	4:34
6.	"A Fallen Star"	Planman	Lindroos, Planman, Ranta	5:30
7.	"The Cure"	Ranta	Lindroos, Planman, Ranta	4:43
8.	"Day of Redemption"	Ranta	Lindroos, Planman, Ranta	6:35
9.	"Beneath"		Planman, Ranta	2:24
10.	"Hollow"	Planman	Lindroos, Planman, Ranta	3:51
11.	"Nothing"	Lindroos	Lindroos, Planman	5:57
12.	"Going Nowhere"	Ranta	Lindroos, Planman, Ranta	4:22
13.	"Tornado of Souls" (Megadeth cover, Japanese bonus track)	David Ellefson, Dave Mustaine	Mustaine	4:59

== Videography ==
The album features a video for the song "Death Unlimited".

== Credits ==
=== Band ===
- Petri Lindroos − lead vocals, guitar
- Kristian Ranta − guitar, clean vocals (on tracks 4 & 6)
- Toni Hallio − drums
- Jukka Koskinen − bass, backing vocals
- Tuomas Planman − keyboards, synthesizers

=== Production and other ===
- Engineered by Anssi Kippo, assisted by T. Auvinen.
- Arranged by Norther and Anssi Kippo.
- Intro and instrumental produced and recorded by Kristian Ranta and Tuomas Planman.
- Guitars and keyboards on "Tornado of Souls" produced by Norther.
- All acoustic guitars by Kristian Ranta.
- Mixed in November 2003 at Finnvox Studios by Mikko Karmila.
- Mastered in November 2003 at Finnvox Studios by Mika Jussila.
- Design by Miikka Tikka.
- Photos by Riku Isohella.
- Shout choir on "Deep Inside", "Death Unlimited", "Hollow" and "Tornado of Souls" by Pete, Jukkis, Kride, Tunkki and Vesseli.
