= Kristian Ranta =

Finnish guitarist

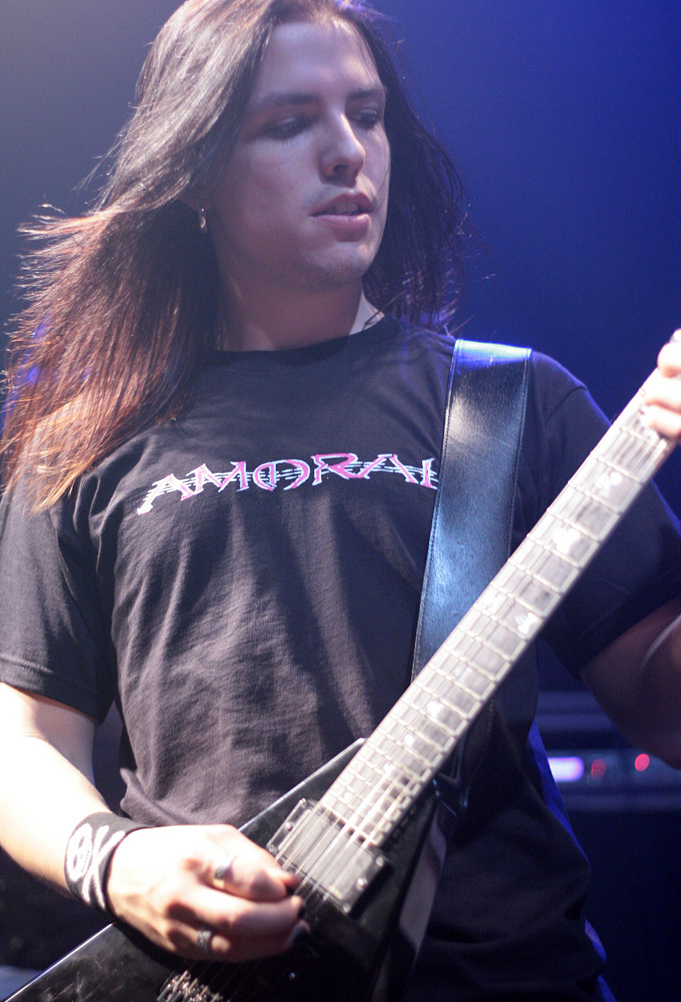
- Ranta with Norther in 2007

Background information
- Also known as: Kride
- Born: 13 May 1981 (age 44); Helsinki, Finland
- Origin: Vihti, Finland
- Genres: Melodic death metal, power metal
- Occupation(s): Musician, songwriter
- Instrument(s): Guitar, vocals
- Years active: 2000–2012
- Formerly of: Norther
- Website: northerband.net

Kristian Ranta (born 13 May 1981), also known as Kride, is a Finnish former musician. He was a guitarist and vocalist for the melodic death metal band Norther until their breakup in 2012.

== Career ==
Ranta composed most of Norther's best-known songs, including "Frozen Angel", and is also credited for renaming the band, which was originally called Requiem. He played guitar on all the band's full-length albums, the most recent being Circle Regenerated (2011), and contributed clean vocals to the Solution 7 EP, Till Death Unites Us, the No Way Back EP, and N.

He also formed an experimental side project named Gashouse Garden with Children of Bodom drummer Jaska Raatikainen.

Ranta acted, along with his bandmates, in a Finnish film called Vares 2. Norther and Ranta also composed a title track for this film called Frozen Angel, for which a music video, featuring images of the movie, was made. He was also interviewed in a TV documentary about Finnish heavy metal bands – Promised Land of Heavy Metal (2009).

=== Entrepreneurial work ===
Ranta was a co-founder and CEO of a Finnish diabetes technology company called Mendor until he left the company in November 2015. Later in 2015, he co-founded a company called Blooming to work on stress reduction at workplaces. Blooming was featured in TechCrunch in March 2016. Ranta was also featured in the biggest newspaper in Finland, Helsingin Sanomat, in the summer of 2016.

With the lead of Ranta as its CEO, Blooming changed its name in 2016 to Meru Health and focused on building a digital treatment solution for depression and anxiety. In 2018, Meru Health was accepted to a startup accelerator in Silicon Valley called Y Combinator and has appeared on number of mainstream media publications such as TechCrunch, INC, and MobiHealthNews.

In 2018, Ranta started his own featured blog on Forbes.

== Equipment ==
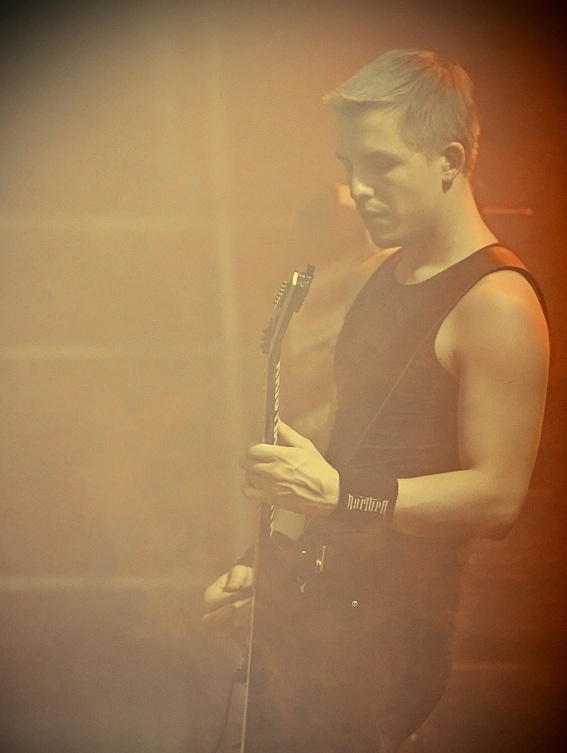
Ranta performing in 2009

- Ranta, along with the rest of Norther, was sponsored by Jackson Guitars and Guild Guitar Company.
- Amfisound Custom. This guitar was created during the short time Norther was endorsed by Amfisound.
- Jackson RR Custom (24 frets, skull and crossbones inlays, EMG-81 bridge and EMG-85 neck pickups) used prior to getting Amfisound custom.
- Jackson KV2, Snow white with black bevels.
- Guild GAD-30PCE
- Black Jim Dunlop Jazz III picks
- Marshall EL34 50/50 Power Amp and Digitech GSP 1101 pre-amp / multieffect
- DR 11-52 set strings in D tuning
- Ranta uses Steinberg Cubase for recording

== Discography ==
=== Norther ===
- Circle Regenerated (2011)
- N (2008) – CD
- No Way Back EP (2007) – EP
- Till Death Unites Us (2006) – CD
- Scream (2006) – CD Single
- Solution 7 EP (2005) – EP
- Spreading Death (2004) – DVD Single
- Death Unlimited (2004) – CD
- Spreading Death (2004) – CD Single
- Mirror of Madness (2003) – CD
- Unleash Hell (2003) – CD Single
- Dreams of Endless War (2002) – CD
- Released (2002) – CD Single
- Warlord (2000) – Demo

=== Gashouse Garden ===
- Untitled three-track demo
