= Jari Mäenpää =

Finnish heavy metal musician

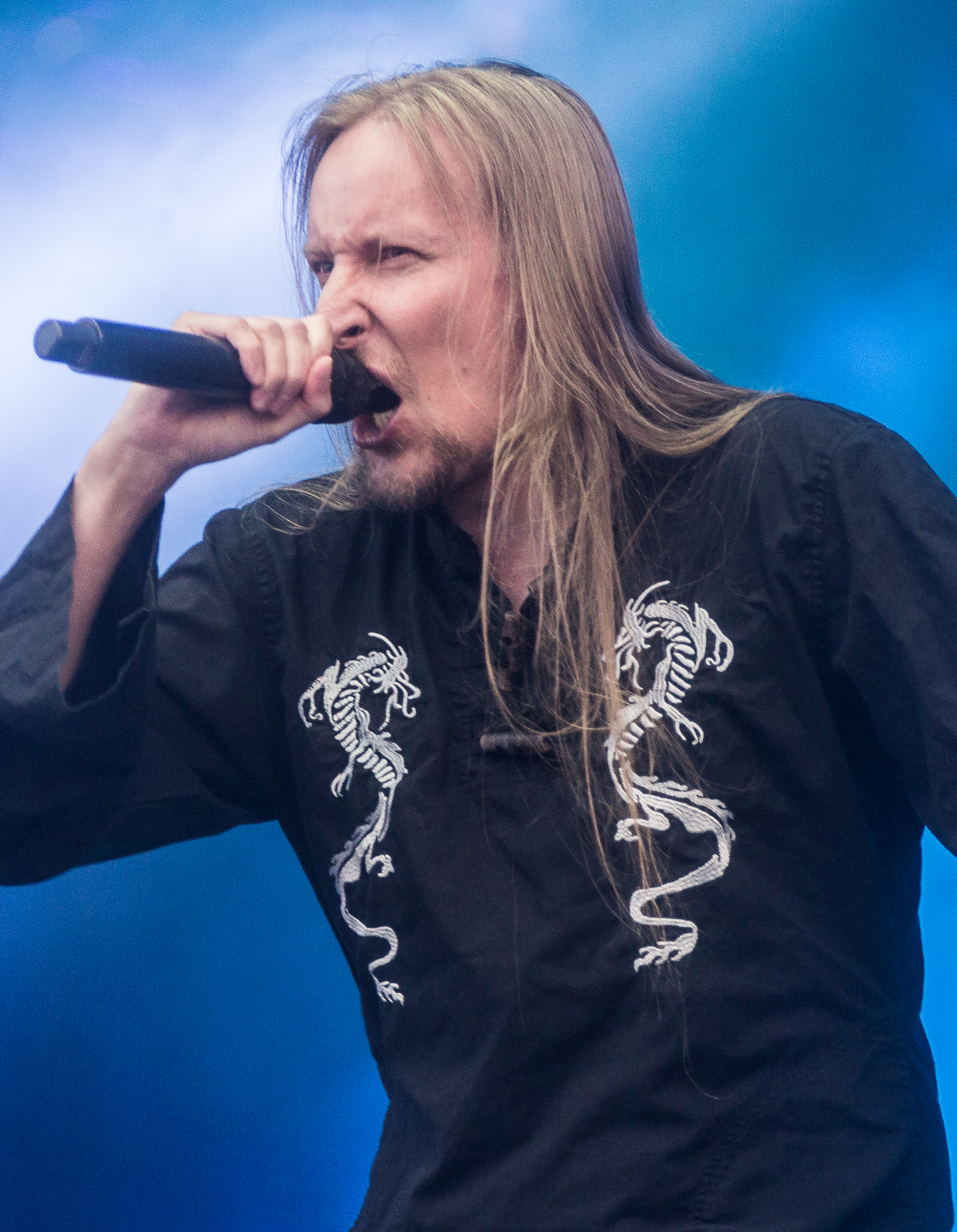
- Mäenpää with Wintersun in 2019

Background information
- Born: 23 December 1977 (age 48); Helsinki, Finland
- Genres: Melodic death metal, power metal, symphonic metal, folk metal
- Occupations: Singer, musician, songwriter
- Instruments: Vocals, guitar, keyboards, bass
- Years active: 1997−present
- Member of: Wintersun
- Formerly of: Ensiferum, Arthemesia, Immemorial

Jari Mäenpää (born 23 December 1977) is a Finnish singer, guitarist, multi-instrumentalist and songwriter. He is the founder of the melodic death metal band Wintersun for which he sings and records the majority of instruments except the drums. Before forming Wintersun, Mäenpää was also known for his role in the folk metal band Ensiferum, which he joined in 1996 after leaving his prior band named Immemorial. Wintersun was initially planned as a parallel project alongside Ensiferum, but in January 2004 he was forced to leave Ensiferum due to clashes between their touring schedule and the studio recording time he had booked for Wintersun.

In 1997, Mäenpää had to put his musical career on hold to take part in Finland's compulsory military service. In an interview, Mäenpää admitted he disliked the time he spent in the military and suspects it's where he acquired tuberculosis.

Jari was also a member of the band Arthemesia, and participated in Kimmo Miettinen's side project Lost Alone.

== Writing style ==
I have a little bit of a mournful, melancholic, majestic or kind of "spacy" way of writing when it comes to melodies. Although everything is not melancholic, but rather "heroic" like you said, but I don't know if it's the right word to describe it. It's difficult to find adjectives to describe the feeling of my own music – it's just me. When I wrote songs to Ensiferum (few songs like "Lai Lai Hei and "Token of Time"), I first needed to get into that "folk mood", before the music came out of me. Wintersun's music just comes out naturally. I don't mean to write certain things. It just happens, I guess.

Jari's style of guitar playing utilizes tremolo-picked melodies and phrases and the heavy use of extremely fast sweep-picking solos and breaks as heard on most of the songs. The speed of Wintersun's music is due in part to the use of blast beats and quick, spacey keyboard lines. This gives the guitar a charging, power metal feel for the most part.

== Notable instruments ==
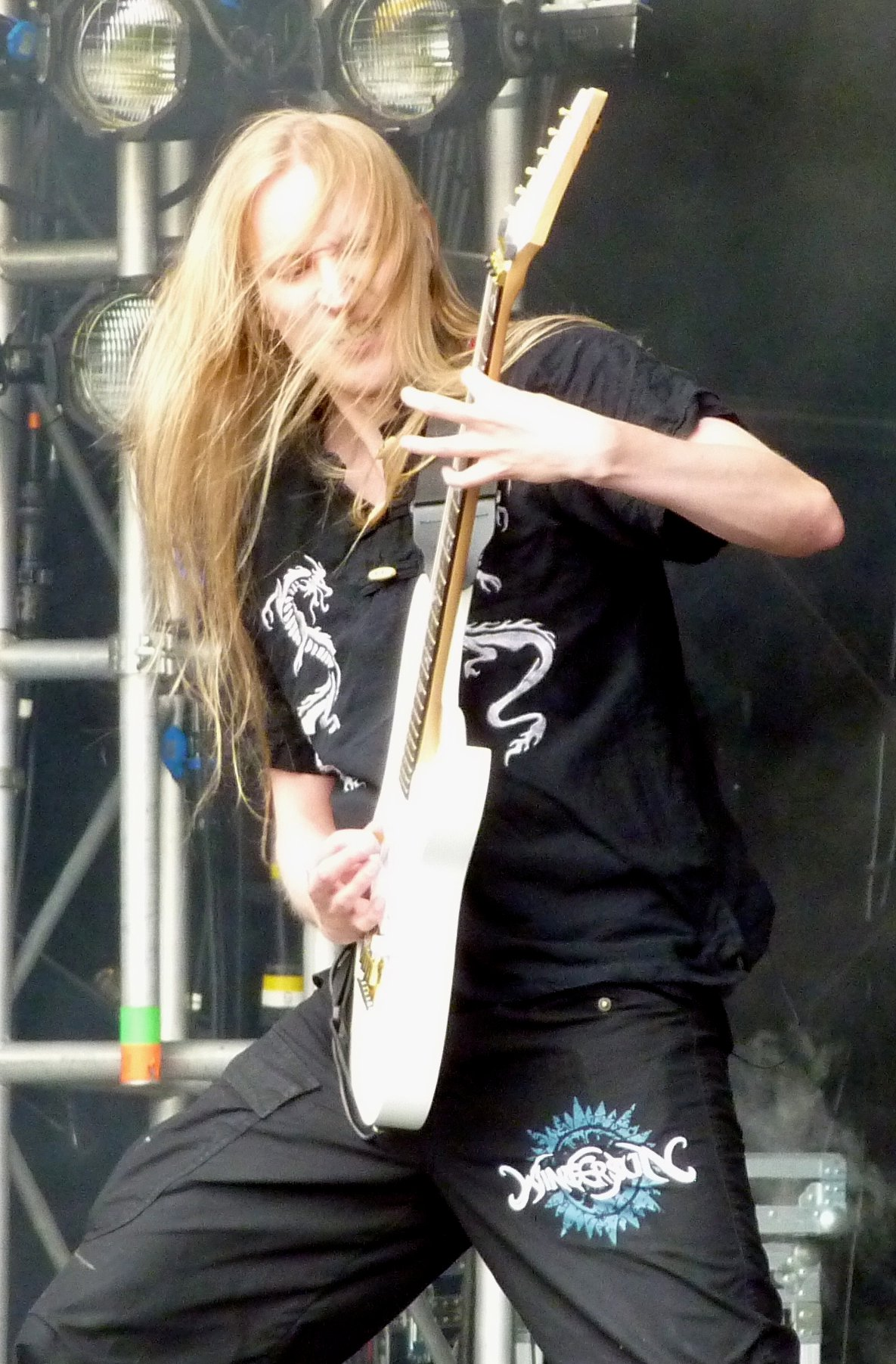
Mäenpää at Bloodstock Open Air 2011

- Tokai Telecaster
- Ibanez RGD(25½ scale)Custom
- Ibanez RGD(26½ scale)Prototype
- Ibanez JEM
- Ibanez PGM301
- Jackson DR3 with EMG
- Daemoness 'Forest' Cimmerian VI
- Solar Guitars Type S (modded with EMG pickups)
- Mesa Boogie Mark V
- Mesa Boogie Triaxis Pre Amplifiers
- Peavey 5150
- Fractal Audio Axe-FX II

Jari Mäenpää no longer performs guitar live, on Facebook he released the following statement, "After thinking about it for a long time I have made the decision to drop the live guitar, which means that I will solely become 100% live vocalist."

== Discography ==
Band	Year of release	Title	Label
Immemorial	No commercial release	Ensiferum – Immemorial Split Demo	
Ensiferum	1997	Demo 1	
Ensiferum	1999	Demo 2	
Ensiferum	1999	Hero in a Dream	
Arthemesia	2001	Devs – Iratvs	Native North
Ensiferum	2001	Ensiferum	Spinefarm
Ensiferum	2004	Iron	Spinefarm
Wintersun	2004	Wintersun	Nuclear Blast
Ensiferum	2005	1997–1999 (compilation)	
Wintersun	2012	Time I	Nuclear Blast
Wintersun	2017	The Forest Seasons	Nuclear Blast
Wintersun	2024	Time II	Nuclear Blast
