= Cadacross =

Finnish melodic death metal band

- Origin: Hämeenlinna, Finland
- Genres: Melodic death metal; power metal; folk metal
- Years active: 1997–2005
- Label: Low Frequency Records
- Past members: Sami Aarnio; Tino Ahola; Kimmo Miettinen; Antti Ventola

Cadacross was a Finnish melodic death metal band formed in 1997. They went through a major line-up change after their debut album, So Pale Is the Light. Georg Laakso, guitarist and vocalist, was the only remaining member from the previous lineup. On Cadacross' second album, Corona Borealis, their sound became more distinctive and resembled such bands as Turisas and other Finnish viking and folk metal bands.

== End of band ==
On October 27, 2005, Laakso was incapacitated after a motoring accident that injured his spinal cord and brought about the end of Cadacross and Laakso's career as guitarist for Turisas. Since then, Laakso has been making music in his home studio.

== Band members ==
=== Final lineup ===
- Sami Aarnio – vocals (see also Turisas)
- Georg Laakso – guitar/vocals (see also Turisas)
- Tino Ahola – guitar
- Jukka-Pekka Miettinen – bass (see also Arthemesia)
- Antti Ventola – keyboard (see also Turisas)
- Nina Laakso – backing vocals
- Kimmo Miettinen – drums (see also Arthemesia)

=== Former ===
- Tommi Saari – guitar
- Jarkko Lemmetty – bass
- Mathias Nygård – keyboards
- Janne Salo – drums

== Discography ==
=== Albums ===
- So Pale Is the Light (2001)
- Corona Borealis (2002)

=== Demos ===
- Power of the Night (1997)
- Bloody Way (1998)
