= Stormcrow (album) =

Studio album by Cain's Offering
- Released: 19 May 2015
- Genre: Power metal
- Length: 57:34
- Label: Frontiers

Cain's Offering chronology
Gather the Faithful (2009)	Stormcrow (2015)

Stormcrow is the second studio album by Finnish power metal supergroup Cain's Offering, released on 19 May 2015. It is their first album with keyboardist Jens Johansson (Stratovarius, ex-Yngwie Malmsteen) and bassist Jonas Kuhlberg. The first song to be made available was the title-track, streamed from 22 April on. Eight days later, the band streamed "The Best of Times".

Guitarist and main songwriter Jani Liimatainen said he was approached a few years before about the possibility of a second Cain's Offering album, but at that time he was unavailable. When the subject came into consideration again in 2014, he decided to give it a try since he had more time. Comparing it to the previous album, Gather the Faithful, he said:

I think musically the new album is a bit more focused and coherent. 'Gather The Faithful' was the first album where I wrote all the music and lyrics by myself, and in retrospect maybe I was a bit too ambitious, trying to prove that I can actually write really good, complex songs. It's been six years since the first one and I think that I have matured as a writer, not trying to prove anything anymore, just trying to write the best possible material. It's still very much vocal- and melody-orientated writing, since, to me, the melody is always the king, but I did try to keep things a bit more simple this time.

Drummer Jani Hurula described it as "majestic and humongous" and also said the album songs "are more concentrated and have more meat around them, ... Just the way we like them. The production was also exactly what each of us wanted it to be this time around." The title of the album, according to him, fits the band "perfectly. ... The underdogs are back with a vengeance!". Hurula also said the band is going to shoot a video for the album and they are also willing to tour, but he gave no further details. Liimatainen also expressed his wish to tour and shoot a video, but he depends on his bandmates schedules.

== Track listing ==
All songs written by Jani Liimatainen except when noted

No.	Title	Length
1.	"Stormcrow"	6:15
2.	"The Best of Times"	4:33
3.	"A Night to Forget"	4:29
4.	"I Will Build You a Rome"	4:40
5.	"Too Tired to Run"	6:14
6.	"Constellation of Tears"	5:30
7.	"Antemortem"	5:19
8.	"My Heart Beats for No One"	4:35
9.	"I Am Legion"	5:59
10.	"Rising Sun"	5:42
11.	"On the Shore" (Liimatainen, Timo Kotipelto)	4:18
Total length:		57:34

Japanese bonus track
No.	Title	Length
12.	"Child of the Wild" (Liimatainen, Kotipelto)	5:24
Total length:		63:06

== Credits ==
Cain's Offering

- Timo Kotipelto – lead vocals
- Jani Liimatainen – lead and rhythm guitars, acoustic guitar, backing vocals
- Jens Johansson – keyboards, piano
- Jonas Kuhlberg – bass
- Jani Hurula – drums

Additional musicians

- Petri Aho – backing vocals
- Antti Railio – backing vocals
- Perttu Vänskä – orchestral arrangements (on track 1, 5, 7 & 9)
