= Teemu Mäntysaari =

Finnish guitarist (born 1987)

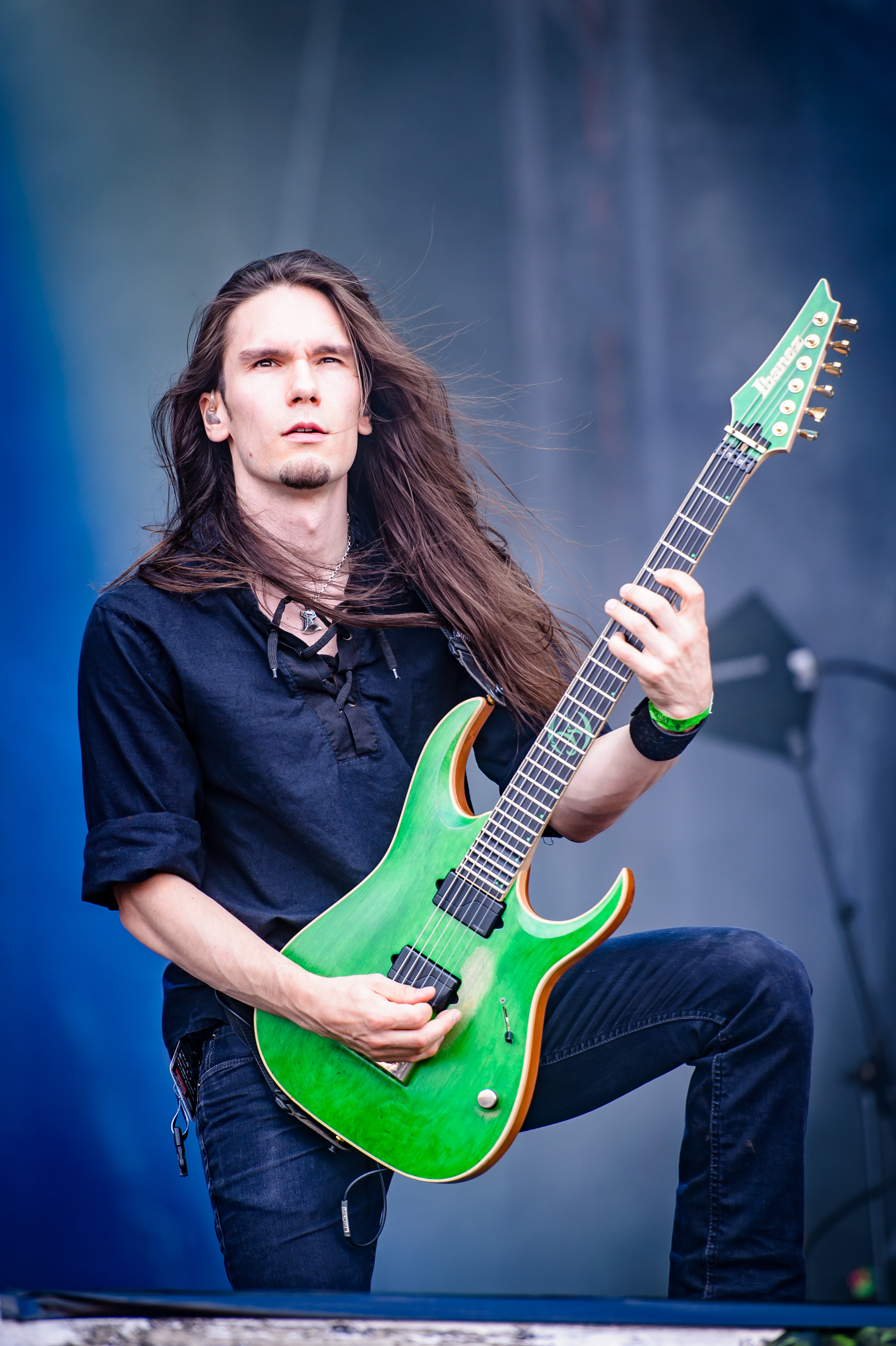
- Mäntysaari performing with Wintersun in 2018

Background information
- Born: 7 January 1987 (age 39)
- Origin: Pälkäne, Finland
- Genres: Melodic death metal; power metal; thrash metal
- Occupation: Musician
- Instrument: Guitar
- Years active: 2004–present
- Member of: Wintersun; Smackbound; Megadeth
- Formerly of: Imperanon
- Website: teemumantysaari.com

Teemu Mäntysaari (Finnish pronunciation: [ˈteːmu ˈmæntyˌsɑːri]; born 7 January 1987) is a Finnish musician. He is best known for playing lead guitar with symphonic death metal band Wintersun, and as the current second guitarist of Megadeth. He has also played with Imperanon, Induction, and Smackbound.

== Early life ==
Mäntysaari was born in Pälkäne, Finland, on 7 January 1987. His main interest as a child was sports. He played football, ice hockey and floorball in local teams. He started playing the acoustic guitar at the age of 12 and soon after picked up the electric guitar.

== Career ==
In 2004, Mäntysaari joined the melodic death metal band Wintersun and has toured with them since then. He also played for Imperanon until their breakup in 2007. He has written many unreleased songs with Imperanon.

He has also played for Smackbound since 2015.

On 5 September 2023, Mäntysaari stepped in as lead guitarist on Megadeth's North American tour as regular guitarist Kiko Loureiro tended to undisclosed family matters. He was appointed on Loureiro's recommendation.

On 21 November 2023, Megadeth band leader Dave Mustaine released an official statement, announcing that the band is "going to move forward with Teemu Mäntysaari as the guitar player for Megadeth" while Loureiro stays on an indefinite hiatus. This became permanent as Loureiro announced his departure from Megadeth later that month.

== Discography ==
Band	Release	Title	Label
Imperanon	2006	Demo 2006	
Wintersun	2012	Time I	Nuclear Blast
Induction	2016	The Outwitted Consecration (single)	Independent
Wintersun	2017	The Forest Seasons	Nuclear Blast
Wintersun	2017	Tuska 2013 Live	Nuclear Blast
Kevin Sherwood (ksherwoodops)	2019	A Light from the Shore	Independent – Call of Duty: Black Ops 4
Smackbound	2020	20/20	Frontiers
Smackbound	2023	Hostage	Frontiers
Wintersun	2024	Time II	Nuclear Blast
Megadeth	2026	Megadeth	Frontiers

== Related links ==
- Media related to Teemu Mäntysaari at Wikimedia Commons
- Wintersun's page on the Nuclear Blast website
