= Wintersun =

Finnish melodic death metal band

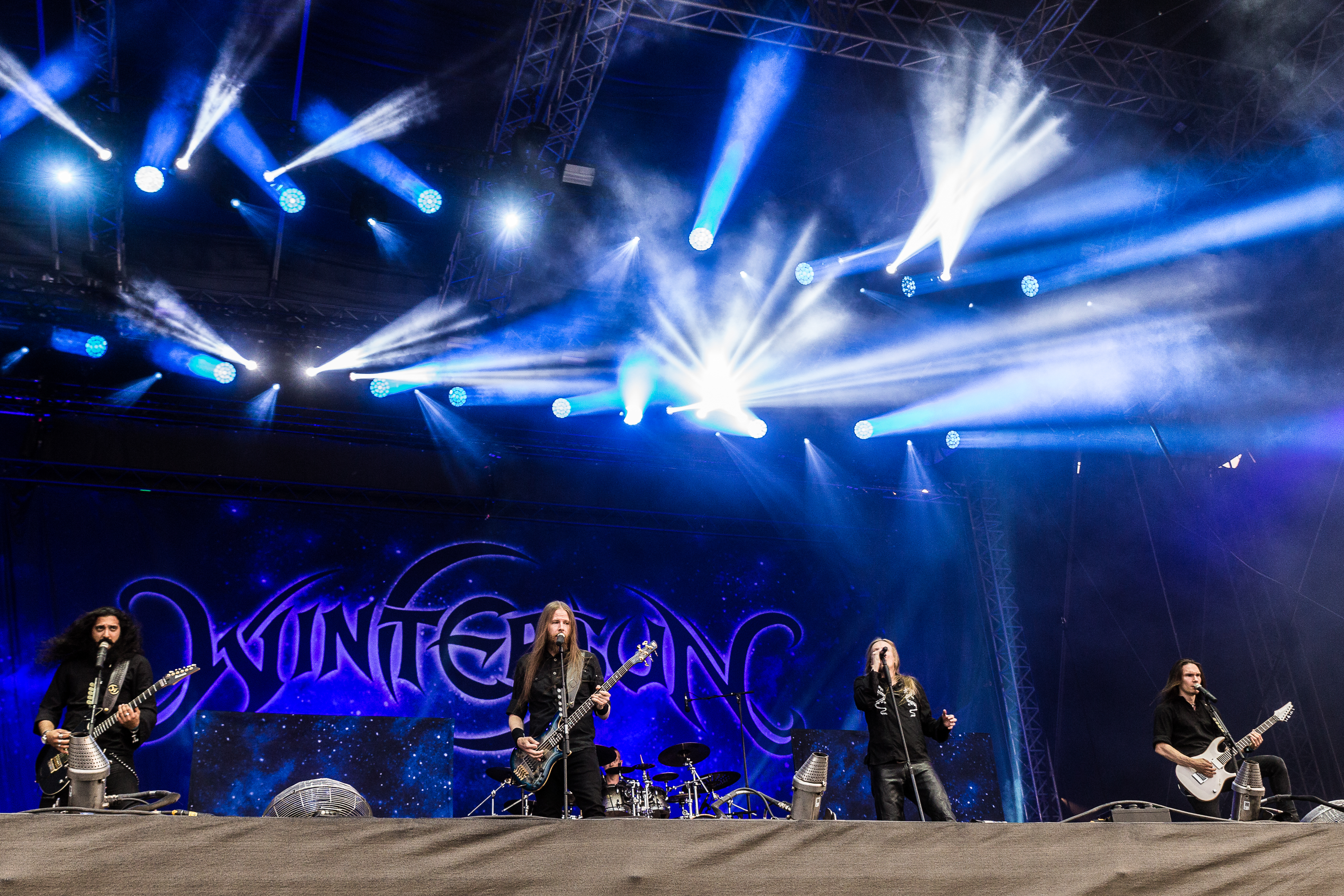
- Wintersun in 2019

Background information
- Origin: Helsinki, Finland
- Genres: Melodic death metal; symphonic metal; power metal; neo-classical metal; black metal
- Years active: 2003–present
- Label: Nuclear Blast
- Members: Jari Mäenpää; Kai Hahto; Teemu Mäntysaari; Jukka Koskinen
- Past members: Oliver Fokin; Timo Häkkinen; Asim Searah; Rolf Pilve

Wintersun is a Finnish symphonic/melodic death metal band from Helsinki originally formed as the side project of Jari Mäenpää, then-vocalist and guitarist of folk metal band Ensiferum.

In 2003, Mäenpää began pulling together songs that he had been working on since 1995. These songs followed specific themes described by Mäenpää as majestic, "spacy", and melodic. While Mäenpää planned to perform and record each instrument for the first album himself, he still required a drummer. He sent demos to Kai Hahto, former member of Rotten Sound, who agreed to perform the drums.

After obtaining a record deal, Mäenpää scheduled studio time to record the first album. Ensiferum's tour to support their 2004 release was scheduled at the same time, which forced Mäenpää to request time off from the band. The band instead fired him, and Mäenpää was free to go ahead with the production of his self-titled album, Wintersun.

After the release of Wintersun, the band found permanent members to perform shows and promote the album, although a keyboardist would never be found due to the increasingly-complex and expansive nature of the orchestrations and synth parts on the new music that Mäenpää was writing at the time. In 2006, Wintersun began work on their second and third albums, Time I and Time II, which were initially intended to be released as a single album. Recording began in May of that year, but the albums would be the recipient of years-long delays for a multitude of reasons, not the least of which was the complexity of each song's mix.

Two of the band's members, drummer Kai Hahto and bassist Jukka Koskinen, are also members of Finnish symphonic metal band Nightwish. In November 2023, Teemu Mäntysaari became a full member of American thrash metal band Megadeth, having filled-in on their most recent tour after Kiko Loureiro's departure.

== History ==
=== 2003–2004: Creation and Wintersun ===
I have a little bit of a mournful, melancholic, majestic or kinda "spacy" way of writing when it comes to melodies.

— Jari Mäenpää, MetalEater.com

Jari Mäenpää began Wintersun in 2003 "to make songs that make you feel like you are floating in space." Mäenpää chose the name "Wintersun" from a list a friend had produced, later explaining, "Winter reflects the cold and stormy side of the album and also the Finnish melancholy and magic. Sun is related to the 'universe, space and stars'-feel of the album, which is also strongly connected to the lyrics." Although the songs that would appear on Wintersun had collectively been written between 1995 and 2004 (see each track's respective composition dates here), Mäenpää kept his songwriting efforts primarily focused on folk metal band Ensiferum, with whom he had been playing since 1996.

Mäenpää contacted Rotten Sound drummer Kai Hahto, who, upon hearing demos, agreed to work as the session drummer for Wintersun. Mäenpää and Hahto recorded demo versions of "Winter Madness", "Beyond the Dark Sun", and "Death and the Healing", which were sent directly to Nuclear Blast. The label offered a contract for several albums stipulating that a three-song demo must be approved before each new album is recorded.

Even after obtaining a record deal, Mäenpää intended on keeping Wintersun as a side project during his tenure as lead singer and guitarist for Ensiferum. Unfortunately, to support the 2004 release of Ensiferum's Iron, Spinefarm Records scheduled a European tour with dates that conflicted with studio time Mäenpää had booked to record Wintersun. After requesting a break from the band, Mäenpää was fired from Ensiferum.

Mäenpää focused his energies on recording Wintersun despite the lack of formal band members. The vocals, guitars, bass, and keyboards on Wintersun were performed solely by Mäenpää, who was already adept at recording multi-instrumental songs, having grown up with 8- and 16-track equipment. Three studios were used in the making of Wintersun: drums were recorded at Tico-Tico Studios, Mäenpää's vocals, synth, and guitarwork were recorded at Sundi Coop Studios, and Nino Laurenne mixed the album at Sonic Pump Studios. Mäenpää recorded additional synth and guitar solos on his 16-track recorder. Wintersun was released on 13 September 2004.

=== 2004–2006: Band formation and Wintersun promotion ===
Inspired by Wintersun's musical direction, Kai Hahto left Rotten Sound and joined Wintersun as permanent drummer, and Jukka Koskinen, of Norther, joined Wintersun as bassist. Oliver Fokin, former drummer for Ensiferum and whom Mäenpää credits as inspiring him to start playing guitar, was hired as guitarist. The search for a keyboardist proved to be ineffectual.

The music video for Beyond the Dark Sun was shot over a period of two days: 3 and 4 July 2004. It was produced and directed by Maurice Swinkels.

On 4 October 2004, Wintersun announced the departure of Oliver Fokin as guitarist, and a suitable replacement would not be found until 27 December when Teemu Mäntysaari joined. The search for a keyboardist continued, and Wintersun was forced to use backup tapes for their future performances.

=== 2006–2017: Time I ===
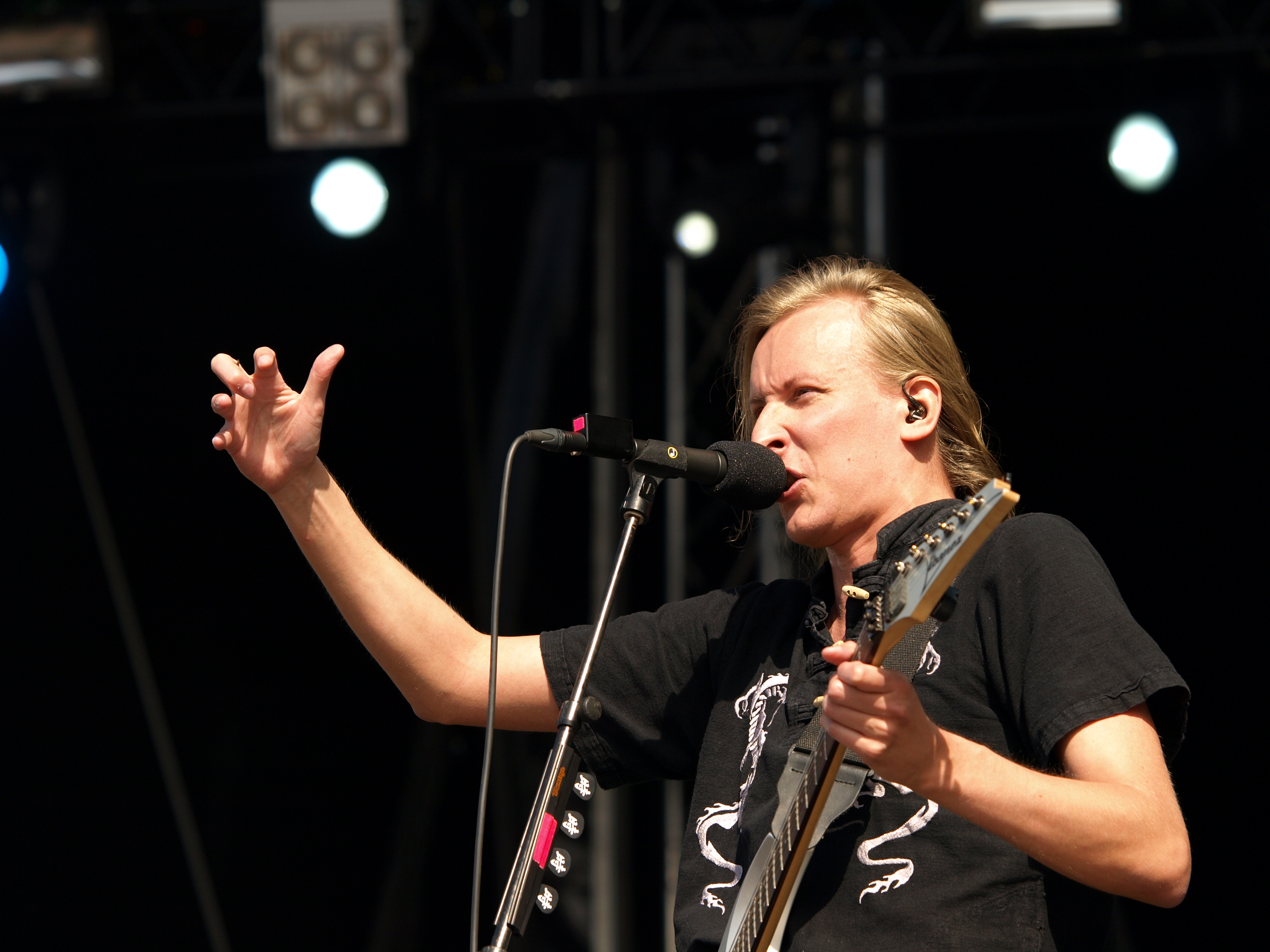
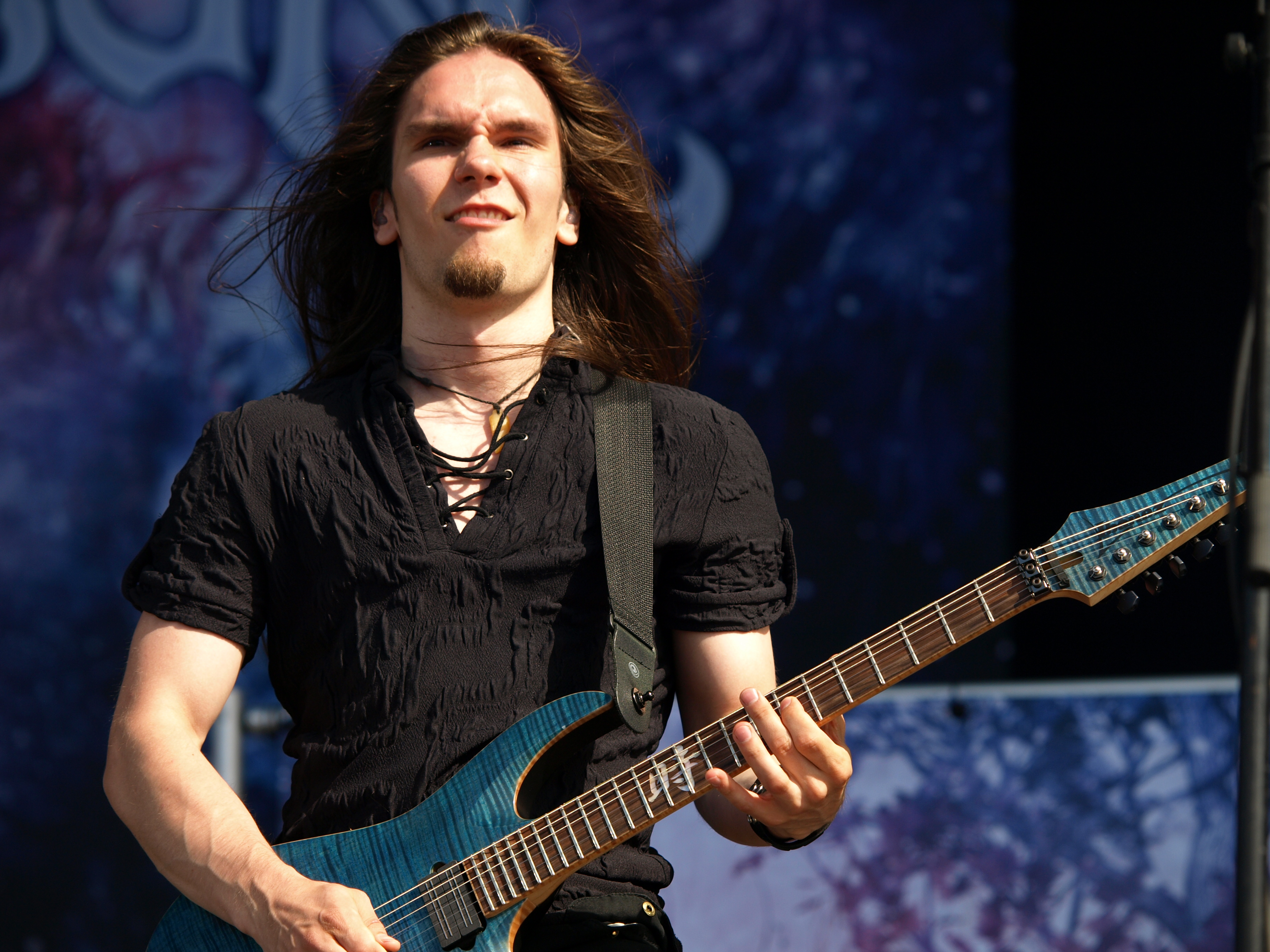
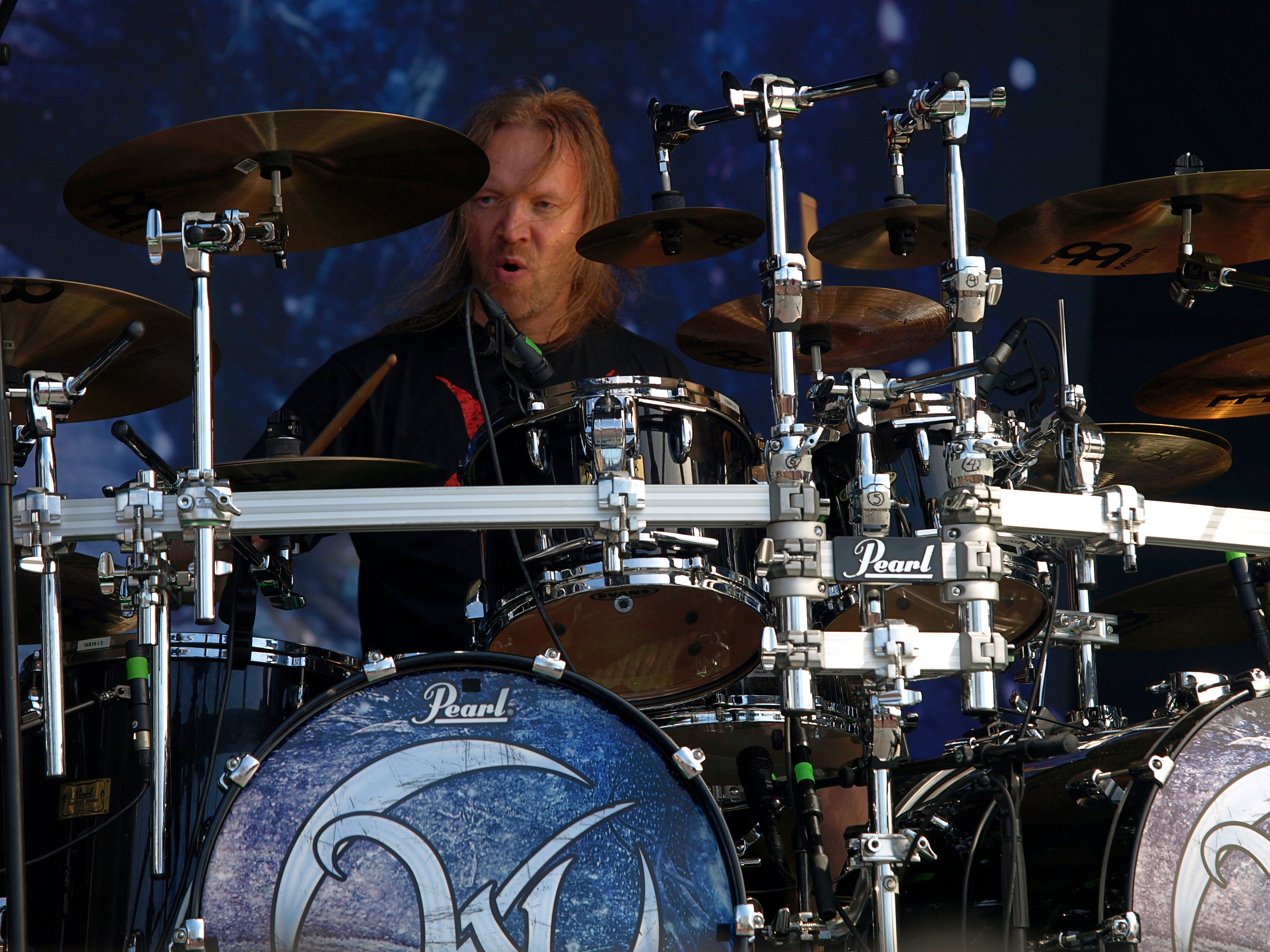
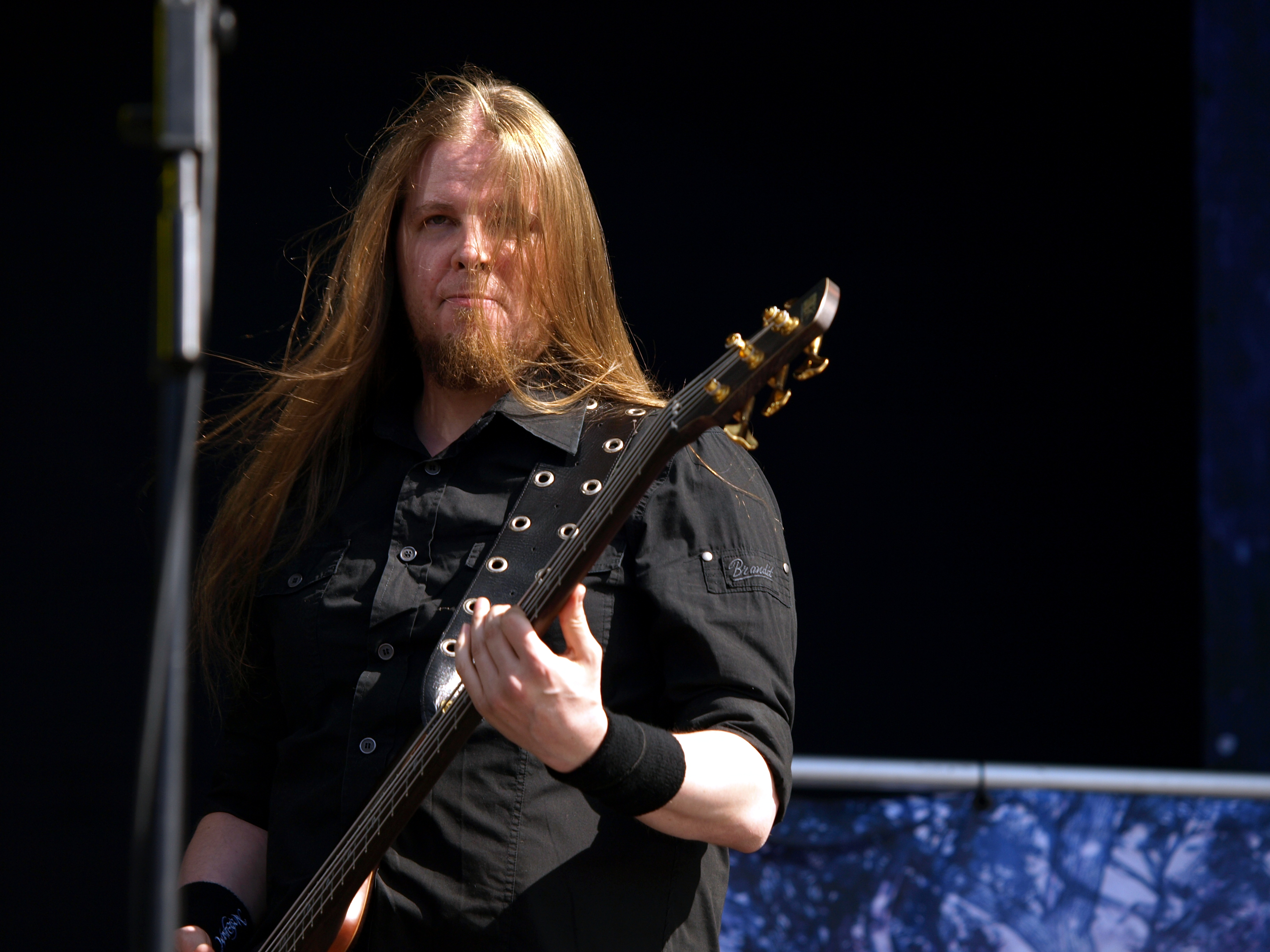
Wintersun at Tuska Open Air Metal Festival 2013

Recording for the second album, tentatively titled Time, began on 2 May 2006. Wintersun entered Sonic Pump Studios with Thunderstone's Nino Laurenne as sound engineer. Recording of Hahto's drum tracks began on 3 May. Rhythm guitars and bass were also recorded during the session. Mäenpää would record synthesizers and sampling, guitar solos, acoustic guitars, vocals, and Mäntysaari's guitarwork at his apartment studio. The album was planned to have seven songs and an intro and outro. The songs' compositions are complex, being composed of 200 to 300 tracks each.

Time would face multiple setbacks, delaying the album's release for years. On 23 October 2006, Wintersun released a statement that, because recording was continually delayed, the dates for the album's mix would be pushed back to May 2007, causing Wintersun's appearance at Ragnarök Festival that same month to be cancelled. A tentative release date for August 2007 was given.

On 17 April 2007, Mäenpää released a statement updating the status on the album, detailing that difficulties with hardware failures caused further delays in the recording process. The mix dates were cancelled, and because Laurenne's schedule at Sonic Pump Studios was full for the remainder of the year, the album's release was pushed back further. By this time, all guitars, including solos and acoustic, were recorded, and the intro was completed. Mäenpää had begun composing and arranging the synth layers, but stress and frustration had been hindering his creativity.

Hahto issued an update on 5 June 2008, explaining that the album's delay would be indefinite. Difficulties with computer hardware due to limited amount of RAM affected Mäenpää's ability to compose orchestrations in real time. However, the band appeared in Metalcamp in July 2008.

While technical difficulties pursued Wintersun into 2009, problems impeding the album's progress would eventually include Mäenpää's actual apartment. (Note: Jari Mäenpää has expounded on several of the problems causing Time's ceaseless delays on Wintersun's official message board.) The increase in stress caused Mäenpää to have writer's block. Wintersun cancelled all 2009 promotional tours to focus solely on the album's completion.

On 17 November 2010, the Wintersun official homepage was updated stating that they would again be playing live shows. Three events, Metalfest, Bloodstock, and Metalcamp were announced. The reason stated for these shows was that a deal with their label provided money for new computer hardware in return for playing the shows.

On 16 March 2012, Wintersun announced via their official homepage that they would headline the Heidenfest Tour in October 2012. The band also stated that the mixing of their new album, Time, was going well and that a release was planned for late summer of the same year. They also stated that Time would be split in two albums. On 18 July 2012, Wintersun announced on their official homepage that part I of Time would be released on 12 October 2012. Time I was released a week later than anticipated on 19 October 2012. In support of the new album, Wintersun embarked on their first tour of North America, supporting Eluveitie along with Varg, starting in late November.

Mixing for Time II began in early 2013. The band stated the album "will continue where 'Time I' left [off]" and include seven guitar solos. The album was expected to be released in early 2014. In August 2013, Wintersun embarked on a second North American tour. Support was provided by fellow Nuclear Blast artists Fleshgod Apocalypse, Arsis, and Starkill, with Wintersun headlining.

On 29 January 2015, Wintersun announced via their official Facebook page that Kai Hahto would be unable to perform in upcoming live shows, due to his obligations to Nightwish. Timo Häkkinen was named as his temporary replacement for live performances. In November 2016, Wintersun announced that they were looking for a second guitarist for the band so Mäenpää could focus solely on vocals during live performances.

=== 2017–2023: The Forest Seasons and lineup changes ===
On 4 January 2017, the band announced on their Facebook page that the recording for their third studio album was completed and that it would be released later that same year. The album is not going to be "Time II", but rather a new project. On 11 January 2017 the band announced the name of their third studio album, The Forest Seasons. On 1 March the band started a crowdfunding campaign on the Indiegogo platform, the first of three projected campaigns, aiming to raise funds for their own studio. The first campaign was successful, surpassing the minimum objective of 150,000 euro in a single day, and raising 464,330 euro in total.

On 17 August 2017, the band posted their future tour dates and notified fans that drummer, Kai Hahto, is still recovering from hand injuries and cannot tour. Hahto will be continuing his tour with Nightwish. Wintersun announced its new session drummer will be Rolf Pilve of Stratovarius.

On 15 July 2019, Hahto was announced as Nightwish's permanent drummer following Jukka Nevalainen's decision not to return to the band.

On 28 May 2021, Jukka Koskinen was revealed as Nightwish's session bass player for their world tour in 2021 and 2022. Koskinen was announced to have joined Nightwish as a full-time member on 21 August 2022.

On 4 May 2022, it was announced that session guitarist Asim Searah had departed the band.

On 28 November 2023, Teemu Mäntysaari was announced as a full member of Megadeth following the departure of Kiko Loureiro.

=== 2024–present: Time II ===
On 12 January 2024, Wintersun announced on its social media that Time II is "100%" complete. Three days later, on 15 January 2024, the band announced that "the album release will happen in the late summer of 2024, the latest early fall" and a second crowdfunding campaign was also announced. On 9 February, the band revealed the track list and cover art for Time II. The band released Time II on 30 August. The band also released a 12-disc boxset entitled the Time Package, containing alternate versions of tracks from Time II and The Forest Seasons, as well as five albums of early demo tracks for a planned four-album series.

== Musical style ==
Wintersun is known for creative harmonies, fast tempos and both harsh and clean vocals. Although Mäenpää enjoys writing his music without limiting it to any genre, the band's myriad styles have been broadly described as melodic death metal, symphonic metal, power metal, neo-classical metal, black metal, and folk metal. A number of sources have referred to the band as "epic metallers". Mäenpää has spoken about the genre of Wintersun's music, and says "Well it's difficult to put into a certain genre, cause there's lots of variation. But to describe it, I would say something like: Extreme Majestic Technical Epic Melodic Metal." He has also stated "But it's really not death metal. It's very difficult even for me to label it, but if somebody would put a gun on my forehead, I would probably say something like Extreme Melodic Majestic Metal."

== Band members ==
Wintersun live at Rockharz 2019, Germany

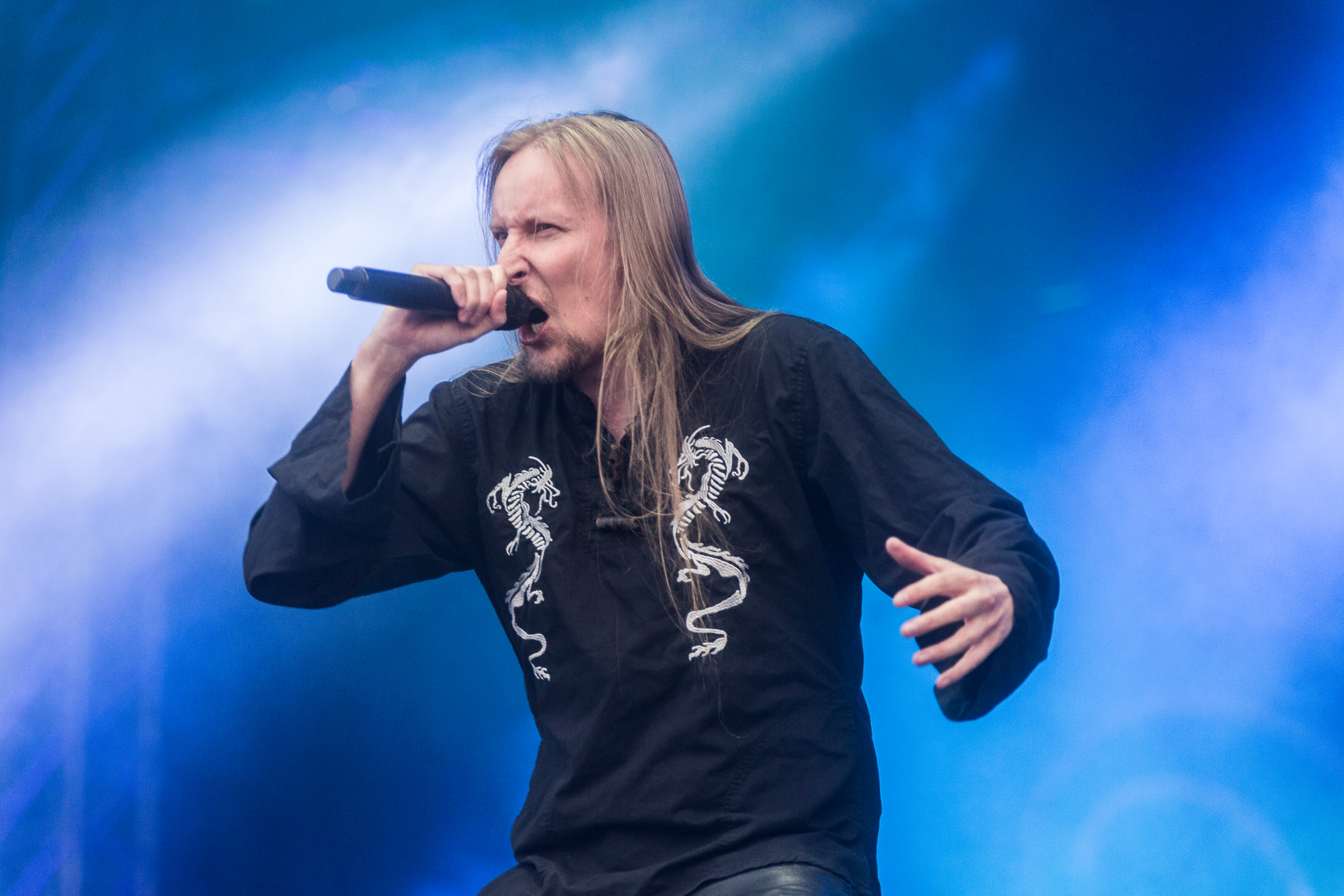
Jari Mäenpää

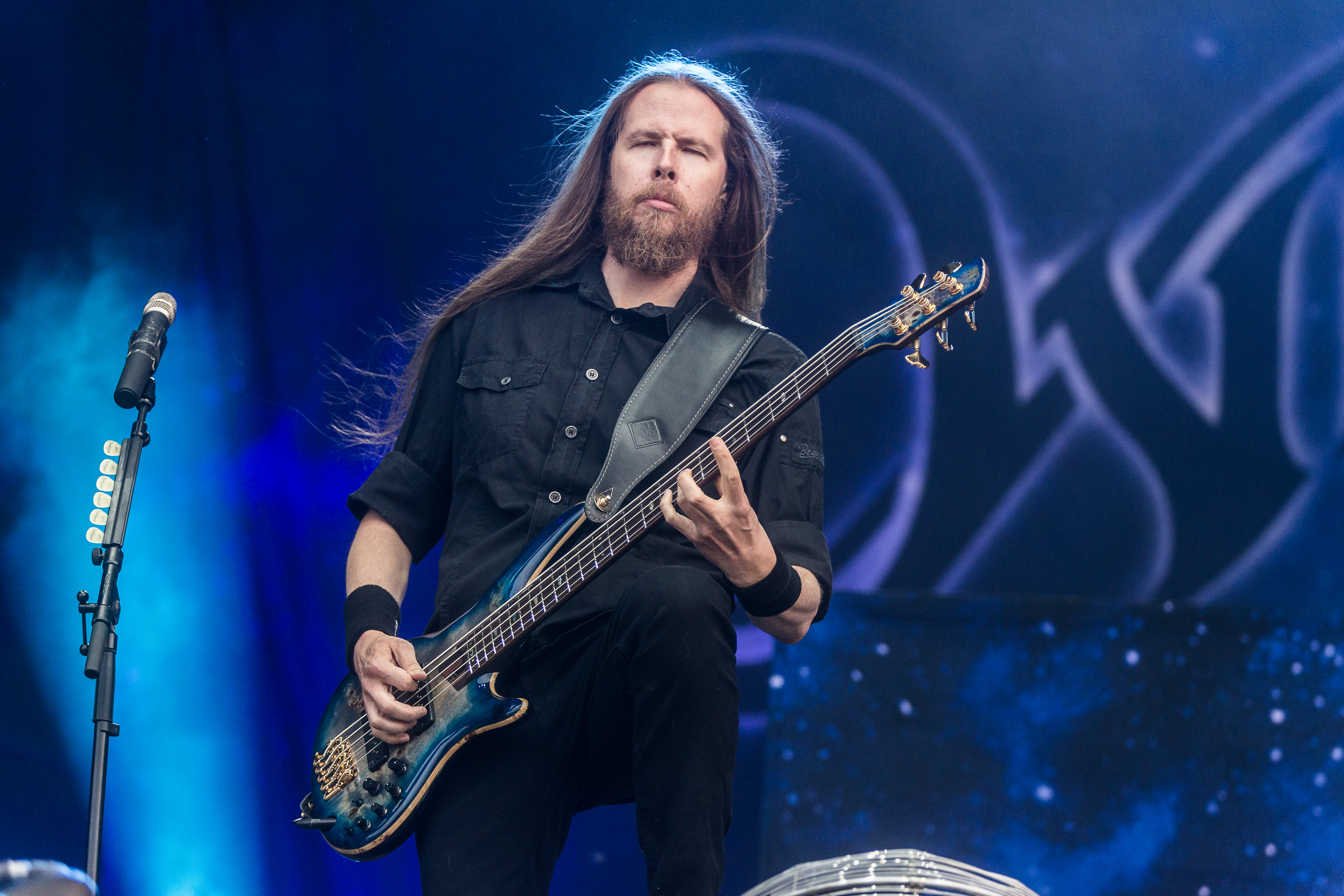
Jukka Koskinen

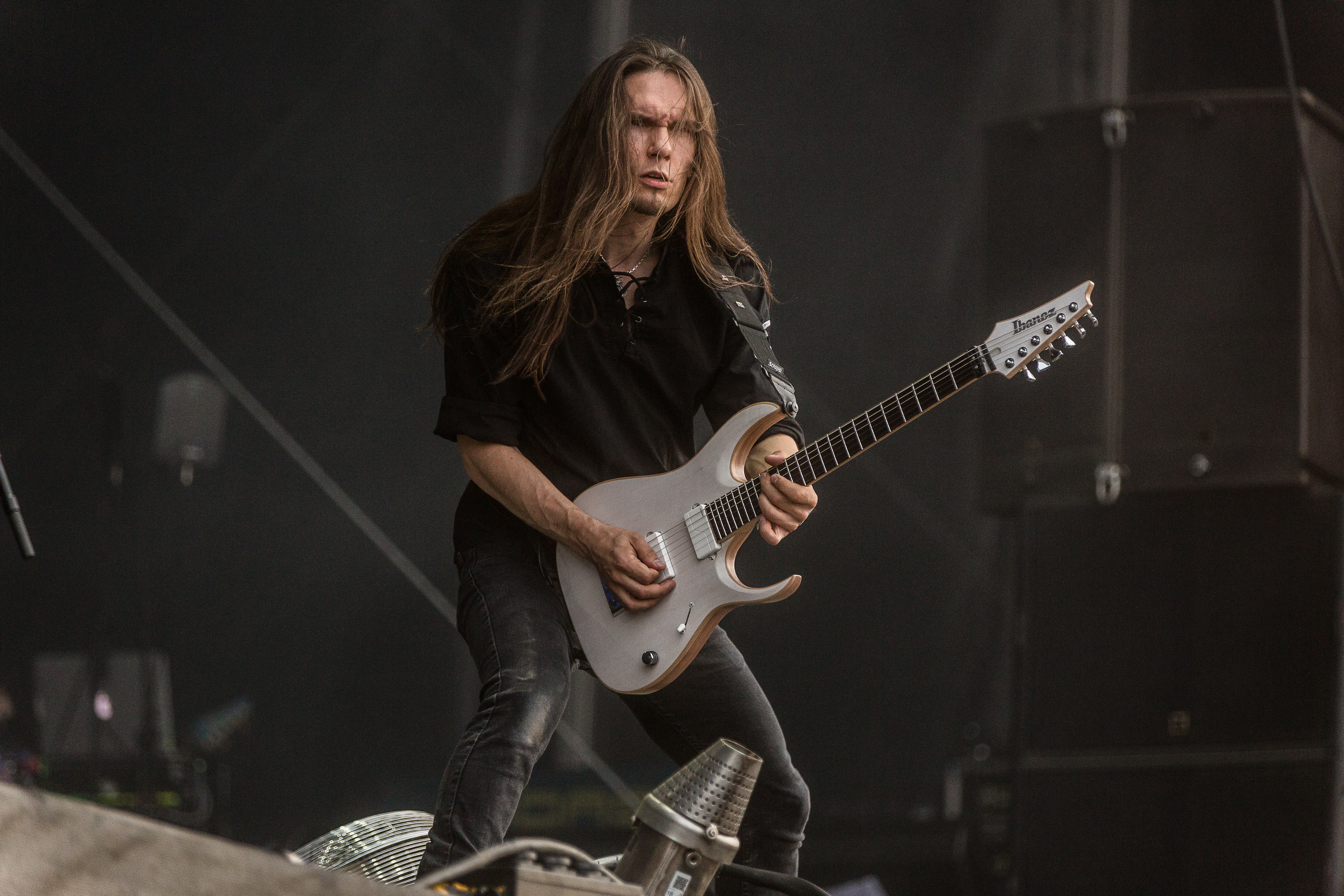
Teemu Mäntysaari

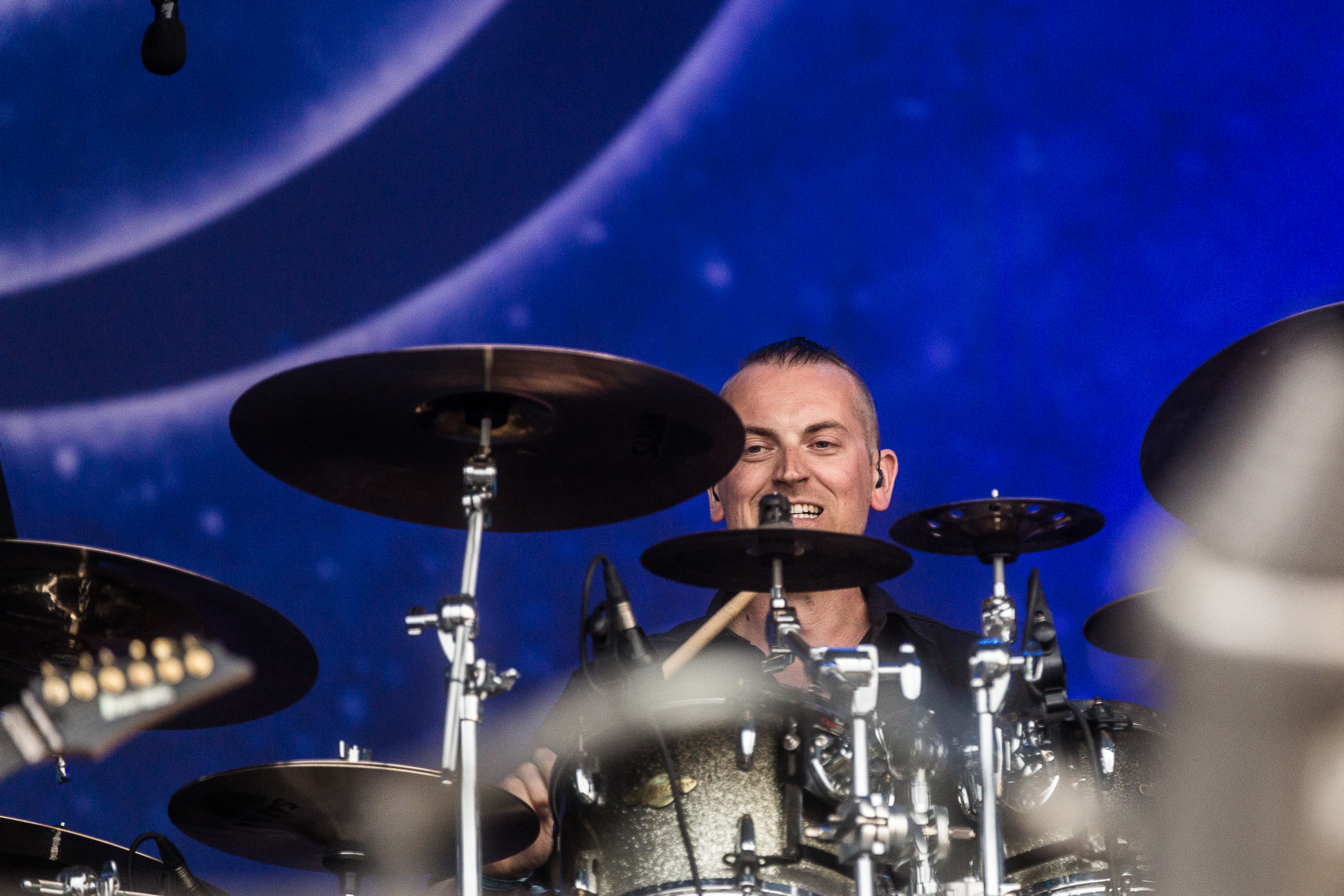
Heikki Saari

=== Current ===
- Jari Mäenpää − lead vocals, rhythm guitar, keyboards (2003–present, studio lead guitar 2016–present), bass (2003−2004)
- Kai Hahto − drums (2003–present; on touring hiatus since 2017)
- Jukka Koskinen − bass, backing vocals (2004–present)
- Teemu Mäntysaari − lead guitar, backing vocals (2004–present)

=== Live ===
- Timo Häkkinen − drums (2015–2016)
- Asim Searah − rhythm guitar, backing vocals (2017–2022)
- Rolf Pilve − drums (2017–2018)
- Heikki Saari – drums (2018–present)

=== Former ===
- Oliver Fokin − lead guitar (2004)

== Discography ==
=== Studio albums ===
Title	Album details	Peak chart positions							
Title	Album details	FIN	AUT	BEL (FL)	BEL (WA)	FRA	GER	SWI	US Heat
Wintersun	Released: 13 September 2004; Label: Nuclear Blast; Formats: CD, LP, digital download	25	—	—	—	—	—	—	—
Time I	Released: 19 October 2012; Label: Nuclear Blast; Formats: CD, LP, digital download	2	33	—	—	—	21	26	4
The Forest Seasons	Released: 21 July 2017; Label: Nuclear Blast; Formats: CD, LP, digital download	1	20	124	170	193	14	16	2
Time II	Released: 30 August 2024; Label: Nuclear Blast; Formats: CD, LP, digital download	1	9	—	—	—	11	8	—

=== Other releases ===
- Winter Madness (2004) – demo
- Wintersun: Tour Edition (2006) – live album
- Live at Tuska Festival 2013 (2017) – live album
- Time Package (2024) – 12-disc compilation boxset
- The Songs of Jari Mäenpää I (2024) – demo compilation
- The Songs of Jari Mäenpää II (2024) – demo compilation
- The Songs of Jari Mäenpää III (2024) – demo compilation
- Jari Mäenpää's 4-Track Madness (2024) – demo compilation
- Fantasy Metal Project by Jari Mäenpää (2024) – demo compilation

=== Videography ===
- "Beyond the Dark Sun" (2004) – music video
- Live at Summer Breeze 2005 (2005) – DVD
