= Norther (band) =

Finnish melodic death metal band

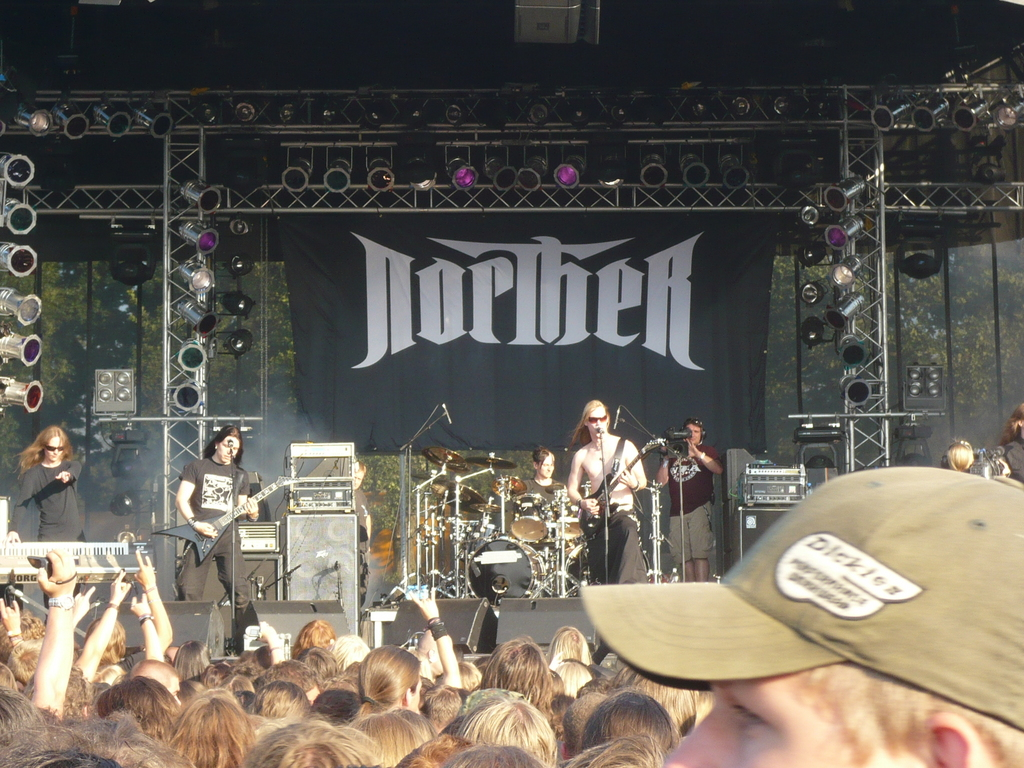
- Norther Wacken Open Air 2007

Background information
- Also known as: Requiem (1996–2000); Decayed (2000)
- Origin: Espoo, Finland
- Genres: Melodic death metal; power metal
- Years active: 1996–2012; 2026–present
- Labels: Century Media; Marquee Avalon; Spinefarm

Norther is a Finnish melodic death metal band from Espoo that formed in 1996, disbanded in 2012, and reformed in 2026. They released six studio albums.

== History ==
Norther formed as Requiem (Lindroos, Korpas, Hallio) in 1996 after various early formations. The band's debut album, Dreams of Endless War, was released through Spinefarm Records in 2002. It entered the Finnish charts at number 17. At the time, Norther played shows only in and around the Helsinki area. That changed when the album Mirror of Madness came out in early 2003 (entering the Finnish charts at number 11). The group toured with Dimmu Borgir and Hypocrisy in late 2003.

In early 2004, Norther released its third full-length album, Death Unlimited, which reached 17 on the Finnish charts. Norther played several shows in 2005 and then recorded the EP Solution 7 at Astia Studio. It placed at number 5 on the Finnish charts. Norther added Kristian Ranta's vocals afterward.

In the summer of 2005, Norther entered Studio Fredman in Gothenburg to record their fourth full-length-album, Till Death Unites Us, with producers Fredrik Nordström and Patrick J. Sten. Soon after, Toni Hallio left the band to pursue other interests. Heikki Saari replaced him on drums. After its release in January 2006, Till Death Unites Us placed at number six on the Finnish album charts. Later the same year, the band composed the theme song, "Frozen Angel", for a major Finnish feature film, V2: Dead Angel, produced by Solarfilms, Inc. The band is also featured in the film. In February 2007, Norther released the EP No Way Back in Finland and Japan. The record reached number one in the Finnish charts. Later that year, they released Amoral & Drone and supported it with a European tour. Their fifth full-length album, N, was released in February 2008.

Petri Lindroos quit as lead vocalist in February 2009 and was replaced with Aleksi Sihvonen (ex-Imperanon) in April of that year. The band released an alternate version of the song "Frozen Angel" from their previous album with Sihvonen on vocals. Their sixth studio album, Circle Regenerated, was released on 19 April 2011.

The band made their final appearance at the Brutal Assault festival in the Czech Republic on 10 August 2012, and split up afterwards. The disbandment lasted until 2026, when they announced a reunion concert at Wacken Open Air in 2027.

== Band members ==
Current lineup

- Petri Lindroos – harsh vocals, guitars (1996–2009, 2026–present)
- Kristian Ranta – guitars (2000–2012, 2026–present), clean vocals (2004–2012, 2026–present)
- Tuomas Planman – keyboards (2000–2012, 2026–present)
- Jukka Koskinen – bass (2000–2012, 2026–present)
- Heikki Saari – drums (2005–2012, 2026–present)

Former

- Toni Hallio – drums (1996–2005)
- Roni Korpas – guitars (1996–1999)
- Tuomas Stubu – bass (1996–1997)
- Joakim Ekroos – keyboards (2000)
- Sebastian "Knight" Ekroos – bass (2000)
- Aleksi Sihvonen – harsh vocals (2009–2012)
- Daniel Freyberg – guitars, backing vocals (2009–2012)

== Discography ==
=== Studio albums ===
- Dreams of Endless War (2002)
- Mirror of Madness (2003)
- Death Unlimited (2004)
- Till Death Unites Us (2006)
- N (2008)
- Circle Regenerated (2011)

=== Demos and EPs ===
- Warlord (demo) (2000)
- Solution 7 (2005)
- No Way Back (2007)

=== Singles ===
- "Released" (2002)
- "Unleash Hell" (2003)
- "Spreading Death" (2004)
- "Spreading Death" (DVD, 2004)
- "Scream" (2006)
- "Frozen Angel" (online single, 2009)
- "Break Myself Away" (online single, 2010)

== Videography ==
Video	Album	Length
"Released"	Dreams of Endless War	4:12
"Mirror of Madness"	Mirror of Madness	4:32
"Death Unlimited"	Death Unlimited	4:55
"Frozen Angel"	No Way Back / N	4:07
"We Rock"	N	3:57
