= Jukka Koskinen =

Finnish bassist

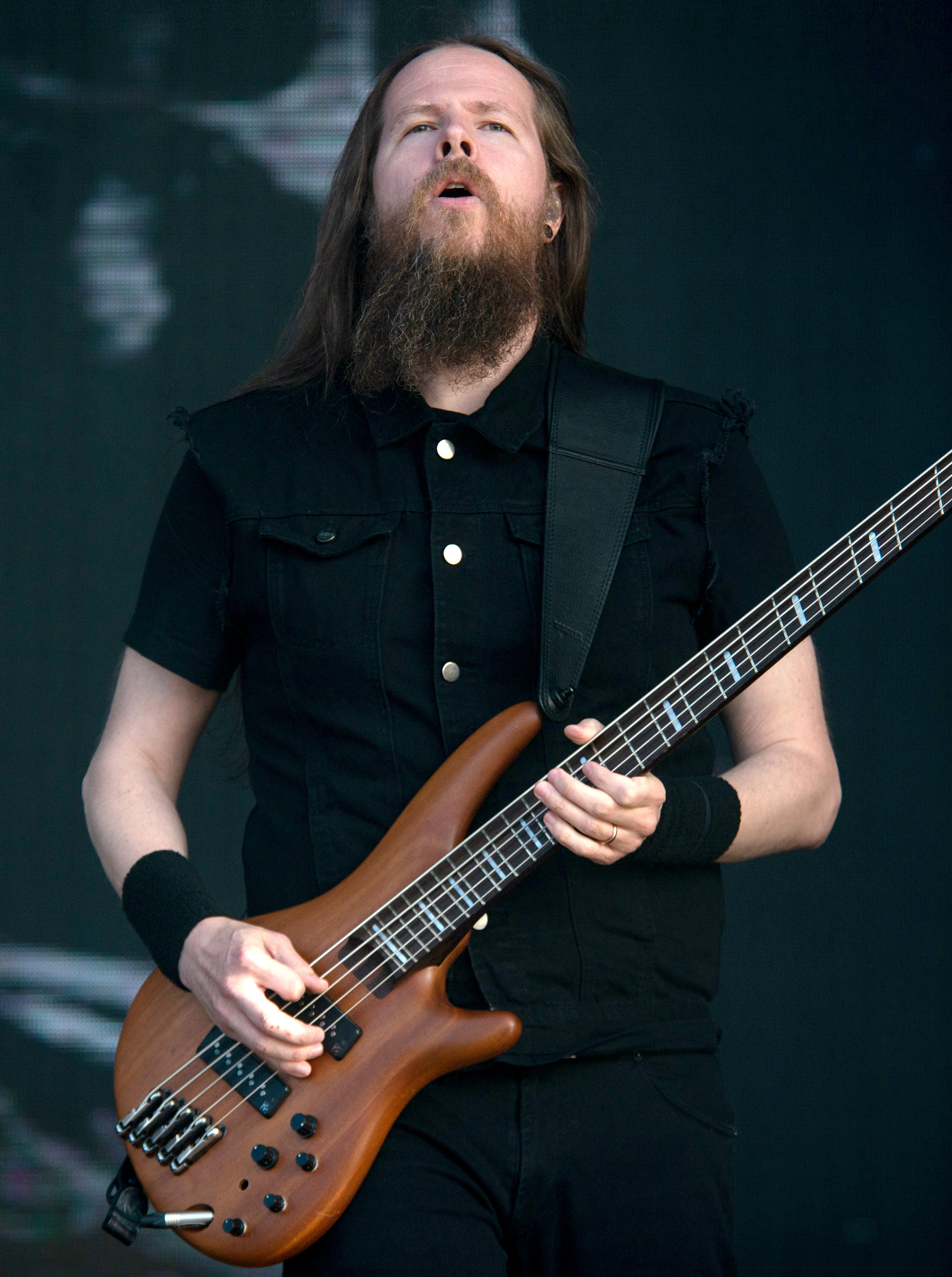
- Koskinen with Nightwish at Hellfest in 2022

Background information
- Born: 16 July 1981 (age 44); Helsinki, Finland
- Origin: Riihimäki, Finland
- Genres: Melodic death metal, power metal, symphonic metal
- Occupation: Bassist
- Years active: 2000–present
- Member of: Wintersun; Nightwish; Crownshift
- Formerly of: Norther; Cain's Offering; Amberian Dawn; Dark Sarah

Jukka Koskinen is a Finnish musician who is the bassist for the metal bands Wintersun, Nightwish and Crownshift. He was also the bassist for Norther from 2000 until their disbandment in 2012, for Amberian Dawn from 2010 until 2013, for Cain's Offering from 2009 until 2014 and for Dark Sarah in 2014. In May 2021, he was revealed as Nightwish's session bass player for the band's virtual performances and for their Human. :II: Nature. World Tour in 2021 and 2022, and later joined the band as their new permanent bass player in August 2022.
