= List of Nightwish concert tours =

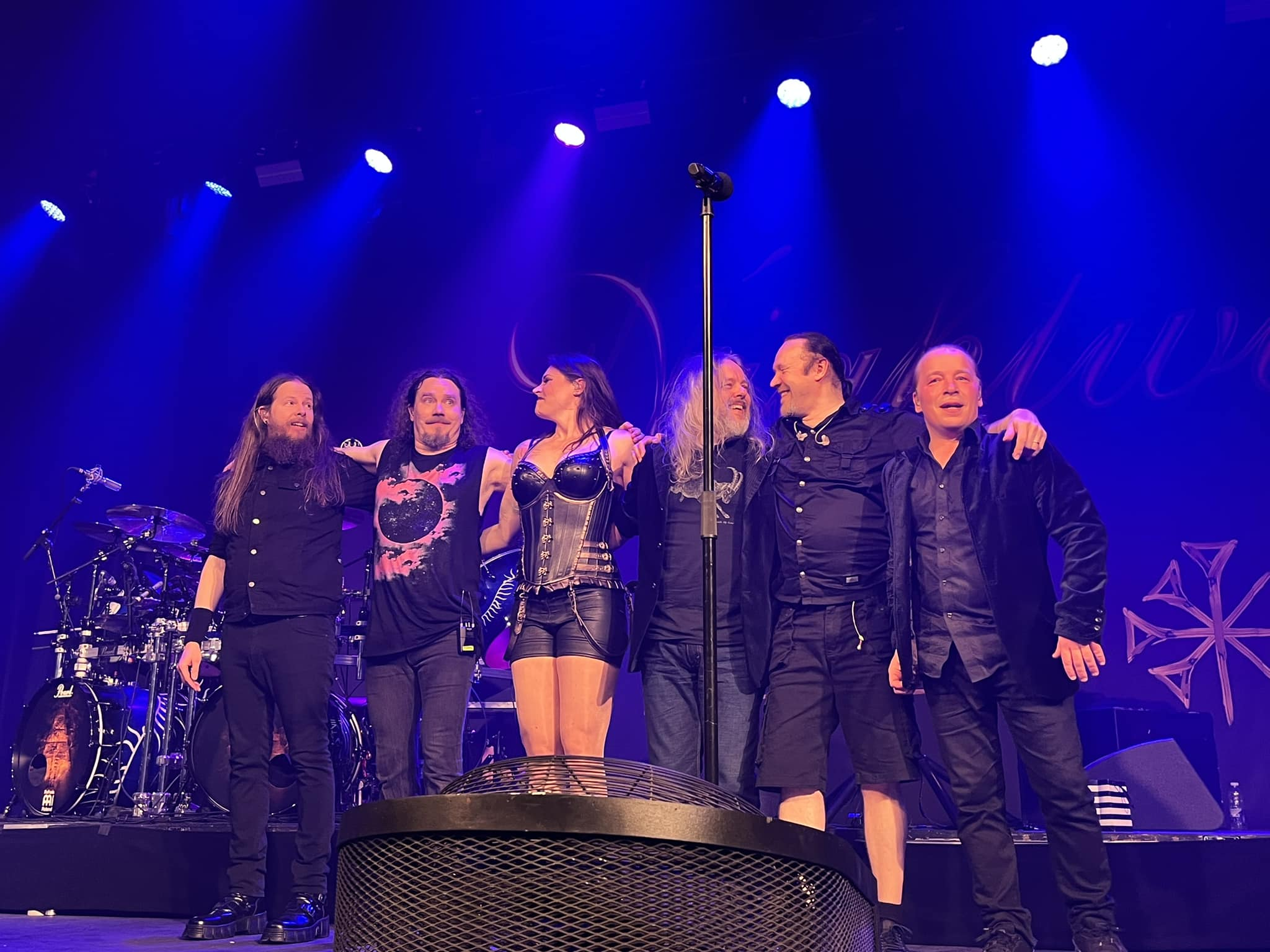
Nightwish ending a concert in 2022. From left to right: Koskinen, Holopainen, Jansen, Donockley, Hahto, and Vuorinen.

This is the list of concert tours played by the Finnish symphonic metal band Nightwish.

Nightwish was formed in 1996 by lead songwriter and keyboardist Tuomas Holopainen, guitarist Emppu Vuorinen, and lead singer Tarja Turunen, soon joined by drummer Jukka Nevalainen in 1997 and then bassist Sami Vänskä in 1998. In 2001 Vänskä was replaced by Marko Hietala, who also took over the male vocalist role, and in 2005 Turunen was fired to be replaced by Anette Olzon in 2007 and eventually by Floor Jansen in 2012. In July 2019, Nevalainen, who had been inactive since 2014 due to health issues, announced that he would not be returning to the band, with Kai Hahto, who had acted as his replacement since 2014, becoming the official drummer. Hietala parted ways with the band in January 2021, and Jukka Koskinen was announced as his replacement in August 2022. Multi-instrumentalist Troy Donockley, who had been joining the band in studio and live since 2007, was made an official member in 2013.

Nightwish is the third-best-selling band and musical entity in Finland with certified sales of nearly 900,000 certified copies and is also the most successful Finnish band worldwide, selling more than 10 million records. From 1997 until the touring hiatus which began in 2024, the band has performed almost 1000 shows around the world.

== The First Tour of the Angels ==
The First Tour of the Angels
- Tour by Nightwish
- Location: Europe
- Associated album: Angels Fall First
- Start date: December 31, 1997
- End date: November 13, 1998
- No. of shows: 8

Nightwish concert chronology
- The First Tour of the Angels (1997–1998); Summer of Wilderness (1999)

After releasing their debut studio album, Angels Fall First, in November 1997, the band played their first show in their hometown Kitee for around 400 people on 31 December 1997, but after that they were able to play only seven more shows across Finland the following year as Turunen was still finishing her studies at the time, and both Holopainen and Vuorinen had their military obligations to fulfill. These early concerts were later dubbed "The First Tour of The Angels" by the band, and they would only start gigging heavily after the release of their Oceanborn album in December 1998.

Samppa Hirvonen joined them as a sessional live member as a bass guitarist, while Marianna Pellinen was also a sessional live member as an additional keyboard player and a backing vocalist for Turunen. Sami Vänskä would later join the band instead of Hirvonen.

=== Set list ===
1. "Elvenpath"
2. "The Carpenter"
3. "Tutankhamen"
4. "Angels Fall First"
5. "Know Why the Nightingale Sings"
6. "Astral Romance"
7. "Beauty and the Beast"

=== Tour dates ===
List of 1997 and 1998 concerts, showing date, city, country and venue
Date	City	Country	Venue
31 December 1997	Kitee	Finland	Huvikeskus
9 January 1998	Helsinki	Finland	Lepakko Club
13 February 1998	Helsinki	Finland	Tavastia Club
14 February 1998	Pori	Finland	Jungle Jane
25 February 1998	Joensuu	Finland	Kellari Club
27 February 1998	Jyväskylä	Finland	Lutakko Club
6 March 1998	Siilinjärvi	Finland	Huvikumpu Club
13 November 1998	Kitee	Finland	Huvikeskus

Band

- Tarja Turunen – lead vocals
- Tuomas Holopainen – keyboards, lead vocals
- Emppu Vuorinen – guitar
- Jukka Nevalainen – drums

Additional musicians

- Samppa Hirvonen – bass
- Marianna Pellinen – additional keyboards, backing vocals

== Summer of Wilderness ==
Summer of Wilderness
- Tour by Nightwish
- Location: Europe
- Associated album: Oceanborn
- Start date: January 22, 1999
- End date: August 14, 1999
- No. of shows: 28

Nightwish concert chronology
- The First Tour of the Angels (1997–1998); Summer of Wilderness (1999); Oceanborn Europe Tour (1999)

After releasing their second studio album, Oceanborn, in December 1998, the band played a few shows in early 1999 before started touring more often in May, gigging heavily across Finland until late August, in a series of shows the band dubbed "Summer of Wilderness", playing not only headlining dates but also taking part in open air festivals as well as supporting big names at the time, such as Stratovarius and Tarot. It was their first tour with bassist Sami Vänskä, and Tapio Wilska, who recorded vocals on Oceanborn for the tracks "Devil and the Deep Dark Ocean" and "Pharaoh Sails to Orion", usually joined the band onstage to perform these two songs.

Later that year the band would tour Europe for the first time supporting Rage.

=== Set list ===
1. Sacrament of Wilderness"
2. "Elvenpath"
3. "Stargazers"
4. "Passion and the Opera"
5. "Know Why the Nightingale Sings"
6. "Devil & the Deep Dark Ocean"
7. "Walking in the Air" (Howard Blake cover)
8. "Gethsemane"
9. "Astral Romance"
10. "The Pharaoh Sails to Orion"
  Encore
11. "Beauty and the Beast"

=== Tour dates ===
List of 1999 concerts, showing date, city, country and venue
Date	City	Country	Venue
22 January 1999	Helsinki	Finland	Tavastia Club
13 February 1999	Turku	Finland	Feeniks Club
6 March 1999	Helsinki	Finland	Lepakko Club
31 March 1999	Tampere	Finland	Pakkahuone Theatre
10 April 1999	Nivala	Finland	Tuiskula Club
21 May 1999	Vantaa	Finland	Vernissa Club
22 May 1999	Lappajärvi	Finland	Halkosaari Club
27 May 1999	Lieksa	Finland	Brahesale Theater
28 May 1999	Joensuu	Finland	Silva Metsämessut
4 June 1999	Helsinki	Finland	Tavastia Club
5 June 1999	Somero	Finland	Sommerstock Festival
6 June 1999	Karis	Finland	Kattoparkkirock Fest
11 June 1999 (Note: The 11 June 1999, concert was a part of Eurastock.)	Eura	Finland	Sierahovi
12 June 1999	Kauhajoki	Finland	City Kasino
19 June 1999 (Note: The 19 June 1999, concert was a part of Provinssirock.)	Seinäjoki	Finland	Törnävä
24 June 1999 (Note: The 24 June 1999, concert was a part of Himos Festival.)	Jämsä	Finland	Himos Areena
25 June 1999	Kalajoki	Finland	Hiekkasärkkä Club
25 June 1999	Pudasjärvi	Finland	Jyrkkäkoski Club
26 June 1999 (Note: The 26 June 1999, concerts were a part of Nummirock Festival and Midnight Party Planet.)	Nurmijärvi	Finland	Nummijärvi
26 June 1999	Kouvola	Finland	Tykkimäki
3 July 1999	Eno	Finland	Kanavarantarock
7 July 1999 (Note: The 7 July 1999, concert was a part of Tammerfest.)	Tampere	Finland	Tullikamarin Pakkahuone
9 July 1999 (Note: The 9 July 1999, concert in Helsinki was a part of Tuska Open Air.)	Helsinki	Finland	VR Makasiinit
9 July 1999	Ruovesi	Finland	Noitarock
16 July 1999	Kiuruvesi	Finland	Liikuntahalli
18 July 1999 (Note: The 18 July 1999, concert was a part of Ilosaarirock.)	Joensuu	Finland	Laulurinne
30 July 1999	Liperi	Finland	Suvisouturock
31 July 1999	Utajärvi	Finland	Untorock
7 August 1999	Suomussalmi	Finland	Suviyön Sumutus
8 August 1999 (Note: The 8 August 1999, concert was a part of Ankkarock.)	Korso	Finland	Korson Urheilupuisto
14 August 1999	Lohja	Finland	Kesärock
14 August 1999	Salo	Finland	Vuoristock

Band

- Tarja Turunen – lead vocals
- Tuomas Holopainen – keyboards, lead vocals
- Emppu Vuorinen – guitar
- Jukka Nevalainen – drums
- Sami Vänskä – bass

== Oceanborn Europe Tour ==
Oceanborn Europe Tour
- Tour by Nightwish
- Location: Europe
- Associated album: Oceanborn
- Start date: November 12, 1999
- End date: December 12, 1999
- No. of shows: 25

Nightwish concert chronology
- Summer of Wilderness (1999); Oceanborn Europe Tour (1999); Wishmaster World Tour (2000–2001)

After gigging heavily across Finland until August 1999, the band was hired to support German band Rage across Europe after their Oceanborn album also charted in Germany. The two bands got along fine, but as the tour progressed Nightwish's popularity also grew, with people often leaving after Nightwish's set, which led to tensions between crews, with Nightwish's set soon being shortened, and also on the last dates, they were denied a soundcheck. Despite this, Nightwish enjoyed the tour which helped them to hone their act and grow tighter as a band.

Rage's drummer at the time, Mike Terrana, would eventually join Tarja's support band for her eventual solo career in 2007.

=== Set list ===
1. "Stargazers"
2. "Gethsemane"
3. "Passion and the Opera"
4. "Devil & the Deep Dark Ocean"
5. "Sacrament of Wilderness"
6. "Swanheart"
7. "The Pharaoh Sails to Orion"
8. "Walking in the Air" (Howard Blake cover)
9. "Elvenpath"
10. "Astral Romance"
11. "Know Why the Nightingale Sings"

=== Tour dates ===
List of 1999 concerts, showing date, city, country and venue
Date	City	Country	Venue
12 November 1999	Markneukirchen	Germany	Schützenhaus
13 November 1999	Katowice	Poland	Mega Club
14 November 1999	Spremberg	Germany	MTS Club
15 November 1999	Berlin	Germany	Kesselhaus
16 November 1999	Hamburg	Germany	Markthalle
18 November 1999	Groningen	Netherlands	Vera Club
19 November 1999	Osnabrück	Germany	Works Club
20 November 1999	Vosselaar	Belgium	Biebob Club
21 November 1999	Bochum	Germany	Zeche Club
22 November 1999	Saarbrücken	Germany	Garage Club
24 November 1999	Barcelona	Spain	Sala Mephisto
25 November 1999	Madrid	Spain	Sala Macumba
26 November 1999	Avilés	Spain	Quattro Club
27 November 1999	Bergara	Spain	Sala Jam
28 November 1999	Valencia	Spain	Garage Club
30 November 1999	Geneva	Switzerland	Undertown Club
1 December 1999	Pratteln	Switzerland	Z7 Club
2 December 1999	Turin	Italy	Supermarket Club
3 December 1999	Vienna	Austria	Planet Music
4 December 1999	Kaufbeuren	Germany	Zeppenlinhalle
6 December 1999	Offenbach	Germany	Hafenbahn Club
8 December 1999	Braunschweig	Germany	FBZ Club
9 December 1999	Cologne	Germany	Live Music Hall
10 December 1999	Bad Salzungen	Germany	Keller Werk
11 December 1999	Freiberg	Germany	Trivoli Club
12 December 1999	Ludwigsburg	Germany	Rockfabrik

Band

- Tarja Turunen – lead vocals
- Tuomas Holopainen – keyboards, lead vocals
- Emppu Vuorinen – guitar
- Jukka Nevalainen – drums
- Sami Vänskä – bass

== Wishmaster World Tour ==
Wishmaster World Tour
- Tour by Nightwish
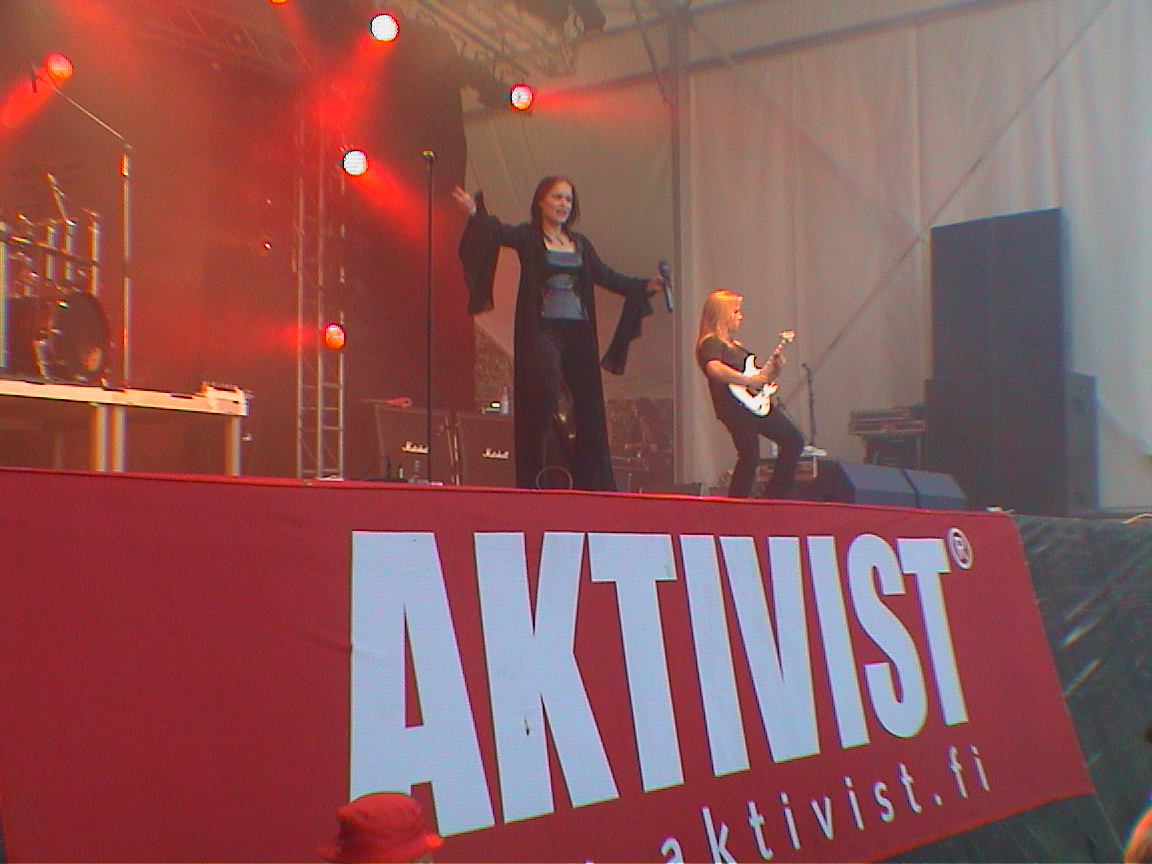
- Nightwish live at Ruisrock on July 7, 2001
- Location: Asia; Europe; North America; South America
- Associated album: Wishmaster
- Start date: May 15, 2000
- End date: September 15, 2001
- No. of shows: 86
- Supporting acts: Sinergy (EUR); Eternal Tears of Sorrow (EUR)

Nightwish concert chronology
- Oceanborn Europe Tour (1999); Wishmaster World Tour (2000–2001); World Tour of the Century (2002–2003)

The band's third studio album, Wishmaster, hit Number 1 in Finland and also charted in Germany and France, thus allowing the band to host a headlining world tour. In July, they became the second Finnish band to do a headlining tour in South America, after Stratovarius in 1996, where they enjoyed a huge popularity and attracted over 4 thousand people for their show in São Paulo, also becoming the first European band to play in Panama and later that year would be the first Finnish metal band to host shows in Canada. For their European tour between October and November, they were supported by Finnish death metal band Eternal Tears of Sorrow and supergroup Sinergy, whose bassist, Marko Hietala, would eventually join Nightwish. The last show of the year in Tampere was recorded and later released as From Wishes to Eternity, the first live DVD by a Finnish group.

In 2001, the band released the Over the Hills and Far Away EP and spend most of the year touring mostly in Finland, but also played headlining and festival dates in Europe, also performing in South Korea in a festival in front of over 50 thousand people. The last show of 2001 in the Finnish city of Nivala was also their last show with Sami Vänskä, later replaced by Hietala, and this was also the last tour where Holopainen sang lead vocals, with Hietala also taking over the lead male vocals after joining.

=== Set lists ===
2000

1. She Is My Sin"
2. Gethsemane"
3. The Kinslayer"
4. Deep Silent Complete"
5. The Pharaoh Sails to Orion"
6. Come Cover Me"
7. Wanderlust"
8. Crimson Tide" (Hans Zimmer cover) / Deep Blue Sea (Trevor Rabin cover) (medley, instrumental)
9. Swanheart"
10. "Elvenpath" / "FantasMic" (part 3)
11. "Dead Boy's Poem"
12. "Sacrament of Wilderness"
  Encore
13. "Walking in the Air" (Howard Blake cover)
14. "Beauty and the Beast"
15. "Wishmaster"

2001

1. The Kinslayer"
2. "She Is My Sin"
3. "10th Man Down"
4. "Elvenpath" / "FantasMic" (part 3)
5. "Over the Hills and Far Away" (Gary Moore cover)
6. "Come Cover Me"
7. "Deep Silent Complete"
8. "Sleeping Sun"
9. "Sacrament of Wilderness"
  Encore
10. "Walking in the Air" (Howard Blake cover)
11. "Wishmaster"

=== Tour dates ===
List of 2000 concerts, showing date, city, country and venue
Date	City	Country	Venue
15 May 2000	Vosselaar	Belgium	Biebob Club
20 May 2000	Kitee	Finland	Ice Hall
24 May 2000	Oulu	Finland	Woodoo Night Club
25 May 2000	Kuopio	Finland	Clone Club
26 May 2000	Mikkeli	Finland	ZicZac Club
27 May 2000	Imatra	Finland	Onnenpäivät Halle
31 May 2000	Helsinki	Finland	Nosturi
1 June 2000	Kouvola	Finland	Rubin 2000
2 June 2000	Tampere	Finland	Pakkahuone Theatre
3 June 2000	Virrat	Finland	Hiekkaranta Halle
12 June 2000 (Note: The 12 June 2000, concert was a part of Wave-Gotik-Treffen.)	Leipzig	Germany	Agra Messepark
22 June 2000 (Note: The 22 June 2000, concert was a part of Nummirock.)	Nurmijärvi	Finland	Nummijärvi
23 June 2000 (Note: The 23 June 2000, concert was a part of Eastpop.)	Joensuu	Finland	Laulurinne
24 June 2000 (Note: The 24 June 2000, concert was a part of Himos Festival.)	Jämsä	Finland	Himos Areena
1 July 2000 (Note: The 1 July 2000, concert was a part of Ruisrock.)	Turku	Finland	Ruissalo
7 July 2000 (Note: The 7 July 2000, concert was a part of Tuska Open Air.)	Helsinki	Finland	VR Makasiinit
8 July 2000 (Note: The 8 July 2000, concert was a part of Kirkastusjuhlat.)	Aitoo	Finland	Aitoon kirkastusjuhlat
9 July 2000 (Note: The 9 July 2000, concert was a part of Ilosaarirock.)	Joensuu	Finland	Ilosaari
14 July 2000	Curitiba	Brazil	Studio 1250
15 July 2000	São Paulo	Brazil	Tom Brazil
16 July 2000	Porto Alegre	Brazil	Opinião Club
19 July 2000	Santiago	Chile	Teatro Providencia
22 July 2000	Buenos Aires	Argentina	Alcatraz Club
25 July 2000	Panama City	Panama	Dali Club
28 July 2000	Guadalajara	Mexico	Roxy Club
29 July 2000	Mexico City	Mexico	Salon Ideal
30 July 2000	Morelia	Mexico	Arena
5 August 2000 (Note: The 5 August 2000, concert was a part of Wacken Open Air.)	Wacken	Germany	Hauptstrasse
1 September 2000	Tampere	Finland	Teatro Tullikamari
2 September 2000	Nivala	Finland	Tuiskula Club
8 September 2000	Uusikaupunki	Finland	Aquarius Club
9 September 2000	Lappajärvi	Finland	Halkosaari Club
15 September 2000	Helsinki	Finland	Tavastia Club
16 September 2000	Kauhajoki	Finland	City Kasino
22 September 2000	Jyväskylä	Finland	Lutakko Club
23 September 2000	Kuopio	Finland	Akateeminen Startti
5 October 2000	Hamburg	Germany	Markthalle
6 October 2000	Bremen	Germany	Tivoli Club
7 October 2000	Herford	Germany	Kreck Club
9 October 2000	Bochum	Germany	Zeche Club
10 October 2000	Frankfurt	Germany	Batschkapp
11 October 2000	Ludwigsburg	Germany	Rockfabrik
13 October 2000	Leipzig-Engelsdorf	Germany	Hellraiser Club
14 October 2000	Bad Salzungen	Germany	Kalle Werk
16 October 2000	Strasbourg	France	La Laiterie
17 October 2000	Lille	France	Le Splendid
18 October 2000	Paris	France	Élysée Montmartre
20 October 2000	Lyon	France	Teatro Rail
21 October 2000	Marseille	France	Jas de Rod
22 October 2000	Barcelona	Spain	Sala Mephisto
24 October 2000	Pratteln	Switzerland	Z7 Club
25 October 2000	Graz	Austria	Orpheum Theatre
26 October 2000	Vienna	Austria	Planet Music
28 October 2000	Wels	Austria	Alter Schlachthof
29 October 2000	Budapest	Hungary	E-klub
31 October 2000	Berlin	Germany	Razzle Dazzle
1 November 2000	Prague	Czech Republic	Palac Akropolis
4 November 2000	Kaufbeuren	Germany	Zeppelinhalle
5 November 2000	Vosselaar	Belgium	Biebob Club
7 November 2000	Amsterdam	Netherlands	Melkweg
8 November 2000	Braunschweig	Germany	FBZ Club
9 November 2000	Cologne	Germany	Live Music Hall
25 November 2000	Montreal	Canada	Le Medley
26 November 2000	Montreal	Canada	Le Medley
29 November 2000	Tampere	Finland	Pakkahuone Theatre

List of 2001 concerts, showing date, city, country and venue
Date	City	Country	Venue
27 January 2001	Levi	Finland	Hallo Poro Rock
2 February 2001	Nokia	Finland	Iisoppi Hotel
3 February 2001	Evijärvi	Finland	Nuorisoseuran Talo
5 February 2001	Stockholm	Sweden	GOOM-Cruise
7 February 2001	Turku	Finland	Feenix Club
8 February 2001	Helsinki	Finland	Tavastia Club
14 June 2001	Jyväskylä	Finland	Lutakko Club
16 June 2001 (Note: The 16 June 2001, concert was a part of Provinssirock.)	Seinäjoki	Finland	Törnävä
21 June 2001 (Note: The 21 June 2001, concert was a part of Midnight Party Planet.)	Kouvola	Finland	Tykkimäki
22 June 2001 (Note: The 22 June 2001, concert was a part of Nummirock.)	Kauhajoki	Finland	Nummijärvi
23 June 2001 (Note: The 23 June 2001, concert was a part of Himos Festival.)	Jämsä	Finland	Himos Areena
24 June 2001 (Note: The 24 June 2001, concert was a part of Vantarock.)	Vaasa	Finland	Vaasa Arena
7 July 2001 (Note: The 7 July 2001, concert was a part of Ruisrock.)	Turku	Finland	Ruissalo
8 July 2001 (Note: The 8 July 2001, concert was a part of Kirkastusjuhlat.)	Aitoo	Finland	Aitoon kirkastusjuhlat
12 July 2001 (Note: The 12 July 2001, concert was a part of Tammerfest.)	Tampere	Finland	Ratinanniemi
21 July 2001 (Note: The 21 July 2001, concert was a part of Roll Festival.)	Koria	Finland	Koria-rolli
4 August 2001 (Note: The 4 August 2001, concert was a part of Wacken Open Air.)	Wacken	Germany	Infield
5 August 2001	Pratteln	Switzerland	Z7 Konzertfabrik
6 August 2001	Vienna	Austria	Planet Music
7 August 2001 (Note: The 7 August 2001, concert was a part of Sziget Festival.)	Budapest	Hungary	Óbudai-Sziget
11 August 2001 (Note: The 11 August 2001, concert was a part of International Rock Festival.)	Busan	South Korea	Gwangalli Beach
24 August 2001	Moscow	Russia	Gorbunova Culture Club
25 August 2001	Saint Petersburg	Russia	LDM Center
1 September 2001 (Note: The 1 September 2001, concert was a part of Can You Festival.)	Helsinki	Finland	VR Makasiinit
6 September 2001	Turku	Finland	Feenix Club
7 September 2001	Tampere	Finland	Pakkahuone Theatre
8 September 2001	Alavus	Finland	Aulava Club
13 September 2001	Kuopio	Finland	Puijonsarvi Club
14 September 2001	Joensuu	Finland	Huvitörmä Club
15 September 2001	Nivala	Finland	Tuiskula Club

Band

- Tarja Turunen – lead vocals
- Tuomas Holopainen – keyboards, lead vocals
- Emppu Vuorinen – guitar
- Jukka Nevalainen – drums
- Sami Vänskä – Bass

== World Tour of the Century ==
World Tour of the Century
- Tour by Nightwish
- Location: Asia; Europe; North America; South America
- Associated album: Century Child
- Start date: June 22, 2002
- End date: September 27, 2003
- No. of shows: 58
- Supporting acts: After Forever (EUR); Charon (EUR)

Nightwish concert chronology
- Wishmaster World Tour (2000–2001); World Tour of the Century (2002–2003); Once Upon a Tour (2004–2005)

The band's second world tour was much shorter compared to others, before and after, due to many personal issues, including the birth of Hietala's twins and Turunen's studies in Germany. Still, their popularity was rising and allowed them to play successful South American and European tours in 2002 with a show for over six thousand people in São Paulo, also playing England and the United States for the first time in 2003, when they also played their first arena concerts in Germany. Dutch symphonic metal band After Forever and gothic metal band Charon were supporting acts for the band for the start of the European tour. After Forever's vocalist Floor Jansen would later join Nightwish as their singer in 2013.

=== Set lists ===
2002

1. "Bless the Child"
2. "End of All Hope"
3. "Come Cover Me"
4. "The Kinslayer"
5. "Dead to the World"
6. "Deep Silent Complete"
7. "10th Man Down"
8. "Crazy Train" (Ozzy Osbourne cover)
9. "Sacrament of Wilderness"
10. "Slaying the Dreamer"
11. "Beauty of the Beast"
12. "Over the Hills and Far Away" (Gary Moore cover)
  Encore
13. "Sleeping Sun"
14. "Beauty and the Beast"
15. "Wishmaster"

2003

1. "Bless the Child"
2. "End of All Hope"
3. "Come Cover Me"
4. "The Kinslayer"
5. "Dead to the World"
6. "Ever Dream"
7. "Sleeping Sun"
8. "The Pharaoh Sails to Orion" (featuring Tapio Wilska)
9. "Crazy Train" (Ozzy Osbourne cover)
10. "Beauty of the Beast"
11. "She Is My Sin"
12. "Slaying the Dreamer"
13. "Wishmaster"
  Encore
14. "Walking in the Air" (Howard Blake cover)
15. "Over the Hills and Far Away" (Gary Moore cover)

=== Tour dates ===
List of 2002 concerts, showing date, city, country and venue
Date	City	Country	Venue
22 June 2002 (Note: The 22 June 2002, concert was a part of Himos Festival.)	Jämsä	Finland	Himos Areena
23 June 2002	Jyväskylä	Finland	Tanssisali Lutakko
28 June 2002 (Note: The 28 June 2002, concert was a part of Bang Your Head!!!.)	Balingen	Germany	Messegelände
13 July 2002 (Note: The 13 July 2002, concert was a part of Tuska Open Air.)	Helsinki	Finland	Kaisaniemi
14 July 2002 (Note: The 14 July 2002, concert was a part of Ilosaarirock.)	Joensuu	Finland	Laulurinne
16 July 2002	Mexico City	Mexico	Circo Volador
17 July 2002	Santiago	Chile	Teatro Providencia
18 July 2002	Buenos Aires	Argentina	Hangar
20 July 2002	São Paulo	Brazil	Credicard Hall
21 July 2002	Brasília	Brazil	Camping Show
24 July 2002	Porto Alegre	Brazil	Opinião Club
26 July 2002	Curitiba	Brazil	Moinho São Roque
27 July 2002	Belo Horizonte	Brazil	Lapa Multi Show
28 July 2002	Rio de Janeiro	Brazil	ATL Hall
4 August 2002 (Note: The 4 August 2002, concert was a part of Ankkarock.)	Vantaa	Finland	Korson Urheilupuisto
5 August 2002 (Note: The 5 August 2002, concert was a part of Sziget Festival.)	Budapest	Hungary	Óbudai-Sziget
13 August 2002	Moscow	Russia	DK Gorbunova
16 August 2002	Helsinki	Finland	Tavastia Club
17 August 2002	Helsinki	Finland	Tavastia Club
20 August 2002	Antwerp	Belgium	Trix HofterLoo
22 August 2002	Dortmund	Germany	Westfalenhallen 2
23 August 2002 (Note: The 23 August 2002, concert was a part of Summer Breeze Open Air.)	Abtsgmünd	Germany	Festplatz
24 August 2002 (Note: The 24 August 2002, concert was a part of Metal Fest Wien.)	Vienna	Austria	Arena
27 August 2002	Hamburg	Germany	Große Freiheit
28 August 2002	Amsterdam	Netherlands	Paradiso
30 August 2002	Barcelona	Spain	Razzmatazz 1
31 August 2002	Bergara	Spain	Sala Jam
2 September 2002	Paris	France	Élysée Montmartre
3 September 2002	Cologne	Germany	Live Music Hall
4 September 2002	Tilburg	Netherlands	013
6 September 2002	Berlin	Germany	Columbiahalle
7 September 2002	Leipzig	Germany	Haus Auensee
14 November 2002	Stockholm	Sweden	Stora Arenan
15 November 2002	Stockholm	Sweden	Klubben

List of 2003 concerts, showing date, city, country and venue
Date	City	Country	Venue
11 January 2003	Oberhausen	Germany	König-Pilsener-Arena
12 January 2003	Munich	Germany	Le Zenith
4 June 2003	Helsinki	Finland	Stella Star Club
5 June 2003 (Note: The 5 June 2003, concert was a part of Summer Rocks.)	Budapest	Hungary	Petőfi Csarnok
7 June 2003 (Note: The 7 June 2003, concert was a part of PKO Open Air.)	Banská Bystrica	Slovakia	Amfiteáter
20 June 2003 (Note: The 20 June 2003, concert was a part of Raumanmeren Juhannus.)	Rauma	Finland	Otanlahti
4 July 2003	Oslo	Norway	Rockefeller Music Hall
5 July 2003	Oslo	Norway	Rockefeller Music Hall
11 July 2003 (Note: The 11 July 2003, concert was a part of Metalmania Festival.)	Villarrobledo	Spain	Auditorio Municipal
2 August 2003 (Note: The 2 August 2003, concert was a part of Gates of Metal.)	Hultsfred	Sweden	Folkets Park
9 August 2003 (Note: The 9 August 2003, concert was a part of M'era Luna Festival.)	Hildesheim	Germany	Flugplatz Hildesheim-Drispenstedt
15 August 2003 (Note: The 15 August 2003, concert was a part of Highfield Festival.)	Hohenfelden	Germany	Stausee
16 August 2003	Pratteln	Switzerland	Z7 Konzertfabrik
17 August 2003	Pratteln	Switzerland	Z7 Konzertfabrik
29 August 2003 (Note: The 29 August 2003, concert was a part of Lowlands Festival.)	Biddinghuizen	Netherlands	Evenemententerrein Walibi Holland
30 August 2003 (Note: The 30 August 2003, concert was a part of Bloodstock Open Air.)	Derby	England	Assembly Rooms
31 August 2003	London	England	Astoria 2
5 September 2003 (Note: The 5 September 2003, concert was a part of ProgPower USA.)	Atlanta	United States	Earthlink Live
6 September 2003	Montreal	Canada	Le Medley
7 September 2003	New York City	United States	L'Amours Brooklyn
9 September 2003	Mexico City	Mexico	Circo Volador
26 September 2003	Saint Petersburg	Russia	Yubileyny Sports Palace
27 September 2003	Moscow	Russia	Gorbunova Culture Club

Band

- Tarja Turunen – lead vocals
- Tuomas Holopainen – keyboards, lead vocals
- Emppu Vuorinen – guitar
- Jukka Nevalainen – drums
- Marko Hietala – bass, lead vocals

== Once Upon a Tour ==
The band's fifth studio album, Once, was their commercial breakthrough album, topping the charts in four European countries and entering the top 10 in other five countries, also becoming their first album to chart in the USA and in the UK, eventually selling 1 million copies until the end of 2005. It spawned two hit singles, "Nemo" and "Wish I Had An Angel".

The success of the album allowed the band to tour worldwide, hosting their first US Tour, playing for the first time in Australia and Japan, playing arena shows in Europe and stadium festival shows in South America, in a total of over 130 shows in two years. The last show, at Helsinki's Hartwall Areena, was later released as the End of an Era DVD.

This was their last tour with Tarja Turunen, fired after the last show in Helsinki.

== Dark Passion Play World Tour ==
Swedish singer Anette Olzon was announced as the new lead singer for Nightwish in May 2007, with the band's sixth studio album, Dark Passion Play, later being released in September that year. Between 2007 and 2008 the band played over 100 shows around the world, in Europe, Asia, Australia, North America and South America.

After a three month break, the band resumed touring in March 2009, a series of shows dubbed the "Deja Vu Tour", in European arenas and festivals and US clubs and theatres, with the last concert of the tour again at Helsinki's Hartwall Areena. A live EP, Made in Hong Kong was released in March 2009.

== Imaginaerum World Tour ==
In 2011, Nightwish released their seventh studio album, Imaginaerum, later released as a movie with the same name and its soundtrack. The band started touring in 2012, but during a North American tour in September, Anette Olzon was fired and quickly replaced by Dutch singer Floor Jansen, originally announced only as a live replacement for that specific tour.

Bye the end of the tour in 2013, both Jansen and Troy Donockley, who had been accompanying the band live and in studio since 2007, were made official members of the band. It was also the last tour with drummer Jukka Nevalainen, who retired from touring due to health issues. The show at Wacken Open Air on 3 August 2013 was released as the Showtime, Storytime DVD.

== Endless Forms Most Beautiful World Tour ==
During the recording of the band's eighth studio album, Endless Forms Most Beautiful, drummer Jukka Nevalainen announced his retirement from recording and touring with the band due to health issues, and Kai Hahto was announced as his replacement.

The band toured heavily between 2015 and 2016, with the concerts at the Ratina Stadium in Tampere and at the Wembley Arena in London later released as the Vehicle of Spirit DVD.

== Decades: World Tour ==
To celebrate their 20 year anniversary, the band released a compilation, Decades, and played a special tour across Europe, North America and South America in 2018. The band presented a special set list for this tour, featuring rare songs from the earlier era to revisit with some new twists. It is the final tour to feature Marko Hietala who later departed from the band in January 2021.

The show at the Estadio Malvinas in Argentina was later released as the Decades: Live in Buenos Aires DVD.

== Human. :II: Nature. World Tour ==
After releasing their ninth studio album, Human. :II: Nature, the first dates for the tour were announced for 2020, but were later postponed or canceled due to the COVID-19 pandemic. In January 2021, bassist Marko Hietala announced he was leaving the band due to personal and health issues, with Jukka Koskinen later joining the band as his replacement.

After two virtual shows watched online by over 150 thousand people in May 2021, the band was back on stage in July and toured until June 2023, concluding with two stadium shows in Finland. At the conclusion of the tour, the band began a touring hiatus which is set to last between 'two to three years' following the release of the band's tenth studio album, Yesterwynde. This was the final tour to feature lead vocalist Floor Jansen as she left the band in October 2026.
