= Lokikirja =

Box set by Nightwish
- Released: 18 November 2009
- Recorded: 1997–2007
- Genres: Symphonic metal, power metal

Nightwish chronology
| The Sound of Nightwish Reborn (2008) | Lokikirja (2009) | Walking in the Air: The Greatest Ballads (2011) |

Lokikirja is the fifth box set by the Finnish symphonic metal band Nightwish. It was released on 18 November 2009. This box set contains the remastered edition of Angels Fall First, the regular editions of the other six Nightwish studio albums, the Bless the Child single with bonus tracks, and the special edition of Over the Hills and Far Away. The album was in pre-order at the Nightwish-Shop website. "Lokikirja" is Finnish for "logbook".

== Track listing ==
- Angels Fall First:

1. Elvenpath
2. Beauty and the Beast
3. The Carpenter
4. Astral Romance
5. Angels Fall First
6. Tutankhamen
7. Nymphomaniac Fantasia
8. Know Why the Nightingale Sings
9. Lappi (Lapland)

- Oceanborn

1. Stargazers
2. Gethsemane
3. Devil and the Deep Dark Ocean
4. Sacrament of Wilderness
5. Passion and the Opera
6. Swanheart
7. Moondance
8. The Riddler
9. Pharaoh Sails to Orion
10. Walking in the Air
11. Sleeping Sun

- Wishmaster

1. She's my Sin
2. The Kinslayer
3. Come Cover Me
4. Wanderlust
5. Two for Tragedy
6. Wishmaster
7. Bare Grace Misery
8. Crownless
9. Deep Silent Complete
10. Dead Boy's Poem
11. Fantasmic
12. Sleepwalker

- Over the Hills and Far Away EP

1. Over the Hills and Far Away
2. 10th Man Down
3. Away
4. Astral Romance
5. The Kinslayer (live)
6. She's My Sin (live)
7. Sacrament of Wilderness (live)
8. Walking in the Air (live)
9. Beauty and the Beast (live)
10. Wishmaster (live)

- Century Child

1. Bless the Child
2. End of all Hope
3. Dead to the World
4. Ever Dream
5. Slaying the Dreamer
6. Forever Yours
7. Ocean Soul
8. Feel for You
9. Phantom of the Opera
10. Beauty of the Beast

- Bless the Child

1. Bless the Child
2. The Wayfarer
3. Come Cover Me (live)
4. Dead Boy's Poem (live)
5. Once Upon a Troubadour
6. A Return to the Sea
7. Sleepwalker
8. Nightquest

- Once

1. Dark Chest of Wonders
2. Wish I Had an Angel
3. Nemo
4. Planet Hell
5. Creek Mary's Blood
6. The Siren
7. Dead Gardens
8. Romanticide
9. Ghost Love Score
10. Kuolema Tekee Taiteilijan
11. Higher Than Hope

- Dark Passion Play

1. The Poet and the Pendulum
2. Bye Bye Beautiful
3. Amaranth
4. Cadence of Her Last Breath
5. Master Passion Greed
6. Eva
7. Sahara
8. Whoever Brings the Night
9. For the Heart I Once Had
10. The Islander
11. Last of the Wilds
12. 7 Days to the Wolves
13. Meadows of Heaven

== Charts ==
| Chart (2009) | Peak position |
|---|---|
| Finnish Albums Chart | 21 |

== Credits ==
- Tarja Turunen - lead vocals (on CD 1, 2, 3, 4, 5, 6 & 7)
- Anette Olzon - lead vocals (on CD 8)
- Tuomas Holopainen - keyboards and backing vocals
- Emppu Vuorinen - lead guitars, bass guitar (on CD 1), classic guitar (on CD 8)
- Jukka Nevalainen - drums
- Marko Hietala - bass guitar, backing vocals (on CD 5, 6, 7 & 8)
- Sami Vänskä - bass guitar (on CD 2, 3 & 4)
