= Walking in the Air: The Greatest Ballads =

Compilation album by Nightwish
- Released: May 27, 2011
- Recorded: 1997–2002
- Genre: Symphonic metal; power metal
- Length: 67:38
- Label: Drakkar

Nightwish chronology
Lokikirja (2009)	Walking in the Air: The Greatest Ballads (2011)	Decades (2018)

Alternative cover
- Finnish edition artwork

Walking in the Air: The Greatest Ballads is the sixth compilation album by the Finnish symphonic metal band Nightwish, released in 2011. It contains the "greatest ballads" from the first four albums, two of which are covers. The cover art was created by Andreas Marschall.

== Track listing ==
All lyrics are written by Tuomas Holopainen, except where noted; all music is composed by Holopainen, except where noted.

Walking in the Air: The Greatest Ballads track listing
No.	Title	Lyrics	Music	Original release	Length
1.	"Walking in the Air" (Howard Blake cover)	Blake	Blake	Oceanborn (1998)	5:28
2.	"Angels Fall First"			Angels Fall First (1997)	5:34
3.	"Sleepwalker" (heavy version)			B-side from "Deep Silent Complete" single (2000)	3:04
4.	"Sleeping Sun"			Non-album single (1999)	4:01
5.	"Dead Boy's Poem"			Wishmaster (2000)	6:47
6.	"Deep Silent Complete"			Wishmaster (2000)	3:57
7.	"Feel for You"			Century Child (2002)	3:54
8.	"The Phantom of the Opera" (Andrew Lloyd Webber cover)	Charles Hart; Richard Stilgoe; Mike Batt	Lloyd Webber	Century Child (2002)	4:09
9.	"Ocean Soul"			Century Child (2002)	4:14
10.	"Lagoon"			B-side from "Bless the Child" single (2002)	3:46
11.	"Swanheart"			Oceanborn (1998)	4:44
12.	"Two for Tragedy"			Wishmaster (2000)	3:51
13.	"A Return to the Sea"			Angels Fall First (1997)	5:46
14.	"Away"			Over the Hills and Far Away (2001)	4:32
15.	"Forever Yours"			Century Child (2002)	3:51
Total length:					67:38

== Personnel ==
- Tarja Turunen – Vocals
- Tuomas Holopainen – Keyboards
- Emppu Vuorinen – Lead guitar (all tracks), Acoustic guitar and Bass guitar (on tracks 2 and 13)
- Sami Vänskä – Bass guitar (on tracks 1, 3, 4, 5, 6, 11, 12, 14)
- Jukka Nevalainen – Drums and Percussion
- Marko Hietala – Bass guitar (on tracks 7, 8, 9, 10, 15), male vocals (on track 7, 8)

== Charts ==
Chart (2011)	Peak position
Austrian Albums (Ö3 Austria)	65
Finnish Albums (Suomen virallinen lista)	45
German Albums (Offizielle Top 100)	32
Swiss Albums (Schweizer Hitparade)	35
