= Decades: World Tour =

2018 concert tour by Nightwish

- Tour by Nightwish
- Promotional poster for the North American leg of the tour in March–April 2018
- Location: Europe; North America; South America
- Associated album: Decades
- Start date: March 9, 2018
- End date: December 15, 2018
- Legs: 4
- No. of shows: 82

Nightwish concert chronology
- Endless Forms Most Beautiful World Tour (2015–2016); Decades: World Tour (2018); Human. :II: Nature. World Tour (2021–2023)

Decades: World Tour (also referred to as Decades: World Tour 2018) was a concert tour by the Finnish symphonic metal band Nightwish, in support of their seventh compilation album, Decades.

The band included a special setlist for this tour, featuring rare songs from the earlier era to revisit with some new twists. The setlist was a 'one-off' and only performed on this tour. It is the final tour to feature longtime bassist/vocalist Marko Hietala who later departed from the band in January 2021.

The Buenos Aires show was recorded for their sixth live DVD known as Decades: Live in Buenos Aires which was released on December 6, 2019.

== Reception ==
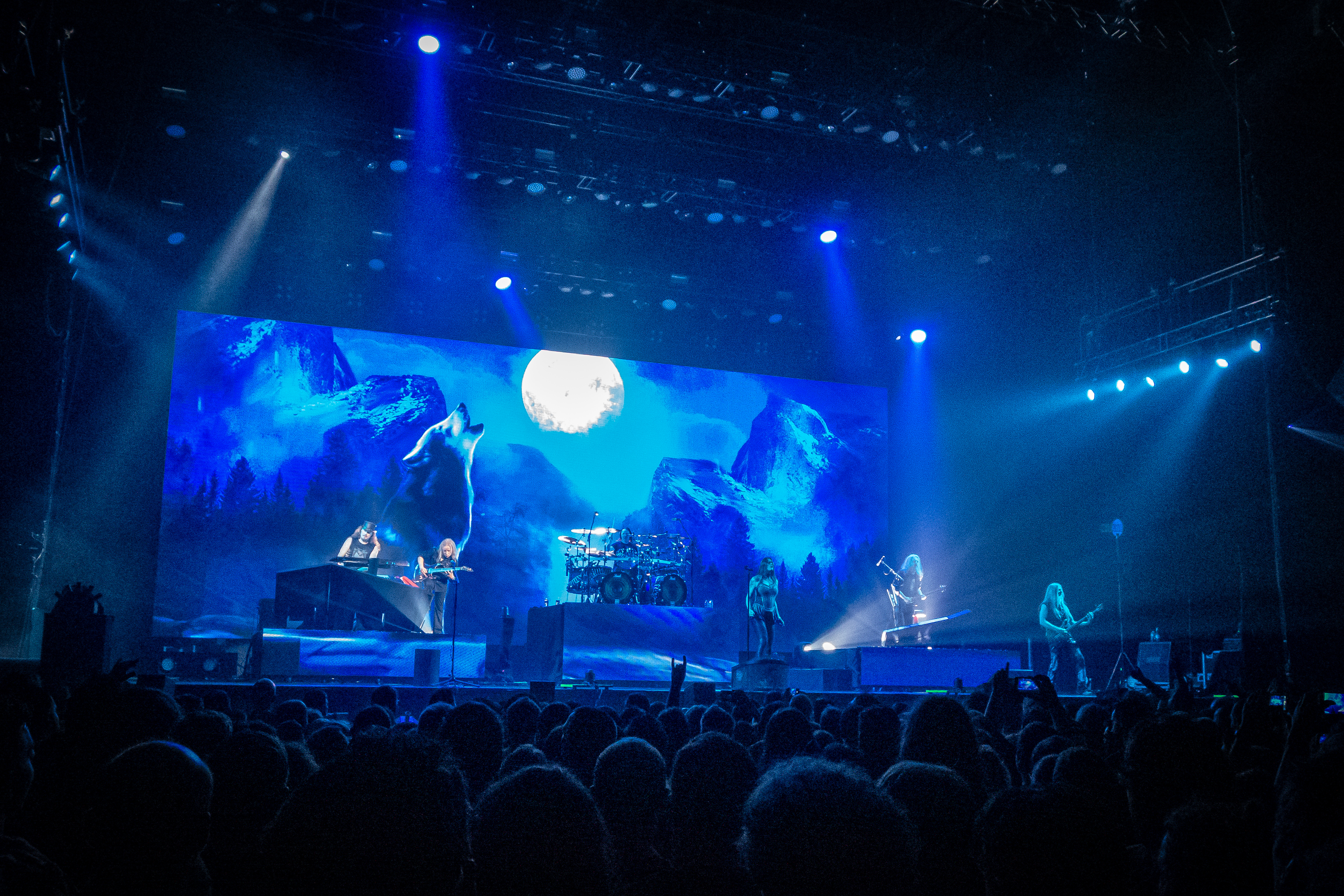
Nightwish performing in Geneva in November 2018

Jean-Frederic Vachon of Canadian website Diary of a Music Addict who attended the Montreal performance, praised Jansen's vocals which he said were powerful. He also praised the inclusion of the band's older material that hadn't been played for more than a decade, that it sounded much better than it did on the albums, and that the selection "did a great job covering Nightwish's entire career" and awarded the hardcore fans of Nightwish. Vachon also praised the newer songs, citing that they had gained an energy that lifted the band even higher.

Jovan Ristić of Hardwired Magazine, attending the Budapest show, praised the choice of including Beast in Black as the opening band in support for the band. Ristić noted on Jansen's vocals, citing them as "spectacularly versatile, easily moving between semi-growling, mellow and operatic vocals". He praised the powerful visual experience on the stage, as well as the pyro and confetti, which he cited "made the show firmly engraved in the minds of the audience". Ristić concluded his review by stating his confidence on what the future will hold for Nightwish, in which he said "it will be a bright one".

Katie Frost of AntiHero Magazine who was in attendance of the London performance, gave the performance a positive review, reflecting on the concert as "glorious and breathtaking" and that she was captivated. She noted the raised platforms, visual effects and the delighted crowds in attendance. She praised Jansen's vocals, citing them as "incredible".

== Set list ==
The following set list was performed at the Paramount Theatre in Denver, and is not intended to represent all of the shows on tour.

1. "Swanheart" (instrumental, played by Troy)
2. "End of All Hope"
3. "Wish I Had an Angel"
4. "10th Man Down"
5. "Come Cover Me"
6. "Gethsemane"
7. "Élan"
8. "Sacrament of Wilderness"
9. "Deep Silent Complete"
10. "Dead Boy's Poem"
11. "Elvenjig"
12. "Elvenpath"
13. "I Want My Tears Back"
14. "The Carpenter"
15. "The Kinslayer"
16. "Devil & the Deep Dark Ocean"
17. "Nemo"
18. "Slaying the Dreamer"
19. "The Greatest Show on Earth (Chapters I, II and III)"
20. "Ghost Love Score"

Other songs played throughout the tour

- "Amaranth"
- "Last Ride of the Day"
- "Dark Chest of Wonders"
- "Wishmaster"

== Tour dates ==
List of 2018 concerts, showing date, city, country, venue and support act(s)
Date	City	Country	Venue	Support Act(s)
March 9	Atlanta	United States	Tabernacle Hall	—N/a
March 10	Charlotte	United States	The Fillmore	—N/a
March 12	Norfolk	United States	NorVa Theatre	—N/a
March 13	Baltimore	United States	Modell Center	—N/a
March 14	New York City	United States	PlayStation Theater	—N/a
March 16	Philadelphia	United States	Electric Factory	—N/a
March 17	Worcester	United States	Palladium	—N/a
March 18	Albany	United States	The Egg	—N/a
March 20	Montréal	Canada	MTelus	—N/a
March 21	Toronto	Canada	Massey Hall	—N/a
March 23	Niagara Falls	United States	The Rapids Theatre	—N/a
March 24	Cleveland	United States	Agora Theatre	—N/a
March 25	Pittsburgh	United States	Stage AE	—N/a
March 26	Covington	United States	Madison Theater	—N/a
March 28	Kalamazoo	United States	State Theatre	—N/a
March 29	St. Louis	United States	Touhill Theatre	—N/a
March 30	Minneapolis	United States	Myth Live	—N/a
March 31	Chicago	United States	Aragon Ballroom	—N/a
April 2	Omaha	United States	Sokol Auditorium	—N/a
April 3	Denver	United States	Paramount Theatre	—N/a
April 5	Edmonton	Canada	Jubilee Auditorium	—N/a
April 6	Spokane	United States	Knitting Factory	—N/a
April 7	Vancouver	Canada	Queen Elizabeth Theatre	—N/a
April 8	Portland	United States	Roseland Theater	—N/a
April 10	Las Vegas	United States	Brooklyn Bowl	—N/a
April 12	Ventura	United States	Ventura Theatre	—N/a
April 13	San Jose	United States	City National Civic	—N/a
April 14	Anaheim	United States	City National Groove	—N/a
April 15	Tempe	United States	Marquee Theatre	—N/a
April 17	Dallas	United States	The Bomb Factory	—N/a
April 18	Memphis	United States	Minglewood Hall	—N/a
April 19	Mobile	United States	Saenger Theatre	—N/a
April 21	St. Petersburg	United States	Jannus Live	—N/a
April 22	Miami	United States	Olympia Theater	—N/a
May 18	Tallinn	Estonia	Saku Suurhall	—N/a
June 1 (Note: The June 1, 2018, concert was a part of Metalfest.)	Plzeň	Czech Republic	Amfiteátr Lochotín	—N/a
June 2 (Note: The June 2, 2018, concert was a part of FortaRock.)	Nijmegen	Netherlands	Goffertpark	—N/a
June 21 (Note: The June 21, 2018, concert was a part of Copenhell.)	Copenhagen	Denmark	Refshaleøen	—N/a
June 24 (Note: The June 24, 2018, concert was a part of Hellfest.)	Clisson	France	Val de Moine	—N/a
July 6 (Note: The July 6, 2018, concert was a part of Norway Rock Festival.)	Kvinesdal	Norway	Øyesletta	—N/a
July 13 (Note: The July 13, 2018, concert was a part of Ilosaarirock.)	Joensuu	Finland	Laulurinne	—N/a
July 21	Lahti	Finland	Mukkulan Tapahtumapuisto	Beast in Black; Timo Rautiainen
August 3 (Note: The August 3, 2018, concert was a part of Wacken Open Air.)	Wacken	Germany	Hauptstrasse	—N/a
August 7 (Note: The August 7, 2018, concert was a part of Stars in Town.)	Schaffhausen	Switzerland	Herrenacker	—N/a
August 9 (Note: The August 9, 2018, concert was a part of Leyendas del Rock.)	Villena	Spain	Polideportivo Municipal de Villena	—N/a
August 12 (Note: The August 12, 2018, concert was a part of Bloodstock Open Air.)	Walton-on-Trent	England	Catton Hall	—N/a
August 17 (Note: The August 17, 2018, concert was a part of Romexpo Open Air.)	Bucharest	Romania	Romexpo	Fallen Arise; A Tear Beyond
August 19 (Note: The August 19, 2018, concert was a part of Varna Mega Rock.)	Varna	Bulgaria	Varna Beach	—N/a
September 28	São Paulo	Brazil	Tom Brasil	Delain
September 30	Buenos Aires	Argentina	Microestadio Malvinas	Delain
October 2	Santiago	Chile	Teatro Caupolicán	Delain
October 4	Bogotá	Colombia	Teatro Royal Center	Delain
October 7	Mexico City	Mexico	Arena Ciudad de México	—N/a
November 2	Gothenburg	Sweden	Partille Arena	Beast in Black
November 3	Copenhagen	Denmark	Valby-Hallen	Beast in Black
November 5	Berlin	Germany	Max Schmeling Halle	Beast in Black
November 6	Hamburg	Germany	Barclaycard Arena	Beast in Black
November 7	Antwerp	Belgium	Lotto Arena	Beast in Black
November 9	Oberhausen	Germany	König Pilsener Arena	Beast in Black
November 10	Paris	France	AccorHotels Arena	Beast in Black
November 11	Geneva	Switzerland	SEG Geneva Arena	Beast in Black
November 13	Bratislava	Slovakia	Incheba Expo Arena	Beast in Black
November 14	München	Germany	Olympiahalle	Beast in Black
November 16	Leipzig	Germany	Leipzig Arena	Beast in Black
November 17	Kraków	Poland	Tauron Arena	Beast in Black
November 19	Prague	Czech Republic	O2 Arena	Beast in Black
November 20	Budapest	Hungary	Sports Arena	Beast in Black
November 22	Zürich	Switzerland	Hallenstadion	Beast in Black
November 23	Nuremberg	Germany	Nuremberg Arena	Beast in Black
November 24	Stuttgart	Germany	Schleyer-Halle	Beast in Black
November 26	Amsterdam	Netherlands	Ziggo Dome	Beast in Black
November 27	Saarbrücken	Germany	Saarlandhalle	Beast in Black
November 30	Madrid	Spain	WiZink Center	Beast in Black
December 1	Barcelona	Spain	Palau Sant Jordi	Beast in Black
December 2	Bilbao	Spain	Bizkaia Arena	Beast in Black
December 4	Milan	Italy	Mediolanum Forum	Beast in Black
December 5	Frankfurt	Germany	Festhalle	Beast in Black
December 8	London	England	Wembley Arena	Beast in Black
December 10	Birmingham	England	Arena Birmingham	Beast in Black
December 11	Manchester	England	Manchester Arena	Beast in Black
December 14	Turku	Finland	Gatorade Center	Beast in Black
December 15	Helsinki	Finland	Hartwall Arena	Beast in Black

== Personnel ==
- Floor Jansen – female vocals
- Tuomas Holopainen – keyboards
- Emppu Vuorinen – guitars
- Kai Hahto – drums
- Marko Hietala – bass, male vocals
- Troy Donockley – Uilleann pipes, tin whistle, bouzouki, additional vocals, additional guitars

Guest musicians

- Tapio Wilska – male vocals (performed "10th Man Down" and "Devil & the Deep Dark Ocean" at Ilosaarirock and Mukkula – July 13 and 21, 2018)
- Netta Skog – accordion (performed "Wishmaster" at Mukkula, Gatorade Center and Hartwall Arena – July 21, December 14 and 15, 2018)
- Yannis Papodopoulos – co-lead vocals (performed "Sahara" at O2 Arena – November 19, 2022)
