= Decades (Nightwish album) =

Compilation album by Nightwish
- Released: March 9, 2018
- Recorded: 1996–2015
- Genres: Symphonic metal; power metal
- Length: 141:31
- Label: Nuclear Blast
- Producers: Tuomas Holopainen; Tero Kinnunen; Nightwish

Nightwish chronology
Walking in the Air: The Greatest Ballads (2011)	Decades (2018)

Decades is the seventh compilation album by the Finnish symphonic metal band Nightwish, and contains remastered versions of the original material. It was released on March 9, 2018, which is the same day that they began touring for the Decades: World Tour. The track listing is presented in reverse chronological order.

== Track listing ==
All lyrics are written by Tuomas Holopainen; all music is composed by Holopainen, except where noted.

Disc one
No.	Title	Music	Original release	Length
1.	"The Greatest Show on Earth"	Holopainen; Marko Hietala	Endless Forms Most Beautiful (2015)	23:59
2.	"Élan"		Endless Forms Most Beautiful (2015)	4:47
3.	"My Walden"	Holopainen; Hietala	Endless Forms Most Beautiful (2015)	4:41
4.	"Storytime"		Imaginaerum (2011)	5:30
5.	"I Want My Tears Back"		Imaginaerum (2011)	5:11
6.	"Amaranth"		Dark Passion Play (2007)	3:57
7.	"The Poet and the Pendulum"		Dark Passion Play (2007)	13:54
8.	"Nemo"		Once (2004)	4:36
9.	"Wish I Had an Angel"		Once (2004)	4:02
Total length:				70:37

Disc two
No.	Title	Music	Original release	Length
1.	"Ghost Love Score"		Once (2004)	10:02
2.	"Slaying the Dreamer"	Holopainen; Emppu Vuorinen	Century Child (2002)	4:34
3.	"End of All Hope"		Century Child (2002)	4:23
4.	"10th Man Down"		Over the Hills and Far Away (2001)	5:29
5.	"The Kinslayer"		Wishmaster (2000)	4:09
6.	"Dead Boy's Poem"		Wishmaster (2000)	6:52
7.	"Gethsemane"		Oceanborn (1998)	5:22
8.	"Devil & the Deep Dark Ocean"		Oceanborn (1998)	4:46
9.	"Sacrament of Wilderness"	Vuorinen; Holopainen	Oceanborn (1998)	4:14
10.	"Sleeping Sun"		Oceanborn (1998)	4:33
11.	"Elvenpath"		Angels Fall First (1997)	4:42
12.	"The Carpenter"		Angels Fall First (1997)	6:00
13.	"Nightwish" (demo)		Nightwish Demo (1996)	5:48
Total length:				70:54

== Personnel ==
- Floor Jansen – lead vocals (tracks 1–3 on CD 1)
- Anette Olzon – lead vocals (tracks 4–7 on CD 1)
- Tarja Turunen – lead vocals (tracks 8 and 9 on CD 1, all tracks on CD 2)
- Tuomas Holopainen – keyboards, male vocals (track 12 on CD 2)
- Emppu Vuorinen – guitars, bass (tracks 11 and 12 on CD 2)
- Marko Hietala – bass (all tracks on CD 1, tracks 1–3 on CD 2), male vocals (tracks 1, 5, 7, and 9 on CD 1, track 2 on CD 2), backing vocals (track 2 and 3 on CD 1, track 3 on CD 2)
- Sami Vänskä – bass (on CD 2, tracks 4–10)
- Troy Donockley – Uilleann pipes, low whistle, bodhrán, bouzouki, male vocals (track 3 on CD 1), backing vocals (track 2 on CD 1)
- Kai Hahto – drums (tracks 1–3 on CD 1)
- Jukka Nevalainen – drums (tracks 4–9 on CD 1, all tracks on CD 2)

== Charts ==
=== Weekly charts ===
Chart (2018)	Peak position
Austrian Albums (Ö3 Austria)	19
Belgian Albums (Ultratop Flanders)	25
Belgian Albums (Ultratop Wallonia)	59
Czech Albums (ČNS IFPI)	11
Dutch Albums (Album Top 100)	68
Finnish Albums (Suomen virallinen lista)	1
French Albums (SNEP)	55
German Albums (Offizielle Top 100)	5
Hungarian Albums (MAHASZ)	24
Italian Albums (FIMI)	76
Polish Albums (ZPAV)	43
Portuguese Albums (AFP)	25
Scottish Albums (Official Charts)	34
Swiss Albums (Schweizer Hitparade)	7
UK Albums (Official Charts)	62
US Billboard 200	119
US Top Rock Albums (Billboard)	22

=== Year-end charts ===
Chart (2018)	Position
Swiss Albums (Schweizer Hitparade)	87
US Top Rock Albums (Billboard)	97
