= End of Innocence (video) =

Video by Nightwish
- Released: October 6, 2003
- Recorded: 2002–2003
- Genre: Symphonic power metal
- Length: 204:00
- Label: Spinefarm Records; Drakkar Entertainment
- Producer: Tero Kinnunen

Nightwish chronology
Century Child (2002)	End of Innocence (2003)	Once (2004)

End of Innocence is the second official DVD release of the Finnish symphonic metal band Nightwish. It features numerous clips of the band performing livetracks, including a recording of the band performing one of their first songs, "Beauty and the Beast", with bassist Marko Hietala performing the male vocal part (in the past this part was performed by Tuomas Holopainen or Tony Kakko, from Sonata Arctica).

However, unlike most music DVDs, the main portion of the disc is dedicated to the End of Innocence documentary (directed by Timo Halo), which involves a long interview with Tuomas Holopainen (keyboards), Jukka Nevalainen (drums) and Tapio Wilska (guest musician and friend of the band, also ex-vocalist of Finntroll), as well as several short clips of the band performing, playing pranks on support bands, recording in the studio and generally having fun.

It also contains a short intro song called "Kiteen Pallo" originally made for the Kiteen Pallo sports team, which could be found on the official Nightwish website as "kipa.mp3".

The limited edition includes a live CD, called Live at Summer Breeze 2002, which contains the tracks "End of All Hope", "Dead to the World", "10th Man Down", "Slaying the Dreamer", "Over the Hills and Far Away", "Sleeping Sun", "The Kinslayer" and "Come Cover Me".

== Track listing ==
1. End of Innocence documentary

- 1. "How It All Began"
- 2. "Tavastia Club, Backstage"
- 3. "Bless the Child"
- 4. "Tero's Duties"
- 5. "Caverock"
- 6. "First Steps"
- 7. "Heavier Sound"
- 8. "First Gigs"
- 9. "Oceanborn"
- 10. "Sami"
- 11. "Finnish Midsummer Activities"
- 12. "First Tour"
- 13. "The Duties of the Bass Player"
- 14. "Losing the Innocence"
- 15. "The Night Owl"
- 16. "South Korea"
- 17. "Unnecessary Footage..."
- 18. "Adventures in Russia"
- 19. "Wishmaster"
- 20. "Practical Jokes"
- 21. "Even More Unnecessary Footage..."
- 22. "Dead Boy's Poem / Slaying the Dreamer"
- 23. "South America"
- 24. "Century Child"
- 25. "Kitee by Night"
- 26. "What Makes Tuomas Tick?"
- 27. "No Balance"
- 28. "Slain Dreamer"
- 29. "Keeping the Innocence"
- 30. "The Innocent & Credits

2. Live footage: 4 July 2003 in Norway

- 1. "Sleeping Sun"
- 2. "Wild Child"
- 3. "Beauty and the Beast"
- 4. "She Is My Sin"
- 5. "Slaying the Dreamer"

3. Live footage: Summer Breeze Open Air 2002 (5.1 sound)

- 1. "End of All Hope"
- 2. "Dead to the World"
- 3. "10th Man Down"
- 4. "Slaying the Dreamer"
- 5. "Over the Hills and Far Away"
- 6. "Sleeping Sun"

4. Music videos

- 1. "End of All Hope"
- 2. "Over the Hills and Far Away"

5. MTV Brasil interview

6. Photo gallery

=== Sales and certifications ===
Country	Certification (sales thresholds)
Finland	Gold

== Credits ==
=== Band ===
- Tarja Turunen – lead vocals
- Tuomas Holopainen – keyboards
- Emppu Vuorinen – lead guitars
- Jukka Nevalainen – drums
- Marko Hietala – bass guitar and male vocals
- Sami Vänskä – bass guitar until 2001

=== Guests ===
- Tapio Wilska – in the documentary

=== Crew ===
- Tero Kinnunen – producer
- Mikko Karmila – mixing
- Timo Halo – director
- Mape Ollila – interview at the cottage
