= Evangelical Folk High School of Kitee =

Folk high school in Kitee, Finland

Coordinates: 62°05′45″N 30°08′20″E

- Kiteen Evankelinen Kansanopisto
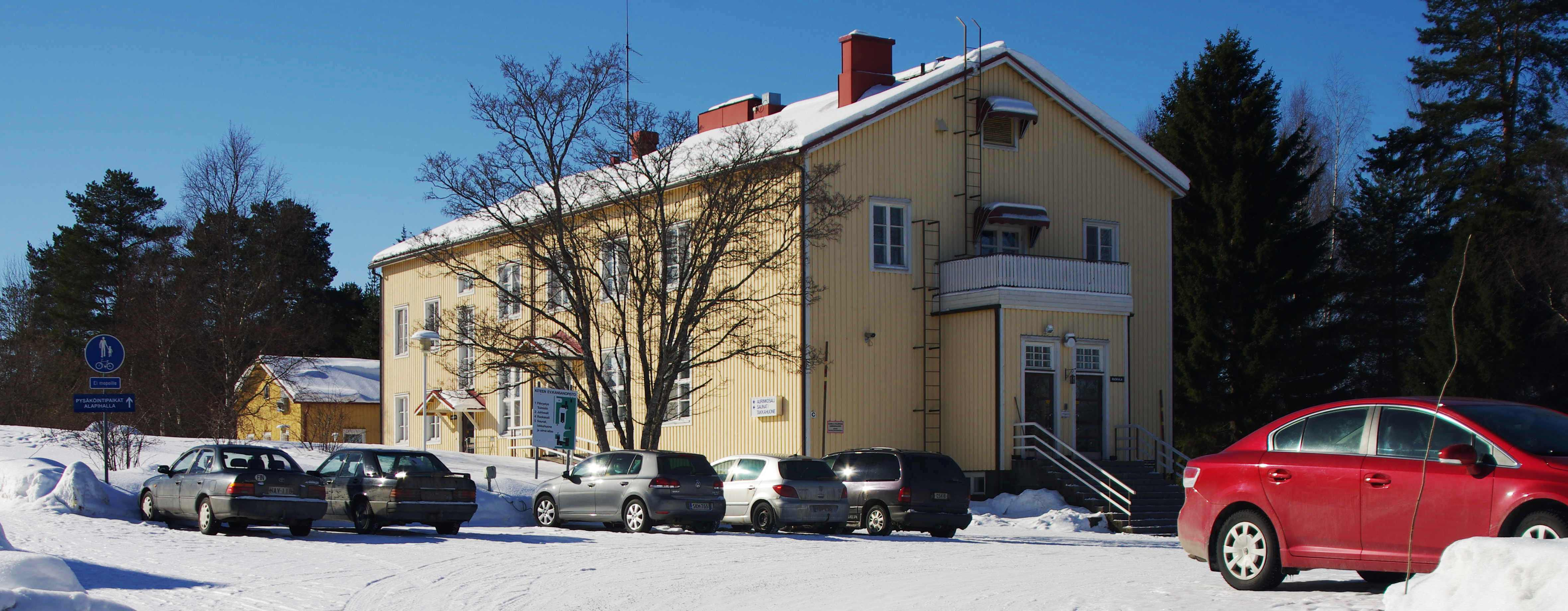
- Kitee; Finland

Information
- Website: www.kiteenkansanopisto.fi

The Evangelical Folk High School of Kitee (Finnish: Kiteen Evankelinen Kansanopisto) is an adult school located in Kitee, Finland.

Kiteen Kansanopisto is an Evangelical Folk High School in Kitee it is located in Eastern Finland, about 60 km south of Joensuu and about 80 km east of Savonlinna. Kiteen Kansanopisto is situated in the centre of Kitee close to supermarket, pharmacy, health centre and other services. The school offers a broad range of education for adults as well as summer camps for children or elderly people. There are about 250 students attending the long courses each year and about 1100 students attending the short courses. Most of the short courses are held in summertime, so the school has activities year-round. Evangelical Folk High School is recognized by the Finnish Ministry of Education and Culture and abides by its regulations. As a residential school, folk high school fosters a sense of community and wants to offer a viable alternative to help individuals fulfill their potential. The important principles in the learning process include promoting sustainable development, international and cultural awareness, equal rights with equal respect. The school has accommodation with various dormitories with facilities. Bathrooms, Sauna, kitchens and laundry rooms, it is possible for the student to live at the school during their studies. During the summer the accommodation is used for the children's camp and elderly camps.

== History ==
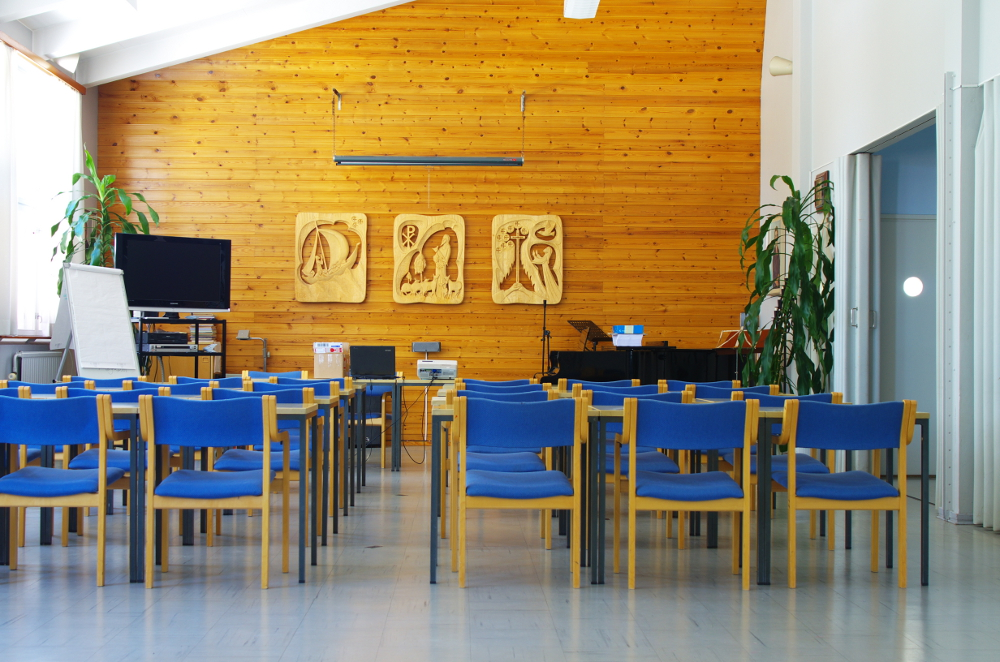
Auditorium

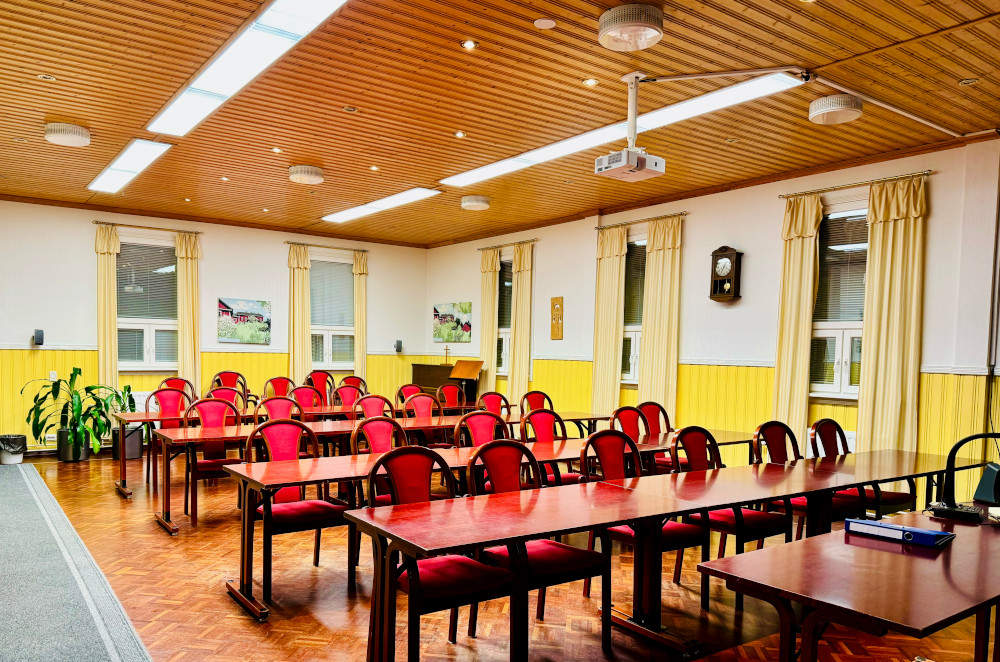
Solarium

The original foundation of the school was established in 1943 by Kalle Tiainen, the local church cantor. The first course started in 1946 with 36 students. Joose Hytönen was the first principal of the school.

The first building was built in 1947 by donations from local farmers. As of 2013, the school has four buildings with apartments, a swimming pool, a sauna, and classrooms.

== Teachers ==
There are a variety of courses and teachers are skilled in different areas. Most commonly known teachers are ex-Finnish baseball player Pasi Pirinen and music teacher Plamen Dimov. Plamen Dimov is called “the father of Nightwish” as he has taught and supported Tarja Turunen and Tuomas Holopainen at the early stages of their music career. He also played the violin on Nightwish's Oceanborn album.

== Education ==
Long-term Programs (Academic Year Courses):

- Integration Training (Kotoutumiskoulutus)
- Restoration and Upholstery
- Relaxation Therapy
- Kalevala-style Joint Treatment
- Pathway to Studies
- Family Caregiver Training

Short Courses

The institute also offers short courses and various camps, such as:

- Spiritual Courses
- Information Technology
- Health and Wellness
- Skating
- Music
- Handicrafts
- Additional Training for Family Caregivers
- Summer Activities for Children
- Languages and Cultures
- Other Short Courses

General Education

- Basic Education for Adults
- Preparatory Education for Upper Secondary (TUVA)
- Youth Academic Year "Nuoppis" (Youth Development Program)

== Summer camps ==
- International science camps
- Music camps
- Ice hockey
- Ice skating
- Various events
