= Ever Dream =

2002 single by Nightwish

Single by Nightwish

from the album Century Child
- B-side: "The Phantom of the Opera" (Andrew Lloyd Webber cover); "The Wayfarer"
- Released: 3 May 2002
- Recorded: 2002
- Studio: Caverock, Kitee, Finland; Finnvox, Helsinki, Finland
- Genre: Symphonic metal
- Length: 4:43
- Label: Spinefarm
- Songwriter: Tuomas Holopainen
- Producers: Nightwish; TeeCee Kinnunen

Nightwish singles chronology
"Deep Silent Complete" (2000)	"Ever Dream" (2002)	"Bless the Child" (2002)

"Ever Dream" is the sixth single by the Finnish symphonic metal band Nightwish. Released as the lead single from the band's fourth studio album, Century Child, it was the group's first single release in two years, following "Deep Silent Complete" in 2000.

The song is of a more operatic nature than later works and the music itself is more on the heavy metal side. It still being played live since 2002 until today. "Ever Dream" was certified with Gold Disc in Finland two days after release, with more than 5,000 sold copies, and later got Platinum Disc with more than 10,000 sold copies.

== Live performances ==
In live performances of the song, the intro is played differently, with only the keyboard and vocals present for the first verse, before all the band comes in after the intro.

"Ever Dream" was written for the voice of Tarja Turunen. She sang the song less operatically than earlier songs, such as "Sacrament of Wilderness". Nightwish still played it live with Anette Olzon, who replaced Turunen in 2007, and currently with Floor Jansen. Olzon changed some notes in the performances to better fit her vocal range and style, for instance: she sings the chorus in a less operatic style.

"Ever Dream" was the demo recorded by Olzon and sent to the band as her audition to replace Turunen.

When asked about her favorite song from Nightwish's first albums, Olzon said:

All the songs from the new album Dark Passion Play, "Ever Dream" and "Higher Than Hope".

== Reception ==
According to analysis by Charris Efthimiou, a Greek musicologist, "Ever Dream" is a prime example of how Nightwish blends emotional depth with complex musical structures. The song's lyrics convey a sense of longing and desire, which is amplified by the orchestral arrangements and dynamic shifts in the music.

In "Once Upon a Nightwish", Mape Ollila discusses the recurring themes in Nightwish's music, including the interplay between fantasy and reality. "Ever Dream" exemplifies this by creating a dreamlike atmosphere through its lyrical content and musical composition.

In 2018, Anna Svetlova explored the romantic and poetic elements in Nightwish's music, with "Ever Dream" serving as a key example. Similarly, J. Kaaresalo's research on the religious themes in Nightwish's work highlights the spiritual undertones present in "Ever Dream", the song's intricate orchestration and powerful vocals have made it a standout track in Nightwish's discography.

== Track listing ==
1. "Ever Dream" – 4:43
2. "The Phantom of the Opera" (Andrew Lloyd Webber cover) – 4:09
3. "The Wayfarer" (non-album track) – 3:25

== Sales and certifications ==
Country	Certification (sales thresholds)
Finland	Platinum

== Personnel ==
- Tarja Turunen – Lead vocals
- Emppu Vuorinen – Guitars
- Marko Hietala – Bass guitar, male vocals
- Tuomas Holopainen – Keyboards
- Jukka Nevalainen – Drums
