= Timo Rautiainen =

Timo Rautiainen may refer to:

- Timo Rautiainen (co-driver) (born 1964), Finnish rally co-driver
- Timo Rautiainen (musician) (born 1963), Finnish heavy metal singer
