= From Wishes to Eternity =

Video by Nightwish
- Released: April 2001 (Finland)
- Recorded: 29 December 2000
- Genre: Power metal
- Length: 79:55
- Label: Spinefarm Records; Drakkar Entertainment; Century Media
- Producer: Tero Kinnunen

Nightwish live album chronology
From Wishes to Eternity (2001)	End of an Era (2006)

Professional ratings
Review scores
Source	Rating
Sputnikmusic	4.5/5 stars

From Wishes to Eternity – Live is a live DVD/VHS/CD by the Finnish symphonic metal band Nightwish. It was recorded in Tampere, Finland on 29 December 2000. The CD was released as a limited edition of 10.000 copies, available only in Finland. In late 2005, Spinefarm managed to release it in Europe. In addition to a show of Nightwish material, the band also performed a medley, "Crimson Tide, Deep Blue Sea", which borrowed melodies from Hans Zimmer's music in the 1995 film Crimson Tide and Trevor Rabin's music in the 1999 film Deep Blue Sea.

On 1 March 2004 Drakkar released From Wishes to Eternity as SACD, a hybrid disc which can be played on normal CD players while SACD players give higher fidelity. The instrumental song "Crimson Tide, Deep Blue Sea" and "FantasMic" had to be removed from the track list to fit the concert on the disc. Later in 2004, the SACD version won the Gold Disc in Finland with more than 20,000 copies sold.

== Content ==
=== Track listing ===
1. "The Kinslayer"
2. "She Is My Sin"
3. "Deep Silent Complete"
4. "The Pharaoh Sails to Orion"
5. "Come Cover Me"
6. "Wanderlust"
7. "Crimson Tide/Deep Blue Sea"
8. "Swanheart"
9. "Elvenpath"
10. "FantasMic (Part 3)"
11. "Dead Boy's Poem"
12. "Sacrament of Wilderness"
13. "Walking in the Air"
14. "Beauty & the Beast"
15. "Wishmaster"

=== Bonus material ===
The DVD also includes:

- Two official videos ("The Carpenter" and "Sleeping Sun")
- Two live videos ("The Kinslayer" and "Walking in the Air)
- Deleted scenes
- Interviews with Tarja and Tuomas

=== Sales and certifications ===
Country	Certification (sales thresholds)
Finland	Platinum

== Credits ==
Nightwish

- Tarja Turunen – lead vocals
- Tuomas Holopainen – keyboards
- Emppu Vuorinen – guitars
- Jukka Nevalainen – drums
- Sami Vänskä – bass guitar

Additional musicians

- Tapio Wilska – vocals (on track 4)
- Tony Kakko – vocals (on track 14)
