= Lyijykomppania =

Finnish heavy metal band

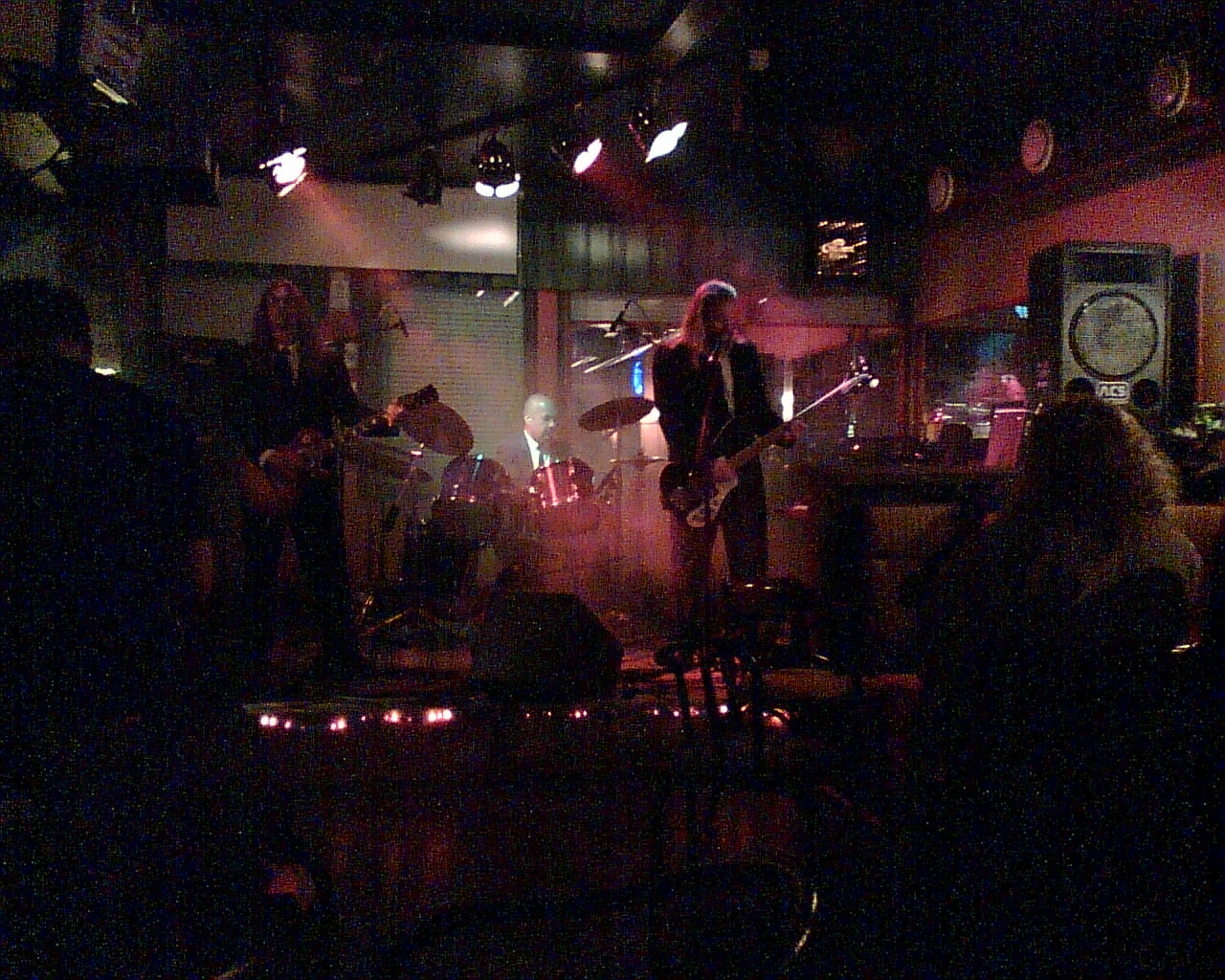
- Lyijykomppania in 2006

Background information
- Origin: Haukivuori, Finland
- Genres: Heavy metal, doom metal
- Years active: 1981–1983, 1990–1998, 2003–present
- Labels: Bassmania Records (1991–1993), RAM Disc (1994–present)
- Members: Tero Vuorinen; Petri Lindström
- Website: lyijykomppania.com

Lyijykomppania (English: "Lead Company") is a Finnish heavy metal band. It was originally formed in 1981 by guitarist and vocalist Timo Rautiainen and drummer Esa Moilanen but was disbanded a short two years later in 1983.

The band regrouped and started again with the original lineup in 1990 and remained together until once again breaking up in 1998 with guitarist and vocalist Timo Rautiainen and bassist Arto Alaluusua leaving to form the more well known band Timo Rautiainen & Trio Niskalaukaus.

The band got back together in 2003, by the only original member drummer Esa Moilanen. Joining Moilanen were bass guitarist and vocalist Jarkko Strandman and guitarist Petri Lindström. Jarkko Strandman left the group in 2006, leaving Lindström as the sole guitarist. Petteri Virtanen was hired as a new bass guitarist and vocalist in the summer of 2006.

Petri Lindström left the band in 2008 and has since been featured on bands and projects like Saturn Twilight, Progeland and Corvus Stone. Later Lindström rejoined the band.

The current lineup features Tero Vuorinen on guitar and vocals and Petri Lindström on bass guitar.

== Members ==
=== Current members ===
- Tero Vuorinen – vocals and guitar (2016–present)
- Petri "Lemmy" Lindström – bass and guitar (1996–2008, 2013–present)

=== Former members ===
- Esa Moilanen – drums (1981–2022)
- Timo Rautiainen – vocals and guitar (1981–1996)
- Jarkko Strandman – vocals and guitar (1996–2006, 2015)
- Olli Jaatinen – bass (1981–1992)
- Tapio Wilska – bass (1993)
- Arto Alaluusua – bass (1994–1996)
- Petteri Virtanen – bass and vocals (2006–2012)
- Joni Rossi – guitar (2007–2012)

== Discography ==
=== Albums ===
- Uimakoulu (transl. 'Swimming school') (1993)
- Viimeinen voitelu (transl. 'Anointing of the Sick') (1996)
- Harmaita säveliä (transl. 'Grey tones') (2005)
- Sota Nälkä Rutto Kuolema (transl. 'War, Hunger, Plague, Death') (2010)
- Tietoja epäonnistumisista ja päättämättömyyksistä, tai Väkivaltaa ja vääriä lääkkeitä (trans. 'Information about the failures and indecisions, or Violence and wrong medicines') (2018)

=== Singles ===
- Ohjelmanjulistus (1993)
- Helsinki tulessa! / Isä heiluu kirveellä (2017)
- A R T / Yksinäisen tähden harhailija (2019)

=== EPs ===
- Synkkää jynkytystä (1991)
- Suden hetki (1994)
- Kehitys kulkee perse edellä (2004)
- Mennyt maailma (2007)

=== Compilations ===
- Lyijykomppania (1993)
