= Obscene Eulogy =

Canadian death/black metal band

- Origin: Saint John, New Brunswick, Canada
- Genres: Blackened death metal Death metal Black metal
- Years active: 1999–present
- Label: Independent
- Members: Disease (Jamie Vautour) - guitar, bass N. - guitar, bass, effects, eyboards Tapio Wilska - vocals
- Past members: Mika Luttinen - vocals

Obscene Eulogy is a Canadian death/black metal band from Saint John, New Brunswick. The band recorded with Impaled Nazarene's Mika Luttinen on vocals. Their current singer is Tapio Wilska of Finntroll.

== History ==
Beginning in 2002, singer Mika Luttinen, guitarist Jamie "Disease" Vautour, and bassist and multi-instrumentalist "N." formed Obscene Eulogy and released three albums. Their third album, Defining Hate, included guest musicians Killjoy and Wilska van Fintroll.

The band appeared on the compilation album Firebox Sampler Vol. 1.

== Members ==
=== Current members ===
- Disease (Jamie Vautour) - guitar, bass
- N. - guitar, bass, effects, keyboards
- Tapio Wilska - vocals

=== Past members ===
- Mika Luttinen - vocals

== Discography ==
- A Portal into Fire (Demo, 2002)
- A Portal into Fire (EP, 2003)
- Defining Hate: The Truth Undead (Album, 2004)
