= Once Upon a Nightwish =

2006 biography by Mape Ollila

Once Upon a Nightwish: The Official Biography 1996 - 2006
- Author: Mape Ollila
- Language: English, Finnish
- Genre: Autobiography
- Publisher: Like Kustannus Oy (Finland); Deggael Communications, Bazillion Points Publishing (USA)
- Publication date: May 11, 2006
- English publication date: April 11, 2007
- Media type: print (hardback & paperback)
- Pages: 329 pages
- ISBN: 0-9796163-2-8
- OCLC: 276332971
- Followed by: Dark Passion Gallery (2008)

Once Upon a Nightwish: The Official Biography 1996 – 2006 is a 2006 biography originally written in Finnish by Mape Ollila, telling the first ten years of the Finnish symphonic metal band Nightwish. The book was translated into English in 2007. An enhanced, more polished English edition was published by Bazillion Points Books at the very end of 2008.

Ollila tells the story of Nightwish from the first ideas of a band in 1996 until the bombastic concert in Hartwall Areena in Helsinki, after which the lead singer Tarja Turunen was fired in an open letter by the band. The book is based on Ollila's own experiences with the band as well as exclusive interviews with the members, their families and their friends. The book is remarkable as a rock biography both because Ollila's portrayal is very sensitive to the subjects without sugar-coating their foibles, and because he was granted such full cooperation by a still-active band.

== Lawsuit ==
In November 2009, Marcelo Cabuli, Turunen's husband, filed a lawsuit against Ollila and Like Kustannus Oy, the book's original Finnish publisher, for libel.

On December 12, 2011, the Court in the district of Helsinki, Finland dismissed charges of defamation in relation to content of the authoritative book on the Finnish band Nightwish. The Court ruled that the book does not adversely affect Cabuli's work or his reputation in South America. Moreover, the Court determined that "Ollila does not portray Marcelo Cabuli in a malicious way." As a writer, Ollila was entitled to report what people familiar with Nightwish said in interviews, said the Court.
