= Timo Rautiainen (musician) =

Finnish singer and guitarist

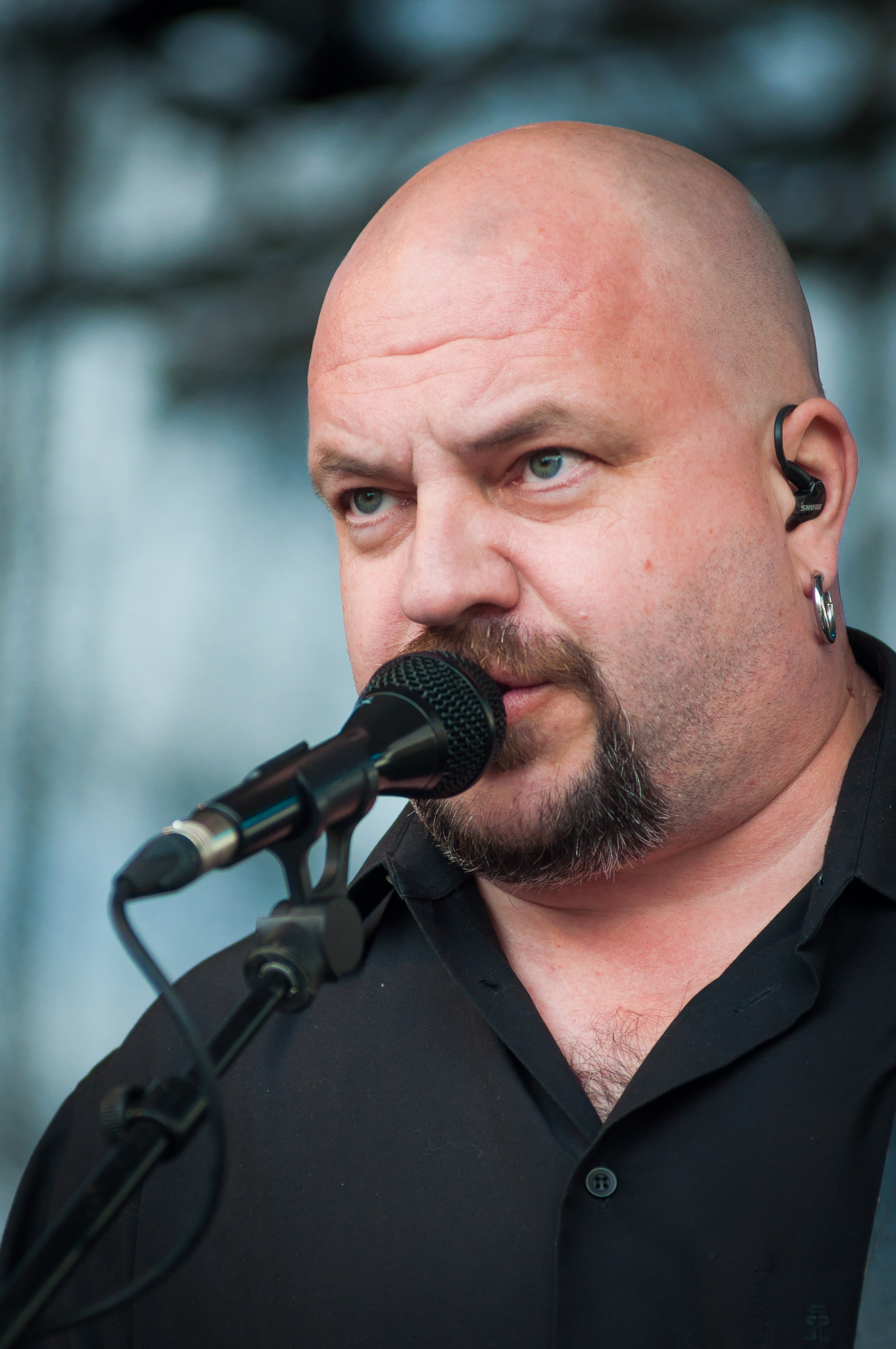
- Timo Rautiainen at Rakuunarock festival in 2013

Background information
- Born: 25 January 1963 (age 63); Sulkava, Finland
- Genres: Heavy metal, hard rock
- Occupation: Musician
- Instruments: Vocals, guitar
- Years active: 1981–present
- Website: timorautiainen.com

Timo Aulis Rautiainen (born 25 January 1963 in Sulkava) is a Finnish heavy metal musician. He is best known as the singer and songwriter of Timo Rautiainen & Trio Niskalaukaus. He has also sung and played guitar in the bands Lyijykomppania and Aku Ankkuli.

== Career ==
Rautiainen graduated from the University of Jyväskylä as a teacher of special education. In the early stages of Trio Niskalaukaus, Rautiainen was commonly represented in the main media as "The Grim Teacher", because of his strong and rather gloomy lyrics and his occupation. However, in later years he concentrated solely on his musical career, resigning from his educational activities. Despite his earlier and solemn representation in Finnish media, he is actually a man with a good sense of humour, and he is characterized by his laid back nature on stage.

In December 2004, Timo Rautiainen & Trio Niskalaukaus announced that they would be going on break for an indefinite period. While the band was on hiatus, Rautiainen starred on the Finnish talk-show K-Rappu, which concentrated on culture. On 1 November 2006, Trio Niskalaukaus announced that they would be breaking up.

After the breakup, Rautiainen published his first solo album titled Sarvivuori in 2006 with a crew gathered from different bands. The album featured the talents of Nightwish founder Tuomas Holopainen (who also wrote one song) and former Children of Bodom guitarist, Alexander Kuoppala. On drums debuted Finnish actor Jussi Lampi.

Initially Rautiainen was supposed to do only one solo album, but after the album's good reception and the band's highly successful summer tour he changed his mind. In 2007 his second solo album, Loppuun ajettu, was released. The line-up changed a bit, and Jarkko Petosalmi, former Trio Niskalaukaus guitarist, joined Rautiainen's solo band. The album entered the Finnish charts at #5 in its first week.

== Discography ==
=== Albums ===
- 2006: Sarvivuori (The Horn Mountain)
- 2007: Loppuun ajettu (Used to the End)
- 2010: En oo keittäny enkä myyny (I Haven't Made, Neither Sold Booze)
- 2012: Kunnes elämä meidät erottaa (Until Life Do Us Part) (with Neljäs Sektori)

=== EPs ===
- 2006: Uskonnonpastori EP (The Pastor of Religion)

=== Singles & EPs ===
- 2006: "Punainen viiva" (The Red Line)
- 2006: "Sinulle" (For You)
- 2007: "Outolintu" (Mockingbird)
- 2008: "Rööperi"
- 2010: "Bacchuksen tiellä"
