= Plamen Dimov (musician) =

Plamen Dimov Пламен Димов
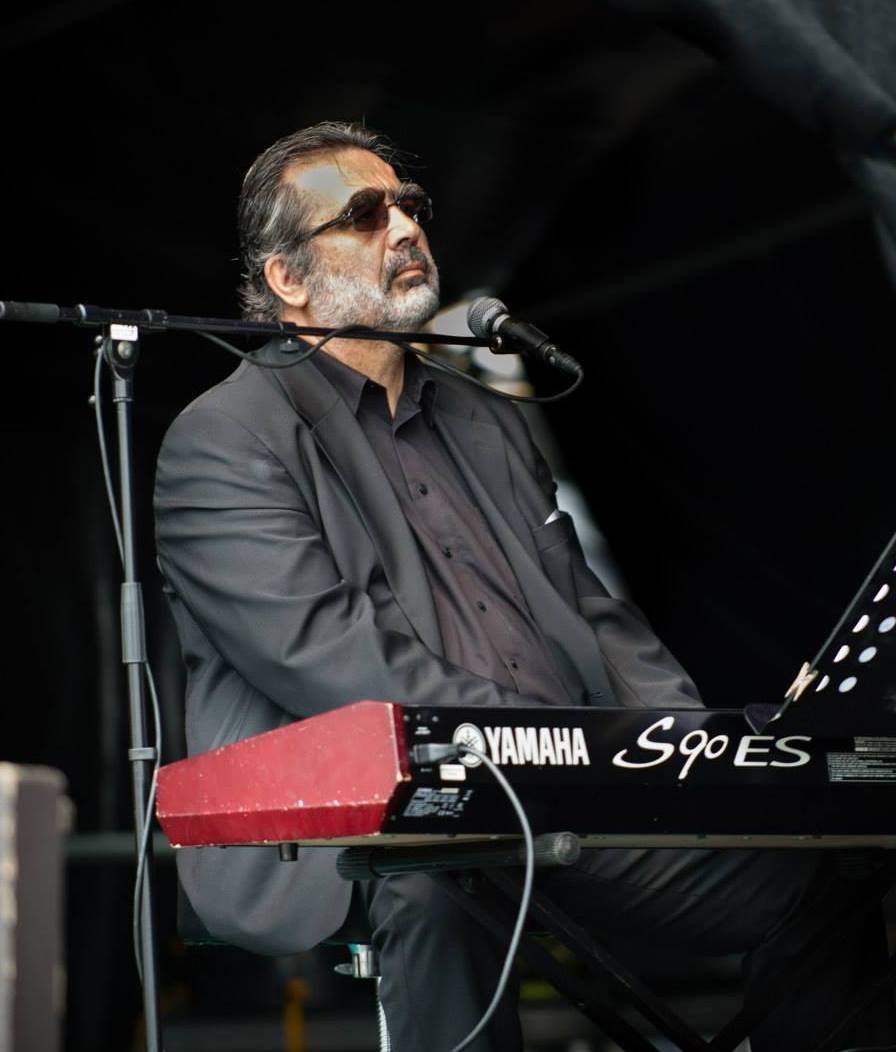

Background information
- Born: 19 June 1955 (age 70); Plovdiv, Bulgaria
- Occupation(s): Musician, music teacher, producer
- Instrument(s): Violin, piano, guitar, bass

Plamen Dimov (Bulgarian: Пламен Димов, born 1955 in Plovdiv, Bulgaria) is a musician and a music teacher. He is a graduate of the National School of Music and Dance Arts "Dobrin Petkov", Plovdiv, where he studied violin under the tutelage of Garo Baltayan. He went on to study Music Education at the Academy of Music, Dance and Fine Arts, Plovdiv. He spent the years after his graduation touring Europe with Bulgarian bands Montana Band and Alibi. In 1986, Dimov settled in Finland and started a family. His wife, Leena, is Finnish, and they have three children, Nikolai, Iida and Lidia.

Dimov has a philosophy that "you should never be satisfied with what your teachers tell you, you should seek your own truths". He firmly believes in "hard work as a means of gaining experience".

He has formed and instructed more than 80 bands. He teaches jazz-rock singing, jazz piano, band playing and violin in three schools in Kitee, Finland. He discovered and supported one of the most well-known Finnish bands, Nightwish; all the founding members, including Tarja Turunen, one of Finland's most famous singers, were among his pupils. Many others – Niina Sallinen, Oona Harinen, Sara Kurkola, Vanessa Kautto, Emma Nenonen, Severi Koivuniemi, Joonas Tuuri, Jesse Ojajärvi and others – have reached the finals of various talent shows and competitions such as Idols and The Voice of Finland.

One of Plamen Dimov's many projects is "Kitee International Music and Art Week", a workshop for talented young musicians and artists from all over the world. Dimov is well known for his work with and support for young musicians. He has produced several albums for charity. He says: "The diamonds of Finland are not lakes landscape and Nokia – the real diamonds are the young people, our hope for tomorrow."

== Partial discography ==
- Brass Band – Chameleon (1995) (piano, bass, producer)
- Jimmie Lawson and Friends – Play That Funky Humppa Music (1996) (piano, bass, producer)
- Nightwish – Oceanborn (1998) (violin)
- Heidi Sandström – Night and Day (1998) (bass, producer)
- Montun Arkielämää – Kokoelmalevy (compilation) (2005) (piano, bass, producer)
- The Voice – Mie ja sie (2005) (band leader, producer)
- Niina – "Theme from Swanheart" (single) (2006) (piano, producer)
- Kitee 375 v. – Kokoelmalevy (compilation) (2007) (producer)
- Wana – Gone (2009) (producer)
- Montun Henki (2011) (producer)
- Musiikkia Näytelmästä Pajari (2011) (producer)
- Ilman Partaa – Lee (2010) (producer)
- Unity-project (2011) (producer)
- Oiva Gröhn – Minun laulut (player, producer)
- Oiva Gröhn – Maininkien matkassa (player, producer)
- Niina Sallinen – Swanheart (player, producer)
- Brass Band – Riihivalkea Jazz (live album) (player, producer)
- Burnclear – Eventide
- Teuvo Pesonen – Timo Hacklin
- Ironic
- Jonna Pirinen – Pray
- Holy Cow – Universal Janis
- Vanha valokuva
- Pauli Hiltunen – Songs
- Pauli Hiltunen – Soittajapoika
- Sanna Rouvinen – Somewhere over the Rainbow (2009)
- Kaisa Makkonen project
- Caligor – Valkoisen huonen vanki (2014)
- Anu Pitko project (2016)
- Kiteenarium (2017) (producer)
- Emma ja Severi - Minun ystäväni (2018)
