= Sacrament of Wilderness =

1998 single by Nightwish

Single by Nightwish

from the album Oceanborn
- Released: November 1998
- Studio: Caverock (Kitee, Finland)
- Length: 4:09
- Label: Spinefarm
- Composers: Emppu Vuorinen; Tuomas Holopainen
- Lyricist: Tuomas Holopainen
- Producer: Tero Kinnunen

Nightwish singles chronology
"The Carpenter" (1997)	"Sacrament of Wilderness" (1998)	"Walking in the Air" (1999)

"Sacrament of Wilderness" is the second single by the Finnish symphonic metal band Nightwish, released as the first single from their second studio album, Oceanborn, and a split-single with "Eternal Tears of Sorrow" and "Darkwoods My Betrothed". The single's cover art features the owl with the same scroll as in the cover of Oceanborn and Wishmaster.

"Sacrament of Wilderness" reached number one on the Finnish Singles Chart for four weeks and was certified gold in Finland. Former Nightwish bassist Marko Hietala does not like this song as much as he likes some others. When asked why, he said:

I don't really have anything against it. I can say that there's certain mathematic predictability in the vocal melodies, and I find other songs more exciting because they don't have it. It's still a good addition to the liveset.

== Music video ==
The music video is a live performance of the song at Kitee, the band's hometown, on 13 November 1998. The band members, except Sami, sported short hair in the video, released as bonus material on Nightwish's first DVD, From Wishes to Eternity, in 2001.

== Track listing ==
No.	Title	Writer(s)	Length
1.	"Sacrament of Wilderness"	Tuomas Holopainen	4:11
2.	"Burning Flames' Embrace" (Eternal Tears of Sorrow)	Jarmo Puolakanaho	4:07
3.	"The Crow and the Warrior" (Darkwoods My Betrothed)	Hexenmeister, Hallgrim	4:20

== Personnel ==
- Tarja Turunen – lead vocals
- Tuomas Holopainen – keyboards
- Emppu Vuorinen – lead guitar
- Jukka Nevalainen – drums
- Sami Vänskä – bass

== Charts ==
Chart (1998–1999)	Peak position
Finland (Suomen virallinen lista)	1

== Certifications ==
Region	Certification	Certified units/sales
Finland (Musiikkituottajat)	Gold	7,616
