= Tapio Wilska =

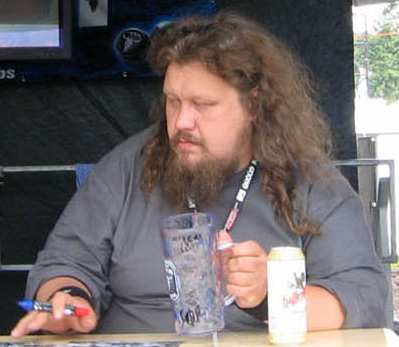
- Wilska during Meet & Greet at Wacken Open Air 2005.

Background information
- Also known as: Wilska
- Born: 19 September 1969 (age 55); Savonlinna, Finland
- Origin: Finland
- Genres: Folk metal, death metal, heavy metal, black metal, doom metal, gothic metal, symphonic metal, power metal, progressive metal, thrash metal
- Instrument(s): Vocals, bass, guitar, keyboards

Tapio Wilska (born 19 September 1969) is the main vocalist of the heavy metal band Sethian. He is also the ex-lead vocalist for the band Finntroll and is the current vocalist of Canadian band Obscene Eulogy. He gets his inspiration from bands like Black Sabbath, Motörhead, Dead Kennedys, Venom, Thin Lizzy and The Pixies.

== Biography ==
His musical career started when he was in bands like Lyijykomppania, Stray Toasters and Nattvindens Gråt with Sami Vänskä and Tuomas Holopainen (both from the then yet to be founded Nightwish) in the middle of the 1990s. He even helped Nightwish to get a record deal with Spinefarm. When Nightwish became an established name, Wilska moved on to stage technical work during their tours. His job included working on microphones, the bass and drums, and some security.

When Nightwish released their 1998 album Oceanborn, Wilska was asked to do the male vocals on the tracks "Devil and the Deep Dark Ocean" and "The Pharaoh Sails to Orion". After his appearance on Oceanborn, Wilska also performed on the song "10th Man Down" on Over the Hills and Far Away in 2001 and once again with "The Pharaoh Sails to Orion" on Nightwish's DVD From Wishes to Eternity.

After this, Wilska quit working as a roadie and started working on his own project, entitled Sethian. Once again, he got a lot of help from Nightwish, mainly Tuomas and Jukka, the latter of whom had even decided to play drums for the band. In 2003 the album Into The Silence was released.

During May 2002 Tapio was featured on the album track "Farewell" by Finnish-based doom metal band Rapture reciting lyrics for the song.

In late 2002, however, vocalist Jan "Katla" Jämsen left the band Finntroll because of a virus-based growth on his vocal cords. Wilska was asked to be the new singer, and he accepted. In 2004, he released his first full album with Finntroll called Nattfödd.

In early 2006 Wilska was fired from Finntroll due to personal differences. Very soon afterwards he joined Finnish pagan metal band Soulgrind as a bassist, and also started a new metal band Blood Royal. He has been also bassist for Survivors Zero, a Finnish death metal band since 2007.

== Discography ==
All of the albums Wilska appears on:

- Lyijykomppania – Uimakoulu (1993)
- Nattvindens Gråt – A Bard's Tale (1994)
- Nattvindens Gråt – Chaos Without Theory (1997)
- Wizzard – Devilmusick (1999)
- Wizzard – Songs of Sin and Damnation (2000)
- Nightwish – Oceanborn (1998)
- Nightwish – From Wishes to Eternity (2001)
- Nightwish – Over The Hills And Far Away (2001)
- Sethian – Into the Silence (2003)
- Finntroll – Visor om slutet (2003)
- Finntroll – Nattfödd (2004)
- Kylähullut – Lisää persettä rättipäille (2007)
- Soulgrind – Pakana (2007)
- Survivors Zero – CMXCIX (2007)
