= Deep Silent Complete =

2000 single by Nightwish

Single by Nightwish

from the album Wishmaster
- B-side: "Sleepwalker" (heavy version)
- Released: 16 July 2000
- Genre: Power metal
- Length: 3:57
- Label: Spinefarm
- Songwriter: Tuomas Holopainen
- Producers: Nightwish; Tero Kinnunen

Nightwish singles chronology
"Sleeping Sun" (1999)	"Deep Silent Complete" (2000)	"Ever Dream" (2002)

"Deep Silent Complete" is the fifth single by the Finnish symphonic metal band Nightwish, released as the only official single from their third studio album, Wishmaster. The song is a "tribute to the mighty power of the ocean" and contains some lines written by William Shakespeare.

It reached number three on the Finland singles chart, and was certified with Gold Disc in Finland with more than 5,000 sold copies.

== Track listing ==
All tracks are written by Tuomas Holopainen.

1. "Deep Silent Complete" – 3:57
2. "Sleepwalker" (heavy version) – 3:10

== Personnel ==
- Tarja Turunen – vocals
- Tuomas Holopainen – keyboards
- Emppu Vuorinen – guitars
- Jukka Nevalainen – drums
- Sami Vänskä – bass guitar
