= Sleeping Sun =

1999 Nightwish song

Single by Nightwish
- Released: 2 August 1999
- Recorded: August–October 1998
- Studio: Caverock, Kitee, Finland; Finnvox, Helsinki, Finland
- Genre: Symphonic metal; power ballad
- Length: 4:01
- Label: Drakkar
- Songwriter: Tuomas Holopainen
- Producer: Nightwish

Nightwish singles chronology
"Walking in the Air" (1999)	"Sleeping Sun" (1999)	"Deep Silent Complete" (2000)

"Sleeping Sun" is a power ballad and the fourth single by the Finnish symphonic metal band Nightwish. It was released as a maxi single with three other songs on 2 August 1999 to coincide with the total solar eclipse that would occur on 11 August.

Later that same year, the band's 1998 album Oceanborn was reissued with the song added to the track listing, and it has been on every edition of the album since. In 2004, it was included on Nightwish's first compilation album Tales from the Elvenpath, and in 2005, a re-recorded version was released to promote Highest Hopes: The Best of Nightwish, another compilation released on 27 September that same year.

"Sleeping Sun" was certified as a Gold Disc in Finland with more than 5.000 copies sold, and also in Germany with more than 15.000 copies. It reached the number-two spot in the Finnish charts, and was #69 in the German Official Singles Charts.

== Track listing ==
Sleeping Sun (4 Ballads of the Eclipse) track listing
No.	Title	Lyrics	Music	Length
1.	"Sleeping Sun"	Tuomas Holopainen	Holopainen	4:01
2.	"Walking in the Air" (Howard Blake cover)	Blake	Blake	5:28
3.	"Swanheart"	Holopainen	Holopainen	4:44
4.	"Angels Fall First"	Holopainen	Nightwish	5:34
Total length:				19:47

== Music video ==
A music video was shot for the song, in which lead vocalist Tarja Turunen seems to have red hair. The videoclip includes many landscapes characteristic of Finland, for example the forests, the beaches and a large grain field. The video was directed by Sami Käyhkö and shot at Ivalo and Lake Inari, Finland, in July 1999.

When the song was re-recorded in 2005, another video was made, showing Turunen as a valkyrie walking along a battlefield filled with dead and wounded soldiers, played by the other band members, as they are being led away.

=== Crew ===
- Director: Sami Käyhkö
- Producer: Paula Eronen
- Executive producer: Sami Manninen
- Cinematographer: Risto Laasonen
- Camera assistant: Kalle Pekkala
- Trip and organizer: Juha Virtala
- Makeup and costumes: Johanna Pulli
- Grip assistant: Esko Virtala, Ville Kyro
- Offline editors: Sami Käyhkö, Reko Turja
- Telecine colourist: Adam Vidovic
- Online and compositing: Sami Käyhkö, Reko Turja

== Personnel ==
- Tarja Turunen – vocals
- Tuomas Holopainen – keyboards
- Emppu Vuorinen – guitars
- Jukka Nevalainen – drums
- Sami Vänskä – bass guitar

== Covers ==
German dramatic dark rock band ApoVelation released a demo version in 2006. Spanish Gothic metal band Iris covered the song in 2007. Maryana Borak sang the song live in Novy Rozdil, Ukraine in 2007. Soprano Maria Lund recorded a Finnish-language version of the song (titled "Uinuva Aurinko") for her 2008 album Ajan Sävel. Classical string quartet group The Random Quartet also played the song in 2008. Brazilian rock band Swianne currently perform the song regularly in their concerts. New Mexico-based acoustic duo Chile Pi included it on their album Out in New Mexico in 2017.

== 2005 re-recorded version ==
"Sleeping Sun"

Single by Nightwish

from the album Highest Hopes: The Best of Nightwish
- Released: 19 October 2005
- Genre: Symphonic metal
- Length: 4:06 (radio edit); 4:27 (full version)
- Label: Spinefarm
- Songwriter: Tuomas Holopainen
- Producer: Tero Kinnunen

Nightwish singles chronology
"The Siren" (2005)	"Sleeping Sun" (2005)	"Amaranth" (2007)

In 2005, Nightwish announced that they were busy recording a new version of "Sleeping Sun" for a compilation album titled Highest Hopes: The Best of Nightwish. Tarja Turunen sang lead vocals on the re-recorded version, this becoming her final studio contribution to the band before being replaced by Anette Olzon. To promote the compilation, it was released as both a CD and a DVD single.

The CD single included the full 2005 version, the radio edit of this new version, and the original 1999 version.

The DVD single included two music videos, one for each version of the song.

=== Track listing ===
==== CD single ====
1. "Sleeping Sun" (2005 radio edit) – 4:06
2. "Sleeping Sun" (2005 full version) – 4:27
3. "Sleeping Sun" (original version) – 4:03

==== DVD single ====
1. "Sleeping Sun" (2005 version, music video) – 4:11
2. "Sleeping Sun" (2000 version, music video) – 4:05
3. "Sleeping Sun" (live at Summer Breeze Open Air, 2002) – 4:40

=== Personnel ===
- Tarja Turunen – vocals
- Tuomas Holopainen – keyboards
- Emppu Vuorinen – guitars
- Marko Hietala – bass guitar
- Jukka Nevalainen – drums
