= Over the Hills and Far Away (EP) =

EP by Nightwish
- Released: 25 June 2001
- Recorded: February–March 2001
- Studio: Caverock (Kitee); Finnvox (Helsinki)
- Length: 20:13
- Label: Spinefarm
- Producer: Nightwish; Tero Kinnunen

Professional ratings
Review scores
Source	Rating
AllMusic	3/5 stars
PopMatters	7/10 stars

Over the Hills and Far Away is the first EP by the Finnish symphonic metal band Nightwish, released on 25 June 2001 through Spinefarm Records in Finland, and Drakkar Records in the rest of Europe. It was also released by Toy's Factory in Japan and Century Media Records in the US. It is the final release to feature bassist Sami Vänskä who left the band after its recording, due to musical differences between him and Tuomas Holopainen. He was replaced by the bassist and male vocalist, Marko Hietala.

The editions by Drakkar and Century Media contain different live tracks taken from the live DVD From Wishes to Eternity, recorded in Tampere, Finland, on 29 December 2000.

The EP debuted at number one on the Finnish Singles Chart and spent twelve weeks in the top three, topping it for another four weeks and spending six weeks at number two. It charted for a total of 49 weeks, including two weeks in early 2004. The EP has been awarded double-platinum certification in Finland and has sold over 36,000 copies to date, becoming the sixth-best-selling single of all time in Finland. Over the Hills and Far Away entered also the European charts, in the Top 100 of Germany, Austria, France and Switzerland.

The title track is a cover of a song by Northern Irish singer and guitarist Gary Moore, from his album Wild Frontier, and has backing vocals by Tuomas Holopainen and Kakko. "It had a bit of a karaoke vibe because the backing track was so similar," Moore observed. "I don't mean that insultingly, but it was almost identical. I believe they're a pretty big band now, so it's cool that they did it." The rest of the EP consists of two new songs and a remake of Angels Fall First's "Astral Romance", sung by Tony Kakko beside Tarja Turunen. Tapio Wilska sings on "10th Man Down".

== Track listing ==
All tracks are written by Tuomas Holopainen, except "Over the Hills and Far Away" written by Gary Moore.

Over the Hills and Far Away track listing
No.	Title	Length
1.	"Over the Hills and Far Away" (Gary Moore cover)	5:03
2.	"10th Man Down"	5:20
3.	"Away"	4:32
4.	"Astral Romance" (remake 2001)	5:18
Total length:		20:13

== Personnel ==
Credits for Over the Hills and Far Away adapted from liner notes.

Nightwish

- Tarja Turunen – vocals
- Tuomas Holopainen – keyboards, backing vocals on "Over the Hills and Far Away", mixing
- Emppu Vuorinen – guitars
- Sami Vänskä – bass guitar, cover photo
- Jukka Nevalainen – drums

Additional musicians

- Tapio Wilska – vocals on "10th Man Down"
- Tony Kakko – vocals on "Astral Romance", backing vocals on "Over the Hills and Far Away"

Production

- Tero Kinnunen – producer, mixing, recording
- Mikko Karmila – recording, mixing
- Mika Jussila – mastering

== Charts ==
Year	Chart	Position
2001	Finnish Singles Chart	1
2001	Austrian Top 40 Albums	54
2001	Swiss Albums Top 100	79
2001	German Albums Chart	85
2001	French Albums Chart	139

== Certifications ==
Country	Organization	Year	Sales
Finland	IFPI	2006	2× Platinum (+ 30,000)

== See also ==
- List of best-selling singles in Finland
