= Century Child =

Studio album by Nightwish
- Released: 25 May 2002
- Recorded: January–April 2002
- Studios: Caverock (Kitee); Finnvox (Helsinki)
- Genres: Symphonic metal; power metal
- Length: 50:09
- Label: Spinefarm
- Producers: Tuomas Holopainen; TeeCee Kinnunen

Nightwish studio album chronology
Wishmaster (2000)	Century Child (2002)	Once (2004)

Singles from Century Child
- 1. "Ever Dream" Released: 3 May 2002; 2. "Bless the Child" Released: 21 July 2002

Professional ratings
Review scores
Source	Rating
AllMusic	4.5/5 stars
Sea of Tranquility	4.5/5 stars 4/5 stars
Metal.de	9/10 stars
Metal Hammer	6/7 stars
Metal Crypt	5/5 stars

Century Child is the fourth studio album by the Finnish symphonic metal band Nightwish. It was released in 2002 through Spinefarm Records in Finland, Drakkar Entertainment in the rest of Europe, Century Media Records in the US, and Toy's Factory in Japan. It is the first album which features former bassist and male vocalist Marko Hietala. It is also the first Nightwish album to feature an orchestra.

Spinefarm Records released a 2-CD special edition of the album in 2002. It includes liner art with the band members' signatures, and a Video CD containing the music video for their cover of Gary Moore's "Over the Hills and Far Away". In addition, the booklet contains an ID code that allows the owner to download the entire album and three extra tracks from the Internet for a limited time. The bonus tracks are "Nightwish", "The Forever Moments" and "Etiäinen", all from the band's first demo of 1996.

The album was certified double platinum in Finland with more than 60,000 sold copies, the second best selling album of 2002 in Finland. Century Child has sold more than 80,000 copies in Finland alone.

== Musical style ==
Century Child is the beginning of a shift in sound for the band, with a smaller emphasis on power metal previously seen in Wishmaster and Oceanborn, and instead focuses on deeper lyrics and more of a film soundtrack sound, with Century Child having a more gothic and symphonic sound. The album is the first of the band's discography to be recorded with a live symphony orchestra and chorus, as well as being the first to include a permanent male vocalist with the addition of Marko Hietala, incorporating a "beauty and the beast" dynamic into the band.

In an interview with Perkele Magazine in 2002, songwriter and keyboardist Tuomas Holopainen discussed the central theme of the album, which he stated was "childhood" and the "loss of innocence". When asked more about the theme, he stated:

Century Child is not a concept album, and it was never considered to be, but when I had written half the lyrics I realized that all the lyrics touched me on the same theme: the one about innocence, childhood and the loss of that innocence. This all started about half a year ago because, in particular, this was the most boring and difficult period of my life and it was reflected in the music. I just wanted to write it all down the way it is written. I've never been more willing in my life to use the word "fuck/shit" in songs! Anyway, this is not the time. But, we have some pretty heavy, depressing and even hopeful lyrics. The album's name, Century Child, describes the loss of childhood and innocence. Take, for example, "Bless the Child", where it all begins. Then we have "End of All Hope" that shows the feeling I have at the exact moment in my life. "Dead to the World": The world has nothing more to offer. All themes are very personal, coming from my own head. Nightwish has been a way for me to write a diary about my life. Wishmaster was a more positive record. This time I was more bored and you will hear it on the CD. The next album could be more positive again, if things get better.

— Tuomas Holopainen, Perkele Magazine

== Track listing ==
All lyrics are written by Tuomas Holopainen, except where noted; all music is composed by Holopainen, except where noted.

Century Child track listing
No.	Title	Lyrics	Music	Length
1.	"Bless the Child"			6:12
2.	"End of All Hope"			3:54
3.	"Dead to the World"			4:19
4.	"Ever Dream"			4:43
5.	"Slaying the Dreamer"		Holopainen; Emppu Vuorinen	4:31
6.	"Forever Yours"			3:51
7.	"Ocean Soul"			4:14
8.	"Feel for You"			3:54
9.	"The Phantom of the Opera" (Andrew Lloyd Webber cover)	Charles Hart; Richard Stilgoe; Mike Batt	Lloyd Webber	4:09
10.	"Beauty of the Beast": I. "Long Lost Love"; II. "One More Night to Live"; III. "Christabel"		Marko Hietala (I); Holopainen (II, III); Vuorinen (II)	10:22
Total length:				50:09

Japanese edition bonus track
No.	Title	Length
11.	"The Wayfarer"	3:25
Total length:		53:34

2007 reissue bonus tracks
No.	Title	Lead vocals	Length
11.	"Lagoon"		3:46
12.	"The Wayfarer"		3:24
13.	"Bless the Child" (edit)		4:05
14.	"End of All Hope" (live at Summer Breeze Open Air)		4:17
15.	"Dead to the World" (live at Summer Breeze Open Air)	Turunen with Hietala	4:45
Total length:			70:26

Special edition bonus VCD
No.	Title	Writer(s)	Length
1.	"Over the Hills and Far Away" (Gary Moore cover; music video)	Moore	3:51

Special edition digital hidden tracks
No.	Title	Length
11.	"Nightwish" (demo)	5:49
12.	"The Forever Moments" (demo)	5:36
13.	"Etiäinen" (demo)	2:59
Total length:		64:33

== Personnel ==
Credits for Century Child adapted from liner notes.

Nightwish

- Tarja Turunen – lead vocals
- Tuomas Holopainen – keyboards
- Emppu Vuorinen – guitars
- Marko Hietala – bass, male vocals on tracks 3, 4, 5, 8, 9 & 10
- Jukka Nevalainen – drums, percussion

Additional musicians

- Joensuu City Orchestra – orchestra
- Juha Ikonen – orchestra leader
- Riku Niemi – orchestra and choir conductor, orchestra and choir arrangements, orchestra and choir production
- Mongo Aaltonen – orchestral percussion
- St. Thomas Chorus of Helsinki – choir vocals
- Hilkka Kangasniemi – choirmaster
- Sam Hardwick – spoken words on "Bless the Child" and "Beauty of the Beast"
- Kristiina Ilmonen – tin whistle
- GME choir – additional noise

Production

- Tero "TeeCee" Kinnunen – production
- Mikko Karmila – mixing
- Mika Jussila – mastering
- Veijo Laine – orchestra and choir arrangements, orchestra and choir production
- Terhi Kallio – orchestra engineering
- Tuomas Holopainen – art direction
- Markus Mayer – cover art
- Spelltone – layout
- Hilkka Kangasniemi – choirmaster

== Charts ==
=== Weekly charts ===
Chart (2002)	Peak position
Austrian Albums (Ö3 Austria)	15
Dutch Albums (Album Top 100)	41
Finnish Albums (Suomen virallinen lista)	1
French Albums (SNEP)	32
German Albums (Offizielle Top 100)	5
Norwegian Albums (VG-lista)	19
Swedish Albums (Sverigetopplistan)	39
Swiss Albums (Schweizer Hitparade)	50

=== Year-end charts ===
Chart (2002)	Position
German Albums (Offizielle Top 100)	97

== Certifications ==
Region	Certification	Certified units/sales
Finland (Musiikkituottajat)	2× Platinum	86,072
Germany (BVMI)	Gold	150,000^{‡}
^{‡} Sales+streaming figures based on certification alone.
