= Angels Fall First =

Studio album by Nightwish
- Released: 1 November 1997 (Note: Standard edition release date. Limited edition released on 30 September 1997.)
- Recorded: April–September 1997
- Studio: Huvikeskus (Kitee)
- Genres: Symphonic metal; power metal; folk metal
- Length: 51:29
- Languages: English; Finnish
- Label: Spinefarm
- Producers: Tuomas Holopainen; Nightwish

Nightwish studio album chronology
Angels Fall First (1997)	Oceanborn (1998)

Singles from Angels Fall First
- 1. "The Carpenter" Released: 29 September 1997

Professional ratings
Review scores
Source	Rating
AllMusic	3/5 stars
Collector's Guide to Heavy Metal	7/10
Metal Hammer (GER)	4/7 stars

Angels Fall First is the debut studio album by the Finnish symphonic metal band Nightwish, originally released by Spinefarm Records on 30 September 1997 as a 500-copy limited edition. This edition is highly sought after by collectors and in 2012 a copy was sold for $1137.23 on eBay. It was subsequently released to the general public on 1 November, with four additional songs. The album was released in the US by Century Media in March 2001.

Angels Fall First is a power metal album with gothic, folk and classical elements.

== Background ==
Tuomas Holopainen wrote the music for the album during his time in the Finnish Army. In a 2008 interview with the British magazine Kerrang!, Tuomas Holopainen remembered:

It came about in August 1996, around a campfire. We were at my summer cabin, a bunch of friends camping out, barbecuing, singing songs, and then it just hit me that I wanted to start a band. But we were too far ambitious at that time for it to remain simply acoustic and making music with just acoustic guitar, keyboards and female voice, was just a bit boring, and we naturally started heading in a heavier direction. The funny thing about Angels Fall First is that it was only supposed to be a demo to send out to record labels. But then Spinefarm heard it and thought it was perfect, so they put it out as it was with no remixing or anything. I used to be a bit embarrassed but now I can feel proud and nostalgic about those songs.

The original pressing featured Holopainen's home contact address, an accident from reprinting the demo sleeve for the album.

As of December 2009, Angels Fall First has sold more than 36,000 copies in Finland alone.

The band, and especially band leader and keyboardist Tuomas Holopainen has since frowned upon the album, considering it essentially an extended demo. In a 2011 interview, when asked what album other than Imaginaerum Holopainen wanted to make into a movie, he replied that it would be Angels Fall First, and that it would be "a black-and-white comedy".

The male vocals heard on "Beauty and the Beast", "The Carpenter", "Astral Romance" and "Once Upon a Troubadour" are sung by keyboardist–band leader Tuomas Holopainen, as well as the whispers in the beginning of the demo version of "Etiäinen". Following this release, Holopainen never sang credited on an album again, because he thought that he was not good enough.

== Track listing ==
All lyrics are written by Tuomas Holopainen; all music is composed by Nightwish.

Angels Fall First track listing
No.	Title	Length
1.	"Elvenpath"	4:38
2.	"Beauty and the Beast"	6:22
3.	"The Carpenter"	5:56
4.	"Astral Romance"	5:11
5.	"Angels Fall First"	5:34
6.	"Tutankhamen"	5:30
7.	"Nymphomaniac Fantasia"	4:45
8.	"Know Why the Nightingale Sings"	4:13
9.	"Lappi (Lapland): I. Erämaajärvi"	2:15
10.	"Lappi (Lapland): II. Witchdrums"	1:19
11.	"Lappi (Lapland): III. This Moment Is Eternity"	3:12
12.	"Lappi (Lapland): IV. Etiäinen"	2:34
Total length:		51:29

2007 reissue bonus tracks
No.	Title	Length
13.	"A Return to the Sea"	5:46
14.	"Nightwish" (demo)	5:49
15.	"The Forever Moments" (demo)	5:36
16.	"Etiäinen" (demo)	2:59
Total length:		71:39

== Personnel ==
All information from the album booklet.

Nightwish

- Tarja Turunen – vocals
- Tuomas Holopainen – keyboards, male vocals (on track 2, 3, 4 & "Once Upon a Troubadour"), arrangements
- Emppu Vuorinen – guitars
- Jukka Nevalainen – drums, percussion

Additional musician

- Esa Lehtinen – flute

Production

- Tero Kinnunen – engineering, mixing, recording
- Mika Jussila – mastering
- Garry Black – cover photo
- Toni Härkönen – photography

== Charts ==
Chart (1998)	Peak position
Finnish Albums (Suomen virallinen lista)	31

Chart (2022)	Peak position
Finnish Albums (Suomen virallinen lista)	5

== Certifications ==
Region	Certification	Certified units/sales
Finland (Musiikkituottajat)	Gold	36,526
