= Oceanborn =

Studio album by Nightwish
- Released: 7 December 1998
- Recorded: August–October 1998
- Studio: Caverock (Kitee); Finnvox (Helsinki)
- Genre: Symphonic metal; power metal
- Length: 49:02
- Label: Spinefarm
- Producer: Nightwish

Nightwish studio album chronology
Angels Fall First (1997)	Oceanborn (1998)	Wishmaster (2000)

Alternative cover
- European edition

Singles from Oceanborn
- 1. "Sacrament of Wilderness" Released: 25 November 1998; 2. "Walking in the Air" Released: 31 January 1999

Professional ratings
Review scores
Source	Rating
AllMusic	4/5 stars
Chronicles of Chaos	10/10 stars
Collector's Guide to Heavy Metal	8/10 stars
Metal Storm	10/10 stars
Metal Crypt	4.5/5 stars

Oceanborn is the second studio album by the Finnish symphonic metal band Nightwish. It was released in Finland by Spinefarm Records on 7 December 1998 and in the spring of 1999 worldwide. It was released by Drakkar Entertainment in the rest of Europe, and by Toy's Factory in Japan. It is their first album with bassist Sami Vänskä.

Oceanborn has sold more than 68,000 copies in Finland. The single "Sleeping Sun" was released in August 1999, and the song has been included in every reissue of the album since then. The album was released in the US by Century Media in March 2001.

In 2017, Loudwire ranked it as the 10th best power metal album of all time.

== Background ==
Speaking to Kerrang! in 2008, band founder Tuomas Holopainen reminisced that the band got really ambitious after the debut album "that was never meant to be released as a proper record. It happened almost by accident, so we decided to put everything into making Oceanborn great." He added:

We were all such amateurs when it came to recording. We didn't really know what we were doing, so we were just experimenting with a lot of different things, we even brought in this string trio who were complete shit, then another violin, then another violin on top. So we ended up with 'Moondance' having 20 tracks of violin, just because we hadn't done this before and didn't know what we were doing! It's a pretty stuffed album, but I also think it's one of our best because you can hear the excitement of trying all these new things. It seems strange that this became a breakthrough album, because back at the time the music was so funny. It was really operatic, and when you look at the pictures, they look pretty horrific.

According to Kerrang!, "for all its Royal Albert Hall grandiosity, Oceanborn was actually recorded in a Finnish school."

== Musical style ==
This album marked a definitive change in musical scope for Nightwish from their folk-laden roots in Angels Fall First, showcasing a more bombastic, power metal-oriented sound with faster tempos, harmonic guitar/keyboard leads, and plenty of double-bass-heavy drumwork. During that time, Stratovarius was Holopainen's biggest inspiration, hence the power metal sound of the album. Oceanborn's sound hearkens a more dramatic approach in the overall musical scope, mostly relegated to the symphonic keyboard work and lead singer Tarja Turunen's vocals. According to Mape Ollila, who penned the band's biography:

Along with Therion's Theli, the album came to be known as one of the cornerstones of the emerging genre of symphonic metal.

Most of the lyrics are fantasy-themed, with tracks like "Swanheart" and "Walking in the Air", a cover from the animated TV special The Snowman, as typical examples. In addition, there are also some theatrical tracks like "Devil & the Deep Dark Ocean". Oceanborn is among their darkest albums, making use of the harsh vocals of Tapio Wilska in the songs "The Pharaoh Sails to Orion" and "Devil & the Deep Dark Ocean".

== Track listing ==
All lyrics are written by Tuomas Holopainen, except where noted; all music is composed by Holopainen, except where noted.

Oceanborn track listing
No.	Title	Lyrics	Music	Length
1.	"Stargazers"			4:27
2.	"Gethsemane"			5:21
3.	"Devil & the Deep Dark Ocean"			4:46
4.	"Sacrament of Wilderness"		Emppu Vuorinen; Holopainen	4:12
5.	"Passion and the Opera"			4:50
6.	"Swanheart"			4:44
7.	"Moondance" (instrumental)			3:31
8.	"The Riddler"			5:16
9.	"The Pharaoh Sails to Orion"			6:27
10.	"Walking in the Air" (Howard Blake cover)	Blake	Blake	5:28
Total length:				49:02

1999 reissue added track
No.	Title	Length
11.	"Sleeping Sun"	4:01
Total length:		53:03

Japanese edition bonus track
No.	Title	Length
11.	"Nightquest"	4:17
Total length:		53:19

Limited European Tour Edition bonus tracks
No.	Title	Length
11.	"Nightquest"	4:15
12.	"A Return to the Sea"	5:46
13.	"Sleeping Sun"	4:01
Total length:		63:04

2007 reissue bonus tracks
No.	Title	Length
12.	"Nightquest"	4:15
13.	"Sleeping Sun" (live at Summer Breeze Open Air)	4:31
14.	"Swanheart" (live at Pakkahuone)	3:55
15.	"The Pharaoh Sails to Orion" (live at Pakkahuone)	6:39
Total length:		72:23

== Personnel ==
Credits for Oceanborn adapted from liner notes.

Nightwish

- Tarja Turunen – lead vocals
- Tuomas Holopainen – keyboards, backing vocals on "Moondance", songwriting, lyrics
- Emppu Vuorinen – guitars, songwriting
- Sami Vänskä – bass
- Jukka Nevalainen – drums, percussion, backing vocals on "Moondance"

Production

- Tero Kinnunen – engineering, producer
- Mikko Karmila – engineering, mixing
- Mika Jussila – mastering
- Toni Härkönen – photography
- Maria Sandell – artwork
- Markus Mayer – re-release cover art

Additional musicians

- Tapio Wilska – additional vocals on "Devil & The Deep Dark Ocean" and "The Pharaoh Sails To Orion", backing vocals on "Moondance"
- Esa Lehtinen – flute
- Plamen Dimov – violin
- Kaisli Kaivola – violin
- Markku Palola – viola
- Erkki Hirvikangas – cello

== Charts ==
Chart (1999)	Peak position
Finnish Albums (Suomen virallinen lista)	5
German Albums (Offizielle Top 100)	74

Chart (2022)	Peak position
Finnish Albums (Suomen virallinen lista)	2

== Certifications ==
Region	Certification	Certified units/sales
Finland (Musiikkituottajat)	Platinum	68,971

== Accolades ==
=== Listicles ===
Year	Publisher	List	Rank	Ref.
2017	Loudwire	Top 25 Power Metal Albums of All Time	10	
