= Wishmaster (album) =

Studio album by Nightwish
- Released: 8 May 2000
- Recorded: January–March 2000
- Studio: Caverock (Kitee); Finnvox (Helsinki)
- Genre: Symphonic metal; power metal
- Length: 53:30
- Label: Spinefarm
- Producer: Nightwish; Tero Kinnunen

Nightwish studio album chronology
Oceanborn (1998)	Wishmaster (2000)	Century Child (2002)

Singles from Wishmaster
- 1. "Deep Silent Complete" Released: 16 July 2000

Professional ratings
Review scores
Source	Rating
AllMusic	2.5/5 stars
Brave Words & Bloody Knuckles	8.5/10 stars
Chronicles of Chaos	8/10 stars
Metal Hammer (GER)	6/7 stars
Kerrang!	4/5 stars

Wishmaster is the third studio album by the Finnish symphonic metal band Nightwish. It was released on 8 May 2000 through Spinefarm Records in Finland. The album was released in the rest of Europe by Drakkar Entertainment on 29 May, and in Japan by Toy's Factory on 19 July. In the US, it was released by Century Media on 6 February 2001.

Wishmaster peaked at No. 1 in the official Finnish charts; the album also debuted in the European charts at No. 21 in Germany and No. 66 in France. Wishmaster has sold more than 79,447 copies in Finland alone, and as of January 2023, more than 150,000 copies have been sold in Germany alone, certifying the album Gold. In 2019, Metal Hammer ranked it as the 18th best power metal album of all time.

Most reissues of the album contain the song "Sleepwalker", which was released in July 2000 to compete in the Finnish national final for the Eurovision Song Contest 2000.

== Background and release ==
The writing and recording of Wishmaster was very fast and devoid of complications, in contrast with what had happened for Oceanborn. The main composer Tuomas Holopainen considers the album "the most distant and least personal (...) in the Nightwish catalogue", despite containing the "mother of all Nightwish songs - Dead Boys' Poem." The image of the dead boy would reappear in several songs of the following albums. Wishmaster was issued on 8 May 2000, a few days earlier than its scheduled release, because the music had leaked onto the Internet.

== Musical style ==
Wishmaster's sound continues the bombastic symphonic power metal approach originally featured on Oceanborn, albeit with more emphasis on atmosphere and melody versus speed and heaviness. Perhaps even more so than its predecessor, Wishmaster has a very clear fantasy theme. While commonly considered to be closer to conventional power metal, there is still a great variety with slower songs like "Two for Tragedy" and "Dead Boy's Poem", and more epic pieces like "FantasMic". "The Kinslayer" is written about the victims of the Columbine High School massacre. "Wishmaster" was inspired by the fantasy novel series The Lord of the Rings and Dragonlance, mentioning Elbereth, Lórien, and the Grey Havens from the former; and Dalamar, Raistlin Majere (Dalamar's shalafi, or "master"), Gilthanas, the Sla-Mori, Silvara and the Inn of the Last Home from the latter. "FantasMic" is a song about the Disney animated movies, particularly their fantasy and fable elements, taking its title from the Disneyland show Fantasmic!.

== Track listing ==
All lyrics are written by Tuomas Holopainen; all music is composed by Holopainen, except where noted.

Wishmaster track listing
No.	Title	Music	Length
1.	"She Is My Sin"		4:46
2.	"The Kinslayer"		3:59
3.	"Come Cover Me"	Holopainen; Emppu Vuorinen	4:34
4.	"Wanderlust"		4:50
5.	"Two for Tragedy"		3:51
6.	"Wishmaster"		4:23
7.	"Bare Grace Misery"	Holopainen; Vuorinen	3:39
8.	"Crownless"	Holopainen; Vuorinen	4:26
9.	"Deep Silent Complete"		3:57
10.	"Dead Boy's Poem"		6:47
11.	"FantasMic"		8:18
Total length:			53:30

Japanese bonus track
No.	Title	Length
12.	"Sleepwalker" (heavy mix)	3:10
Total length:		56:40

2007 reissue bonus tracks
No.	Title	Length
12.	"Sleepwalker" (original version)	2:57
13.	"Wanderlust" (live at Pakkahuone)	4:34
14.	"Deep Silent Complete" (live at Pakkahuone)	4:24
Total length:		65:25

== Personnel ==
Credits for Wishmaster adapted from liner notes.

Nightwish

- Tarja Turunen – vocals
- Tuomas Holopainen – keyboards, lyrics, songwriting
- Emppu Vuorinen – guitars, songwriting
- Sami Vänskä – bass
- Jukka Nevalainen – drums, percussion

Additional musicians

- Ike Vil – spoken words in "The Kinslayer"
- Sam Hardwick – spoken words in "Dead Boy's Poem"
- Esa Lehtinen – flute
- Matias Kaila – tenor vocals
- Kimmo Kallio – baritone vocals
- Riku Salminen – bass vocals
- Anssi Honkanen – bass vocals
- Ville Laaksonen – tenor vocals, choir arrangements

Production

- Tero Kinnunen – producer, engineering, recording
- Mikko Karmila – engineer, mixing, recording
- Mika Jussila – mastering
- Toni Härkönen – photography
- Maria Sandell – artwork
- Peter Dell – artwork, layout
- Markus Mayer – cover art

== Charts ==
Chart (2000)	Peak position
Finnish Albums (Suomen virallinen lista)	1
French Albums (SNEP)	66
German Albums (Offizielle Top 100)	21

== Certifications ==
Region	Certification	Certified units/sales
Finland (Musiikkituottajat)	Platinum	79,447
Germany (BVMI)	Gold	150,000^{‡}
^{‡} Sales+streaming figures based on certification alone.
