= Jukka Nevalainen =

Finnish musical artist (born 1978)

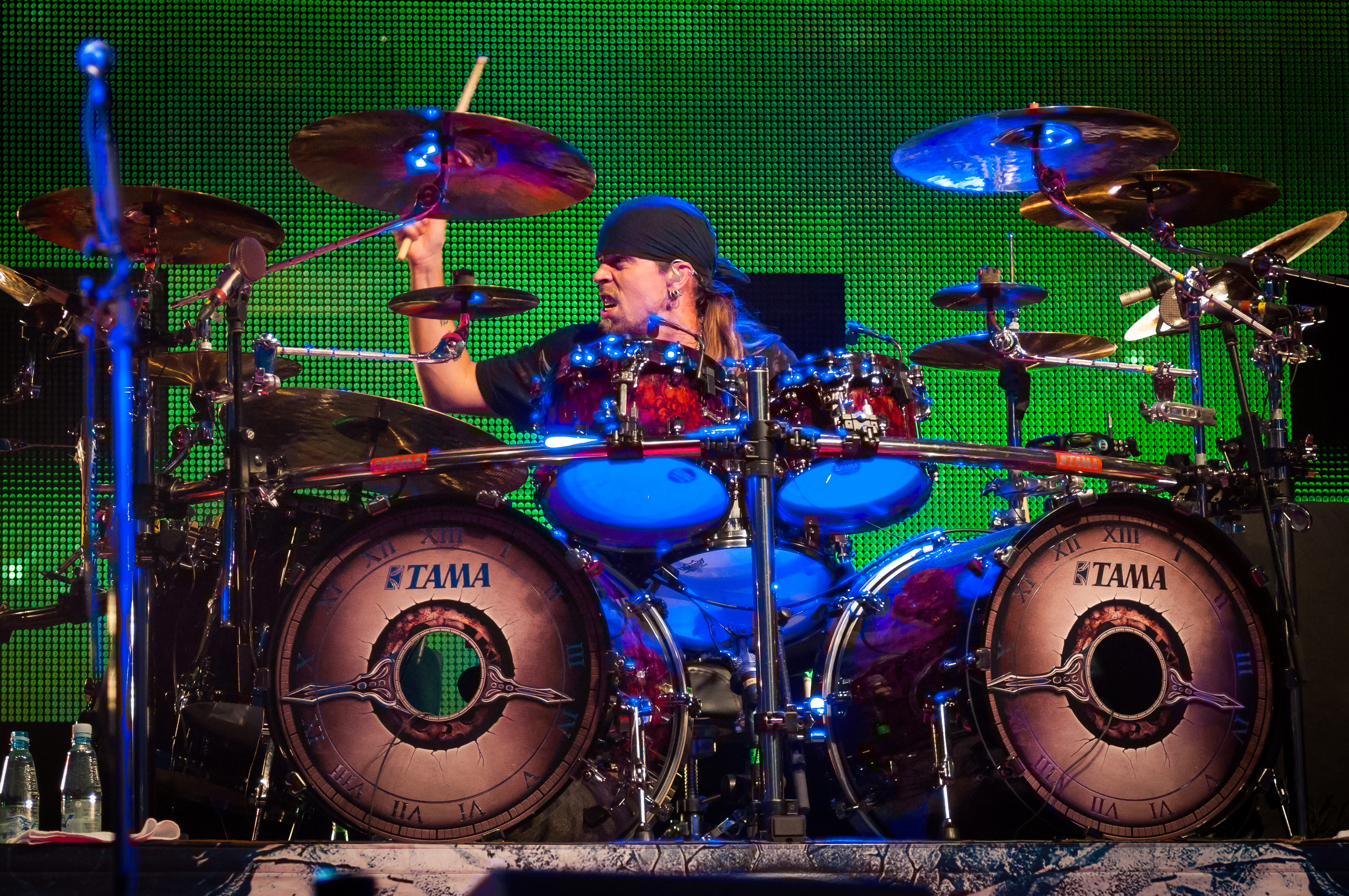

Background information
- Born: Jukka Antero Nevalainen; 21 April 1978 (age 48)
- Origin: Kitee, Finland
- Genres: Symphonic metal, power metal
- Occupations: Drummer, musician
- Instruments: Drums, percussion, keyboards
- Years active: 1993–2019
- Formerly of: Nightwish; Sethian

Jukka Antero "Julius" Nevalainen (born 21 April 1978) is the former drummer of the Finnish symphonic metal band Nightwish.

== Personal life ==
Nevalainen was born in Kitee, Finland and spent his early years in the city. His music teacher at school told him that a new educational program for music was opening, and he thought Nevalainen would fit in well as a drummer. He lacked a suitable place to practice so he made do at his home. His first band was "The Highway" but he joined his first real band at the age of 15–16. The band had a rehearsal place, but was restricted to practice only a couple of days a week. After he left that band, he joined up with Emppu Vuorinen and they got a permanent practice place. Nevalainen and Vuorinen played together in bands Ambrosia and Nidhro't before Nightwish.

Nevalainen lives with his wife Satu, daughter Luna (born in 2003) and son Niki (born on 19 December 2005) in Joensuu, Finland. His second daughter, Lara, was born on 22 June 2010. He is a vegetarian.

In 2026, Nevalainen opened Finland's first Wildcat Tattoo and Piercing shop in Joensuu.

== Career ==
After the early years of the band, Nevalainen got a new professional drum kit. He used that kit from the album Wishmaster to the end of the Once world tour in 2005. He was endorsed by Tama drums, Paiste cymbals and Pro-Mark sticks. He was in a side-project, Sethian, which is now completely dormant because of band members being busy with other bands.

On 6 August 2014, it was announced that Nevalainen would not be able to take part of Nightwish's eighth album and its subsequent tour due to insomnia, thus making the album Endless Forms Most Beautiful the first Nightwish recording without his participation. Nevalainen still handled the day-to-day affairs of the band, though. Kai Hahto (Wintersun) took his place in the album and on the subsequent tour. He returned to perform one song during their unofficial 20th-anniversary concert in August 2016 at Himos Park in Jämsä, Finland.

In July 2019, Nevalainen released a statement that he was not going to return to Nightwish and that he would continue working with the band behind the scenes, and that Hahto would become the band's new permanent drummer.

== Discography ==
=== Nightwish ===
Studio albums:

- Angels Fall First (1997)
- Oceanborn (1998)
- Wishmaster (2000)
- Century Child (2002)
- Once (2004)
- Dark Passion Play (2007)
- Imaginaerum (2011)

Live albums and EPs:

- From Wishes to Eternity (2000)
- Over the Hills and Far Away (2001)
- End of Innocence (2003)
- End of an Era (2006)
- Made in Hong Kong (And in Various Other Places) (2009)
- Showtime, Storytime (2013)

=== Sethian ===
Studio albums:

- Into the Silence (2003)
