= Sami Vänskä =

Finnish musician

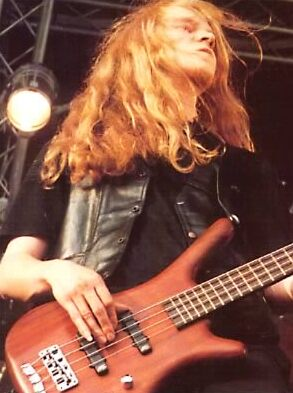

Background information
- Born: 26 September 1976 (age 50)
- Origin: Finland
- Occupation: Musician
- Instruments: Bass, drums
- Years active: 1994–2008, 2016
- Formerly of: Nattvindens Gråt; Nightwish; Root Remedy

Sami Vänskä (born 26 September 1976) is the former bassist of Finnish symphonic metal band Nightwish.

== Background ==
Vänskä started playing bass when he attended music school when he was nine years old. Rush, Faith No More, Red Hot Chili Peppers and Metallica has been cited as sources of inspiration to his bass playing. He also studied computer science in university.

When Emppu Vuorinen, Holopainen and Jukka Nevalainen, remembered Vänskä who was previously in the band Nattvindens Gråt, they asked if he wanted to play with them. Vänskä first appeared on the second studio album, Oceanborn. He played on the following tour but kept to himself while on tour – often staying at the hotel with Tapio Wilska, who was with the band for the tour. He worked on the band's third studio album Wishmaster and on the tour supporting it. He also played bass on the EP Over the Hills and Far Away. Following the release of the EP and its tour, Holopainen asked the band's manager, Ewo Pohjola, to tell Vänskä to leave Nightwish, when he felt that the musical differences between the two men were posing a threat to the band.

Vänskä played in the blues band Root Remedy after his dismissal from Nightwish. On 20 August 2016, he joined his former bandmates on stage to perform "Stargazers" on bass guitar after being asked by Holopainen in April that year if he wanted to perform a song with them.

== Discography ==
=== Nightwish ===
Studio albums

- Oceanborn (1998)
- Wishmaster (2000)

Live albums and EPs

- From Wishes to Eternity (2001)
- Over the Hills and Far Away (2001)

=== Nattvindens Gråt ===
Studio albums

- A Bard's Tale (1995)
- Chaos Without Theory (1997)
