= Nightwish discography =

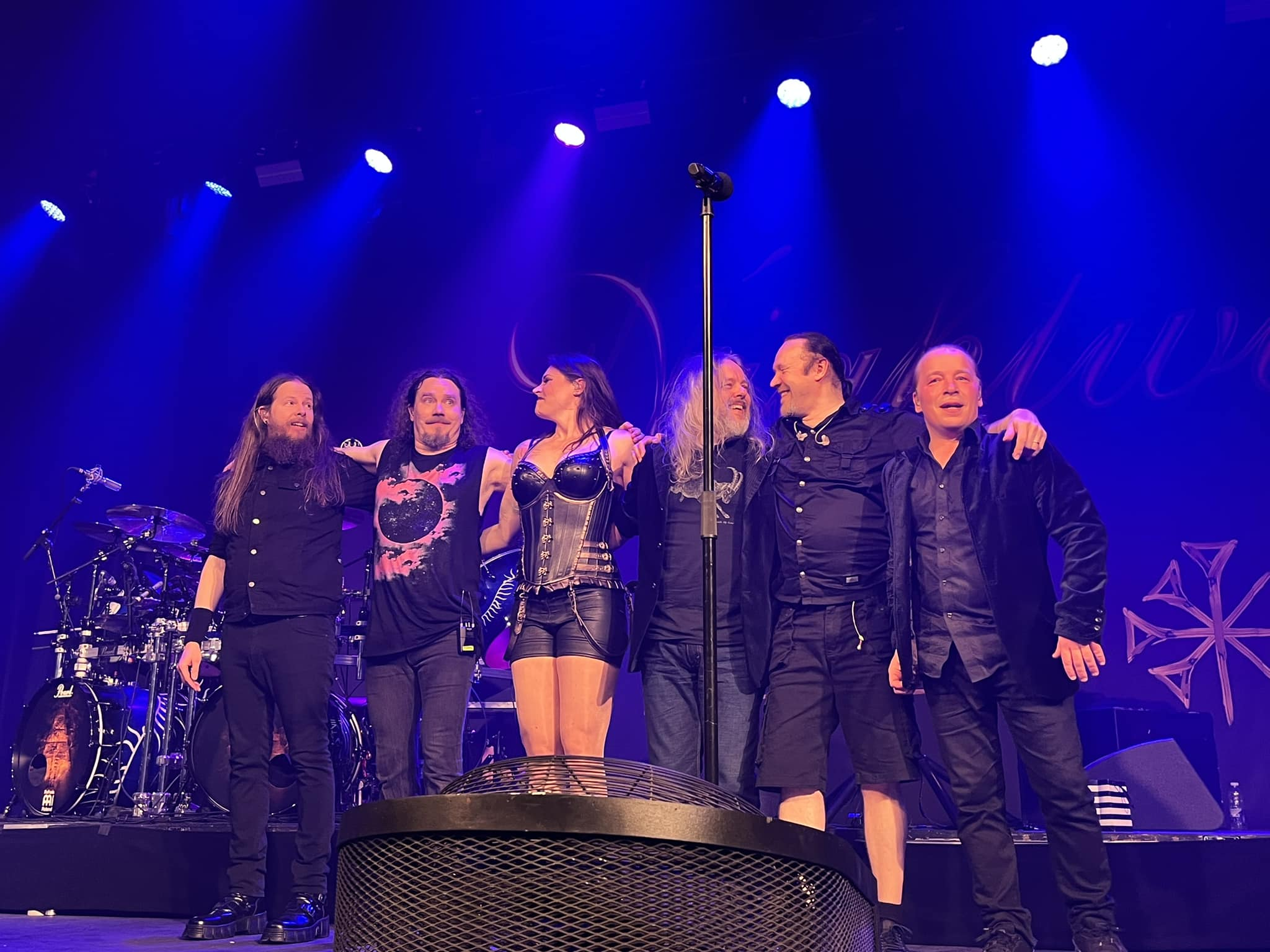
- Nightwish in 2022
- Studio albums: 10
- Extended plays: 1
- Soundtrack albums: 1
- Live albums: 6
- Compilation albums: 4
- Singles: 20
- Video albums: 6
- Music videos: 18

This is the discography of the Finnish symphonic metal band Nightwish, which consists of ten studio albums, one extended play, six live albums, four compilations, eighteen music videos and twenty singles.

The band was formed in 1996 by songwriter and keyboardist Tuomas Holopainen, guitarist Emppu Vuorinen, and former vocalist Tarja Turunen, and its current line-up has five members, although Turunen had been replaced by Anette Olzon and later by Floor Jansen, and the original bassist, Sami Vänskä, had been replaced by Marko Hietala, who himself left the band in 2021 to be replaced by Jukka Koskinen, while Kai Hahto has been the band's drummer since 2015.

Although Nightwish has been popular in Finland since 1997 when they released their debut album, Angels Fall First, they did not achieve worldwide fame until the release of the albums Oceanborn, Wishmaster and Century Child, which were released in 1998, 2000 and 2002, respectively, and their 2004 album, Once, sold more than one million copies by the end of 2005, becoming their breakthrough album with hit singles "Nemo" and "Wish I Had an Angel. On 21 October 2005 they played their last concert with Turunen on vocals and in May 2007 Anette Olzon was revealed as her replacement, releasing two albums with the band, including hit singles "Amaranth" and "Storytime", until her dismissal in 2012. Floor Jansen became the band's lead vocalist in 2012 and released three albums with the group until her departure in October 2026. Nightwish's most recent studio album, Yesterwynde, came out on September 20, 2024.

As of 2024, Nightwish is Finland's most successful music act having sold around 10 million albums and singles worldwide, including about 900,000 in Finland, over 1 million in Germany and over 500,000 in the U.S.

== Albums ==
=== Studio albums ===
List of studio albums, with selected chart positions, sales figures and certifications
Title	Album details	Peak chart positions										Sales	Certifications
Title	Album details	FIN	AUS	AUT	FRA	GER	JPN	SWE	SWI	UK	US	Sales	Certifications
Angels Fall First	Released: 30 September 1997; Label: Spinefarm; Format: CD, LP, cassette	5	—	—	—	—	—	—	—	—	—	FIN: 36,526	IFPI FIN: Gold
Oceanborn	Released: 7 December 1998; Label: Spinefarm; Format: CD, LP	2	—	—	—	74	—	—	—	—	—	FIN: 68,971	IFPI FIN: Platinum
Wishmaster	Released: 19 May 2000; Label: Spinefarm; Format: CD, LP	1	—	—	66	21	—	—	—	—	—	FIN: 79,447	IFPI FIN: Platinum; BVMI: Gold
Century Child	Released: 24 May 2002; Label: Spinefarm; Format: CD, LP	1	—	15	32	5	—	39	50	—	—	FIN: 86,072	IFPI FIN: 2× Platinum; BVMI: Gold
Once	Released: 7 June 2004; Label: Spinefarm, Nuclear Blast; Format: CD, LP	1	—	4	9	1	—	3	4	— (Note: Once did not enter the UK Albums Chart, but peaked at number 3 on the UK Rock Albums Chart.)	— (Note: Once did not chart on the Billboard 200, but peaked at number 42 on the Top Heatseekers chart.)	FIN: 107,288	IFPI FIN: 2× Platinum; BPI: Silver; BVMI: 3× Gold; IFPI AUT: Gold; IFPI SWI: Gold
Dark Passion Play	Released: 26 September 2007; Label: Spinefarm, Nuclear Blast, Roadrunner; Format: CD, LP, DD	1	42	5	6	1	54	4	1	25	84	FIN: 126,084	IFPI FIN: 2× Platinum; BPI: Silver; BVMI: Platinum; IFPI AUT: Gold; IFPI SWE: Gold; IFPI SWI: Gold
Imaginaerum	Released: 30 November 2011; Label: Sony Music, Nuclear Blast, Roadrunner; Format: CD, LP, DD	1	57	9	41	6	32	3	3	69	27	FIN: 67,932	IFPI FIN: 2× Platinum; BVMI: Gold; IFPI SWI: Gold
Endless Forms Most Beautiful	Released: 27 March 2015; Label: Sony Music, Nuclear Blast; Format: CD, LP, DD	1	15	4	12	2	31	4	2	12	34	FIN: 43,742	IFPI FIN: 2× Platinum; IFPI SWI: Gold
Human. :II: Nature.	Released: 10 April 2020; Label: Nuclear Blast; Format: CD, LP, DD	1	7	2	26	1	39	11	2	28	110		
Yesterwynde	Released: 20 September 2024; Label: Nuclear Blast; Format: CD, LP, DD, Blu-ray	1	25	2	15	2	50	6	2	20	—		
"—" denotes a recording that did not chart or was not released in that territory.

=== Live albums ===
Title	Album details	Peak chart positions										Sales	Certifications
Title	Album details	FIN	AUT	BEL	CZE	FRA	GER	NLD	SWE	SWI	UK Rock	Sales	Certifications
From Wishes to Eternity	Released: April 2001; Recorded: 29 December 2000 in Tampere, Finland; Format: CD, DVD, VHS	5	—	—	—	—	—	—	—	—	—	FIN: 29,725	IFPI FIN: Gold
End of an Era	Released: 1 June 2006; Recorded: 21 October 2005 in Helsinki, Finland; Format: CD, LP, DVD, Blu-ray	7	41	40	—	24	3	3	35	18	7	FIN: 27,457	IFPI FIN: Gold
Made in Hong Kong	Released: 1 March 2009; Recorded: 2006–2008; Format: CD+DVD, LP	2	26	41	14	72	15	20	54	38	10		
Showtime, Storytime	Released: 29 November 2013; Recorded: 3 August 2013 in Wacken, Germany; Format: CD, DVD, Blu-ray	23	—	158	37	—	6	—	—	—	5		
Vehicle of Spirit	Released: 16 December 2016 / 6 January 2017; Recorded: 30 July 2015 in Tampere, Finland and on 19 December 2015 in London, England; Format: CD, DVD, Blu-ray	—	—	—	—	182	14	—	—	—	9		
Decades: Live in Buenos Aires	Released: 6 December 2019; Recorded: 30 September 2018 in Buenos Aires, Argentina; Format: CD, LP, DVD, Blu-ray	1	—	135	85	172	—	50	—	—	1		
"—" denotes releases that did not chart or was not released.

=== Video albums ===
Year	Video details	Peak chart positions						Sales	Certifications
Year	Video details	FIN	AUT	GER	NLD	SWI	UK Rock	Sales	Certifications
From Wishes to Eternity	Released: April 2001; Label: Spinefarm Records; Format: VHS, DVD	7	—	—	—	—	—	FIN: 12,712	IFPI FIN: Platinum; BVMI: Gold
End of Innocence	Released: 6 October 2003; Label: Spinefarm Records; Format: DVD	4	—	62	—	—	—	FIN: 11,041	IFPI FIN: Gold; BVMI: Gold
End of an Era	Released: 1 June 2006; Label: Nuclear Blast; Format: DVD, Blu-ray	1	2	—	3	—	9	FIN: 19,955	IFPI FIN: Platinum; BVMI: 3× Gold
Showtime, Storytime	Released: 29 November 2013; Label: Nuclear Blast; Format: DVD, Blu-ray	1	9	—	11	3	—		
Vehicle of Spirit	Released: 16 December 2016 / 6 January 2017; Label: Nuclear Blast; Format: DVD, Blu-ray	—	—	14	—	—	9		
Decades: Live in Buenos Aires	Released: 6 December 2019; Label: Nuclear Blast; Format: DVD, Blu-ray	1	—	—	—	—	94		
Virtual Live Show from the Islanders Arms 2021	Released: 11 March 2022; Label: Deggael; Format: DVD	—	—	—	—	—	—		
"—" denotes releases that did not chart or was not released.

=== Compilations ===
Title	Compilation details	Peak chart positions										Sales	Certifications
Title	Compilation details	FIN	AUT	CZE	FRA	GER	NOR	NLD	SWE	SWI	UK Rock	Sales	Certifications
Tales from the Elvenpath	Released: 17 October 2004; Label: Drakkar; Format: CD	—	19	—	—	6	—	—	—	19	—		BVMI: Gold
Highest Hopes: The Best of Nightwish	Released: 17 September 2005; Label: Spinefarm; Format: CD	1	13	71	—	17	5	41	14	10	9	FIN: 103,950	IFPI FIN: 2× Platinum; BVMI: Platinum
Walking in the Air: The Greatest Ballads	Released: 27 May 2011; Label: Sony Music; Format: CD	45	65	—	—	32	—	—	—	35	—		
Decades	Released: 9 March 2018; Label: Nuclear Blast; Format: CD, LP	1	19	11	90	5	—	68	—	7	3		
"—" denotes releases that did not chart or was not released.

=== Box sets ===
Title	Box details	Peak chart positions
Title	Box details	FIN
Lokikirja	Released: 18 November 2009; Label: Roadrunner; Format: CD	21

=== Soundtracks ===
Title	Album details	Peak chart positions		
Title	Album details	FIN	BEL	UK Rock
Imaginaerum: The Score	Released: 9 November 2012; Format: CD	12	101	50

== Extended plays ==
Title	EP details	Peak chart positions					Sales	Certifications
Title	EP details	FIN	AUT	FRA	GER	SWI	Sales	Certifications
Over the Hills and Far Away	Released: 25 June 2001; Label: Spinefarm, Century Media, Drakkar; Format: CD, LP	1	54	139	85	79	FIN: 36,518	IFPI FIN: 2× Platinum

== Singles ==
Title	Year	Peak chart positions										Sales	Certifications	Album
Title	Year	FIN	AUT	FRA	GER	HUN	NLD	SPA	SWE	SWI	UK Rock	Sales	Certifications	Album
"The Carpenter"	1997	3	—	—	—	—	—	—	—	—	—			Angels Fall First
"Sacrament of Wilderness"	1998	1	—	—	—	—	—	—	—	—	—	FIN: 7,616	IFPI FIN: Gold	Oceanborn
"Walking in the Air"	1999	1	—	—	—	—	—	—	—	—	—	FIN: 8,168	IFPI FIN: Gold	Oceanborn
"Sleeping Sun"	1999	1	—	—	34	—	—	—	—	—	—	FIN: 6,169	IFPI FIN: Gold	Oceanborn
"Deep Silent Complete"	2000	3	—	—	—	—	—	—	—	—	—	FIN: 6,630		Wishmaster
"Ever Dream"	2002	1	—	—	—	—	—	—	—	—	—	FIN: 11,151	IFPI FIN: Platinum	Century Child
"Bless the Child"	2002	1	—	—	63	—	55	—	—	—	—	FIN: 11,010	IFPI FIN: Platinum	Century Child
"Nemo"	2004	1	12	64	6	1	64	—	12	14	4	FIN: 13,109	IFPI FIN: Platinum; BVMI: Gold	Once
"Wish I Had an Angel"	2004	1	47	—	36	3	65	20	11	40	6	FIN: 5,460	IFPI FIN: Gold	Once
"Kuolema Tekee Taiteilijan"	2004	1	—	—	—	3	—	—	—	—	—			Once
"The Siren"	2005	3	—	—	51	1	—	—	30	59	4			Once
"Sleeping Sun"	2005	1	47	—	34	—	—	—	—	—	5	FIN: 6,169	IFPI FIN: Gold	Highest Hopes
"Amaranth"	2007	1	30	62	16	1	47	1	13	14	1	FIN: 12,609	IFPI FIN: Platinum	Dark Passion Play
"Erämaan Viimeinen"	2007	1	—	—	—	—	—	—	—	—	—			Dark Passion Play
"Bye Bye Beautiful"	2008	5	—	54	35	4	—	4	—	—	2			Dark Passion Play
"The Islander"	2008	1	—	91	—	—	—	5	—	—	—			Dark Passion Play
"Storytime"	2011	1	57	19	39	2	—	2	—	31	5			Imaginaerum
"The Crow, the Owl and the Dove"	2012	1	—	—	82	—	—	5	—	—	—			Imaginaerum
"Élan"	2015	3	53	200	33	5	—	—	—	33	11			Endless Forms Most Beautiful
"Noise"	2020	22	—	—	—	19	—	—	—	—	—			Human. :II: Nature.
"Perfume of the Timeless"	2024	—	—	—	—	—	—	—	—	—	—			Yesterwynde
"The Day of..."	2024	—	—	—	—	—	—	—	—	—	—			Yesterwynde
"An Ocean of Strange Islands"	2024	—	—	—	—	—	—	—	—	—	—			Yesterwynde
"—" denotes releases that did not chart or was not released.

=== Promotional singles ===
Title	Year	Album
"Passion and the Opera"	1998	Oceanborn
"The Kinslayer"	2000	Wishmaster
"Sleepwalker"	2000	Wishmaster
"Eva"	2007	Dark Passion Play
"Amaranth" (live)	2009	Made in Hong Kong
"Ghost Love Score" (live)	2013	Showtime, Storytime
"Storytime" (live)	2013	Showtime, Storytime
"Endless Forms Most Beautiful"	2015	Endless Forms Most Beautiful
"My Walden"	2016	Endless Forms Most Beautiful
"Devil & the Deep Dark Ocean" (live)	2019	Decades: Live in Buenos Aires
"Harvest"	2021	Human. :II: Nature.
"How's the Heart?"	2021	Human. :II: Nature.
"Music"	2021	Human. :II: Nature.

== Music videos ==
Title	Year	Director
"The Carpenter"	1998	Sami Käyhkö
"Sacrament of Wilderness"	1998	Sami Käyhkö
"Sleeping Sun"	1998	Sami Käyhkö
"Over the Hills and Far Away"	2001	Pasi Takula
"Bless the Child"	2002	Pasi Takula
"End of All Hope"	2002	Pasi Takula
"Nemo"	2004	Antti Jokinen
"Wish I Had an Angel"	2004	Uwe Boll
"Sleeping Sun"	2005	Joern Heitmann
"While Your Lips Are Still Red"	2007	Markku Pölönen
"Amaranth"	2007	Antti Jokinen
"Bye Bye Beautiful"	2007	Antti Jokinen
"The Islander"	2008	Stobe Harju
"Storytime"	2011	Stobe Harju
"Élan"	2015	Ville Lipiäinen
"Endless Forms Most Beautiful"	2015	Ville Lipiäinen
"Noise"	2020	Stobe Harju
"Ad Astra"	2020	Ville Lipiäinen
"Perfume of the Timeless"	2024	Ville Lipiäinen
"The Day of..."	2024	Stobe Harju
"Lanternlight"	2024	Stobe Harju

== Demos ==
Title	Details	Notes
Nightwish demo	Recorded: December 1996–January 1997 at Huvikeskus studio; Members: Turunen, Holopainen and Vuorinen	Three-track demo with "Nightwish", "The Forever Moments" and "Etiäinen".
Angels Fall First demo	Recorded: April–May 1997 at Huvikeskus studio; Members: Turunen, Holopainen, Vuorinen and Nevalainen	Three-track demo with "The Carpenter", "Astral Romance" and "Angels Fall First", which eventually became the Angels Fall First album.

== See also ==
- Tarja Turunen discography
