= List of Dark Passion Play editions =

Dark Passion Play is the sixth studio album by Finnish symphonic power metal quintet Nightwish, released on September 26, 2007 in Finland, September 28 in Europe and October 2, 2007 in the United States. It was the first Nightwish album with the band's new lead singer, Anette Olzon, and the first album not featuring former vocalist Tarja Turunen, who was dismissed in October 2005. Lead songwriter Tuomas Holopainen has referred to it as the 'album that saved his life'.

== Track listing ==
=== Standard edition ===
No.	Title	Lyrics	Music	Notes	Length
1.	"The Poet and the Pendulum"	Holopainen	Holopainen	Feat. Guy Elliott - treble vocals.	13:54
2.	"Bye Bye Beautiful"	Holopainen	Holopainen	The fourth single.	04:14
3.	"Amaranth"	Holopainen	Holopainen	The second single.	03:51
4.	"Cadence of Her Last Breath"	Holopainen	Holopainen		04:14
5.	"Master Passion Greed"	Holopainen	Holopainen		06:02
6.	"Eva"	Holopainen	Holopainen	The first single (radio/Internet only)	04:24
7.	"Sahara"	Holopainen	Holopainen		05:47
8.	"Whoever Brings the Night"	Holopainen	Vuorinen		04:17
9.	"For the Heart I Once Had"	Holopainen	Holopainen		03:55
10.	"The Islander"	Holopainen	Hietala	The fifth single.	05:05
11.	"Last of the Wilds"	—	Holopainen	Instrumental. Third single	05:40
12.	"7 Days to the Wolves"	Holopainen	Holopainen, Hietala		07:03
13.	"Meadows of Heaven"	Holopainen	Holopainen		07:10
14.	"Escapist"	Holopainen	Holopainen	Bonus track on Japanese release.	04:57

=== Special editions ===
Nuclear Blast, Spinefarm Records and Roadrunner Records each released special editions that included an instrumental version of the album, which contain instruments that are hard to hear, or are omitted, from the original version of the album.

==== Nuclear Blast special 3-CD gold box ====
In addition to a second disc containing an instrumental version of the album, a third disc was included containing these bonus tracks:

1. "Escapist"
2. "Meadows of Heaven" (orchestral version)
3. "The Poet and the Pendulum" (demo version)

==== Platinum edition ====
Instead of instrumental tracks, the second disc featured a collection of B-Sides from the singles "The Islander", Bye Bye Beautiful, and "Erämaan viimeinen", excluding only the instrumental version of Escapist.

1. Erämaan viimeinen
2. Escapist
3. Meadows of Heaven (orchestral version)
4. The Poet and the Pendulum (demo version)
5. Bye Bye Beautiful (DJ Orkidea remix)

=== B-side tracks ===
"Amaranth" single

- "Reach" (Amaranth demo version) – 3:57
- "Eva" (demo version) – 4:18
- "Amaranth" (orchestral version) – 3:51
- "Eva" (orchestral version) – 4:28
- "While Your Lips Are Still Red" – 4:22

"Erämaan viimeinen" single

- "Erämaan viimeinen" – 5:10

"Bye Bye Beautiful" single

- "The Poet and the Pendulum" (demo version) – 13:41
- "Bye Bye Beautiful" (DJ Orkidea remix) – 12:14
- "Escapist" – 4:57

"The Islander" single

- "The Islander" (radio edit) – 3:57
- "Meadows of Heaven" (orchestral version) – 7:14
- "Escapist" (instrumental version) – 4:57

=== Exclusive digital album ===
Roadrunner Records released a digital only album called The Sound of Nightwish Reborn on September 2, 2008. The track list is composed of demos and b-sides from Dark Passion Play.

1. "Escapist"
2. "Reach" ("Amaranth" demo)
3. "Eva" (demo version)
4. "While Your Lips Are Still Red"
5. "The Poet and the Pendulum" (demo version)
6. "Amaranth" (orchestral version)
7. "Eva" (orchestral version)
8. "Bye Bye Beautiful" (DJ Orkidea remix)
9. "Meadows of Heaven" (orchestral version)
