= List of Nightwish band members =

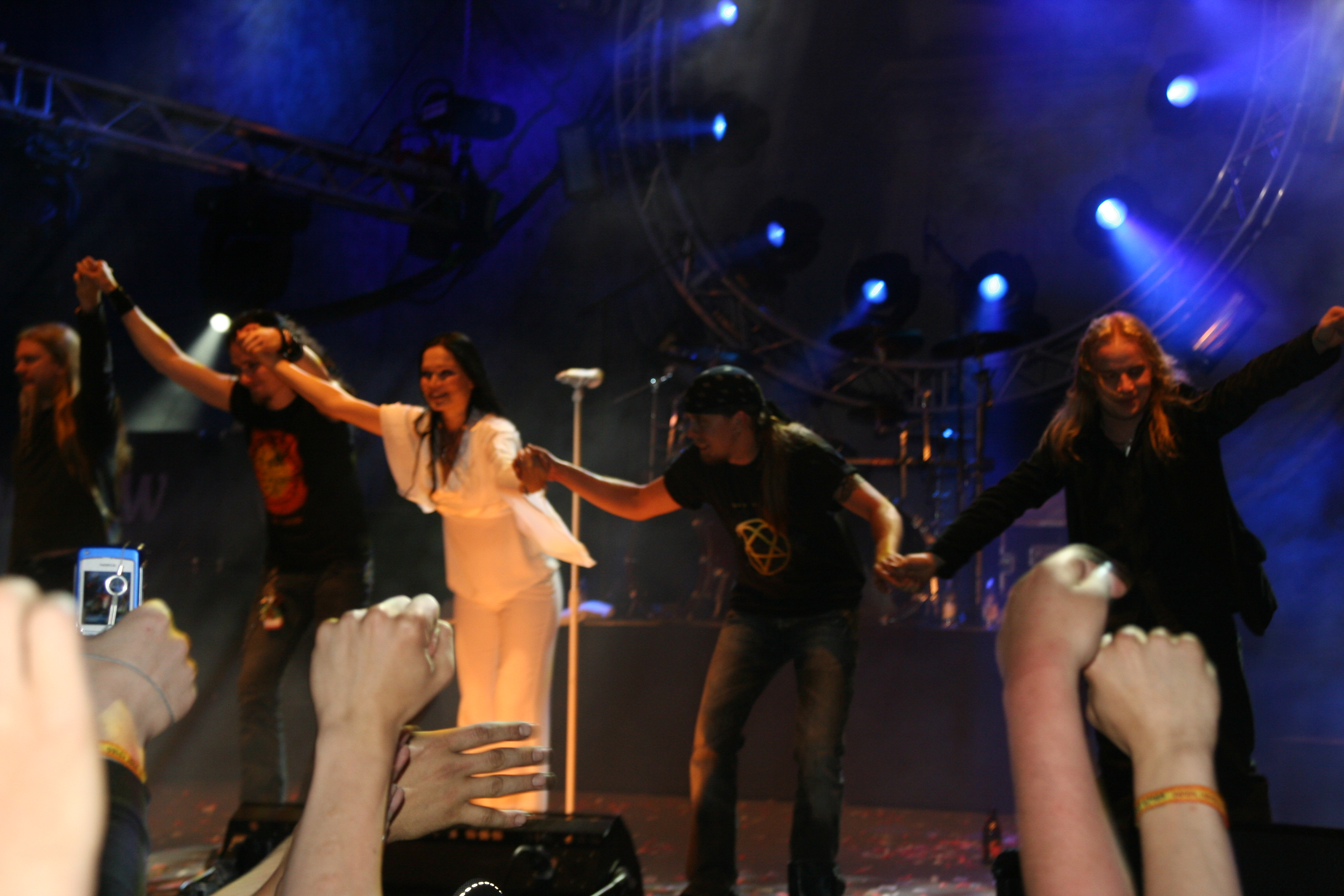
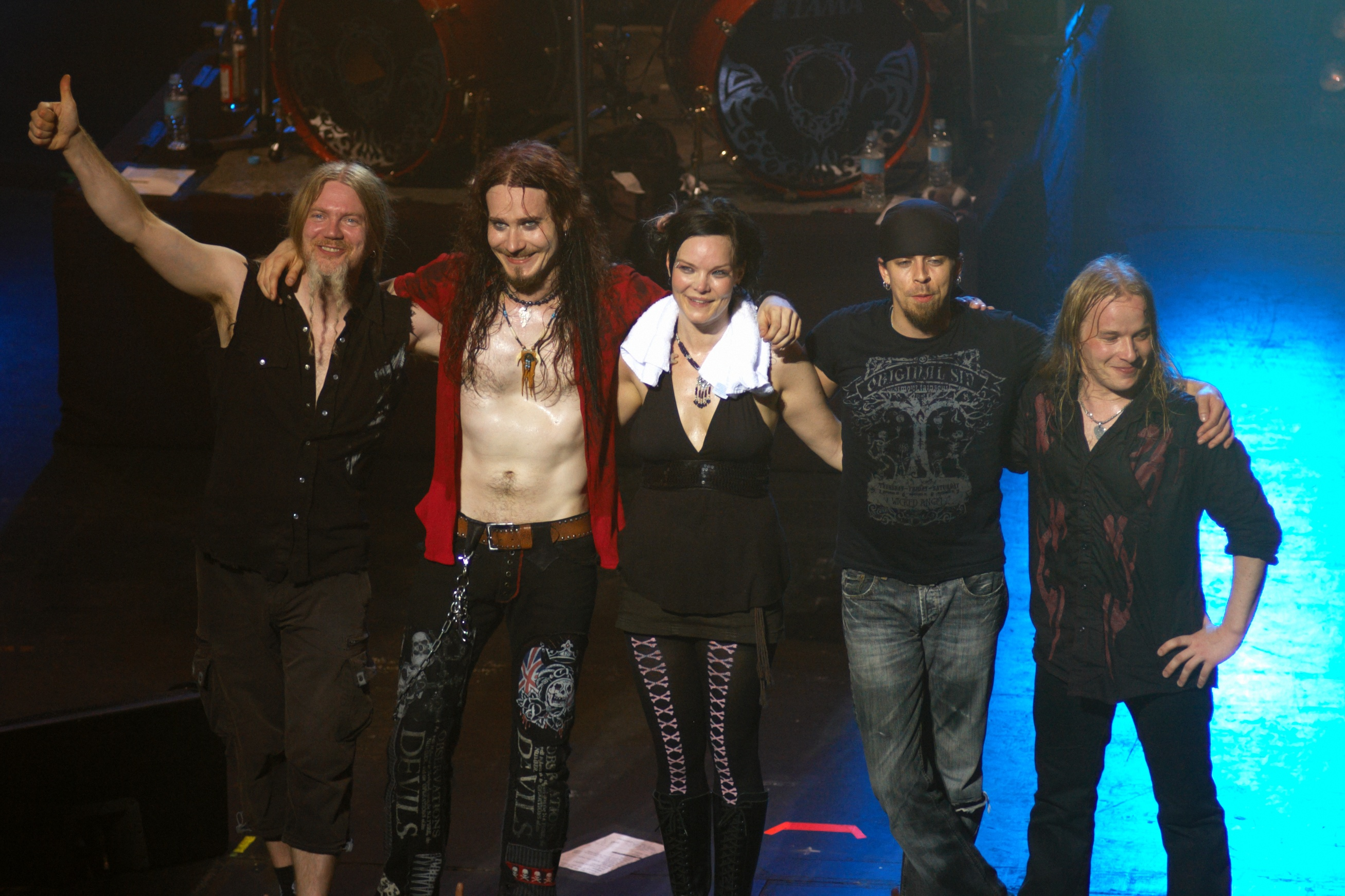
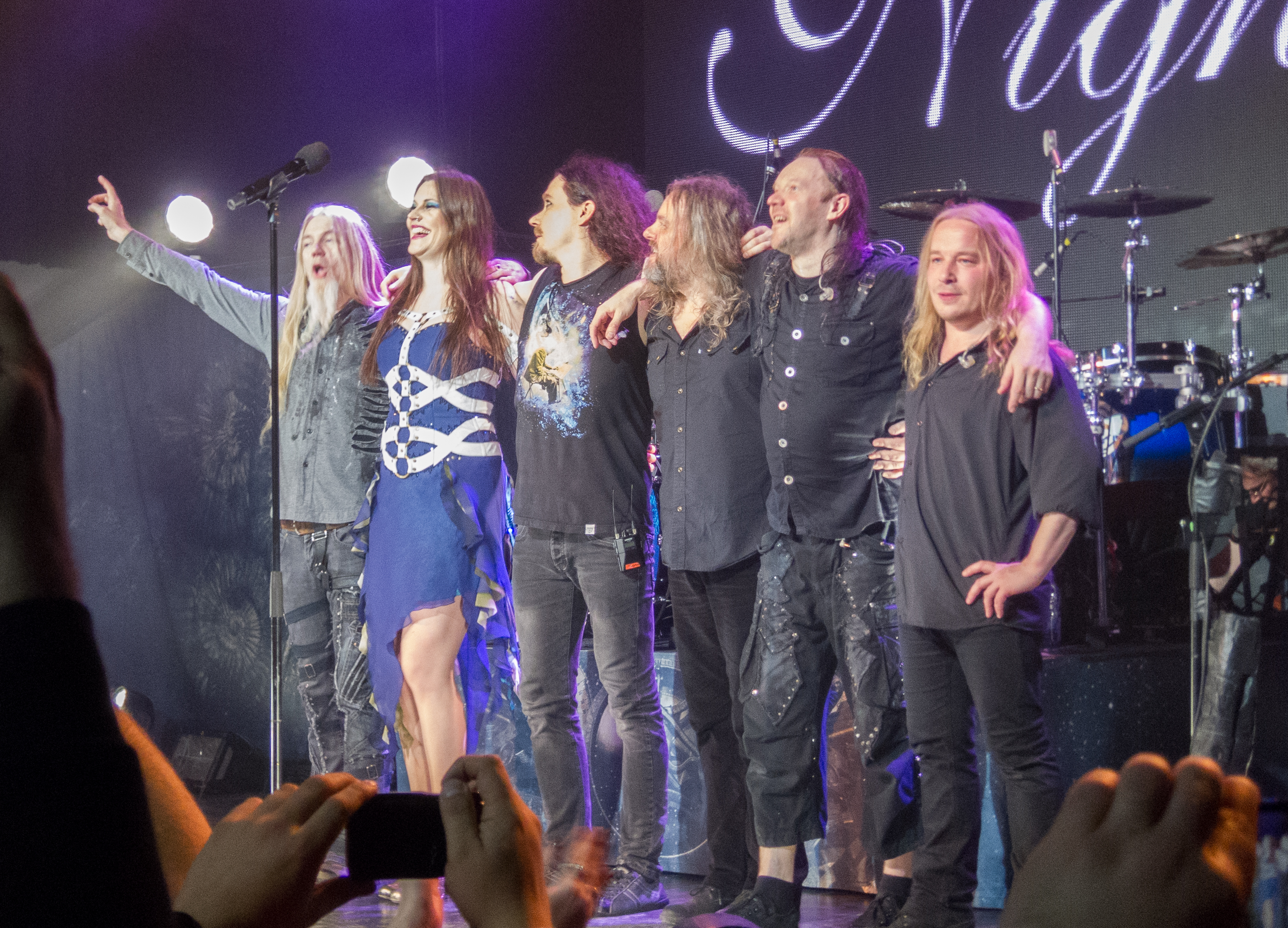
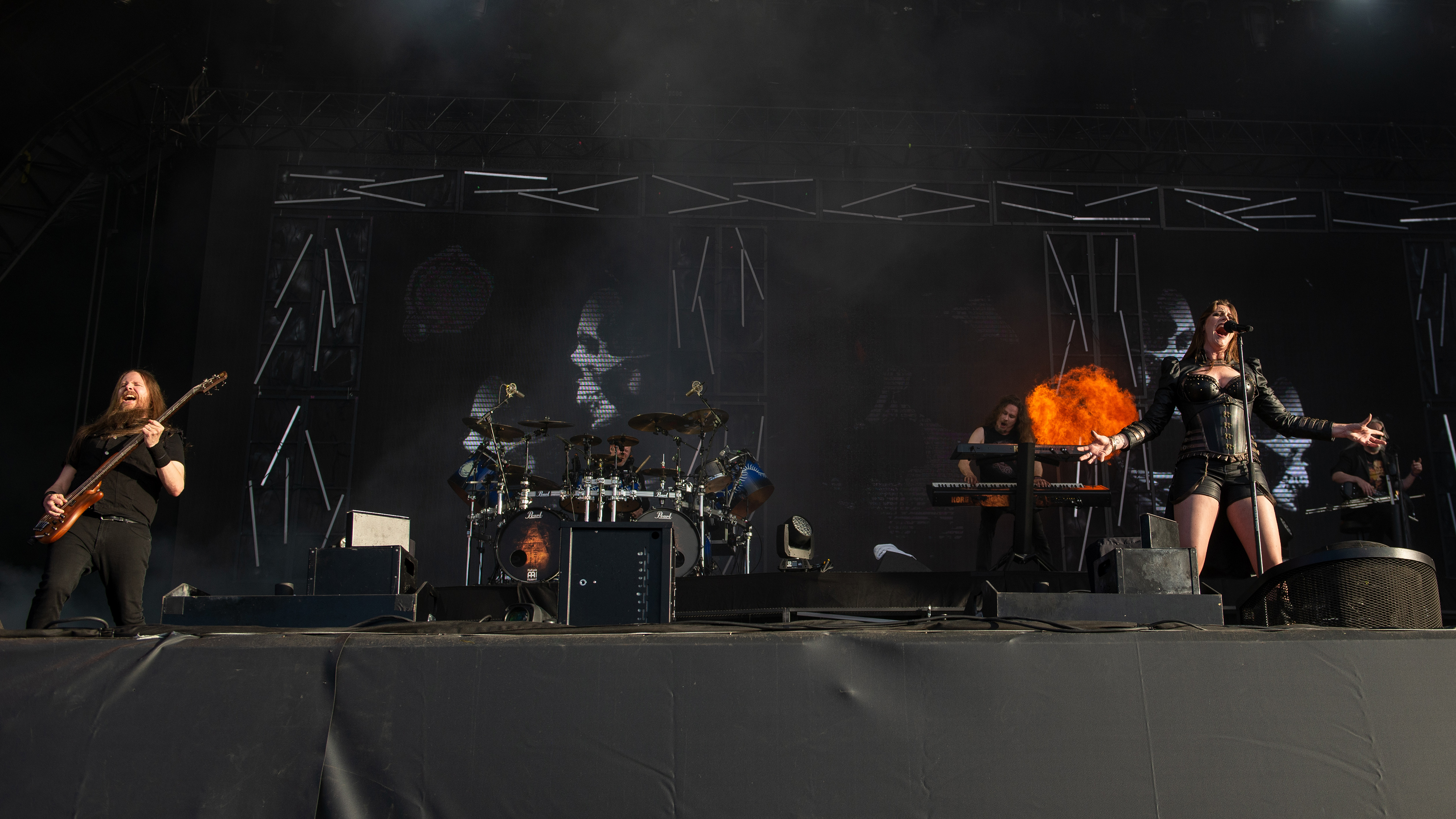
Nightwish performing in 2005, 2009, 2016 and 2022, showing the different eras of the band.

Nightwish are a symphonic metal band from Kitee, Finland, formed in 1996 by songwriter/keyboardist Tuomas Holopainen, guitarist Emppu Vuorinen, and vocalist Tarja Turunen. The group currently consists of Holopainen and Vuorinen, alongside multi-instrumentalist Troy Donockley (official since 2013, touring from 2007), drummer Kai Hahto (official since 2019, touring from 2014) and bassist Jukka Koskinen (since 2021).

== History ==
Although Nightwish has been prominent in their home country since the release of their first single, "The Carpenter" (1997) and debut album Angels Fall First, they did not achieve worldwide fame until the release of the albums Oceanborn, Wishmaster and Century Child, which were released in 1998, 2000 and 2002 respectively. Their 2004 album, Once, which has sold more than 1.2 million copies, led to Nightwish video clips being shown on MTV in the United States and inclusion of their music in US movie soundtracks. Their biggest US hit single, "Wish I Had an Angel" (2004), made it onto three US film soundtracks as a means to promote their North American tour. The band produced three more singles and two music videos for the album, as well as "Sleeping Sun", from the 2005 "best of" compilation album, Highest Hopes, prior to vocalist Tarja Turunen’s dismissal.

In May 2007, former Alyson Avenue frontwoman, Anette Olzon, was revealed as Turunen’s replacement, and in the autumn, the band released a new album – Dark Passion Play, which has sold more than 1.5 million copies. The supporting tour started on 6 October 2007 and ended on 19 September 2009. A new E.P./live album, Made in Hong Kong (And in Various Other Places), was released in March 2009 as a MCD/DVD.

Nightwish has received eleven awards from both the Emma-gaala Awards, from thirteen nominations, and one Echo Awards from two nominations. Nightwish has also received 2 nominations from the Metal Hammer Golden God Awards, but has not received an award; Nightwish already won awards from MTV Europe Music Awards and from World Music Awards. On 15 October 2026, the band parted ways with Floor Jansen.

== Members ==
=== Current ===
Image	Name	Years active	Instruments	Release contributions
	Tuomas Holopainen	1996–present	keyboards; vocals (1996–1998)	all releases
	Emppu Vuorinen	1996–present	guitars; bass (1997)	all releases
	Troy Donockley (Note: Donockley (born 30 May 1964) is an English composer and multi-instrumentalist most known for his playing of uilleann pipes. He performed on Dark Passion Play and Imaginaerum. He accompanied the band on most of their Dark Passion Play tour and is featured on the music video for the single "The Islander". When the band released their latest album Imaginaerum in 2011, he was asked to play a wide array of instruments, including uilleann pipes, Celtic bouzouki, and tin and low whistles. He was asked to supply some Cumbrian chanting on the song "The Crow, The Owl, and the Dove." He also joined the band on the Imaginaerum World Tour. On 9 October 2013, he was confirmed as a full-time member of Nightwish.)	2013–present (touring & session member 2007–2013)	uilleann pipes; tin whistle; bouzouki; bodhrán; vocals; guitars	all releases since Dark Passion Play (2007)
	Kai Hahto (Note: Hahto (born 31 December 1973) stepped in to record the drums for the Endless Forms Most Beautiful album, replacing Jukka Nevalainen, who went on hiatus from the band due to insomnia, and performed in all live shows to date. In July 2019, Nevalainen announced he would not be returning to the band, as Hahto had become Nightwish's full-time drummer. Prior to replacing Nevalainen, Hahto was Nevalainen's drum tech as well as being a founder of Wintersun.)	2019–present (touring & session member 2014–2019)	drums; percussion	all releases since Endless Forms Most Beautiful (2015)
	Jukka Koskinen (Note: Koskinen was announced to perform with the band on tour throughout 2021 and 2022. On August 21, 2022, he was announced to be the new bass player for Nightwish.)	2022–present (touring member 2021–2022)	bass	Yesterwynde (2024)

=== Former ===
Image	Name	Years active	Instruments	Release contributions
	Tarja Turunen (Note: Tarja (born 17 August 1977) is a Finnish singer-songwriter, composer and actress, whose work includes eight solo albums. She was dismissed from the band on 22 October 2005 after nine years, at the end of the Once Upon a Tour. In 2006, Turunen released a Christmas album, Henkäys Ikuisuudesta, with a support classical tour between 25 November and 26 December. Since 2007, she has been active as a successful solo performer with her own band.)	1996–2005	lead vocals	all releases from Angels Fall First (1997) to Once (2004)
	Jukka Nevalainen (Note: Nevalainen (born 21 April 1978) is a Finnish drummer. He spent his early years in the city of Kitee; his drumming career started at age eleven when his music teacher at school told him that a new educational program for music was opening, and he thought Nevalainen would fit in well as a drummer. His first band was The Highway, but he joined his first real band at the age of 15–16. The band had a rehearsal place, but was restricted to practicing only a couple of days a week. After he left that band, he joined up with Emppu Vuorinen and they got a permanent practice place. Nevalainen announced his departure from the band in July 2019 after being on hiatus from 2014 due to persistent insomnia. Kai Hahto who had previously filled in for Nevalainen for the 2015 album and the subsequent world tours has replaced Nevalainen.)	1997–2019 (on hiatus August 2014 – July 2019)	drums; percussion	all releases from Angels Fall First (1997) to Imaginaerum (2011)
	Sami Vänskä (Note: Sami (born 26 September 1976) started playing bass as a private study. He has played in a few bands which have been mostly from the metal genre. He started his career in the band Nattvindens Gråt, with Tuomas Holopainen. He made two albums, A Bard's Tale (1995) and Chaos Without Theory (1997), and a demo, Dar Svanar Flyger (1995), with them. He joined Nightwish for the second studio album, Oceanborn, and was soon replaced by Marko Hietala.)	1998–2001	bass	all releases from Oceanborn (1998) to Over the Hills and Far Away (2001)
	Marko Hietala (Note: Hietala (born 14 January 1966) is a Finnish bassist and vocalist, who is often seen as an icon for the Finnish metal scene. He is also the vocalist and bassist as well as composer/lyricist for heavy metal band Tarot. He joined Nightwish following the departure of previous bassist Sami Vänskä. He was a prominent guest musician in Delain, a project involving many members of the gothic/symphonic metal community. Hietala is the bassist and lends his voice to a number of songs. He also participated in the recording of Invitation, by Altaria, providing backing vocals. He has also been part of the bands Sinergy and Northern Kings. In Delain, he played the bass for the album Lucidity and was also the main male vocalist on the album. He is also featured as vocalist on two of the songs on Delain's album April Rain. In March 2009, Hietala joined the band Sapattivuosi, they cover Black Sabbath songs in Finnish. On January 12, 2021, Marko announced his retirement from the band and from the music industry.)	2002–2021	bass; guitars; vocals	all releases from Century Child (2002) to Human. :II: Nature (2020)
	Anette Olzon (Note: Olzon (born 21 June 1971) is a Swedish singer. She replaced Tarja Turunen after her dismissal on 21 October 2005. Olzon was formerly the vocalist in the Swedish AOR band Alyson Avenue. After her admission into Nightwish, she played with several bands, in studio and live, including Brother Firetribe and Pain, and will release a new album in the near future, under her own name. Anette's departure from Nightwish was announced on 1 October 2012, midway through their North American tour, and Floor Jansen took over on vocals for the remainder of the Imaginaerum World Tour.)	2007–2012	lead vocals	all releases from Dark Passion Play (2007) to Imaginaerum (2011)
	Floor Jansen (Note: Jansen (born 21 February 1981) is a Dutch soprano singer, who was the lead singer of the symphonic metal band After Forever which disbanded in 2009, and the singer for ReVamp which disbanded in 2016. She is also a member of supergroup Star One. She started touring with Nightwish on 1 October 2012 when Anette Olzon parted from the band. She was originally scheduled to play with the band until the end of the Imaginaerum World Tour. On 9 October 2013, she was confirmed as the new full-time lead vocalist for Nightwish. Jansen's side-project Northward released their first album in October 2018.)	2013–2026 (touring member 2012–2013)	lead vocals	all releases from Endless Forms Most Beautiful (2015) to Yesterwynde (2024)

=== Touring ===
Image	Name	Years active	Instruments	Notes
	Samppa Hirvonen	1997–1998	bass	During the debut tour.
	Marianna Pellinen	1997–1998	backing vocals; keyboards	During the debut tour, as well as certain promotions and performances for Oceanborn.

== Guest appearances ==
Years	Artist	Albums / songs	Instrument	Notes
2000–2002	Sam Hardwick	"Dead Boy's Poem" in Wishmaster; "Bless the Child" and "Beauty of the Beast" in Century Child	Backing vocals	Live in Playback
2000	Ike Vil	"The Kinslayer" in Wishmaster; "Bless the Child" in Century Child	Vocals	Live in Playback
2001	Tony Kakko	"Over the Hills and Far Away" and "Astral Romance" in Over the Hills and Far Away	Vocals	Featured in the 2001 DVD, From Wishes to Eternity (in song Beauty and the Beast)
2004	John Two-Hawks	"Creek Mary's Blood" in Once	Vocals, Native American flute	Featured in 2006 DVD, End of an Era
2004–2007	The London Session Orchestra	Once and Dark Passion Play	All the chorus effects and orchestral sounds	Live in Playback
2007	Johanna Salomaa	The title song in "Erämaan viimeinen" single	Vocals	Indica frontwoman
