= List of awards and nominations received by Nightwish =

Nightwish awards and nominations
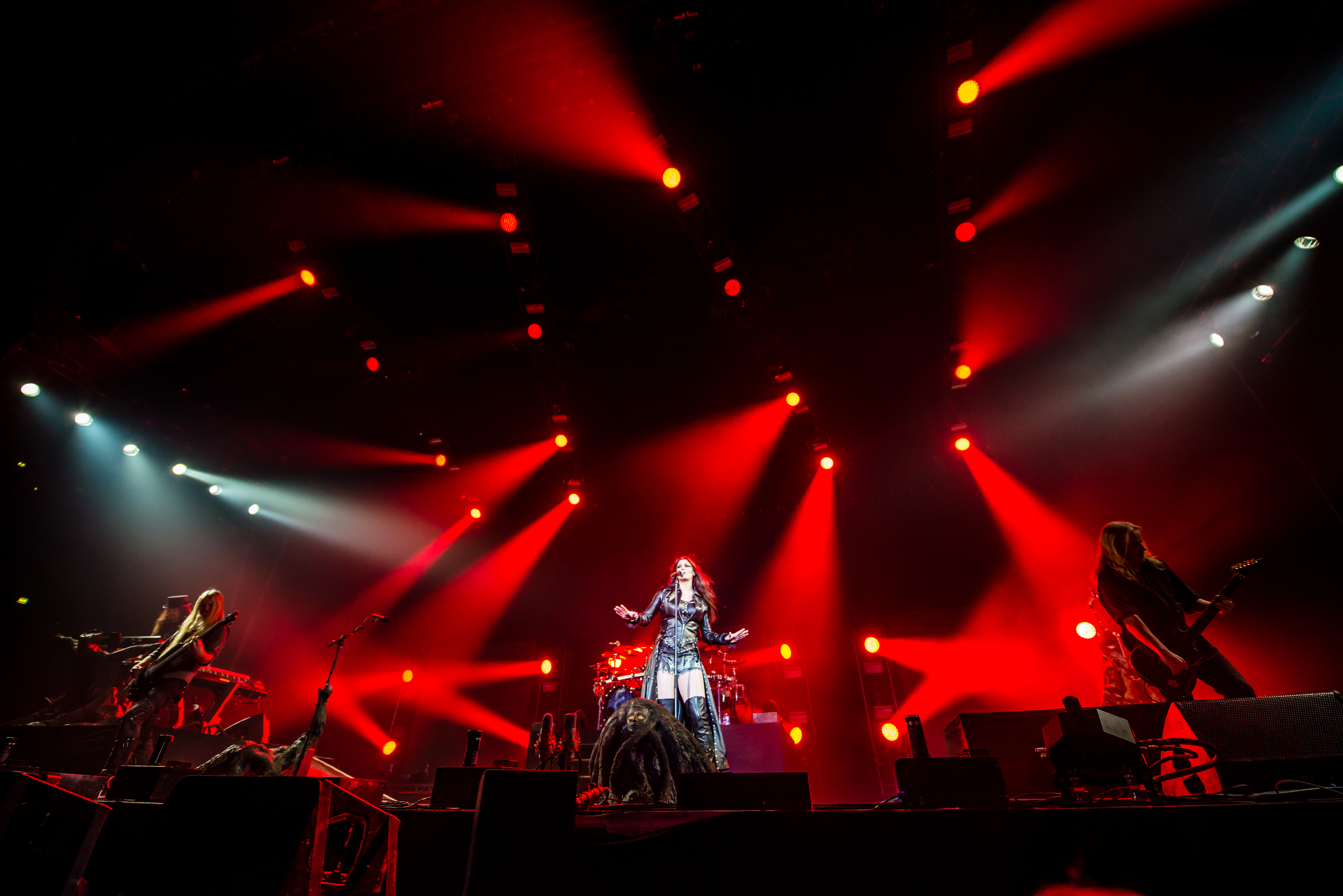
- Nightwish performing in Oberhausen, Germany, in November 2015
Awards and nominations
Award	Wins	Nominations
Echo	1	2
Kerrang!	0	1
MTV Europe	1	1
World Music	1	1
Emma Gaala Awards	14	19
Metal Storm Awards	1	3
Metal Hammer Golden God Awards	0	2

Totals (Note: Certain award groups do not simply award one winner. They acknowledge several different recipients, have runners-up, and have third place. Since this is a specific recognition and is different from losing an award, runner-up mentions are considered wins in this award tally. For simplification and to avoid errors, each award in this list has been presumed to have had a prior nomination.)
- Wins: 22
- Nominations: 41

Nightwish is a band from Kitee, Finland, formed in 1996 by songwriter/keyboardist Tuomas Holopainen, guitarist Emppu Vuorinen, and former vocalist Tarja Turunen.

Although Nightwish has been prominent in their home country since the release of their first single, “The Carpenter” (1997) and debut album Angels Fall First, they did not achieve worldwide fame until the release of the albums Oceanborn, Wishmaster and Century Child, which were released in 1998, 2000 and 2002 respectively. Their 2004 album, Once, which has sold more than 1.3 million copies, led to Nightwish video clips being shown on MTV in the United States and inclusion of their music in US movie soundtracks. Their biggest US hit single, “Wish I Had an Angel” (2004), made it onto three US film soundtracks as a means to promote their North American tour. The band produced three more singles and two music videos for the album, as well as “Sleeping Sun”, from the 2005 “best of” compilation album, Highest Hopes, prior to vocalist Tarja Turunen’s dismissal.

In May 2007, former Alyson Avenue frontwoman, Anette Olzon, was revealed as Turunen’s replacement, and in the autumn, the band released a new album - Dark Passion Play, which has sold more than 2.0 million copies. The supporting tour started on October 6, 2007 and ended on September 19, 2009. A new E.P./live album, Made in Hong Kong (And in Various Other Places), was released in March 2009 as a MCD/DVD.

Nightwish has received eleven awards from both the Emma Gaala Awards, from thirteen nominations, and one Echo Awards from two nominations. Nightwish has also received 2 nominations from the Metal Hammer Golden God Awards but has not received an award; Nightwish already won awards from MTV Europe Music Awards and from World Music Awards.

== Finnish awards ==
=== Emma Gaala Awards ===
The Emma Gaala is a Finnish music gala arranged yearly by IFPI Finland (ÄKT), awarding the most distinguished artists and music professionals of the year. It has been arranged since 1983, excluding the years 1988–1990.

Nightwish was nominated in 2003, 2005, 2008, 2013, 2016, 2021, and 2025:

Year	Category	Work	Result
2003	Best Finnish Artist	_	Won
2003	Export-Emma	_	Won
2003	Best Hardrock/Metal-album	Century Child	Nominated
2005	Best Finnish Artist	_	Won
2005	Export-Emma	_	Won
2005	Best Hardrock/Metal-album	Once	Won
2005	Best Selling Album	Once	Won
2005	Band of the Year	_	Won
2008	Best Metal Album	Dark Passion Play	Won
2008	Best Album	Dark Passion Play	Won
2008	Best Selling Album	Dark Passion Play	Won
2008	Best Finnish Artist	_	Won
2008	Song of the year	"Amaranth"	Nominated
2013	Best Album	Imaginaerum	Won
2013	Band of the Year	_	Won
2016	Band of the Year	_	Nominated
2016	Album of the Year	Endless Forms Most Beautiful	Nominated
2016	Metal Album of the Year	Endless Forms Most Beautiful	Won
2016	Export-Emma	_	Won
2021	Album of the Year	Human. :II: Nature.	Nominated
2021	Band of the Year	_	Nominated
2021	Metal Album of the Year	Human. :II: Nature.	Won
2021	Viewer's Choice of the Year	_	Nominated
2025	Band of the Year	_	Nominated
2025	Metal Album of the Year	Yesterwynde	Nominated

=== The Mighty Metal Music Awards ===
"The Mighty Metal Music Awards" is a Finnish Heavy metal award from Helsinki:

Year	Category	Work	Result
1998	"Best newcomer"	_	Won

=== Muuvi Awards ===
The "Muuvi Awards" is an annual Video awards from Helsinki:

Year	Category	Work	Result
2005	Best music video	"Sleeping Sun"	Won
2009	Best music video	"The Islander"	Won

== MTV Awards ==
=== MTV Europe Music Awards ===
The MTV Europe Music Awards (EMA) were established in 1994 by MTV Networks Europe to celebrate the most popular music videos in Europe. Originally beginning as an alternative to the American MTV Video Music Awards, the MTV Europe Music Awards is today a popular celebration of what MTV viewers consider the best in music.

Unlike the VMAs, most of the awards are voted for by the viewers.

Year	Category	Work	Result
2008	Best Finnish Act	_	Won

== Other awards ==
=== Kerrang! Awards ===
The Kerrang! Awards is an annual awards ceremony held by Kerrang!, a British rock magazine. Nightwish has received one nomination.

Year	Nominee / work	Award	Result
2005	"Nemo"	Best Single	Nominated

=== Metal Storm Awards ===
Metal Storm hosts an annual award, where they appoint the album of the year for the different genres of metal. The official 10 nominees of each category are decided by the staff members and receives a brief description and if available a link to an official MetalStorm review. In additions to the official nominees, the users have the opportunity to supply "write-in" votes for bands not officially nominated.

Year	Category	Work	Result
2004	Best Cover Song	"Symphony of Destruction"	Won
2004	Best Power Metal Album	Once	Won
2004	Best Video	"Nemo"	Won
2007	Best Metal Album	Dark Passion Play	Nominated
2007	Best music video	Amaranth	Nominated
2007	Surprise of the Year	Dark Passion Play	Won

=== Gold Awards ===
The "Gold Awards" is a New Zealand award, since 1999:

Year	Category	Work	Result
2008	Album of the Year	"Dark Passion Play"	Won

=== World Music Awards ===
The "World Music Awards" is an international awards show founded in 1989 that annually honors recording artists based on worldwide sales figures provided by the International Federation of the Phonographic Industry (IFPI).

Year	Category	Work	Result
2008	Best-Selling Artist - Scandinavia	_	Won

=== Metal Hammer Golden Gods Awards ===
Year	Category	Work	Result
2005	Best International Band	_	Nominated
2005	Best Newcomer	_	Nominated

=== Echo Awards ===
Year	Category	Work	Result
2001	Best Newcomer	_	Nominated
2001	Best International Rock/Alternative	_	Won
