= Showtime, Storytime =

Video by Nightwish
- Released: 29 November 2013/10 December 2013 (United States)
- Recorded: 3 August 2013
- Venue: Wacken Open Air (Wacken, Germany)
- Length: 95:46
- Label: Nuclear Blast

Nightwish live album chronology
Made in Hong Kong (And in Various Other Places) (2009)	Showtime, Storytime (2013)	Vehicle of Spirit (2016)

Professional ratings
Review scores
Source	Rating
About.com	4/5 stars

Showtime, Storytime is a video release, released as a double Blu-ray, DVD, CD and LP from the Finnish symphonic metal band Nightwish. Nuclear Blast recorded their live performance at Wacken Open Air in Wacken, Germany on 3 August 2013. Showtime, Storytime is the first Nightwish production to feature Floor Jansen on vocals. She initially replaced previous vocalist Anette Olzon during their North America tour leg, and on 9 October 2013 it was revealed that she would become an official band member, along with Troy Donockley. The running time of the concert is 1 hour and 38 minutes. The album also contains a 120-minute documentary about the first days of Jansen in the band, still as an only live member, and her process of adaptation in the band, called "Please Learn the Setlist in 48 Hours".

== Track listing ==
=== Video disc 1 ===
All lyrics are written by Tuomas Holopainen; all music is composed by Holopainen, except where noted.

No.	Title	Starts at	Length
1.	"Dark Chest of Wonders"	0:00:00	4:33
2.	"Wish I Had an Angel"	0:04:33	4:49
3.	"She Is My Sin"	0:09:22	4:55
4.	"Ghost River"	0:14:17	6:05
5.	"Ever Dream"	0:20:22	5:21
6.	"Storytime"	0:25:43	5:38
7.	"I Want My Tears Back"	0:33:40	6:44
8.	"Nemo"	0:40:24	4:45
9.	"Last of the Wilds"	0:45:09	6:32
10.	"Bless the Child"	0:51:41	7:06
11.	"Romanticide" (music: Holopainen, Marko Hietala)	0:58:47	5:40
12.	"Amaranth"	1:04:27	4:26
13.	"Ghost Love Score"	1:08:53	10:31
14.	"Song of Myself"	1:19:24	7:53
15.	"Last Ride of the Day"	1:27:17	4:34
16.	"Outro: Imaginaerum" (music: Holopainen, Pip Williams)	1:31:51	6:16

Bonus track

No.	Title	Length
17.	"I Want My Tears Back" (Live from Helsinki)	5:27
18.	"Ghost Love Score" (Live from Buenos Aires)	11:00

=== Video disc 2 ===
No.	Title	Length
1.	"Please Learn the Setlist in 48 Hours (Documentary)"	2:00:11
2.	"Nightwish Table Hockey Tournament (Bonus)"	16:33
3.	"Christmas Song for a Lonely Documentarist (Bonus)"	3:39

== Members ==
- Floor Jansen – vocals
- Tuomas Holopainen – keyboards
- Emppu Vuorinen – guitars
- Marko Hietala – bass guitar, clean male vocals (on tracks 2, 4, 5, 7, 11, 12, 14 & 15)
- Jukka Nevalainen – drums
- Troy Donockley – Uilleann pipes, flutes, additional vocals

== Charts performance ==
DVDs Chart (2013)	Peak position
Belgian Music DVD Chart (Flanders)	15
Belgian Music DVD Chart (Wallonia)	6
Dutch Music DVD Chart	14
Finnish Music DVD Chart	1
French Music DVD Chart	2
German Music DVD Chart	1
Japanese DVD Chart	131
Swedish Music DVD Chart	2

Albums Chart (2013)	Peak position
Belgian Albums Chart (Flanders)	184
Belgian Albums Chart (Wallonia)	158
Finnish Albums Chart	40
German Albums Chart	6
Korean Albums Chart	49
Swiss Albums Chart	52
UK Albums Chart	126
UK Indie Albums Chart	13
UK Rock Albums Chart	5
US Hard Rock Albums Chart	13
