= Made in Hong Kong (And in Various Other Places) =

Live album by Nightwish
- Released: 11 March 2009; 31 March 2009 (US)
- Recorded: 2006–2008
- Length: 66:08 (CD)
- Label: Spinefarm Records; Roadrunner Records; Nuclear Blast

Nightwish live album chronology
End of an Era (2006)	Made in Hong Kong (And in Various Other Places) (2009)	Showtime, Storytime (2013)

Professional ratings
Review scores
Source	Rating
AllMusic	3.5/5 stars
Lords of Metal	(8.6/10)
The Metal Circus	7.5/10 stars
Metal Symphony	3.5/5 stars
Metal Hammer	5/10 stars

Made in Hong Kong (And in Various Other Places) is the title of a live / compilation CD/DVD by the Finnish symphonic metal band Nightwish, released on 11 March 2009.

The album contains a CD and a DVD – the CD consists of eight songs recorded live during their Dark Passion Play tour in 2008, two tracks previously released as b-sides, and a previously unreleased demo version of "Cadence of Her Last Breath", predating Anette Olzon's joining the band and thus sung by bassist Marko Hietala (as were all the demos from Dark Passion Play). The DVD contains three music videos as well as a documentary featuring material from Israel to South America, directed by Ville Lipiäinen.

== Background ==
When the information on the album was released, discussions outbroke in forums about the odd name compared to Nightwish's other album titles, which are generally more serious and deep. It was soon discovered, however, that keyboardist and band leader Tuomas Holopainen mentioned already in the Easter of 2004 that if they'd ever record a live EP in Hong Kong, it would be called "Made in Hong Kong".

The DVD contains Back in the Day... Is Now, a 40-minute-long mini-documentary chronicling the adventures of Nightwish during their Dark Passion Play tour from 2007 to 2008. The majority of the film is narrated by Holopainen, with chapters of the film divided by scenes of the band in their tour bus playing "Drunken Uno" - a game of Uno where the loser (who, more often than not, is bassist Marko Hietala) must consume a cup of Jägermeister.

Amongst the topics covered throughout the documentary is the incident during the band's show in Belo Horizonte, Brazil, on 10 November 2008. The film shows a YouTube video of lead vocalist Anette Olzon walking out during the band's performance of "The Poet and the Pendulum". Olzon explains that an improperly placed smoke machine interfered with her vocal cords.

== Reception ==
The actual track list was rumoured long before its release in February 2009, and the general reception was that many fans were disappointed it didn't include remakes or live version of pre-Era songs, or any new songs except the previously unreleased version of "Cadence of Her Last Breath".

Such remakes/live versions would have been "Dark Chest Of Wonders," "Nemo," and "Sacrament Of Wilderness". However, the release of the album coincides with the band beginning to play older songs that Anette has not performed before on stage, such as 'Dead Boy's Poem', 'Romanticide', and 'Ghost Love Score', effectively ending the portion of the tour in which songs from Dark Passion Play dominate the set.

== Track listing ==
=== MCD ===
All lyrics are written by Tuomas Holopainen; all music is composed by Holopainen, except where noted.

No.	Title	Length
1.	"Bye Bye Beautiful" (live)	4:34
2.	"Whoever Brings the Night" (live; music: Emppu Vuorinen)	4:24
3.	"Amaranth" (live)	4:17
4.	"The Poet and the Pendulum" (live)	13:59
5.	"Sahara" (live)	6:10
6.	"The Islander" (live; feat. Troy Donockley; music: Marko Hietala)	5:25
7.	"Last of the Wilds" (live; feat. Troy Donockley)	6:31
8.	"7 Days to the Wolves" (live; music: Holopainen, Hietala)	7:17
9.	"Escapist" (B-side from "Bye Bye Beautiful" single)	4:59
10.	"While Your Lips Are Still Red" (B-side from "Amaranth" single; music: Holopainen, Hietala)	4:18
11.	"Cadence of Her Last Breath" (Demo)	4:14

=== DVD ===
1. Bye Bye Beautiful (promotional video)
2. Amaranth (promotional video)
3. The Islander (promotional video)
4. Back in the Day... Is Now

== Credits ==
- Anette Olzon – lead vocals
- Tuomas Holopainen – Keyboards
- Emppu Vuorinen – Lead guitar, Classic guitar
- Jukka Nevalainen – Drums
- Marko Hietala – Bass guitar, Classic guitar and male vocals
- Troy Donockley – Uilleann pipes (on tracks 6 and 7)

== Charts ==
Chart (2009)	Peak position
Finland	2
Greece	4
United Kingdom	10
Germany	15
Netherlands	20
Austria	26
Belgium	50
Sweden	54
Italy	89
Japan	182
