= Storytime (song) =

Single by Nightwish

from the album Imaginaerum
- Released: November 9, 2011
- Genre: Symphonic metal
- Length: 3:59 (radio edit); 5:22 (album version)
- Label: Scene Nation
- Songwriter: Tuomas Holopainen
- Producer: Tuomas Holopainen

Nightwish singles chronology
| "The Islander" (2008) | "Storytime" (2011) | "The Crow, the Owl and the Dove" (2012) |

"Storytime" is the lead single from the Finnish symphonic metal band Nightwish's seventh studio album, Imaginaerum. It was released on November 9, 2011, twenty days prior to the album, along with a music video. The song premiered on Radio Rock, a Finnish radio station at 9.00 GMT +2 on November 7, 2011, two days before its commercial release.

Composer and band leader Tuomas Holopainen has said of "Storytime" that it "is a single that pretty well represents the whole album", and that it gives a better picture of the album than "Eva" and "Amaranth" did as the first two singles from the 2007 album Dark Passion Play.

== Background ==
The song was revealed as the first single and music video on September 2, 2011, with the release date set to November 11. A week later, the band released the Imaginaerum cover, track list and commentary on each song written by Holopainen, including the first clues concerning the song, hinting on references to yuletide and The Snowman. On October 26, the first content from the song and video was released in a 50-second teaser video on YouTube.

The single was released as a CD, download and as a video through YouTube on November 9, and the day after, Holopainen featured in a YouTube video talking about the video and the background of the song. After a mere week, the band announced that the single was topping the Finnish single chart. On November 18, the lyrics to the song were released in a YouTube video and on the band's website.

== Musical and lyrical content ==
Composer and lyricist of the song, Tuomas Holopainen has said that "Storytime" is inspired by the 1982 movie The Snowman, the theme of which was previously covered by Nightwish for their Oceanborn album. The idea for the music of "Storytime" was born when Holopainen wondered why no-one had made a remake of the film, and pondered on what his version of the score to the scene in which "Walking in the Air" plays would sound like.

In a teaser text released prior to the release, Holopainen summarized the song:

"How would it feel to take a midnight flight with a snowman through the most wondrous landscapes, like in the classic animated Yuletide film? The meaning of our very existence is created though stories, tales and imagination. They are at the very core of humanity."

The lyrics references several classical pieces of fiction concerning imagination, including the character of Peter Pan and Alice's Adventures in Wonderland by Lewis Carroll. The lyrics also mention the mythical Gaia, the Greek primordial Earth goddess.

== Music video ==
The music video to "Storytime" features the radio version of the song, which is one and a half minute shorter than the album version. The video shows the band playing the song in the suits they wear in the Imaginaerum film, and with characters from the film briefly shown throughout the video. The video cuts between this movie-like scene and footage of the band dressing up, and behind-the-scene footage from the making of the film.

After having done "a few grand fantasy videos" like "Amaranth" and "The Islander", the production team wanted a more down-to-earth video, a making-of clip, which would be "pretty interesting to watch for the fans, even a couple of times."

== Packaging ==
"Storytime" was released simultaneously as a CD, as a download and as a YouTube video. The cover art was done by Janne "Toxic Angel" Pitkänen, who had previously done the cover art to both Dark Passion Play (2007) and Imaginaerum, as well as all single covers since "Eva". The cover features a book with the emblem from the song "The Crow, the Owl and the Dove" and the text "Storytime" on the side. The book stand beside the roller coaster seen on the Imaginaerum cover, and the background has a winter theme to reflect the lyrical content. It is the first single since "Sleeping Sun" to feature the title of the song in another font than Nightwish's traditional.

== Track listing ==
The track listing was revealed on the website of Nightwish's official fanshop on September 2, as the pre-sales began.

All tracks are written by Tuomas Holopainen.

Storytime CDS (Digipak)
| No. | Title | Length |
|---|---|---|
| 1. | "Storytime" (radio edit) | 3:59 |
| 2. | "Storytime" (album version) | 5:28 |
| 3. | "Storytime" (instrumental version) | 5:28 |

Storytime 10" Mini-LP - Side A
| No. | Title | Length |
|---|---|---|
| 1. | "Storytime" (album version) | 5:28 |

Storytime 10" Mini-LP - Side B
| No. | Title | Length |
|---|---|---|
| 2. | "Storytime" (radio edit) | 3:59 |
| 3. | "Storytime" (instrumental version) | 5:28 |

Storytime (live at Wacken 2013) (digital single)
| No. | Title | Length |
|---|---|---|
| 1. | "Storytime" (edit; live @ Wacken 2013) | 5:34 |

== Charts ==
| Chart (2011) | Peak position |
|---|---|
| Austrian Top 40 Singles | 57 |
| Finnish Singles Chart | 1 |
| French Physical Singles | 19 |
| German Singles Chart | 39 |
| Hungarian Singles Chart | 2 |
| Spanish Physical Singles | 2 |
| Swiss Top 100 Singles | 31 |
| UK Rock Chart | 5 |
