= Conspiracy (Michael Bormann album) =

Studio album by Michael Bormann
- Released: 29 September 2006
- Recorded: April – May 2006
- Genre: Hard rock
- Length: 62:47
- Label: RMB
- Producer: Michael Bormann

Michael Bormann chronology
Michael Bormann (2002)	Conspiracy (2006)	Capture the Moment (2008)

Conspiracy is the second album by the German singer Michael Bormann. Many of the songs that appear on this recording were meant for Jaded Heart's eighth album, but once Bormann was fired from the band the demoed songs were slightly redone and used on Conspiracy.

The album and songs from it were nominated twelve times in the 50th Grammy Awards, but did not manage to make the final five for their categories. The nominations were:

Best Solo Rock Vocal Performance: "Amazing", "Conspiracy", "One Man One Soul", "Reaching Out", "Stand Up"
Best Rock Song: "Amazing", "Conspiracy"
Best Rock Album: Conspiracy by Michael Bormann
Song Of The Year: "Reaching Out", "Stand Up"
Album Of The Year: Conspiracy by Michael Bormann
Best Pop Collaboration With Vocals: "Two of a Kind" (duet by Michael Bormann and Anette Blyckert)

== Track listing ==
1. "Conspiracy"
2. "It's Only Physical"
3. "Stand Up"
4. "Two Of A Kind" (duet with Anette Blyckert)
5. "No Regrets"
6. "Devil's Son"
7. "Ain't Just A Bit"
8. "Living Just A Lie"
9. "Reaching Out"
10. "One Man One Soul"
11. "So This Could Be You"
12. "Amazing"
13. "Samirangel"
