= While Your Lips Are Still Red =

Song by Tuomas Holopainen and Marko Hietala
- Released: 22 August 2007
- Recorded: 2006–2007
- Genre: Symphonic rock
- Length: 4:19
- Label: Spinefarm
- Songwriters: Tuomas Holopainen; Marko Hietala

Music video
- "While Your Lips Are Still Red" on YouTube

"While Your Lips Are Still Red" is a 2007 song written by Tuomas Holopainen and Marko Hietala of the Finnish symphonic metal band Nightwish. It was performed by Holopainen, Hietala, and Jukka Nevalainen for the Finnish film The Matriarch, which was written and directed by renowned Finnish director Markku Pölönen; the film premiered in Finland in September 2007. The song is included on Nightwish's "Amaranth" single, which was released on 22 August 2007 as the second single of their sixth studio album, Dark Passion Play. It was also released on their live / compilation EP Made in Hong Kong (And in Various Other Places) in 2009.

"While Your Lips Are Still Red" is not an official Nightwish track, but Holopainen has stated that he is not comfortable with releasing any material under his own name. The Nightwish website clearly states that the song was written by Tuomas Holopainen and features him on keyboards, Marko Hietala on vocals and Jukka Nevalainen on drums. The song does not include guitars or female vocals. The videoclip accredits the song to Holopainen and Hietala, leaving out Nevalainen, who was not involved in the songwriting. The whispering in the background is done by Tuomas Holopainen.

The song has been played on concerts in various occasions, while guitarist Emppu Vuorinen and former vocalist Anette Olzon were backstage. More recent performances have also featured Floor Jansen with additional vocals, and Troy Donockley with a guitar solo played with an EBow in place of the prominent violin sound from the studio version. These include a performance at London's Wembley Arena in 2015 that was released on the band's 2016 live album Vehicle of Spirit.

== Music video ==
The official music video of the song contains clips from the film Lieksa!, Hietala singing, and Holopainen walking behind him. The video was released on YouTube on 14 June 2007. On 26 March 2015 it was reuploaded, and has over 65 million views.

== Personnel ==
- Marko Hietala – composition, lead vocals, acoustic bass guitar
- Tuomas Holopainen – composition, lyrics, keyboards, backing vocals
- Jukka Nevalainen – drums, percussion

== Reviews and commentaries ==
- 'While Your Lips Are Still Red – Nightwish' Song Review on Stray Poetry
