= Bye Bye Beautiful =

Single by Nightwish

from the album Dark Passion Play
- B-side: "The Poet and the Pendulum" (demo); "Escapist"
- Released: 15 February 2008
- Genre: Industrial metal; symphonic metal
- Length: 4:14
- Label: Spinefarm
- Songwriter: Tuomas Holopainen
- Producer: Tuomas Holopainen

Nightwish singles chronology
"Erämaan viimeinen" (2007)	"Bye Bye Beautiful" (2008)	"The Islander" (2008)

Music video
- "Bye Bye Beautiful" on YouTube

"Bye Bye Beautiful" is the second track on the Finnish symphonic metal band Nightwish's studio album, Dark Passion Play. The song was confirmed to be the second single from Dark Passion Play by Tuomas Holopainen in an interview, but it was changed to the third single after the announcement of "Erämaan viimeinen"'s release as the second.

A promo version of the track was leaked to the Internet on 11 July 2007. The full single was released on 15 February 2008 in three versions, CD, DVD and 12 inch. It includes a remix of the song by DJ Orkidea as well as a demo version of "The Poet and the Pendulum" and Dark Passion Play's Japanese bonus track "Escapist".

In the first part of the Dark Passion Play World Tour, "Bye Bye Beautiful" was the standard opening track, which was played after an intro of "Resurrection" from the soundtrack of The Passion of the Christ. In 2009 it was replaced by "7 Days to the Wolves" and Holopainen stated that the band is never going to play "Bye Bye Beautiful" live again.

== Content ==
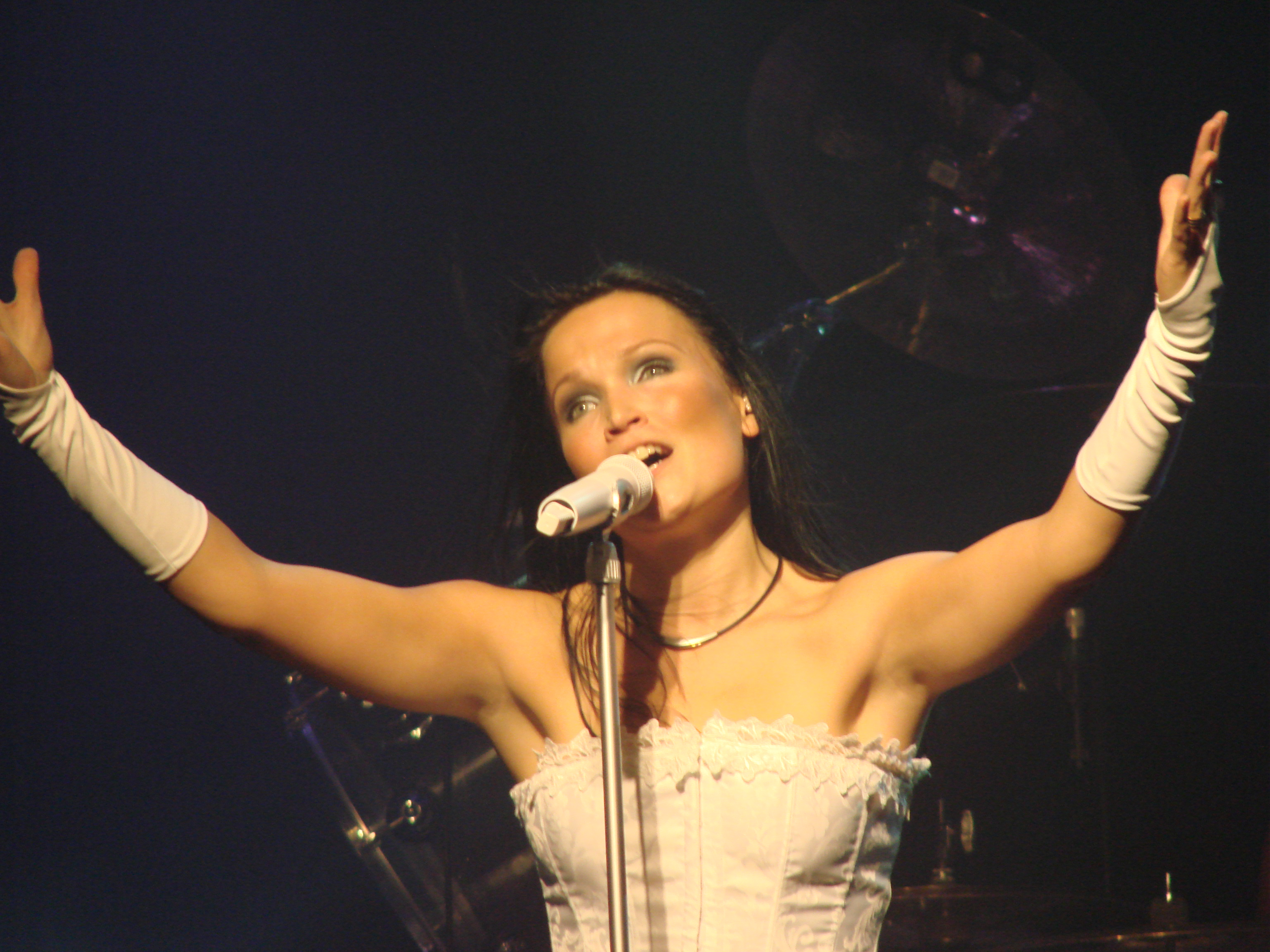
Nightwish's ex-frontwoman, Tarja Turunen

The vocals are shared between the band’s two vocalists, Anette Olzon and Marko Hietala. He performs the chorus and the bridge. In the studio version of the chorus he sings "Did you ever let in what the world said" and "Did we play to become only pawns in the game?", but in live sessions he sings "Oh, let in what the world said" and "Did we play - only pawns in the game?" respectively, adding pauses, probably for breathing in.

"Bye Bye Beautiful" is written by Tuomas Holopainen about the band's former vocalist, Tarja Turunen, who was dismissed from the band with an open letter in October 2005, and his feelings before and after the time she supposedly changed her attitude towards the band and its music. This was at first rumoured among fans and later revealed by Holopainen in an interview. The chorus also contains the lyrics “Did you ever read what I wrote you?/ Did you ever listen to what we played?” in which the is a reference to the lyrics written by Holopainen.

== Music video ==
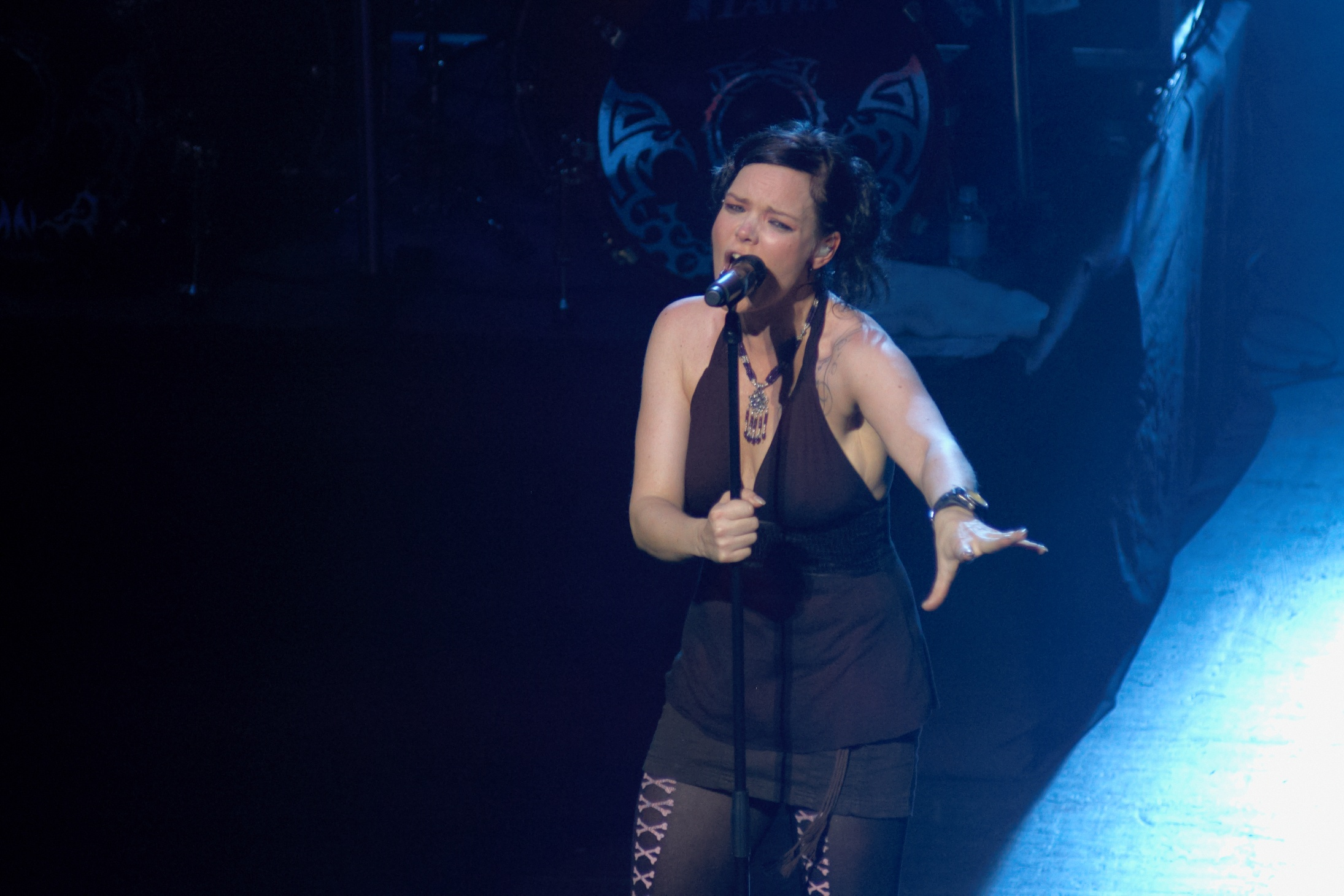
Anette Olzon, who replaced Turunen as a frontwoman of Nightwish, and who performed "Bye Bye Beautiful"

In the video for "Bye Bye Beautiful", the four male members of the band are replaced by four female models throughout the verses. Despite speculation, Holopainen said in a Finnish interview that the female doubles in this video have nothing to do with the removal of Tarja Turunen from Nightwish, saying "It's just pure self-irony and rock 'n' roll". The four models are referring to the rumor going around the fans that Anette Olzon, the new singer, was chosen to attract more fans because of her looks. In the video, they make fun of the rumor. The video was released on September 27, 2007.

According to the "'Making of 'Bye Bye Beautiful" documentary, the models are from an agency in Los Angeles:

- Kyra Hultz - keyboards (Tuomas Holopainen double)
- Ines Brigman - guitar (Emppu Vuorinen double)
- Alicia Sixtos - drums (Jukka Nevalainen double)
- Leslie Crow - bass (Marko Hietala double)

Antti Jokinen was the director and John Thorpe was the producer.

== Track listing ==
Standard Edition (CD version)
No.	Title	Writer(s)	Length
1.	"Bye Bye Beautiful"	Tuomas Holopainen	4:19
2.	"The Poet and the Pendulum" (original demo version)	Holopainen	13:43
3.	"Escapist"	Holopainen	5:01
4.	"Bye Bye Beautiful" (DJ Orkidea Remix)	Holopainen	12:07

Standard Edition (DVD version)
No.	Title	Writer(s)	Length
1.	"Bye Bye Beautiful" (Music Video on 5.1 sound)		4:14
2.	"Bye Bye Beautiful" (Music Video on 2.0 sound)		4:14
3.	"Bye Bye Beautiful" (Making of)		16:11
4.	"Amaranth" (Music Video on 5.1 sound)		3:57
5.	"Amaranth" (Music Video on 2.0 sound)		3:57
6.	"While Your Lips Are Still Red" (official music video)		4:18
7.	"Bye Bye Beautiful"	Holopainen	4:14
8.	"The Poet and the Pendulum" (original demo version)	Holopainen	13:41
9.	"Escapist"	Holopainen	5:01
10.	"Bye Bye Beautiful" (DJ Orkidea Remix)	Holopainen	12:07

== Charts performance ==
In the UK, "Bye Bye Beautiful" entered the UK Rock Singles Chart at number two, behind Nickelback's "Rockstar". After the European release, "Bye Bye Beautiful" reached its highest position in a national singles chart, in Spain, reaching number 4, slightly lower than Nightwish's Spanish number 1 hit "Amaranth". The single also charted in France and Germany.

Chart (2007–2009)	Peak position
Eurochart Hot 100 Singles	49
Finnish Singles Chart	5
French Singles Chart	54
German Singles Chart	35
Hungarian Singles Chart	4
Italian Singles Chart	48
Spanish Top 50 Singles	4
UK Indie Chart	6
UK Rock Chart	2

== Personnel ==
- Anette Olzon – Female vocals
- Marko Hietala – Bass and male vocals
- Tuomas Holopainen – Keyboards
- Emppu Vuorinen – Guitars
- Jukka Nevalainen – Drums
- DJ Orkidea - Remixer (On track 4)
- London Philharmonic Orchestra - Orchestral parts
