= The Islander (song) =

Single by Nightwish

from the album Dark Passion Play
- B-side: "Escapist" (instrumental version); "Meadows of Heaven" (orchestral version)
- Released: 21 May 2008
- Genre: contemporary folk music
- Length: 3:55 (radio edit); 5:05 (album version)
- Label: Spinefarm
- Composer: Marko Hietala
- Lyricist: Tuomas Holopainen
- Producer: Tuomas Holopainen

Nightwish singles chronology
| "Bye Bye Beautiful" (2008) | "The Islander" (2008) | "Storytime" (2011) |

Music video
- "The Islander" on YouTube

"The Islander" is the tenth track on the Finnish symphonic metal band Nightwish's studio album, Dark Passion Play. It was confirmed to be the album's fourth single on the website Nightwish-World on 23 February 2008, only a week after the third single, "Bye Bye Beautiful", was released. It was released on 21 May 2008, a month after the video which premiered on 14 April.

As with some of Nightwish' other songs (including for example "Creek Mary's Blood" from Once), the song fits into the genre contemporary folk music, rather than the symphonic metal they usually play, and uses only acoustic guitars, rather than electric. Marko Hietala provides the main vocals, with backing vocals from Anette Olzon. Hietala also wrote the music for the song. The song features future band member Troy Donockley as a guest musician.

The single features an instrumental version of "Bye Bye Beautiful" B-side "Escapist", as well as an orchestral version of "Meadows of Heaven". It also features the videos to "The Islander" and "Bye Bye Beautiful".

== Music video ==
The music video was filmed in Rovaniemi, in Finnish Lapland, in October 2007, and Holopainen commented that they at first didn't plan to make a third video for the album, but when they were offered Finnish beauty, they couldn't resist it. He has also said that for once the lyrics actually fits with the video, which is "a sort of Lapp wilderness combined with the surrealism of Salvador Dalí." The video features guest musician Troy Donockley, who would later become an official member of Nightwish.

The video was directed by Stobe Harju and produced by Ilkka Immonen of Lapland Studio Oy. It has a steampunk theme with airships, and features the old sailor (the "Islander" of the title) walking along a beach through the fog dragging a boat behind him and haunted by ghosts of his past. Later we see him in a flashback as a young man playing the uilleann pipes (portrayed by Troy Donockley) with trees blossoming after he ends his life by dropping anchor and being relieved of his burdens.

== Live performances ==
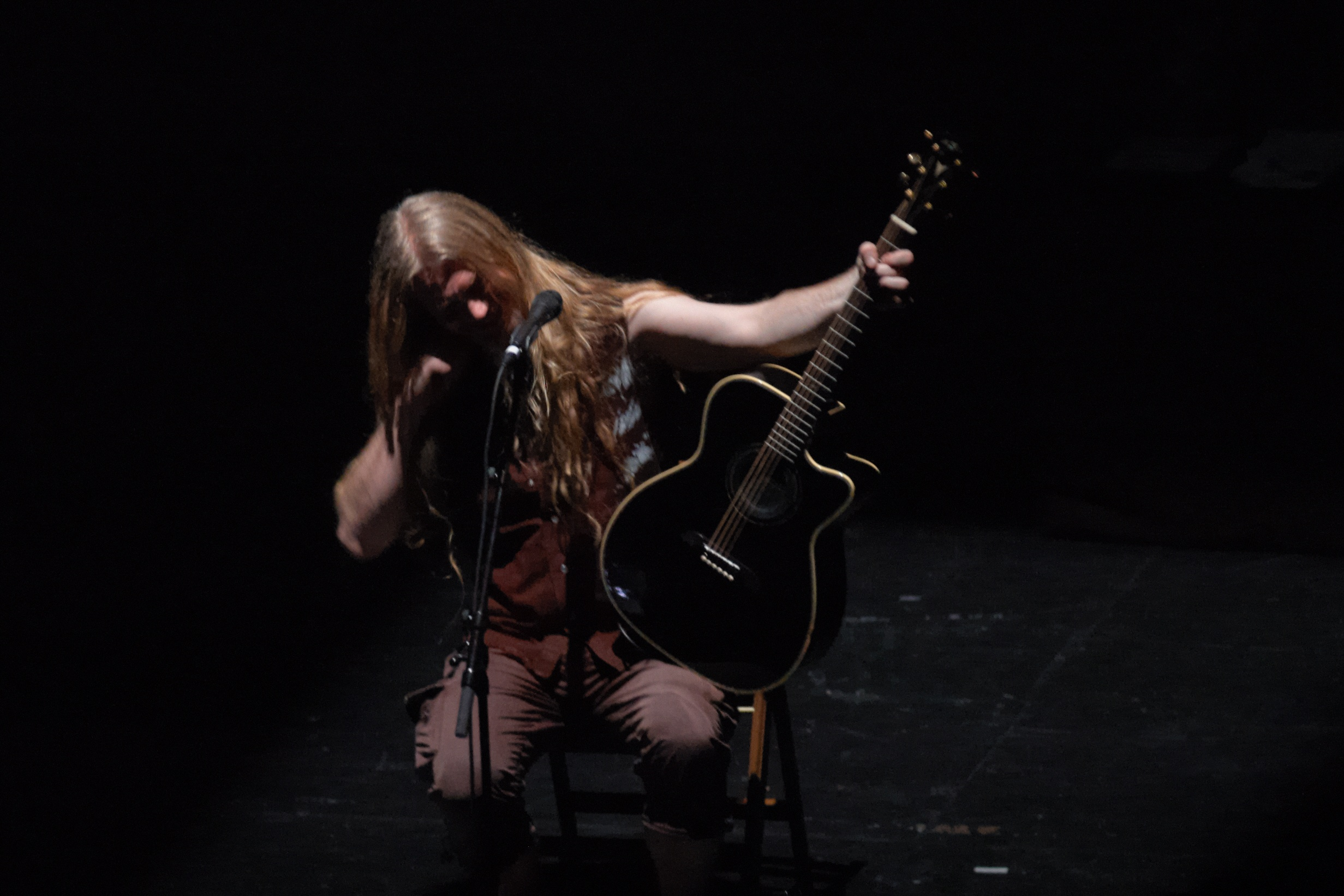
Marko Hietala playing "The Islander" in Melbourne, Australia, on 31 January 2008

"The Islander" quickly became a frequently performed song throughout the Dark Passion Play World Tour. An obvious change in the mood both on stage and in the audience is to be seen as darkness and silence suddenly embrace the stage, which is lightened up by a few outdoor torches. A spotlight shines on Hietala and Vuorinen, who sit on two chairs with acoustic guitars, and start to play the song.

Nevalainen enjoyed a moment of rest, and Holopainen added some piano-playing with his keyboards, but Olzon could not be seen. Olzon eventually showed up and turned the song into a duet towards the end. She was most often seen wearing a tiara during the song, to fit with the line "Princess in the tower.." At the end of the song, Holopainen usually also played a bit of '"The Heart Asks Pleasure First", the main theme by Michael Nyman from the movie The Piano, a piece of music the band covered but didn't get the permission to release from Nyman.

Holopainen has said that the song is one of the major moments of their concerts, as it is so different from the rest, making it all a very special, emotional moment. At the UK and Ireland dates on the Dark Passion Play tour, the band were often joined by Troy Donockley for this song as well as "Last of the Wilds", with the exception of the Glasgow date. In the 2009 leg of the tour Troy played with the band during all the European tour.

== Track listing ==
Standard Edition (CD version)
| No. | Title | Writer(s) | Length |
|---|---|---|---|
| 1. | "The Islander" (radio version) | Tuomas Holopainen, Marko Hietala | 3:57 |
| 2. | "The Islander" (full-length version) | Holopainen, Hietala | 4:58 |
| 3. | "Escapist" (instrumental version) | Holopainen | 4:57 |
| 4. | "Meadows of Heaven" (orchestral version) | Holopainen | 7:10 |

Standard Edition (DVD version)
| No. | Title | Length |
|---|---|---|
| 1. | "The Islander" (Music Video on stereo sound) |
| 2. | "The Islander" (Music Video on 5.1 sound) |
| 3. | "The Islander" (edited video) |
| 4. | "Bye Bye Beautiful" (Music Video on stereo sound) |
| 5. | "The Islander" (Making Of documentary) |
| 6. | "Escapist" (stereo audio) |
| 7. | "Escapist" (5.1 audio) |

== Personnel ==
Performed by:

- Marko Hietala - male vocals, acoustic guitars
- Emppu Vuorinen - acoustic guitars
- Tuomas Holopainen - keyboards
- Anette Olzon - female vocals
- Jukka Nevalainen - percussions
- Troy Donockley - bodhran, Uilleann pipes, tin whistle
- London Philharmonic Orchestra - orchestral parts

== Chart performance ==
"The Islander" went straight to #1 in Finland on the first day of its release. Recently, Nightwish have had major success in Spain and "The Islander" reached #5 in the Spanish Singles Chart, continuing a run of Top 5 singles from Dark Passion Play.

| Chart (2007–2009) | Peak position |
|---|---|
| Finnish Singles Chart | 1 |
| French Singles Chart | 91 |
| Spanish Singles Chart | 5 |

== Personnel ==
- Marko Hietala – Male vocals, Acoustic guitars
- Emppu Vuorinen - Acoustic guitars
- Tuomas Holopainen – Keyboards
- Anette Olzon – Female vocals
- Jukka Nevalainen – Percussions
- Troy Donockley - Bodhran, Uilleann Pipes, Tin Whistle
- London Philharmonic Orchestra - Orchestral parts
