= Eva (Nightwish song) =

Promotional single by Nightwish

from the album Dark Passion Play
- Released: 25 May 2007
- Genre: Symphonic metal
- Length: 4:24
- Label: Spinefarm
- Songwriter: Tuomas Holopainen
- Producer: Tuomas Holopainen

Nightwish promotional singles chronology
"Sleepwalker" (2000)	"Eva" (2007)	"Amaranth (live)" (2009)

"Eva" is the fourth promotional single by the Finnish symphonic metal band Nightwish. Lifted from their sixth studio album Dark Passion Play, this was the first release to feature Anette Olzon, following Tarja Turunen's departure in 2005.

Initially the single was only released on the Internet and radio, with a release date of 30 May 2007, together with the revealing of the identity of the new vocalist (Anette Olzon), but due to a leak on 23 May, the vocalist's identity was revealed on 24 May, and the song was released on the 25th. Officially, "Eva" started to play on Finnish radio stations YleX and Radio Rock at 07:00 on 25 May, and was available as a download the same day.

All European income from this release were donated to charity (Child Charity Foundation), and the income from Finnish Internet sales were donated to two children's homes in Finland.

Eva's cover was announced on the official website on 17 May. It features a young girl dressed in 19th century Finnish clothing with a teddy bear in front of a house by night.

== Content ==
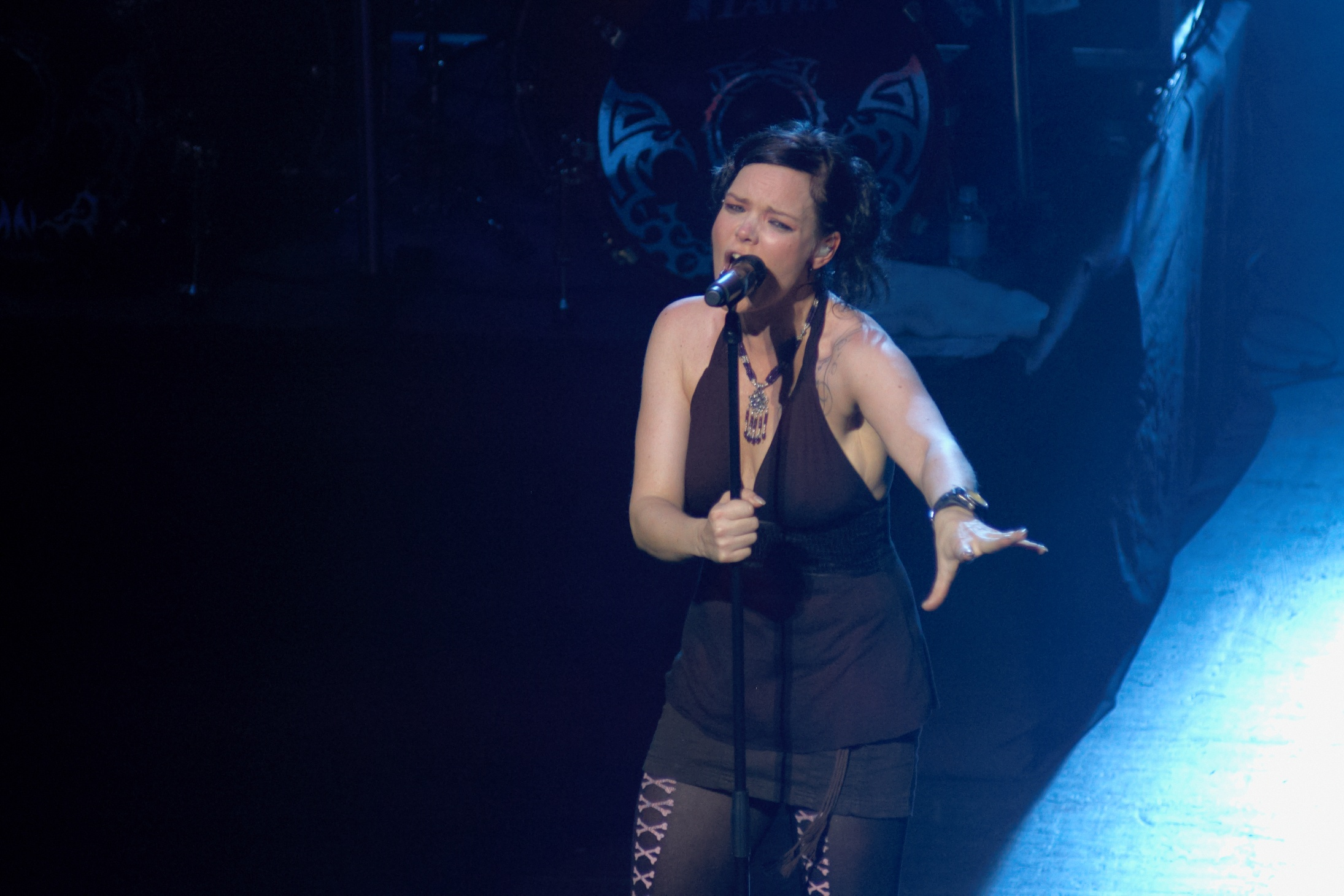
"Eva" was the first Nightwish single featuring Anette Olzon (pictured).

The song is about a young girl of pure innocence, called Eva, who has been treated wrongly in her life, and her escape from her home as she runs away alone for a better future, dreaming of what will come.

According to a diary entry posted to the official Nightwish website by the new vocalist on 13 May 2007, "Eva" is a soft, sad and emotional song. A sample of the track has been posted on the internet some days before the release with the following lyrics: "(...)She walks alone but not without her name. Eva flies away, dreams the world far away. In this cruel children's game, there's no friend to call her name (...)",

== Track list ==
Nuclearblast Musicshop
No.	Title	Writer(s)	Length
1.	"Eva"	Tuomas Holopainen	4:25

Official Promo Release
No.	Title	Writer(s)	Length
1.	"Eva" (standard version)	Holopainen	4:24

== Personnel ==
- Tuomas Holopainen - keyboards
- Emppu Vuorinen - lead guitar
- Jukka Nevalainen - drums
- Marko Hietala - bass, lead vocals (on demo)
- Anette Olzon - lead vocals
