= Amaranth (song) =

Single by Nightwish

from the album Dark Passion Play
- B-side: "Eva" (orchestral version); "While Your Lips Are Still Red"
- Released: 22 August 2007
- Genre: Symphonic metal
- Length: 3:53
- Label: Spinefarm
- Songwriter: Tuomas Holopainen
- Producer: Tuomas Holopainen

Nightwish singles chronology
"Sleeping Sun" (2005)	"Amaranth" (2007)	"Erämaan Viimeinen" (2007)

Music video
- "Amaranth" on YouTube

"Amaranth" is the thirteenth single by the Finnish symphonic metal band Nightwish. It was released as the first official single from their sixth studio album, Dark Passion Play, and was the second single overall to feature former frontwoman Anette Olzon, following the promotional single "Eva". The official release date was 22 August 2007 but it was leaked onto the Internet earlier, though the exact date it leaked is unknown.

The title song includes all of the band members, but the single contains a bonus track called "While Your Lips Are Still Red", on which Olzon and the guitarist Emppu Vuorinen do not play. This song is used in the Finnish film The Matriarch, released in September 2007. The official video for "Amaranth" was released on 15 June and has had over 100 million views.

On 24 August 2007 the Nightwish's official website reported that "Amaranth" had already achieved gold status in Finland two days after its release, meaning sales of over 5,000 copies. On 29 August it was announced that the single had topped the Finnish Singles Chart. On 6 September the official site also announced that Amaranth had reached the top of the charts in Hungary and Spain too.

== Reach ==
"Reach" was the original title for "Amaranth" when Nightwish began recording the demos for Dark Passion Play. After they had chosen a new female singer in February 2007, the lead vocal of the song was changed from Marko Hietala to Olzon and the lyrics of the chorus and parts of the music were changed, becoming "Amaranth". "Reach" was later included as the second track on the "Amaranth" CD single.

== Music video ==
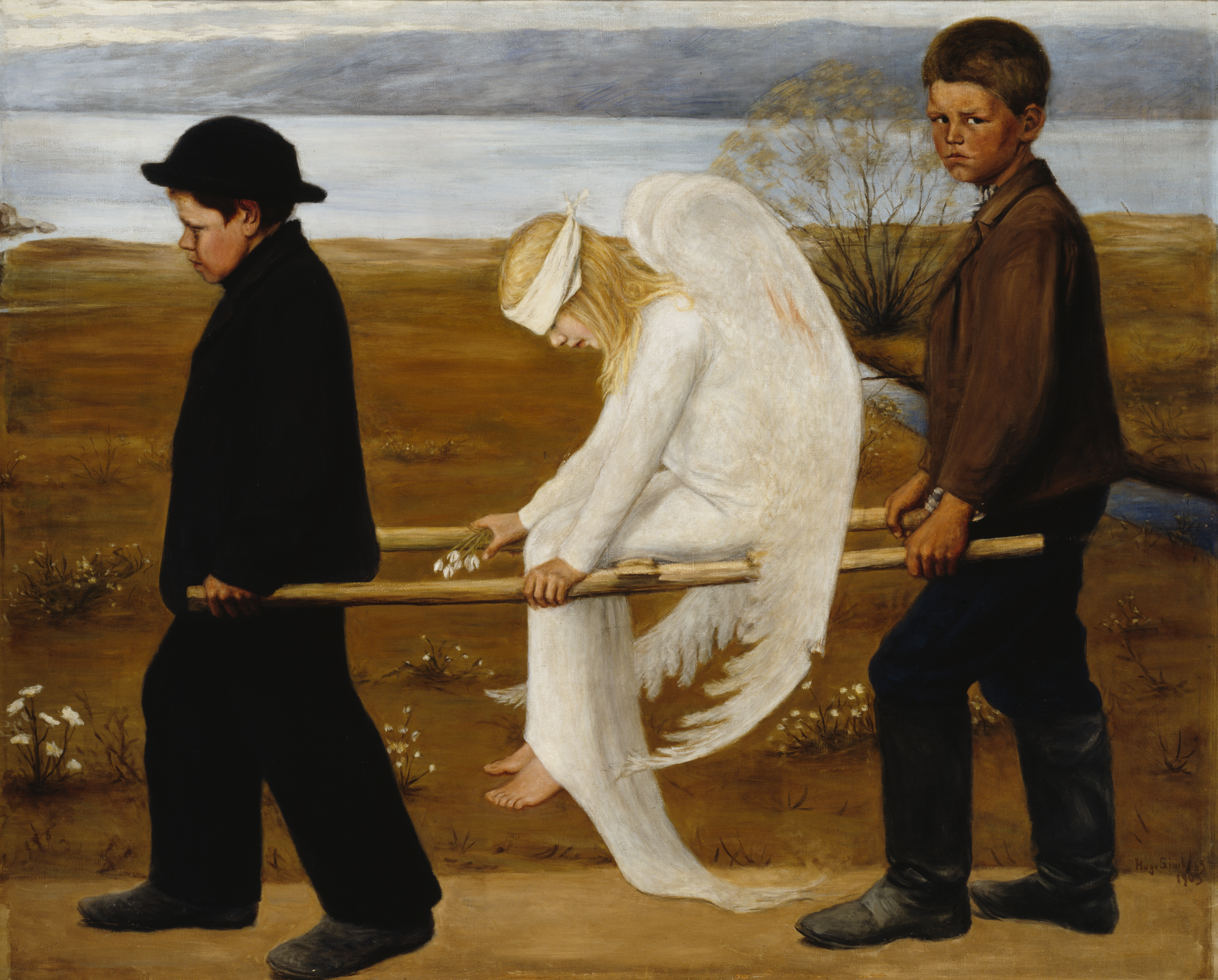
The Wounded Angel, by Hugo Simberg, inspired the story for "Amaranth" video.

The video for the song is the first from the Dark Passion Play album, succeeded by another, "Bye Bye Beautiful"; both were directed by Antti Jokinen and filmed in Los Angeles in spring 2007 and cost more than €270,000. In June 2007, Olzon said that the video, which was released with the single, is based on a Finnish painting called The Wounded Angel, which was painted at the turn of the 20th century by Hugo Simberg and voted the most loved painting of the Ateneum Art Museum in Helsinki in 2006.

The video alternates between the band playing underground and scenes of a story of two boys who find a fallen angel. It begins with the boys playing by a stream, having a good time, but when one of them looks up from his toy boat, he sees an angel lying on the other side, unconscious and bleeding from her eyes. The boy points out the angel to his brother, and they run to her aid. Subsequently, they are seen carrying the now blindfolded angel on a makeshift stretcher. They travel to a nearby village in order to treat her. Residents of the village are confused and some look upon her with contempt, possibly seeing her not as an angel, but as an object of evil. This may be a reference to Satan, who fell from Heaven during the great battle. Because of Lucifer's treachery, a fallen angel is often viewed as evil.

The boys reach their house and set the angel down on a bed. One of them touches the angel's wings, and she regains consciousness. The boy tilts her chin up, and a drop of blood falls from her eyes into his open hand, which closes. A mob of men, made up of some of the villagers who saw the boys bring in the angel, barge into the house and drag the boys out, away from the angel, who has begun to thrash helplessly. A man outside sets the house on fire with a torch. The mob outside rejoice as the house burns down, but the angel escapes back to Heaven.

== Track listing ==
The first version of the single was presented by Spinefarm Records on 22 August 2007. The track listing was revealed on the website of Nightwish's official fanshop on 21 June, as the pre-sales began.

Version 1
No.	Title	Writer(s)	Length
1.	"Amaranth"	Tuomas Holopainen	3:57
2.	"Reach" ("Amaranth" demo version, sung by Marko Hietala)	Holopainen	3:57
3.	"Eva" (Orchestral Version)	Holopainen	4:28
4.	"While Your Lips Are Still Red" (Sung by Hietala)	Holopainen & Hietala	4:22

Version 2
No.	Title	Writer(s)	Length
1.	"Amaranth"	Tuomas Holopainen	3:57
2.	"Amaranth" (Orchestral version)	Holopainen	3:51
3.	"Eva" (Demo version, sung by Marko Hietala)	Holopainen	4:18

== Charts performance ==
"Amaranth" is Nightwish's most successful single, reaching number 1 in Spain, Hungary and Finland. It went straight to number one in Finland and stayed there for three weeks, dropping to number 2 in its fourth week on the chart. "Amaranth" then returned to the top spot the following week and remained there for a further six weeks. In total it spent 21 weeks inside the Finnish Top 40. In the UK, it charted at #120 on the mainstream chart but topped the Rock Singles Chart for five weeks.

Chart (2008/09)	Peak position
Austrian Top 40 Singles	30
Australian Singles Chart	38
Danish Singles Chart	4
Dutch Singles Chart	47
Eurochart Hot 100 Singles	25
Finnish Singles Chart	1
French Singles Chart	62
German Singles Chart	15
Greek Singles Chart	4
Italian Singles Chart	10
Hungarian Singles Chart	1
Spanish Top 50 Singles	1
Swedish Singles Chart	13
Swiss Top 100 Singles	14
UK Indie Chart	5
UK Rock Chart	1
UK Singles Chart	120

=== Sales and certifications ===
Country	Certification (sales thresholds)
Finland	Platinum

== In popular culture ==
- "Amaranth" (alongside "Poison" by Alice Cooper) was sampled by the German dance-act Baracuda in the 2008 single "Where is the Love".
- The song was made available for download on 14 August 2012 to play in Rock Band 3 basic and pro mode utilizing real guitar and bass guitar, and MIDI compatible electronic drum kits and keyboards.
