= Dark Passion Play =

Studio album by Nightwish
- Released: 26 September 2007
- Recorded: September 2006 – March 2007
- Studios: Petrax (Hollola); E-Major (Kerava); Finnvox (Helsinki); Abbey Road (London)
- Genres: Symphonic metal; gothic metal
- Length: 75:36
- Label: Spinefarm
- Producer: Tuomas Holopainen

Nightwish studio album chronology
Once (2004)	Dark Passion Play (2007)	Imaginaerum (2011)

Singles from Dark Passion Play
- 1. "Amaranth" Released: 22 August 2007; 2. "Erämaan Viimeinen (Last of the Wilds)" Released: 5 December 2007 (Finland only); 3. "Bye Bye Beautiful" Released: 15 February 2008; 4. "The Islander" Released: 21 May 2008

Dark Passion Play is the sixth studio album by the Finnish symphonic metal band Nightwish. It was released on 26 September 2007 by Spinefarm Records in Finland, 28 September by Nuclear Blast in Europe and 2 October 2007 by Roadrunner Records in the US. It is the first album without original vocalist Tarja Turunen, who was dismissed in 2005, as well as the first album involving future member Troy Donockley on uilleann pipes and tin whistle. It is the first of only two albums with vocalist Anette Olzon, who was eventually dismissed in 2012 after the release of the band's subsequent album, Imaginaerum. Tuomas Holopainen has referred to this album as the "album that saved his life".

The song "Eva" was leaked on the Internet six days before its official release, prompting the band to release it earlier as a promotional single to boost downloads. Several other versions of the song were posted on YouTube and torrent sites a month later; the entire album with record label voice-overs had been leaked on the Internet by 2 August. The full album (without voiceovers) was leaked on 21 September, as a result of several stores in Mexico selling the retail album much prior to the worldwide release date.

Pre-orders for Dark Passion Play had it certified gold in Finland before it had even been released. The album debuted at number one in 6 European countries, selling over 100,000 copies in Finland (triple platinum). In February 2008, the album was certified quadruple-platinum in Finland, after having sold over 120,000 copies, which makes it one of the 40 best-selling albums of all time in the country. Worldwide, Dark Passion Play has sold almost 2 million copies since its release.

== Background and production ==
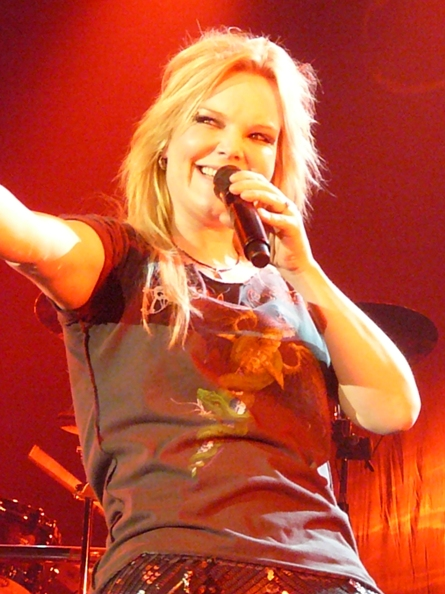
Anette Olzon (pictured), joined Nightwish replacing Tarja Turunen.

On 21 October 2005, after the Once Upon a Tour, the band's lead singer Tarja Turunen was dismissed via an open letter. In search of a replacement, the band conducted auditions from 17 March 2006 to 15 January 2007, receiving over 2000 demo tapes in the process. Amidst much speculation the new singer was officially announced on 24 May 2007 to be Anette Olzon, previously the singer for the Swedish AOR band Alyson Avenue. In an interview, Holopainen said they had made the decision in January 2007 based on the impression she made while performing the song "Ever Dream" from the album Century Child.

Of course it's gonna be a huge task for the singer – she will always be compared to Tarja but I'm pretty confident that she'll do well.
-Tuomas Holopainen regarding Anette Olzon's ability

The recording process started in the spring 2006 in different studios across Europe; the drums were recorded by Nevalainen in Hollola, Finland, at the Petrax Studios, Emppu Vuorinen recorded the guitars in Kerava, Finland, were also record the keyboards by Holopainen and the bass parts by Marko Hietala. Hietala is also the band's male singer, and in 2006 Hietala sung some of the new songs to record the demo versions as a base for the final recordings, with definitive vocals being recorded by Olzon at the Petrax in March 2007, immediately after being chosen to replace Tarja Turunen, and nearly two months before her name was given to the media and the fans.

When the drummer Jukka Nevalainen was asked about the overall cost of the new album, he was quoted as saying "Roughly half a million... We don't know the exact sum down to the euros and cents as yet." Half of this cost was incurred in London, over an expensive eight days at the Abbey Road Studios in London, UK, during which time the London Session Orchestra, the Metro Voices Choir, a gospel choir and two Irish musicians recorded their parts at the studio. In an interview with Kerrang! on 16 August 2008 Tuomas Holopainen recalled:

After the split with Tarja, we started writing without a singer, and it was quite a liberating feeling. We knew the right girl was out there somewhere, so we could just concentrate on the music. It took 10 months in the studio to make, but the atmosphere was so good and liberating there was a lot of bittersweet relief in the air. It was an extremely inspirational time.

"When I think back to it, it was such a crucial point to so many people, we didn't even realise back then but it showed us what we would be doing for the next year of our lives. We were never nervous about Anette, or the album being good, but we just couldn't tell how people would take it. Would they like Anette? Would they like the music? That was in the back of our minds all the time. And there was such a huge amount of money involved, over 800.000 euros, that we needed to sell at least a few albums to get going," Tuomas Holopainen recalled in 2008. According to Decibel, the album's studio bill was around US$680,000.

The orchestral line-up featured 66 members from the London Philharmonic Orchestra, 32 singers from The Metro Voices and twelve gospel singers. The final mixing process spent more than 75 days at the Finnvox Studios in Helsinki, Finland, the same place where Nightwish recorded all their previous albums.

== Music description ==
Before the album's release, band leader Tuomas Holopainen said in an interview that the album would have a lot in common with the previous album Once. For example, the band have kept the new kind of heavier songs, such as "Master Passion Greed", "Whoever Brings the Night", "7 Days to the Wolves", and "Bye Bye Beautiful", but additionally there are softer ballads, such as "Meadows of Heaven", "Eva", and "The Islander". This album includes many guest musicians and orchestral parts, just like Once, but with a bigger level.

Just like the album Once, Nightwish included many new influences and much experimentation in several tracks. On Once, much inspiration came from Native American music, especially "Creek Mary's Blood", which featured Lakota Indian musician John Two-Hawks. However, on Dark Passion Play, much inspiration comes from Finnish and Irish culture and music, which can be clearly heard on "Last of the Wilds". Songs like "Master Passion Greed" and "Cadence of Her Last Breath" included thrash metal and alternative metal elements as well, displaying the newer, more modern sound of the band. In a later interview, Hietela said the band "didn't get as far with it [the song] as we wanted to when we recorded the song in the studio – we wanted it to be a little bit more impressive".

Holopainen also said that there are darker pieces reminiscent of the album Century Child, such as "The Poet and the Pendulum", and some others. It will be a dark album, both musically and lyrically. Even though the album is much more upbeat than Century Child. Songs that reflect this mood are for example the second single "Amaranth" and "Bye Bye Beautiful"'s B-side "Escapist."

The extremes are there more than ever before. So it's not going to be like Century Child 2. There is more hope in some of the new songs.
-Tuomas Holopainen, band leader, keyboardist, and main composer.

== Reception ==
Professional ratings
Review scores
Source	Rating
About.com	4/5 stars
AllMusic	3/5 stars
Blabbermouth.net	7.5/10 stars
Metal Hammer (GER)	6/7 stars
metal1.info (GER)	9.5/10 stars
Metal Storm	7.5/10 stars
PopMatters	5/10
Ultimate-Guitar.com	8.8/10 stars

The album has sold more than 130,000 copies in Finland to date, placing 26th on the list of best-selling Finnish albums ever released, which has granted it a platinum certification four times. Worldwide, it has sold over 700,000 copies by the end of 2007 and about 2 million copies to date. It has been certified as Platinum in Germany and Hungary, and Gold in Austria, Poland, Sweden and Switzerland; Dark Passion Play is also the most successful Nightwish album in UK and USA with sales in the United States of over 134,000 copies.

As of January 2008, the album has topped the album charts in six countries; the singles, "Amaranth" and "Erämaan Viimeinen" have both reached the first position on Finnish charts. According to Last.fm, "Dark Passion Play" is their most played album, and its successful single "Amaranth" has as of February 2009 been holding the position of most played song since its release.

The album was also critically acclaimed in most reviews. Allmusic called the album a "sort of opera aria" and praised "Bye Bye Beautiful", on a track pic and "Eva", that they say it focus on the new vocalist vocal abilities.

The album was also given a positive review by Blabbermouth's Keith Bergman, who gave the album a 7.5 out of 10 and stated that it "may not be a masterpiece throughout, but it's got enough moments of symphonic metal bliss to warrant a high recommendation. About.com writer, Chad Bowar, gave the album a score of 4 out of 5 stars, calling Dark Passion Play "an excellent album that's right up there with the best the band has done."

== Legacy ==
In 2016, an article by Teamrock considers Dark Passion Play as one of the "best albums of this century", ranking it at number 60 on their countdown of the "21st century's greatest albums".

In November 2014, the NHL hockey team Minnesota Wild featured the album's first track "The Poet and the Pendulum" in their season trailer.

The instrumental version of "Whoever Brings the Night" is used in the 2011 puzzle-platform video game, LittleBigPlanet 2.

== Promotion ==
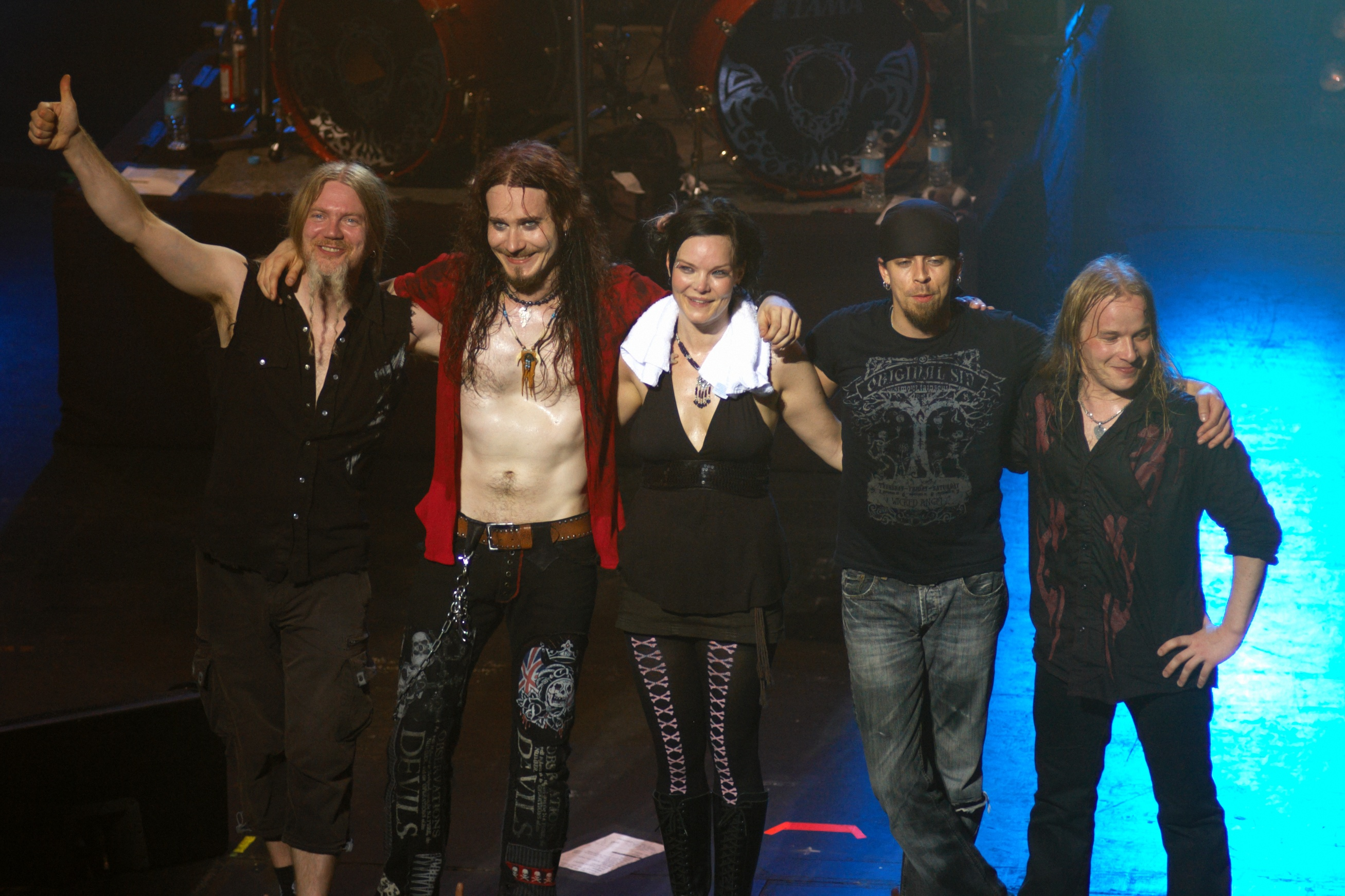
Nightwish ending a concert in Melbourne, on 31 January 2008.

To promote the release of the album, Nightwish played the Dark Passion Play World Tour, that took place from 2007 to 2009.

On 22 September 2007, the band hosted a secret concert at Rock Café in Tallinn, Estonia, disguising itself as a Nightwish cover band called "Nachtwasser". Their first official concert with the new singer was in Tel Aviv, Israel on 6 October 2007. The Dark Passion Play tour thus started, visiting the United States, Canada, most of Europe, Asia, and Australia. In 2008, the band played over 100 shows, with dates in Oceania, Europe and Asia. In November, the band played in South America, and before this leg they took a three-month break; Nightwish began the third leg in 2009, with dates in North America and Europe, and also playing in several summer metal festivals, including Graspop Metal Meeting and Masters of Rock. The last show was played in Helsinki, Finland, in front of 10,000 fans.

The support bands were changing throughout the tour. The frequent acts were the Finnish pop rock female group Indica, Swedish metal band Sonic Syndicate and the Swedish industrial metal band Pain. The USA tour was supported by Gothic metal band Paradise Lost. In the last concert, the opening band was the Finnish act Apocalyptica. An EP/DVD, Made in Hong Kong, with 8 live tracks recorded during the tour in various concerts, was released on 11 March 2009. The DVD contains three music videos as well as a documentary featuring material from Israel to South America, directed by Ville Lipiäinen.

== Track listing ==
All lyrics are written by Tuomas Holopainen, except where noted; all music is composed by Holopainen, except where noted.

Dark Passion Play track listing
No.	Title	Music	Length
1.	"The Poet and the Pendulum": I. "White Lands of Empathica"; II. "Home"; III. "The Pacific"; IV. "Dark Passion Play"; V. "Mother and Father"		13:53
2.	"Bye Bye Beautiful"		4:15
3.	"Amaranth"		3:51
4.	"Cadence of Her Last Breath"		4:15
5.	"Master Passion Greed"		5:58
6.	"Eva"		4:26
7.	"Sahara"		5:46
8.	"Whoever Brings the Night"	Emppu Vuorinen	4:16
9.	"For the Heart I Once Had"		3:56
10.	"The Islander"	Marko Hietala	5:06
11.	"Last of the Wilds"		5:41
12.	"7 Days to the Wolves"	Holopainen; Hietala	7:03
13.	"Meadows of Heaven"		7:10
Total length:			75:36

Japanese bonus track
No.	Title	Length
14.	"Escapist"	4:57
Total length:		80:33

== Charts ==
=== Weekly charts ===
Weekly chart performance for Dark Passion Play
Chart (2007)	Peak position
Australian Albums (ARIA)	42
Austrian Albums (Ö3 Austria)	5
Belgian Albums (Ultratop Flanders)	18
Belgian Albums (Ultratop Wallonia)	17
Canadian Albums (Nielsen SoundScan)	24
Czech Albums (ČNS IFPI)	3
Danish Albums (Hitlisten)	18
Dutch Albums (Album Top 100)	5
European Albums (Billboard)	4
Finnish Albums (Suomen virallinen lista)	1
French Albums (SNEP)	6
German Albums (Offizielle Top 100)	1
Greek Albums (IFPI)	9
Hungarian Albums (MAHASZ)	1
Irish Albums (IRMA)	62
Italian Albums (FIMI)	14
Italian Albums (Musica e dischi)	16
Japanese Albums (Oricon)	54
Mexican Albums (Top 100 Mexico)	22
Norwegian Albums (VG-lista)	7
Polish Albums (ZPAV)	6
Scottish Albums (Official Charts)	29
Spanish Albums (Promusicae)	33
Swedish Albums (Sverigetopplistan)	4
Swedish Hard Rock Albums (Sverigetopplistan)	1
Swiss Albums (Schweizer Hitparade)	1
UK Albums (Official Charts)	25
UK Rock & Metal Albums (Official Charts)	2
US Billboard 200	84
US Top Hard Rock Albums (Billboard)	7
US Top Rock Albums (Billboard)	23

=== Year-end charts ===
Year-end chart performance for Dark Passion Play
Chart (2007)	Position
Austrian Albums (Ö3 Austria)	69
European Albums (Billboard)	54
Finnish Albums (Suomen virallinen lista)	1
French Albums (SNEP)	177
German Albums (Offizielle Top 100)	56
Hungarian Albums (MAHASZ)	84
Swedish Albums (Sverigetopplistan)	56
Swedish Albums & Compilations (Sverigetopplistan)	69
Swiss Albums (Schweizer Hitparade)	24

== Certifications ==
Certifications for Dark Passion Play
Region	Certification	Certified units/sales
Austria (IFPI Austria)	Gold	10,000^{*}
Finland (Musiikkituottajat)	2× Platinum	126,084
Germany (BVMI)	Platinum	200,000^{^}
Poland (ZPAV)	Gold	10,000^{*}
Sweden (GLF)	Gold	20,000^{^}
Switzerland (IFPI Switzerland)	Gold	15,000^{^}
United Kingdom (BPI)	Silver	60,000^{‡}
^{*} Sales figures based on certification alone.^{^} Shipments figures based on certification alone.^{‡} Sales+streaming figures based on certification alone.

== Personnel ==
Credits for Dark Passion Play adapted from liner notes.

=== The band ===
- Anette Olzon – lead vocals (except 5, 11)
- Tuomas Holopainen – keyboards, backing vocals (5)
- Emppu Vuorinen – guitars, acoustic guitar
- Marko Hietala – bass, acoustic guitar (10), male vocals (1, 2, 4, 5, 10, and 12)
- Jukka Nevalainen – drums, percussion

=== Main crew ===
- Tero Kinnunen – sound engineer
- Mikko Karmila – mixing
- Mika Jussila – mastering engineer
- James Shearman – orchestra and choir conductor
- Pip Williams – orchestral arrangements

=== Guest musicians ===
- London Philharmonic Orchestra – orchestral parts
- Metro Voices – choir
- Troy Donockley – bodhran, uilleann pipes, low whistle and tin whistle (on track 10, 11 and 13)
- Guy Elliott – lead treble (on track 1)
- Tom Williams – second treble (on track 1)
- James SK Wān – third treble (on track 1)
- Nollaig Casey – violin (on track 11)
- Senni Eskelinen – electric kantele (on track 11)

== See also ==
- List of best-selling albums in Finland
