= Erämaan viimeinen =

Single by Nightwish featuring Jonsu

from the album Dark Passion Play
- Language: Finnish
- English title: Last of the Wilds
- B-side: "Escapist"
- Released: December 5, 2007
- Genre: Folk metal; Celtic metal; Symphonic metal
- Length: 5:08
- Label: Spinefarm
- Songwriter: Tuomas Holopainen
- Producer: Tuomas Holopainen

Nightwish singles chronology
| "Amaranth" (2007) | "Erämaan viimeinen" (2007) | "Bye Bye Beautiful" (2008) |

"Erämaan Viimeinen" (English: Last of the Wilds) is a single by the Finnish symphonic metal band Nightwish, released on December 5, 2007.

It is the same song as the instrumental "Last of the Wilds" from the band's album Dark Passion Play, but with Finnish lyrics and Jonsu from Indica on vocals, and became the second single from the album after "Amaranth".

The single was not, like the earlier single "Kuolema Tekee Taiteilijan", released outside Finland, where it peaked at number one in the charts. On January 20, 2010, German magazine Metal Hammer released the CD exclusively with the magazine in German-speaking countries, featuring the CD plus two versions of "Escapist". The song is also included on the Platinum Edition of Dark Passion Play.

"Erämaan viimeinen" is not an exact replica of "Last of the Wilds". It has vocals and lyrics, there is no seashore-sound in the beginning, there is an additional keyboard-track in the C-part and the kantele-outro has been removed.

== Track listing ==
Standard Edition
| No. | Title | Writer(s) | Length |
|---|---|---|---|
| 1. | "Erämaan Viimeinen" (feat. Jonsu) | Tuomas Holopainen | 5:11 |
| 2. | "Erämaan Viimeinen" (Instrumental) | Tuomas Holopainen | 5:40 |
| 3. | "Escapist" (Metal Hammer Promo Single only) | Tuomas Holopainen | 5:01 |
| 4. | "Escapist" (Instrumental, Metal Hammer Promo Single only) | Tuomas Holopainen | 4:57 |

== Personnel ==
- Tuomas Holopainen - keyboards
- Emppu Vuorinen - lead guitar
- Jukka Nevalainen - drums
- Marko Hietala - bass

=== Guests ===
- Jonsu - lead vocals
- Troy Donockley - Uilleann pipes
