= Anette Olzon =

Swedish singer (born 1971)

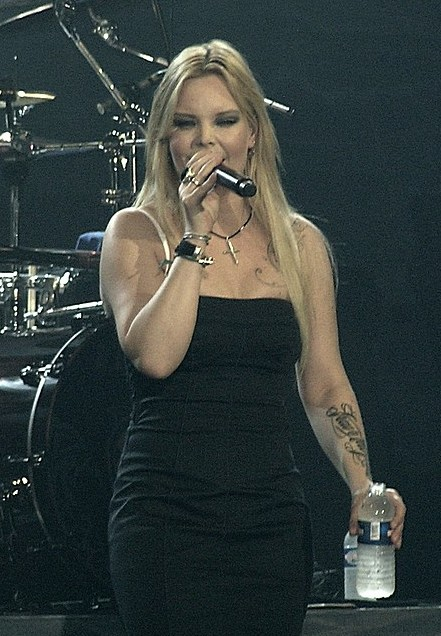
- Olzon performing with Nightwish in 2009 at Mantova, Italy.

Background information
- Born: Anette Ingegerd Olsson; 21 June 1971 (age 55); Katrineholm, Sweden
- Genres: Symphonic metal; power metal; pop rock
- Occupation: Singer
- Years active: 1988–present
- Member of: Alyson Avenue; The Dark Element
- Formerly of: Nightwish

Anette Ingegerd Olsson (born 21 June 1971), known by the stage name Anette Olzon, is a Swedish singer, best known as the former lead vocalist of Finnish symphonic metal band Nightwish from 2007 to 2012. She is also the vocalist of Swedish classic rock band Alyson Avenue, and of the Finnish heavy metal band The Dark Element.

== Early life ==
Olzon was raised in a musical family and has been singing since childhood. Her mother also forced her to play the oboe for eight years. She toured with her mother's band and sang with them on some occasions. Later, she started to take part in various talent shows and received laudable recognition. The first band she joined at seventeen years of age (Take Cover) was a cover band. However, it was short-lived as she took part in several bands and projects. At 21, she played the leading role in the rock opera/musical "Gränsland" in Helsingborg. After that she got into the Balettakademien in Gothenburg. She sang in choirs, did studio work for various projects and occasionally performed as a wedding singer. Olzon also sang a duet with Michael Bormann (ex-Jaded Heart singer) on his album Conspiracy.

In her earlier days, Olzon took singing lessons at the Copenhagen Music Conservatorie, in Helsingør, Denmark, with a private teacher. She also took lessons from a private teacher at the Malmö Music University.

Before singing, Olzon has worked in a factory, in a hamburger restaurant, as a waitress, as a veterinarian assistant, in a number of offices and as a hair dresser. She has also studied musical artist education, psychology, project management and leadership and organization.

== Career ==
=== With Alyson Avenue (1999–2005, 2018) ===
Olzon then joined Alyson Avenue, at first only as a studio singer, but later as their leading lady, replacing the male vocalist. The band received huge feedback for a demo they sent out in 1999, and Alyson Avenue was soon able to contact various labels. Main composer and keyboardist Niclas Olsson gathered the band, recording a four track demo which resulted in a record deal with AOR Heaven.

In November 2000, their debut album Presence of Mind was released to positive reviews. The next album Omega was released in 2004. Olzon left Alyson Avenue in 2006. In May 2009, Alyson Avenue introduced Arabella Vitanc as their new lead vocalist.

In 2018, the band reunited and played at Melodicrockfest Scandinavia in Malmö in early June.

=== With Nightwish (2007–2012) ===
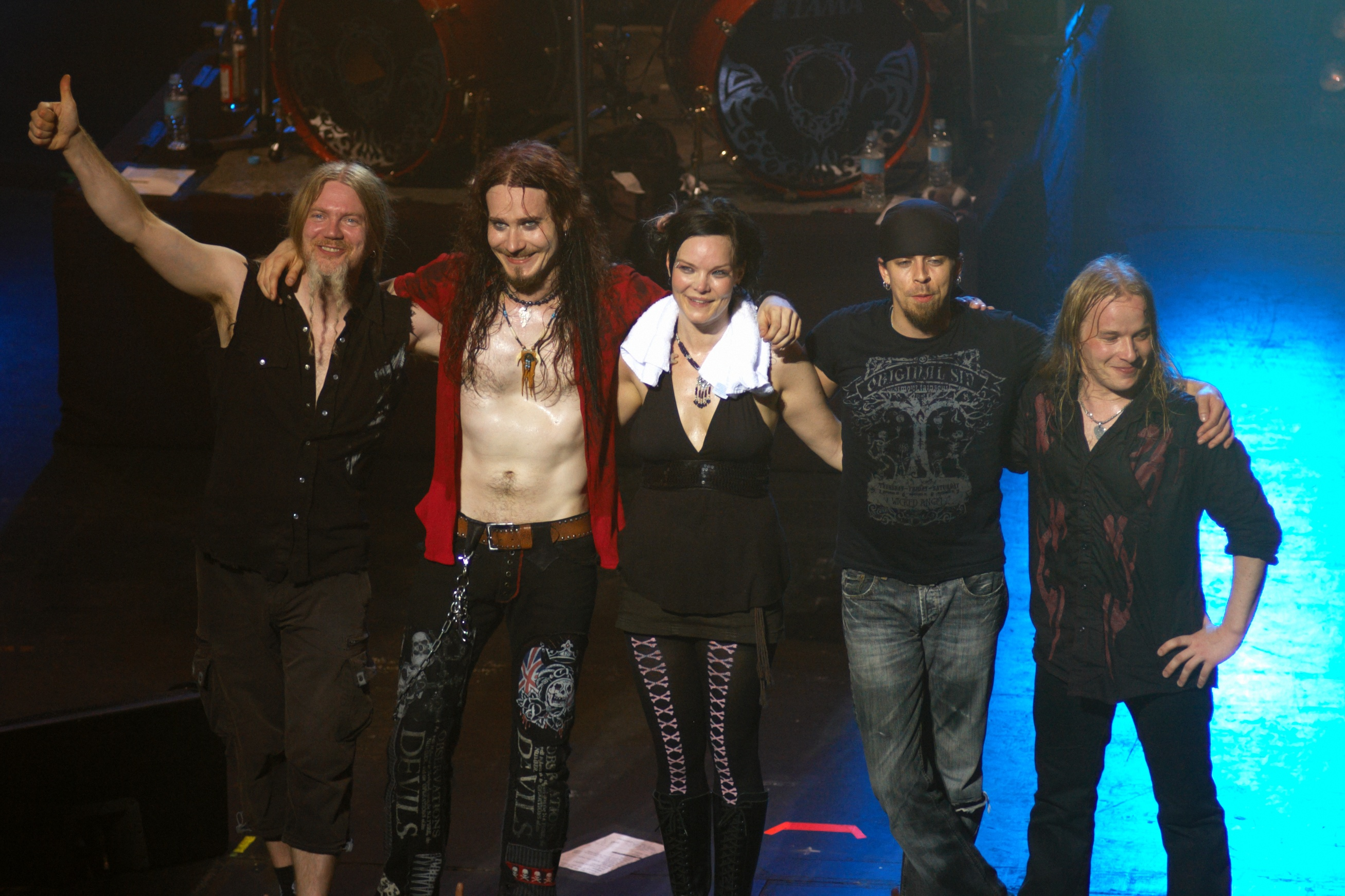
Olzon live with Nightwish in Melbourne, Australia, on 30 January 2008

Olzon officially joined Nightwish as their new lead singer in early 2007, chosen from about 2,000 applicants of which 10 made it to prove their place in front of the band. The song on her demo tape was the 2002 single "Ever Dream". She replaced the previous singer Tarja Turunen, who was fired in an open letter in the autumn of 2005. Olzon's demo was one of the first that Nightwish received, although she was originally denied the position, as band leader Tuomas Holopainen was concerned about the fact that she had a young son. However, Olzon was persistent and sent the band a live DVD of her performing with Alyson Avenue. She was then contacted by Nightwish's manager Ewo Pohjola, which eventually led to her taking up the position in February 2007. Tuomas commented on her selection saying "we (the band) took a formal vote, but it was unanimous that she would be the one. It was a matter of heart. We felt she was right." Her identity was kept secret by various methods, including pretending to be Ewo's "Swedish cousin" at a Tarot concert, until she was eventually announced as the new Nightwish singer on 24 May 2007.

The day after this revelation, 25 May 2007, charity single "Eva" was released as the first off the album, as download only. It was originally scheduled for release on 30 May but this was changed due to a leak on a British music download site. This was the first published song to feature Olzon. On 13 June Nightwish released the title, Dark Passion Play, and artwork to the new album on their official website, as well as the name and the cover of the second single (this time CD), "Amaranth". "Amaranth" achieved gold status in Finland after less than two days in stores.

Dark Passion Play was released around Europe in the last week of September 2007, in the UK on 1 October and the United States on 2 October. It was awarded double platinum in Finland the second day after its release and took the No.1 position on the charts of Germany, Finland, Switzerland, Hungary and Croatia and got in top 100 in other 16 countries, including the United States. Dark Passion Play has sold 6× Platinum worldwide up to date (over 1.5 million copies).

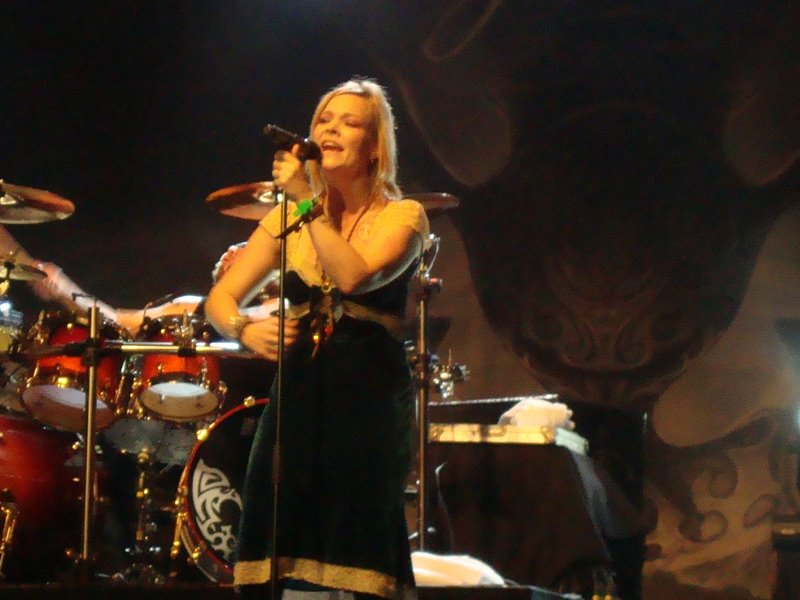
Olzon performing with Nightwish in Belo Horizonte, Brazil, on 10 November 2008

On 22 September 2007, the band hosted a secret concert at Rock Café in Tallinn, Estonia, disguising itself as a Nightwish cover band called "Nachtwasser". Their first official concert with the new singer was in Tel Aviv, Israel on 6 October 2007. The Dark Passion Play tour thus started, visiting the United States, Canada, most of Europe, Asia, and Australia. The Dark Passion Play World Tour was Nightwish's longest tour at the time, lasting from October 2007 to September 2009. The tour ended with a concert at Hartwall Arena, Helsinki, with the band Apocalyptica.

In October 2010, Nightwish began recording for the album Imaginaerum, with Olzon recording her vocals for the album in April 2011 at Finnvox Studios, Helsinki. The album was released on 30 November 2011 and was followed by the Imaginaerum World Tour, beginning on 21 January 2012. Olzon, along with the rest of Nightwish, starred in the film Imaginaerum, which featured music from the band.

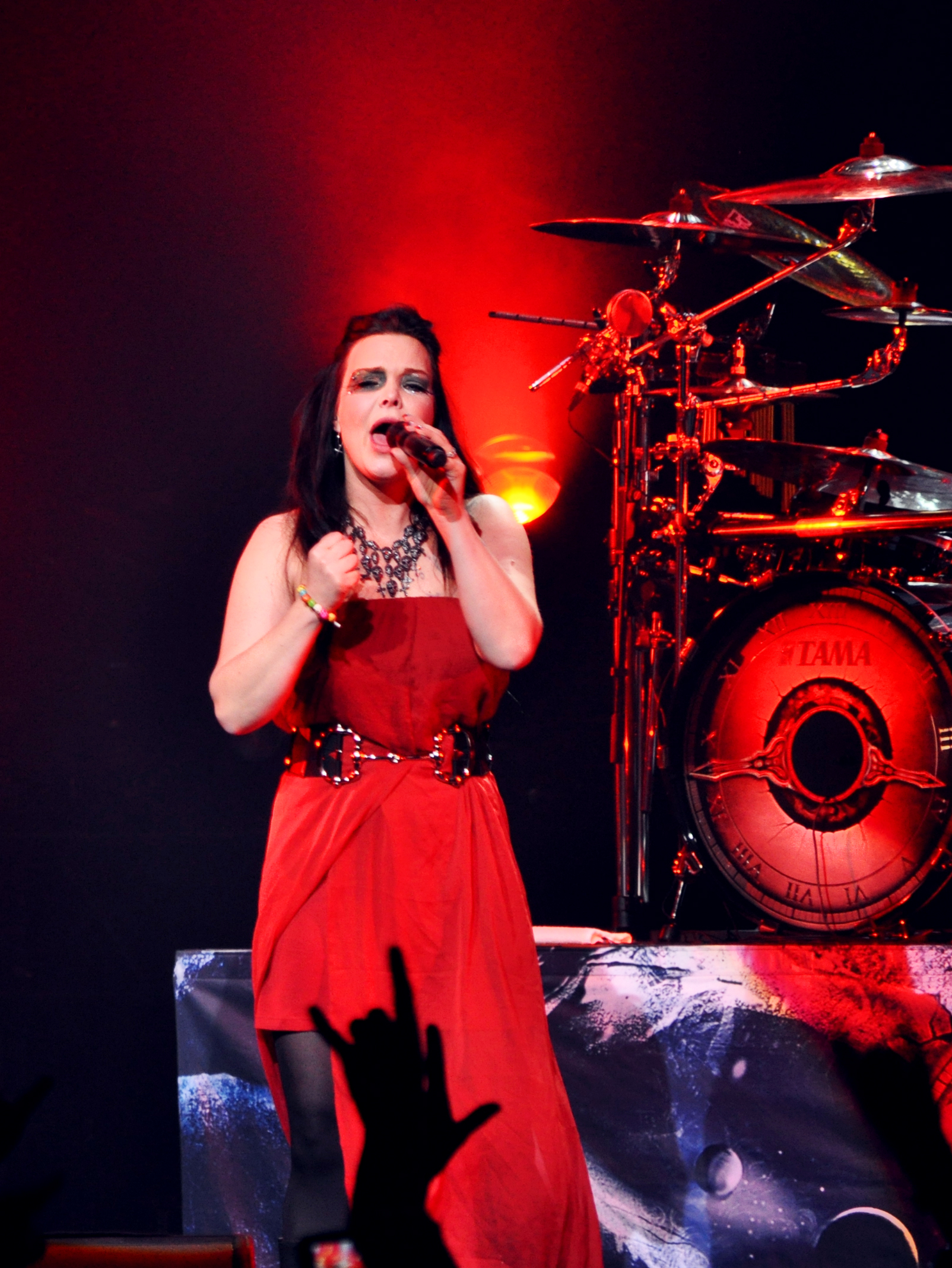
Anette Olzon in 2012

On 1 October 2012, Nightwish and Olzon went their separate ways. Her final performance with Nightwish was on 29 September, at The Complex, Salt Lake City. While Olzon stated in an interview that she was fired from the band after she revealed to them she was pregnant, Nightwish made a subsequent statement denying this - they were all congratulative to her, and stating that "[t]he split with Anette wasn't because of pregnancy or illness. We discovered her personality didn't fit this work community, and was even detrimental to it." In a 2021 interview with Blabbermouth.net, Olzon revealed that she wanted the band's tour dates pushed back due to her pregnancy, but Holopainen denied the request. She was also against the band's decision to bring in Floor Jansen as the substitute vocalist out of fear for her job.

=== Solo career (2012–present) ===
Following her departure from Nightwish, Olzon began writing and recording material for a future solo album. In an interview with 'Dark Sirens' in October 2013, Olzon stated that her solo album would be released sometime in 2014.

It was announced on 28 November 2013 that Olzon's debut solo album will be called Shine. The album has been produced by Stefan Örn and Johan Glössner and co-produced by Olzon and Johan Kronlund. About the album, Olzon said: "The overall message of the album is that life can be really dark and filled with hardship and sadness, but you can always choose to see some light coming through, to make you stronger and full of life – making you SHINE... no matter what." Olzon described the album's musical direction as "a pop rock album maybe, or would you call it pop metal?". On 27 January, Olzon announced that the release date for her album had been pushed a month, making the new release date 28 March 2014

The first song from Shine, "Falling", was released for digital download on 17 December 2013 along with a lyric video on YouTube. A teaser for the album's first official single, "Lies", was posted on Olzon's official Facebook page on 7 February 2014; followed by the single's eventual release on 14 February 2014.

In a June 2015 interview, Olzon said she had plans for a future second album, but details are still being discussed with her new label.

On 19 January 2016, Olzon released an EP with only two songs, a Swedish song called "Vintersjäl" and an English song called "Cold Outside" only available for digital download.

On 21 June 2021, Olzon released the single "Parasite" from the album Strong, which was later released on 10 September 2021.

On 22 February 2024, Olzon released the first single entitled "Heed the Call" from her third studio album Rapture.

In late 2025, Olzon went on a South American tour performing songs from the two Nightwish albums that she recorded in Brazil, Peru, Argentina and Chile. She was accompanied by the four Brazilian musicians Filipe Duarte, Sanzio Rocha, Vithor Moraes and Kiko Lopes, whom were the current line up for her solo shows. Three more dates were announced for 2026 with the same band, but will be accompanied by an orchestra and choir.

=== Other works (2017–present) ===
Olzon has played with several bands, in studio and live, including Brother Firetribe on the song "Heart Full of Fire" from the album of the same name in 2008, The Rasmus on the single "October & April" in 2009, Pain on the song "Follow Me", "Feed Us" from Cynic Paradise in 2008 and Black Mount Rise on the single "Apart & Astray" in 2015.

On 13 August 2009, Olzon sang two Nightwish songs, "Kuolema Tekee Taiteilijan" and "Meadows of Heaven", with the Swedish Radio Symphony Orchestra, at the Suomi Safari – the event was in celebration of Sweden and Finland relations.

On 30 November 2012, Olzon sang at the opening gala of Helsingborg Arena, where she performed two songs from her own material.

Anette Olzon was featured on the second season of the Finnish competition show Tähdet, Tähdet in 2015. Along with the several popular Finnish musical artists, Olzon performed their own covers of songs from various genres, with one singer being dropped out of the competition each week by televote. Olzon was the only foreign artist to be featured on the program, though she performed one song partly in Finnish. She was eliminated on the fifth week of the show.

Olzon began collaborating with former Sonata Arctica guitarist Jani Liimatainen for a project known as The Dark Element which formed in August 2017. The debut self-titled album was released on 10 November 2017. Their second album, Songs the Night Sings, was released on 8 November 2019.

Olzon collaborated with Symphony X vocalist Russell Allen in 2020, under the name Allen/Olzon. Worlds Apart, their debut album, was released on 6 March 2020.

Olzon's third solo studio album, "Rapture", was released on 10 May 2024, featuring the singles "Heed the Call", "Day of Wrath", and "Rapture".

== Influences ==
Olzon has mentioned Natalie Cole and Celine Dion as being her inspirations in singing. She has also stated that she admires symphonic metal vocalists Sharon den Adel and Simone Simons, and she has also stated on her blog that she enjoys and admires Tarja Turunen's solo work.

== Personal life ==
Olzon lives in Helsingborg with her husband, former Pain bassist Johan Husgafvel, whom she married on 10 August 2013, and her three sons: Seth Blyckert (born 11 July 2001) from her first marriage, Nemo (born 30 July 2010), and Mio (born 28 March 2013). As of 2020, she is working full-time as a nurse.

== Discography ==
Studio albums:

- Shine (2014)
- Strong (2021)
- Rapture (2024)

=== Nightwish ===
Studio albums:

- Dark Passion Play (2007)
- Imaginaerum (2011)

Soundtracks:

- Imaginaerum: The Score (2012)

EPs, Live Albums & MCDs:

- Made in Hong Kong (And in Various Other Places) (2009)

=== Alyson Avenue ===
Studio albums:

- Presence of Mind (2000)
- Omega (2004)

=== The Dark Element ===
Studio albums:

- The Dark Element (2017)
- Songs the Night Sings (2019)

=== Allen/Olzon ===
Studio albums:

- Worlds Apart (2020)
- Army of Dreamers (2022)

=== Heart Healer ===
Studio albums:

- Heart Healer: the Metal Opera by Magnus Karlsson (2021)

=== Ultima Grace ===
Studio albums:

- Ultima Grace (2022)
