= Nightwish =

Finnish symphonic metal band

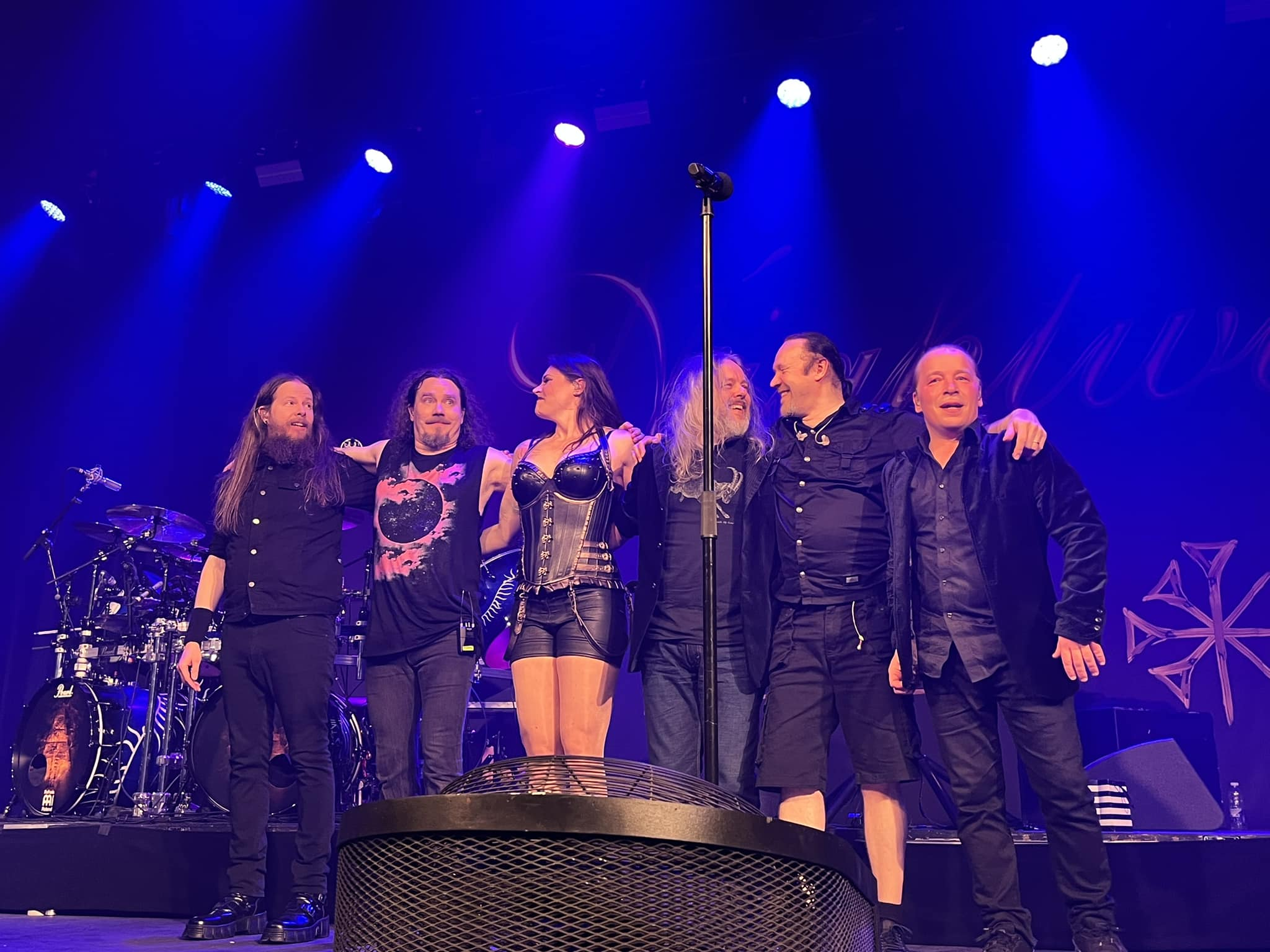
- Nightwish after a performance in Toronto in May 2022; (L–R): Jukka Koskinen, Tuomas Holopainen, Floor Jansen, Troy Donockley, Kai Hahto, and Emppu Vuorinen.

Background information
- Origin: Kitee, Finland
- Genres: Symphonic metal; power metal; progressive metal; gothic metal
- Works: Discography; tours
- Years active: 1996–present
- Labels: Spinefarm; Nuclear Blast; Roadrunner; Century Media; Drakkar Entertainment
- Members: Tuomas Holopainen; Emppu Vuorinen; Troy Donockley; Kai Hahto; Jukka Koskinen
- Past members: Tarja Turunen; Jukka Nevalainen; Sami Vänskä; Marko Hietala; Anette Olzon; Floor Jansen
- Website: nightwish.com

Nightwish are a Finnish symphonic metal band from Kitee. The band was formed in 1996 by keyboardist Tuomas Holopainen, guitarist Emppu Vuorinen, and former lead vocalist Tarja Turunen. The lineup grew with drummer Jukka Nevalainen and bassist Sami Vänskä. In 2001, Vänskä was replaced by Marko Hietala, who also took over the male vocalist role previously filled by Holopainen or guest singers. Nightwish has been successful in Finland since the release of their debut album, Angels Fall First (1997), and were later recognized internationally through the release of their albums Oceanborn (1998), Wishmaster (2000), Century Child (2002) and Once (2004).

After Turunen's dismissal from the band in 2005, Anette Olzon joined as her replacement and recorded two albums with the band: Dark Passion Play (2007) and Imaginaerum (2011), before leaving in 2012. In 2013, Floor Jansen took over as lead vocalist and became a permanent member of the band alongside Troy Donockley. After the release of Endless Forms Most Beautiful (2015), Nevalainen left the band in 2019, and Kai Hahto, who had acted as his replacement since 2014, became the official drummer. Hietala left the band in 2021, and Jukka Koskinen was announced as his replacement in 2022. The band's ninth and tenth studio albums, Human. :II: Nature. and Yesterwynde, were released in 2020 and 2024, respectively. Ahead of the release of Yesterwynde, the band announced they would be going on a touring hiatus. Jansen left the band in October 2026.

Nightwish is the third-best-selling musical act in Finland with certified sales of nearly 900,000 copies. The group has sold more than 10 million records and received over 60 gold and platinum awards. In 2018, Nightwish was inducted into the Finnish Music Hall of Fame, becoming the honorary gallery's 11th member.

== History ==
=== 1996–1998: Formation and Angels Fall First ===
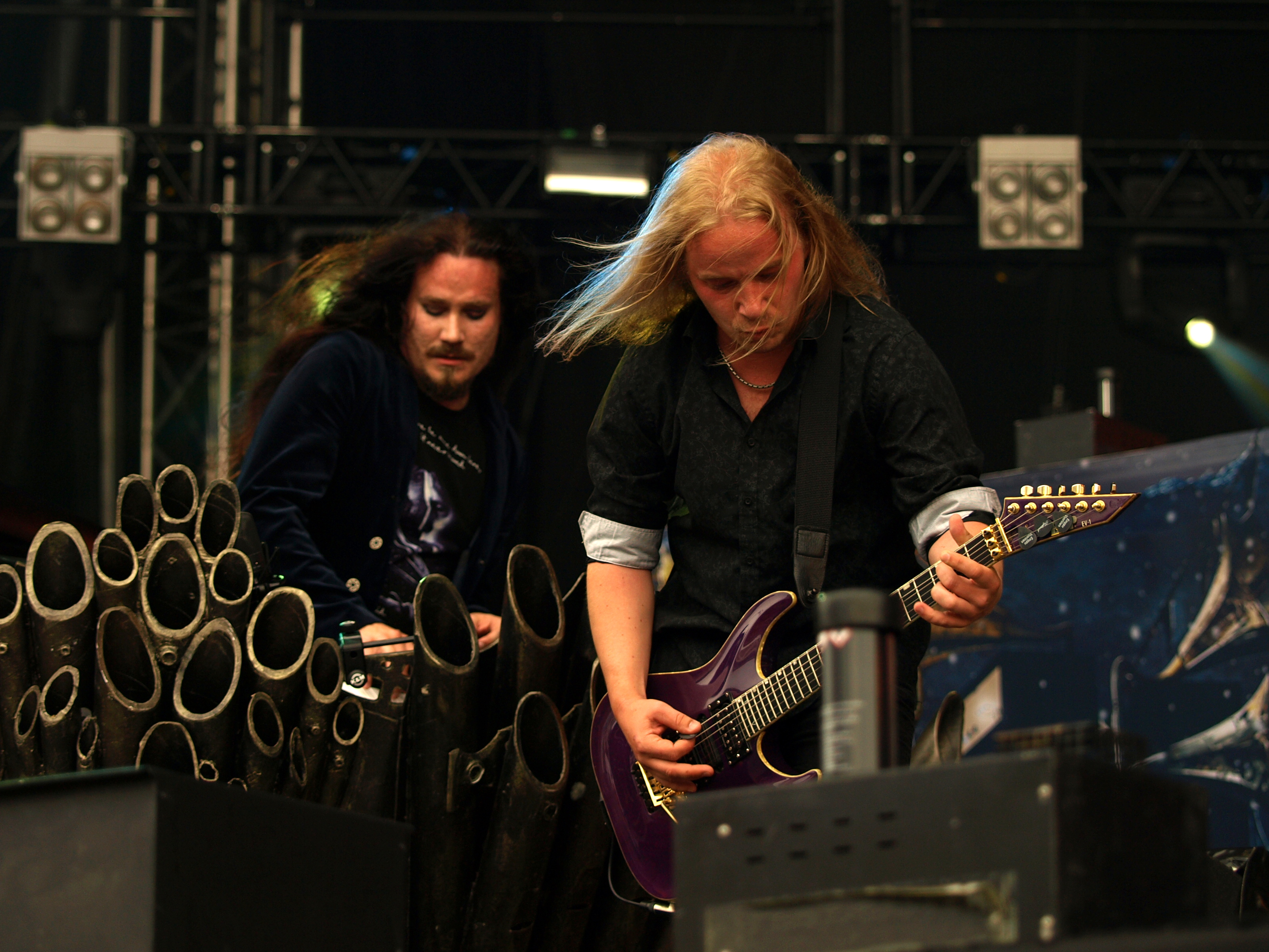
Tuomas Holopainen (left) and Emppu Vuorinen (right), two of the band's founding members, and the only founding members still left in the band

After playing keyboards in several heavy metal bands in the 1990s, including Darkwoods My Betrothed, Tuomas Holopainen decided to create his own project while sitting around a campfire with friends on 6 July 1996. He immediately had a clear idea of the music: experimental acoustic music he had written himself during his time in the Finnish Army, similar to the music usually played around campfires, but with a distinct sound and atmosphere and played on his keyboards.

We were sitting by the fire, Teemu Kautonen, Tero Leinonen, the whole old gang. It was there that I got the idea: what if I put together my own project? I hadn't yet come up with the name 'Nightwish', but the concept was already in my head. The band would be acoustic and its style would be mood music. It wouldn't be heavy metal at all – we'd have acoustic guitar, some flutes, strings, piano, keyboards, and definitely a female vocalist. It was clear that it had to have a female singer, because at the time, The 3rd and the Mortal, Theatre of Tragedy from Norway, and The Gathering from Holland were a big thing to me. Ulver's album Kveldssanger was also a big influence. I listened to Kveldssanger a lot and thought that maybe I should try to do that kind of stuff even better.
— Tuomas Holopainen

He soon invited friend and schoolmate Erno "Emppu" Vuorinen to play acoustic guitars, and the classical vocalist Tarja Turunen, who had shared the same music teacher, Plamen Dimov, a few years earlier. The three musicians recorded their self-titled acoustic demo in late 1996. The demo included their first song together, "Nightwish" (from which the band derived its name), as well as "The Forever Moments" and an early version of "Etiäinen".

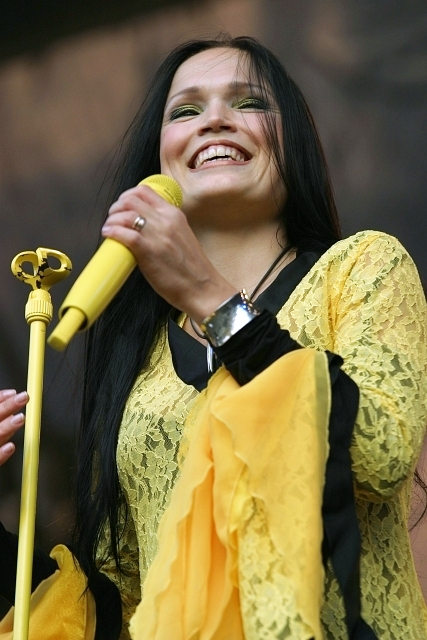
Tarja Turunen was the band's first lead vocalist from 1996 to 2005.

In early 1997, Jukka "Julius" Nevalainen joined the band, and acoustic guitar was replaced with electric guitar. The addition of heavy metal elements to Nightwish's existing experimental music gave the band a different sound, forming the core of the band's distinct style.

The band entered the studio in April 1997 to record seven songs for their second demo, titled Angels Fall First. In May 1997, the demo made its way to the Finnish record label Spinefarm Records, who wanted to release it as the band's debut album. The label offered Nightwish a record deal, and the band returned to the studio to record four more songs to complement the tracks of the demo. The full-length Angels Fall First album was released in November 1997 and reached number 31 on the Finnish album charts, with the single "The Carpenter" reaching number 3 on the Finnish singles chart; "The Carpenter" single was released as a split with fellow Spinefarm artists Children of Bodom and Thy Serpent. The album is also one of the two releases which features Holopainen's vocals, appearing on four of the album's eleven tracks alongside Turunen's.

The band made their live debut in their hometown Kitee at the Huvikeskus on 31 December 1997, in front of 400 people. The band recalled being both nervous and terrified when performing for the first time. Since they were missing a bass player, Samppa Hirvonen joined them as a sessional live member. Marianna Pellinen was also a sessional live member as an additional keyboard player and a backing vocalist for Turunen. There were plans to make Hirvonen a permanent member, but he joined the army as part of Finnish army conscription just as they began recording Oceanborn, so they asked Sami Vänskä to join instead, since Tuomas knew him from the band Nattvindens Gråt. During early 1998, the band performed seven concerts, while Turunen was finishing her schooling, and Nevalainen and Vuorinen were serving their obligatory Finnish military service. They played warm-up shows for bands Babylon Whores, Children of Bodom and Tarot.

=== 1998–2000: International success with Oceanborn and Wishmaster ===
Nightwish returned to the studio in August 1998 as a five-piece to record a follow-up for Spinefarm Records, which would become their second full-length album, Oceanborn. Adopting a more technical and progressive sound than Angels Fall First, Oceanborn saw the band abandon much of the ambient and folk elements present on their debut release, with the exception of the song "Moondance". In contrast to the female vocals of Turunen, the album also featured guest growling vocals by Tapio Wilska, since Tuomas did not want to sing again.

The AllMusic review said that the album "as a whole works great", with songs that are "very strong". Oceanborn was released on 7 December 1998 in Finland only. It was an instant success, reaching number 5 on the Finnish album charts. The album's first single, "Sacrament of Wilderness", hit number 1 on the Finnish singles charts, where it stayed for several weeks. The album's release was initially limited to Finland, but because of the success of "Sacrament of Wilderness", Spinefarm released Oceanborn internationally in the spring of 1999. In May 1999, Nightwish recorded the song "Sleeping Sun", and 13,000 copies of its single were purchased in pre-release sales in Germany alone. Following the band's first international success, Nightwish was added as the opening band for Rage's 1999 European tour. Both the album Oceanborn and the singles "Sacrament of Wilderness" and "Walking in the Air" were certified gold in Finland in August 1999.

While working in the studio on their third album in early 2000, Nightwish participated in the Finnish Eurovision Song Contest national selection with the song "Sleepwalker". Despite winning the public vote in the final, Nightwish eventually finished in third place, with the jury choosing gospel singer Nina Åström to represent Finland.

On 19 May 2000, Nightwish released their third studio album, Wishmaster. It debuted and spent three weeks at number one on the Finnish album charts, selling enough records to be certified gold in Finland. Critical response to the album was mixed, with AllMusic calling the album repetitive, and saying "as a whole album, it can be a little annoying, even frustrating". However, German magazine Rock Hard declared Wishmaster "Album of the Month", despite competing against long-awaited May releases from Iron Maiden and Bon Jovi. Following the release of Wishmaster, Nightwish embarked on their first world tour, playing dates in South America, Mexico and Canada. In the summer, the band returned to Europe for their first headlining European tour with Sinergy and Eternal Tears of Sorrow, appearing at the Wacken Open Air festival and the Biebop Metal Fest.

=== 2001–2003: Arrival of Hietala and symphonic elements with Century Child ===
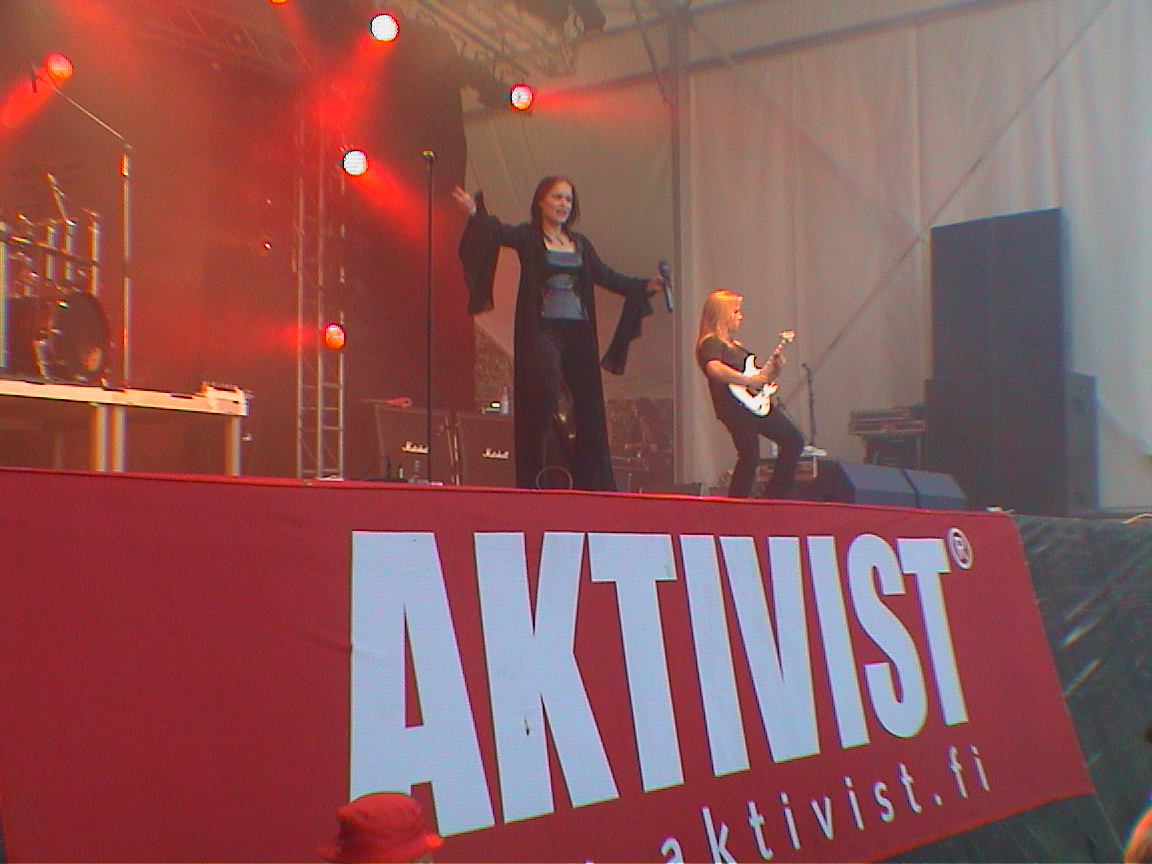
Nightwish live at Ruisrock on 7 July 2001

In 2001, Nightwish recorded a cover of Gary Moore's "Over the Hills and Far Away" together with two new songs "10th Man Down" and "Away", and a remake of "Astral Romance" (originally from the Angels Fall First album) with Tony Kakko (Sonata Arctica) singing Tuomas' male vocals part. This new material was released as their first (and until 2009 the only) EP, Over the Hills and Far Away.

The record also included guest performances by Tapio Wilska once again on "10th Man Down". Nightwish's version of "Over the Hills and Far Away" was well received by fans, becoming a frequent part of the band's live performances, but the other songs never broke through and have not been re-released, with the exception of a live performance of "10th Man Down" on the End of Innocence DVD with Marko Hietala. In the same year, they also released (as VHS, DVD and CD) their first live album, From Wishes to Eternity, recorded during a show in Tampere, Finland, on 29 December 2000.

Soon after the release of Over the Hills and Far Away, Nightwish met what has been described as one of hardest points of their career. The issues centered on the bassist, Sami Vänskä, who had started misbehaving towards the band, according to Holopainen, by missing appointments and failing to take concerts as seriously as the other members did. After the band discussed his behavior with Vänskä several times, without getting any change, everyone simply stopped caring and tensions grew. Meanwhile, guitarist Emppu Vuorinen had started complaining about his role in the band, feeling like "a hired gun who would only do what he's asked to". According to their music teacher, Plamen Dimov, he and Holopainen have totally different characters, and thus difficulties were expected to arise. But Vuorinen was told to stay cool and "bite the bullet", and the problem was never addressed again.

Later, Holopainen confessed that, at that time, he seriously started thinking about breaking Nightwish up. After a show in Russia, he sent a text message to fellow musician Tony Kakko of metal band Sonata Arctica, telling him that he did not think he had a band any longer, and asking him what plans he had for next year. After the Over the Hills and Far Away tour in 2001, Holopainen called their labels Drakkar and Spinefarm, unofficially declaring Nightwish was over. He told them he might produce another album, but he would never perform another show with the band. The same message was also written on the band's message board.

Straight after the last show of the tour, Holopainen went on a week-long hiking trip to Lapland with Tony Kakko, where they talked about the band, leading Holopainen to decide that he could not break Nightwish up that easily. When he returned from Lapland he immediately received a phone call from Ewo Pohjola, CEO of Spinefarm, offering to become their manager and help him straighten things up, and Holopainen agreed.

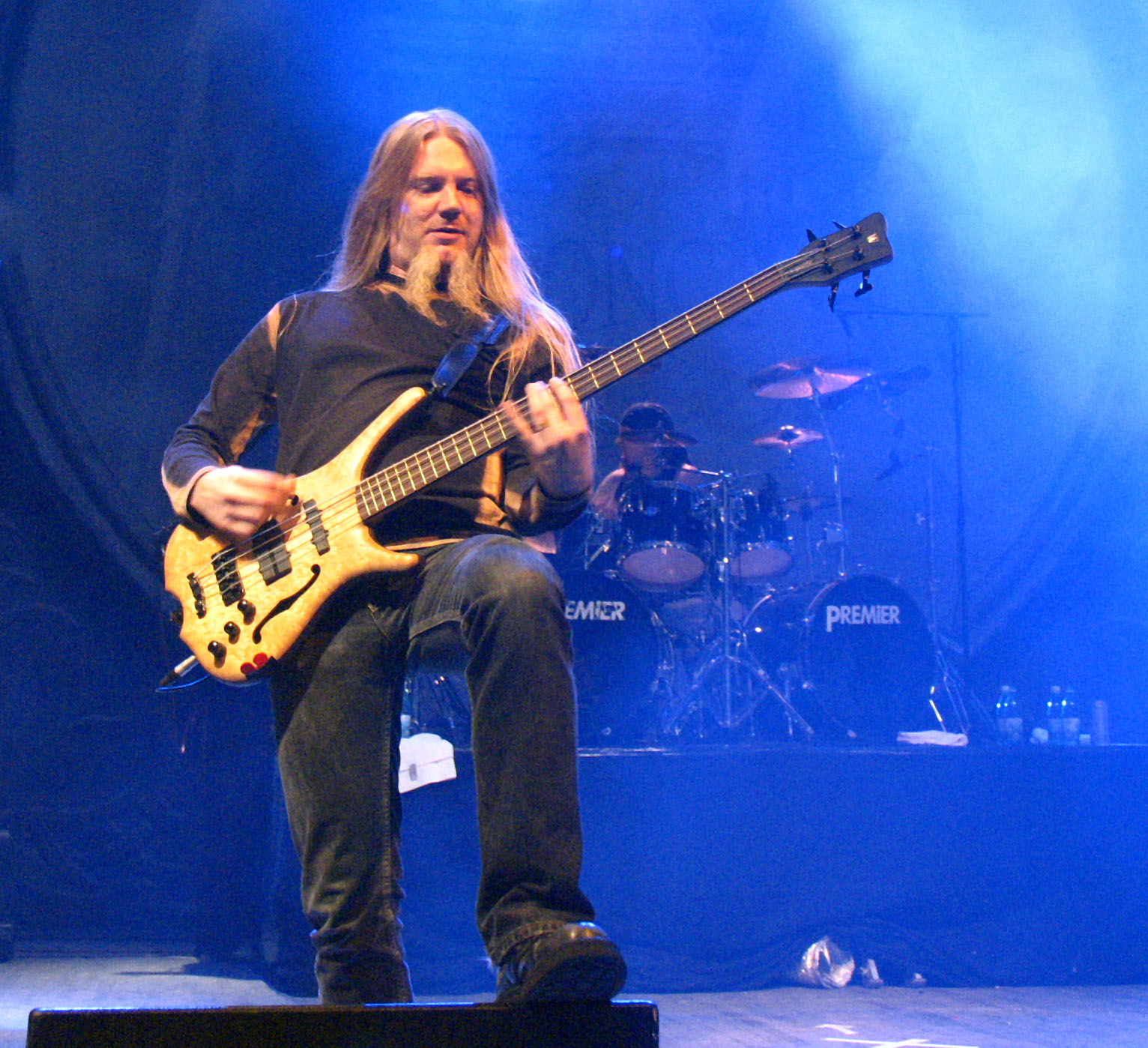
Former bassist and vocalist Marko Hietala

To continue with Nightwish, Holopainen decided some changes were in order. Beside choosing Ewo as their new manager, he also asked Vänskä to leave the band. He would later cite musical differences as another reason for the breakup. Marko Hietala (Tarot) was asked to replace Vänskä, and to effectively leave his current band, Sinergy. In addition to playing bass guitar, Hietala would also perform male vocals. Holopainen has since said publicly that he and Vänskä still keep in touch, contrary to rumours saying that they have not met since. However, they are not interested in making another project together.

In 2002, Nightwish released Century Child, along with the singles "Ever Dream" and "Bless the Child". Century Child was certified gold two hours after its release, and platinum two weeks afterwards. It set a record on the Finnish album charts of most distance between a first place album and the second place. A music video was filmed for "Bless the Child", with a second one filmed for "End of All Hope" later, without any single support. It contains clips from the Finnish movie Kohtalon kirja (English: The Book of Fate).

The main difference from previous albums is the use of a live Finnish orchestra on the tracks "Bless the Child", "Ever Dream", "Feel For You" and "The Beauty of the Beast". An enduring favorite of fans is the band's version of "The Phantom of the Opera", from the famous musical of the same name by composer Andrew Lloyd Webber. The song was routinely played in concerts until 21 October 2005, when vocalist Tarja Turunen was fired from the band and later replaced with Anette Olzon, whereupon the band announced that they would never play the song live again. This would hold true for 17 years until 27 and 28 November 2022, when Nightwish was joined by Dutch singer Henk Poort on stage at the Ziggo Dome in Amsterdam to perform the song.

In 2003, Nightwish released their second DVD, the documentary End of Innocence. It tells the story of the band in Holopainen, Nevalainen and Tapio Wilska's words for two hours. The documentary also features live performances and other exclusive footage. Vocalist Tarja Turunen got married during the summer of 2003, and there were rumours that the band was about to be dissolved. These rumors were, at the time, proven to be false, as the band continued to play concerts for another year and released another album. Tarja's marriage later played a part in her dismissal from the band in the autumn of 2005.

=== 2004–2005: Chart-topping success with Once and Turunen's dismissal ===
Nightwish – Nemo
Nightwish's style in this period made heavy use of Tarja's soprano lead against an orchestral background

Nightwish released their fifth album, Once, on 7 June 2004, along with its first single, "Nemo". The popularity of Evanescence in 2003 had piqued international and especially American interest in symphonic goth metal bands like Nightwish, Lacuna Coil, and Within Temptation. Consequently, Once sold triple platinum in Finland, platinum in Germany, and gold in 6 other countries; it also reached No. 1 in the Greek, Norwegian and German album charts, and charted the Top 10 in France, Hungary and Sweden. "Nemo" topped the charts in Finland and Hungary, and reached the charts in six additional countries. The following singles were: "Wish I Had an Angel" (featured on the soundtrack of the film Alone in the Dark), "Kuolema Tekee Taiteilijan" (released only in Finland and Japan) and "The Siren". Besides the commercial success, Once was also well received by critics, with many positive reviewers drawing comparisons with Oceanborn. "Nemo" remains the band's most successful single release to date.

Once utilizes a full orchestra in nine of the eleven songs on the album. Unlike for Century Child, Nightwish looked for an orchestra outside of Finland this time, choosing the London Philharmonic Orchestra. It is also their second album to feature a full-length song in Finnish, "Kuolema Tekee Taiteilijan" (English: "Death Makes an Artist").

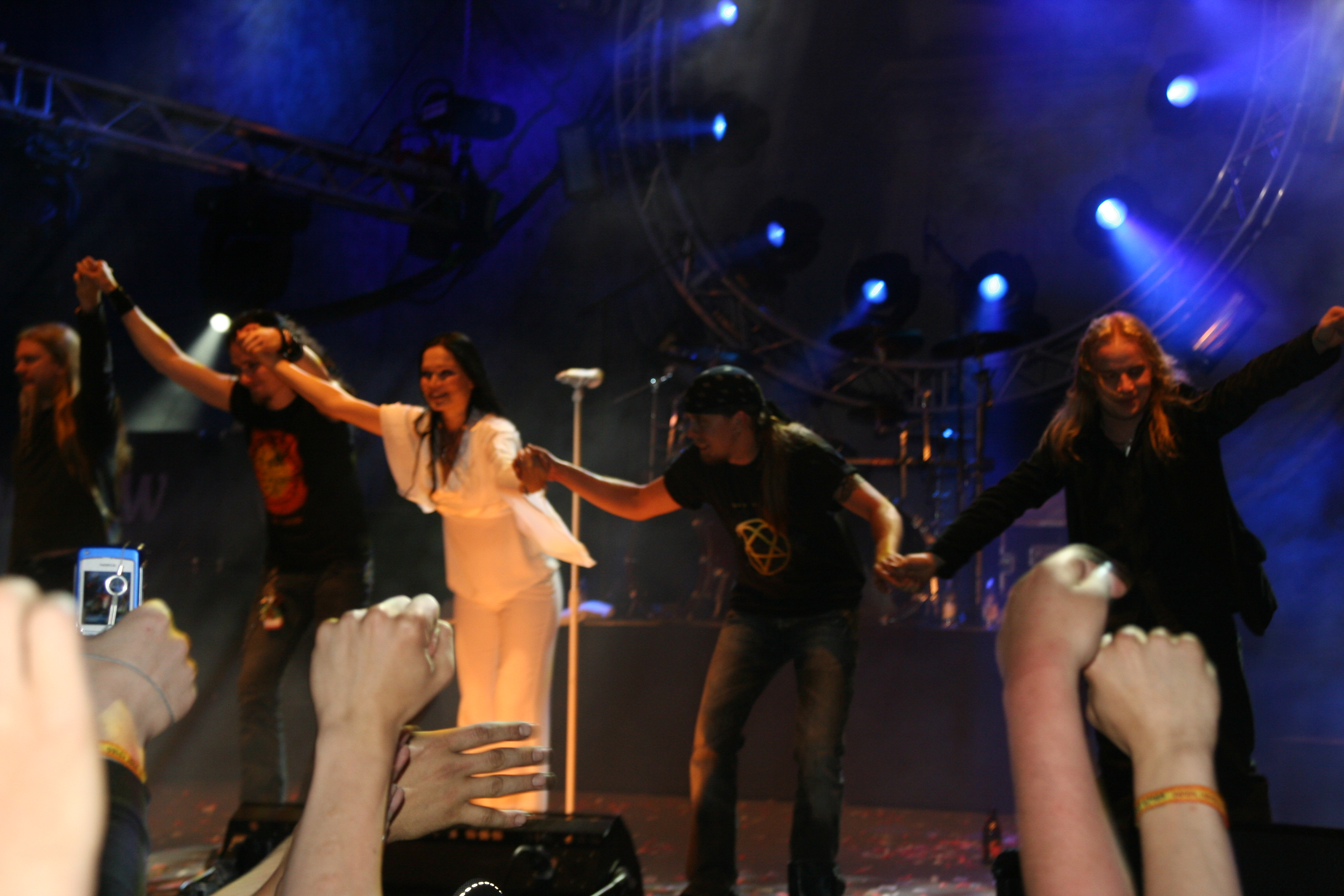
Nightwish live in Jämsä, Finland, on 25 June 2005

The production cost of Once totaled approximately 250,000 euros (over 1,000,000 including video production), making it Finland's most expensive recording in history. The band would go on to break this record again later in their career.

The success of the album allowed them to perform the Once Upon a Tour tour, in which the band played in many countries they had never visited before. Nightwish performed at the opening ceremony of the 2005 World Championships in Athletics, held in Helsinki, highlighting the acclaim the band had gained. A "best of" album, Highest Hopes, was released in September 2005. The compilation also featured a live cover "High Hopes" (from the Pink Floyd album The Division Bell). Besides "High Hopes", a remake of "Sleeping Sun" (from Oceanborn) was included on the album and released as a single. A video for the remake was shot, featuring a medieval battle, and can be found on the German release of the single and as a separate DVD released by Spinefarm.

The four other members of Nightwish had decided that it was best to continue Nightwish without Turunen. After a concert at the Hartwall Arena on 21 October 2005, they expressed their decision through a letter given to Turunen by Holopainen, and afterwards posted openly on the band's website. The letter was written by Holopainen and signed by all four band members. The main justification given for Turunen's dismissal was that the band felt that her husband, Marcelo Cabuli, and her own commercial interests had changed her attitude towards the band.

Turunen responded to the incident twice during press conferences in Finland and Germany, saying that her dismissal came as a shock to her; she had not been notified before the letter was given to her. The singer felt that the personal attacks on her husband were unwarranted, and that playing the issue out in public was "senselessly cruel". Turunen expressed these feelings through her own open letter, which was published on her personal website, and through various TV, magazine, and newspaper interviews.

=== 2006–2009: Arrival of Anette Olzon and Dark Passion Play ===
To find a replacement for Turunen as the female vocalist of the band, on 17 March 2006, the band allowed interested vocalists to send in demo tapes as an audition for the spot. During this time, speculation emerged about who would eventually be chosen and the band stated on their website that fans should not believe any source other than the band itself for information regarding the new vocalist. In the end, Alyson Avenue's ex-lead singer, 35-year-old Anette Olzon, from Sweden, was chosen.

In September 2006, the band entered the studio to record their sixth studio album, Dark Passion Play. In May, next year, Anette Olzon was announced to replace Turunen. Holopainen has said in interviews that he did not wish to reveal her identity until new material was available because he did not want fans judging her by nothing more than a picture, or past work. The day after this revealing, 25 May 2007, charity single "Eva" was released for download only as the first offering from the new album, and the first featuring Olzon. It was originally scheduled for release on 30 May, but the date was changed because of a leak on a British music download site. On 13 June, Nightwish revealed the title and artwork for the new album on their official website, as well as the name and cover of the second single (this time CD), "Amaranth"; it was released in Finland on 22 August and included a bonus track entitled "While Your Lips Are Still Red" written by Tuomas as the main theme for the upcoming Finnish feature film Lieksa!. The single achieved gold status in Finland after less than two days in stores.

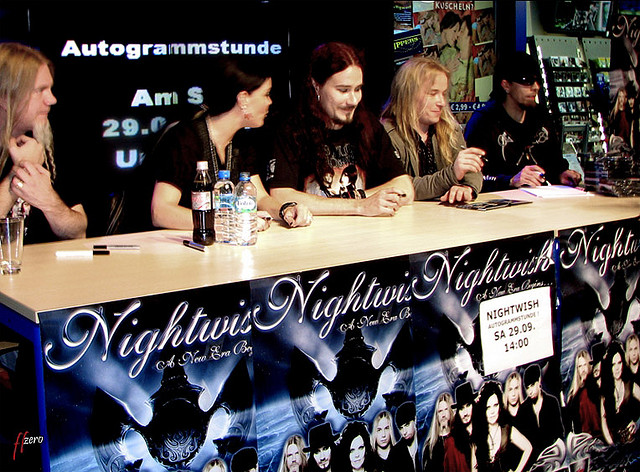
Nightwish at signing session in Hamburg, 2007

Dark Passion Play was released around Europe in the last week of September 2007, in the UK on 1 October and the United States on 2 October. It was awarded double platinum in Finland the second day after its release and took the number one position on the charts of Germany, Finland, Switzerland, Hungary and Croatia and got in top 100 in other 16 countries, including the United States.

Dark Passion Play broke the band's previous record for Finland's most expensive audio recording, with the final production cost coming in at over 500,000 euros (twice the cost of Once, the previous record-setter, and approximately $675,000).

On this album, male vocalist Marko Hietala had more freedom in the use of his voice: he sings backup on the songs "Cadence of Her Last Breath" and "Sahara", lead vocals on the songs "The Islander", "Master Passion Greed" and "While Your Lips Are Still Red" and chorus on the songs "Bye Bye Beautiful" and "7 Days to the Wolves". He also sings one part in "The Poet and the Pendulum", besides singing backup in the chorus. Before the band found the new singer and the album was recorded, Marko sang on all the demo versions. Holopainen also sang on the demo versions of "Bye Bye Beautiful" and "Master Passion Greed" but these songs have never been released.

On 22 September 2007, the band hosted a secret concert at Rock Café in Tallinn, Estonia, disguising itself as a Nightwish cover band called Nachtwasser. Their first official concert with Olzon was in Tel Aviv, Israel, on 6 October 2007. The Dark Passion Play tour thus started, visiting the United States, Canada, most of Europe, Asia, and Australia.

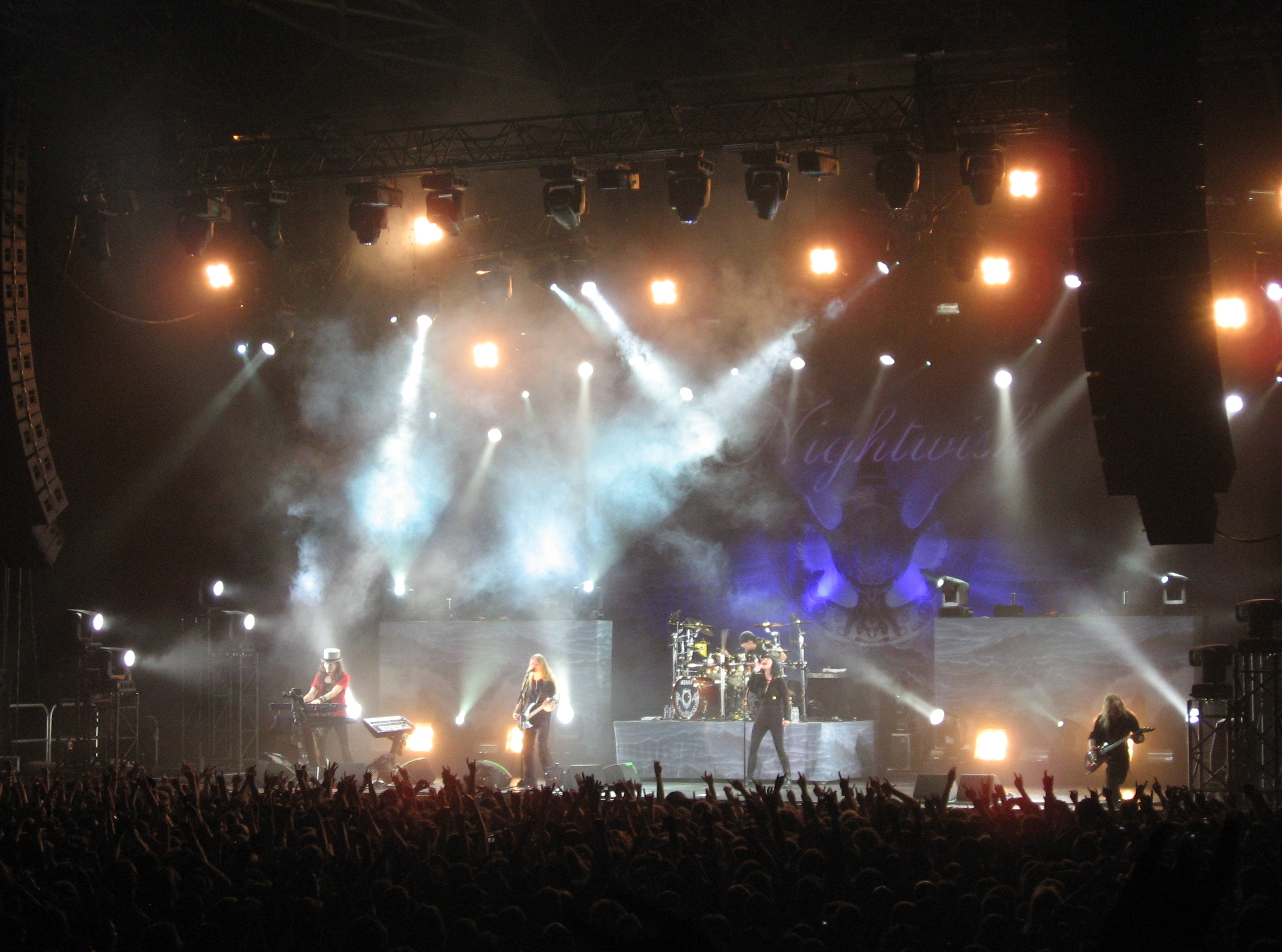
Nightwish live in Paris, France, on 6 April 2008

The third single of the album was "Erämaan viimeinen", a previously unreleased vocal version of the instrumental "Last of the Wilds". It was released in Finland only on 5 December 2007. On this song, Jonsu of the Finnish pop and rock band Indica performs the Finnish vocals. "Bye Bye Beautiful", the fourth single, was released on 15 February 2008, and concerns the 2005 dismissal of Turunen, as does one other song on the album ("Master Passion Greed"). The single includes yet another bonus track, "Escapist", which is also included on the Japanese version of Dark Passion Play. Within a week after the release, the fifth single was announced to be "The Islander". It was released over a month after the release of its music video, shot in late 2007 in Rovaniemi in Finnish Lapland.

The Dark Passion Play tour turned out to be Nightwish's longest tour yet, lasting from late 2007 to September 2009, when it ended with a concert in Hartwall Arena – the band's second concert there – with the band Apocalyptica.

On 6 March 2009, Nightwish released a new live EP/DVD entitled Made in Hong Kong (And in Various Other Places). The eight live tracks were recorded during the "Dark Passion Play World Tour" in 2007–2008, and the album also includes one B-side from the "Bye Bye Beautiful" single, one B-side from the "Amaranth" single, a previously unreleased demo version of "Cadence of Her Last Breath", and a bonus DVD with three music videos as well as a 37-minute documentary called Back in the Day is Now.

=== 2009–2012: Imaginaerum and Olzon's dismissal ===
In the June 2009 edition of the Finnish magazine Soundi, Holopainen stated that he had started work on a new Nightwish album. In October 2009, rumors about the new album's name were going around with the title Wind Embraced, but lead vocalist Anette Olzon listed the rumors as "not true" and said that the songs for the new album had not yet been completed apart from three songs written before May 2009. Holopainen said in a 2010 interview that "[...]I can't reveal to you any more but there is going to be a big twist so to say, on the next album." In an interview with Uilleann piper Troy Donockley (who recorded with the band on Dark Passion Play), when asked about his involvement in the new album, he stated "Oh yes, I will be playing on the next album and from what Tuomas has told me, it is going to be something extraordinary..."

On 1 February 2010, Olzon stated on her blog that Holopainen had nine songs ready for the new album. In April 2010, Holopainen revealed on the Nightwish homepage that he had finished writing the songs, and on 2 June, it was announced that he had finished recording the pre-production demo.

The band announced in late 2010 that more information on the album's actual content would be released in late January, but on 1 February, the official website bore a statement written by Holopainen that because of the schedule changes he can't yet give away as many details as he would have wanted, but more information will be out after a couple of months. He added, however, that "it still is the Burton-Gaiman-Dalí – amusement park we are about to enter". In the same statement, it was revealed that the album would be a theme album and "mood changes seem to be more present than ever before", and the orchestration demos he had received from Pip Williams were described as "beautiful, twisted, tribal and cinematic stuff". In the Finnish version of the statement, it was also revealed that a few songs will not get any orchestrations at all, differing from their latest album on which all songs had the background orchestra.

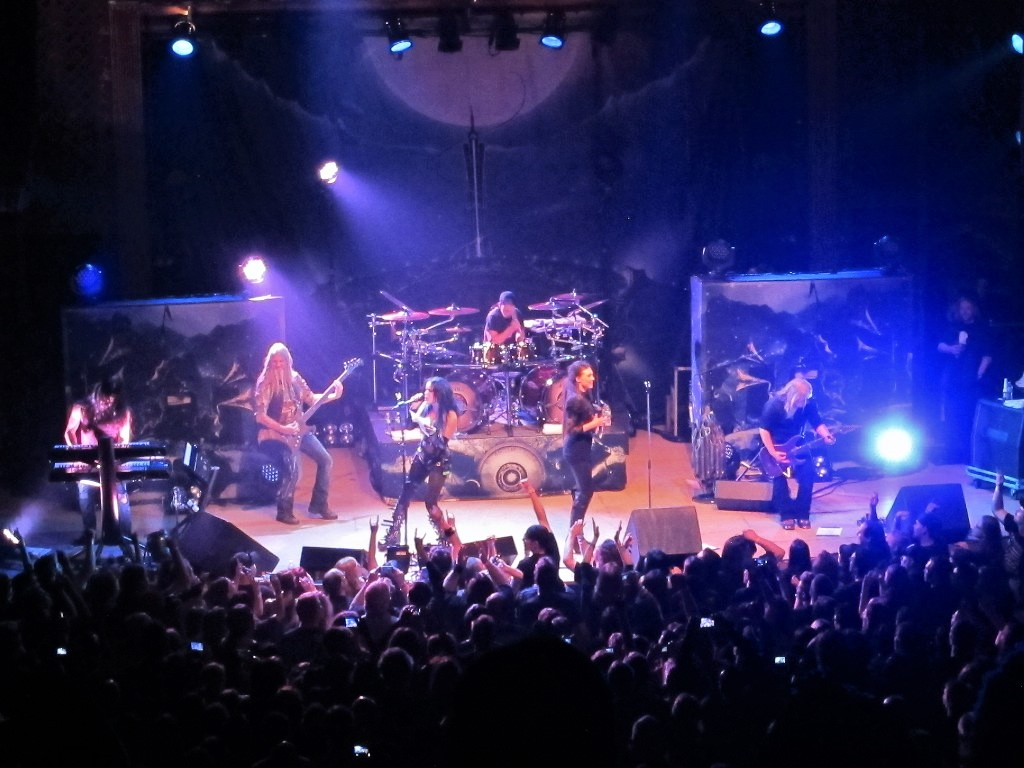
Nightwish performing in Denver, Colorado with Elize Ryd and Alissa White-Gluz, who filled in for Anette Olzon, who parted ways with the band afterwards

Announcements continued throughout 2011. On 10 February, Nightwish announced on their website that the new album title would be Imaginaerum. They also declared that the band had been preparing a movie based on the album, which would be released in 2012 and directed by Stobe Harju, who previously directed the music video for "The Islander". On 22 August 2011, the band's official website announced that the album of Imaginaerum would be released at the end of the year. On 31 August, Nightwish announced on its website a change in title, from Imaginarium to Imaginaerum, "to avoid mix-ups with various things named 'Imaginarium'". On 2 September, the group announced on its website that the new single, "Storytime", would be released on Friday, 11 November, and on 9 September, Nightwish revealed the cover and track list.

On 11 January 2012, Nightwish announced on its website that the second single, "The Crow, the Owl and the Dove", would be released on 29 February. Roadrunner Records announced that Nightwish would be releasing a 10-inch LP titled Trials of Imaginaerum in conjunction with Record Store Day (21 April 2012). The 10-inch LP is a two-sided picture disk that contains four early demos of "Storytime", "The Crow, The Owl and The Dove", "I Want My Tears Back" and "Slow, Love, Slow".

On 1 October 2012, Nightwish announced via its Facebook page that they were parting ways with Olzon. According to the press statement, "it has become increasingly obvious that the direction and the needs of the band were in conflict, and this has led to a division from which we cannot recover". This announcement came days after Olzon fell ill at a show in Denver, Colorado, and was unable to perform. Nightwish used replacement singers from the opening band, Kamelot, and Olzon later expressed her disappointment, saying "I was never asked if it was okay that they used Elize and Alissa in the show [Friday] night [...] I don't think it's a good decision they made and I'm sorry for those of you who came to see the whole band but got something else. But I was very ill and this decision wasn't mine." According to the statement, Dutch singer Floor Jansen (ex-After Forever, ReVamp) would sing for the remainder of the Imaginaerum World Tour.

On 11 January 2013, Olzon announced on her official blog that she was pregnant with her third child, due in spring 2013, which she claimed was a contributing factor to her being dismissed. The band then released a statement on its website counterclaiming that the reason Olzon gave for her dismissal and other statements she made were untrue and that Olzon herself had agreed to help find a replacement while she was on maternity leave. Later, Olzon gave several interviews in which she said she never agreed with a replacement, even when she was pregnant, and proposed to the band to postpone the tour, which culminated in her firing. She also added that she was against Jansen joining the band in her period of maternity, mainly because of the difference in their vocal styles.

In a 2015 interview, Holopainen said the band "emerged stronger" from the line-up changes it went through.

=== 2013–2018: Arrival of Floor Jansen and Troy Donockley with Endless Forms Most Beautiful ===
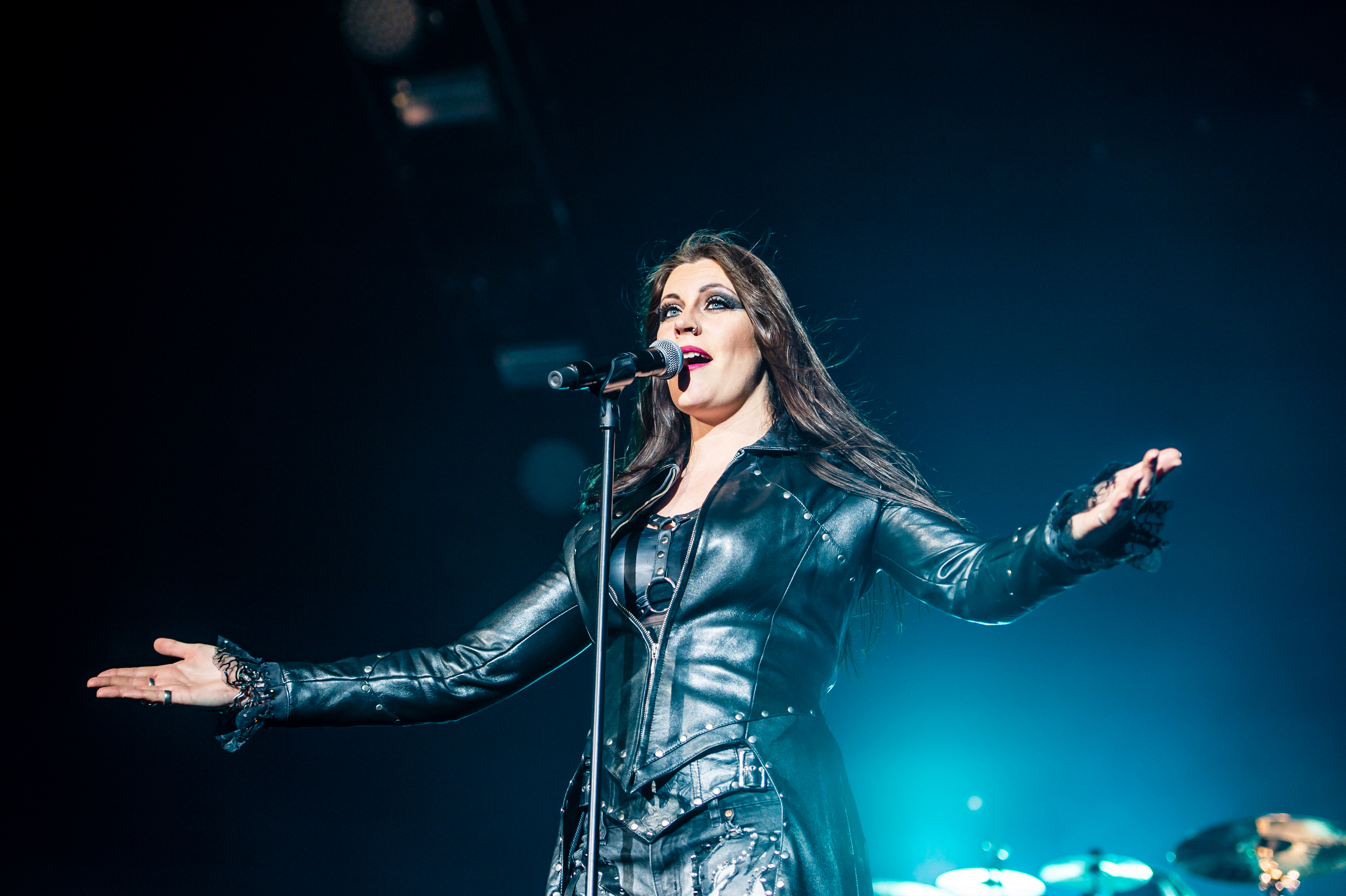
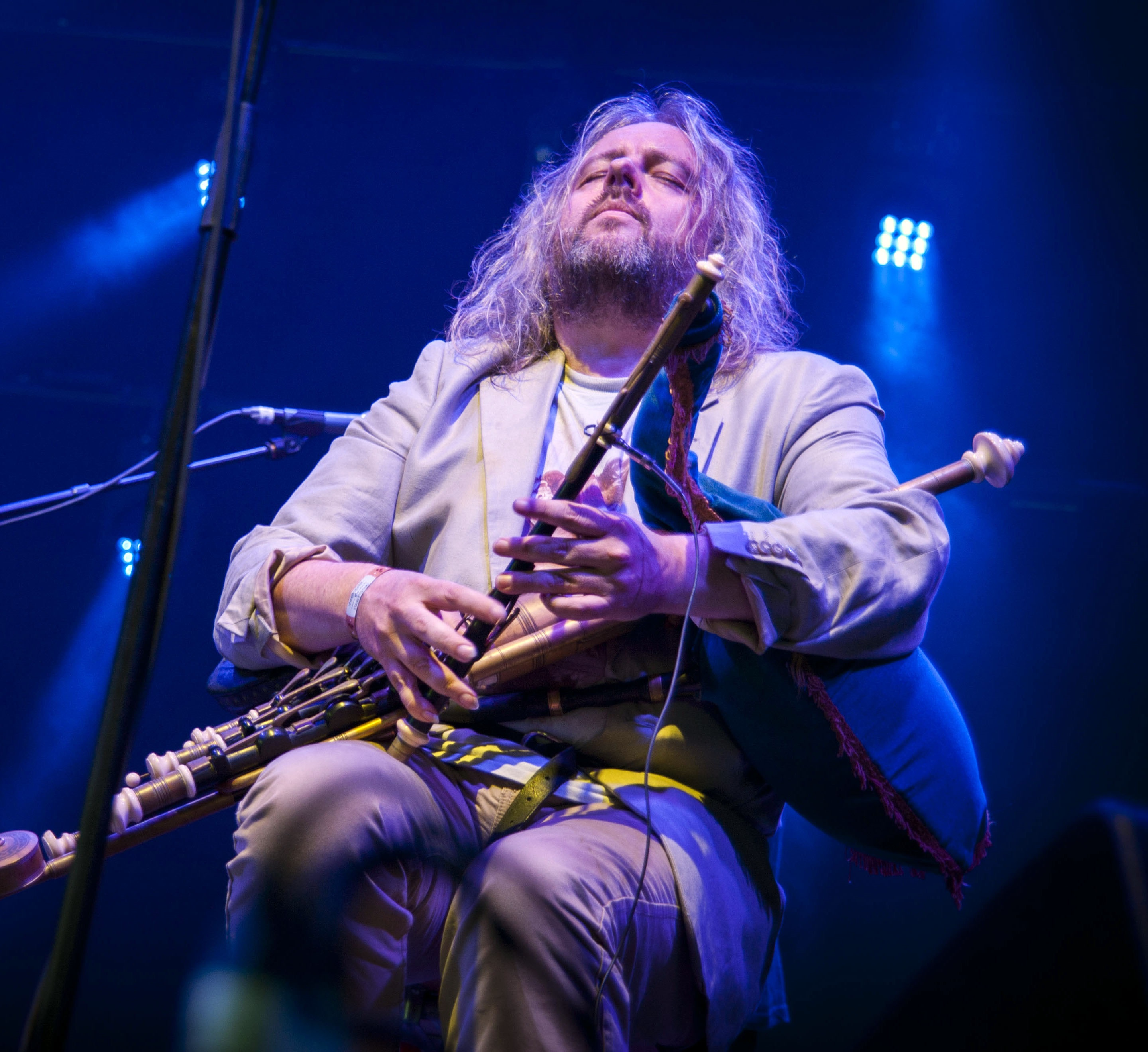
Floor Jansen (left) and Troy Donockley (right) were made official members in 2013, turning the band into a sextet for the first time.

In an interview with Metal Hammer in November 2012, Tuomas Holopainen stated that they already had a rehearsal place booked from July 2014 to September 2014, but before they began rehearsing the band members would be taking a break from Nightwish for several months.

The band performed at the Wacken Open Air music festival in August of 2013. On 9 October 2013, Nightwish announced Floor Jansen as the permanent replacement for Olzon. Troy Donockley was also announced as a full-time member, making the band a sextet for the first time. In a later interview, Tuomas said that Donockley's previous work with Nightwish had already made him "much a band member", so the band just "made it official". According to the band's webpage, the band would enter the studio in 2014 to record its eighth full-length album for a 2015 release. At that time, the band had already announced that it would contain Nightwish's longest song to date.

At the end of November, the band released the live album Showtime, Storytime. Despite the recording happening when they were only four members, it is the first Nightwish release to feature Jansen and to have her and Donockley credited as band members. The album also carries a documentary containing the behind-the-scenes of Jansen's first days in the band and the process of replacing Olzon.

In May 2014, Holopainen updated his official website, stating that he and producer Tero "TeeCee" Kinnunen had been recording 12 demos (and possibly three bonus tracks) for the new album in Hattula, Finland. The band expected to start rehearsing in July in Eno, Finland, to complete recording by January 2015, and to release the album in spring of that year, "If everything goes as scheduled". Commenting on the music, Tuomas said:

It's still too early to analyze the material more closely, but the album will once again explore all the ends of the spectrum, bringing the very best out of the newcomers Floor and Troy. And stealthily the album ended up having a theme running through it.

On 6 August, the band announced that founding member and drummer Jukka Nevalainen would not be part of the upcoming album due to his debilitating insomnia. Kai Hahto (Wintersun) would be taking his place on the album and the upcoming tour.

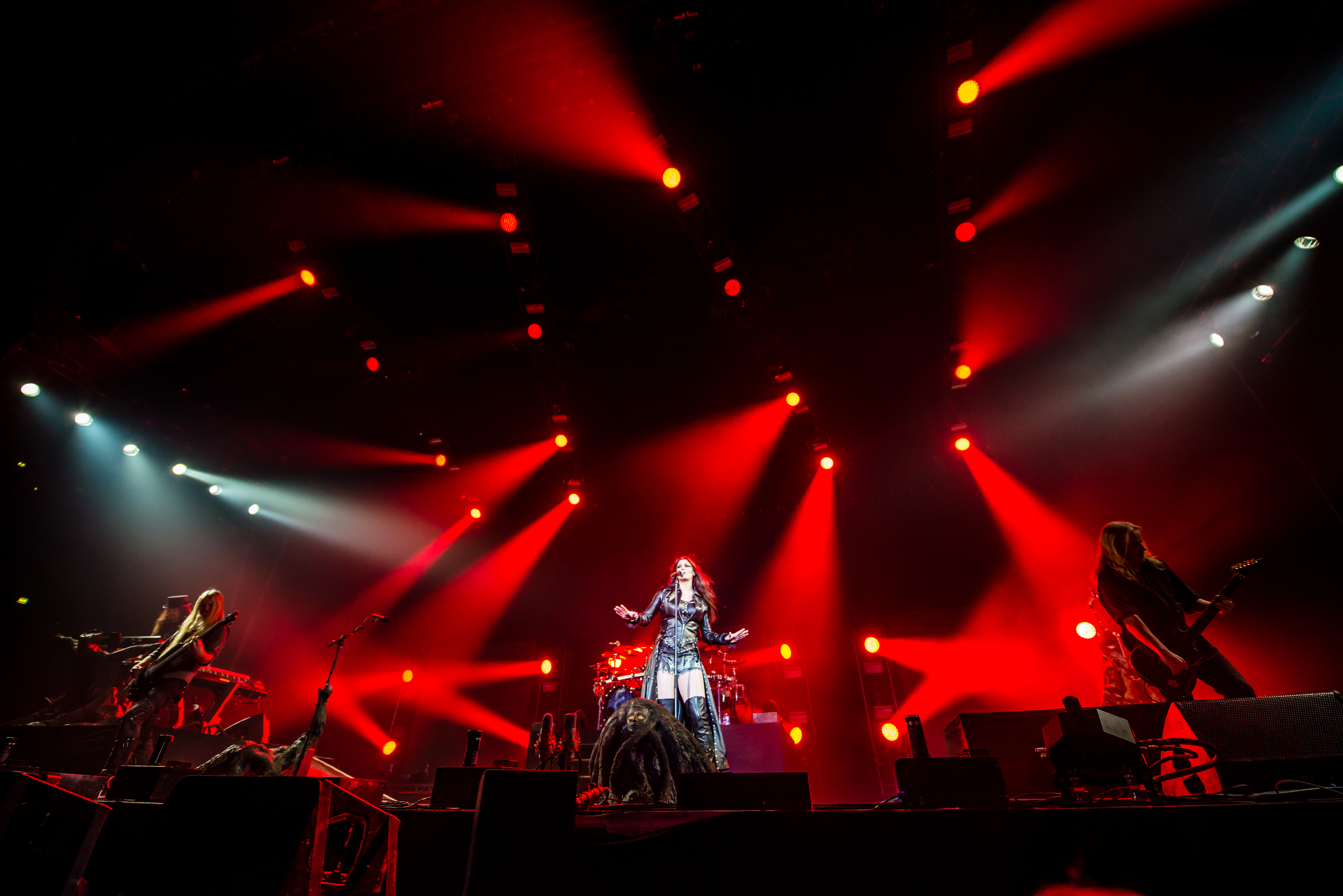
Nightwish performing in Oberhausen, Germany, in November 2015

Evolutionary biologist and author Richard Dawkins was announced as a guest star on the album, with Holopainen stating that he had "been so enthusiastic about this kind of literature for the past few months, and will be for the upcoming months, that it's going to come out somehow."

In November, the band filmed a music video for "Élan", one of the tracks of the album. On 8 December, the band announced that it would be the first single from the album, which would be released on 13 February 2015.

The new album's cover art and its title, Endless Forms Most Beautiful, were revealed on 22 December, and the album was released on 27 March 2015, produced by Tero "TeeCee" Kinnunen. The title for Endless Forms Most Beautiful was taken from the writings of English naturalist Charles Darwin. The album features the participation of London's The Metro Voices choir group, London's Young Musicians Children's Choir, and the Orchestre De Grandeur, led by the esteemed orchestral arranger Pip Williams, who teaches music and music technology at the London College of Music. Professor Richard Dawkins not only narrates the introduction to the album's opener, "Shudder Before the Beautiful", but also the album's closer, "The Greatest Show on Earth", which takes its name from his 2009 book on evolution. To promote the album's release, the band went on the Endless Forms Most Beautiful World Tour, which started on 9 April 2015, in New York City and concluded on 9 October 2016, in Saitama, Japan.

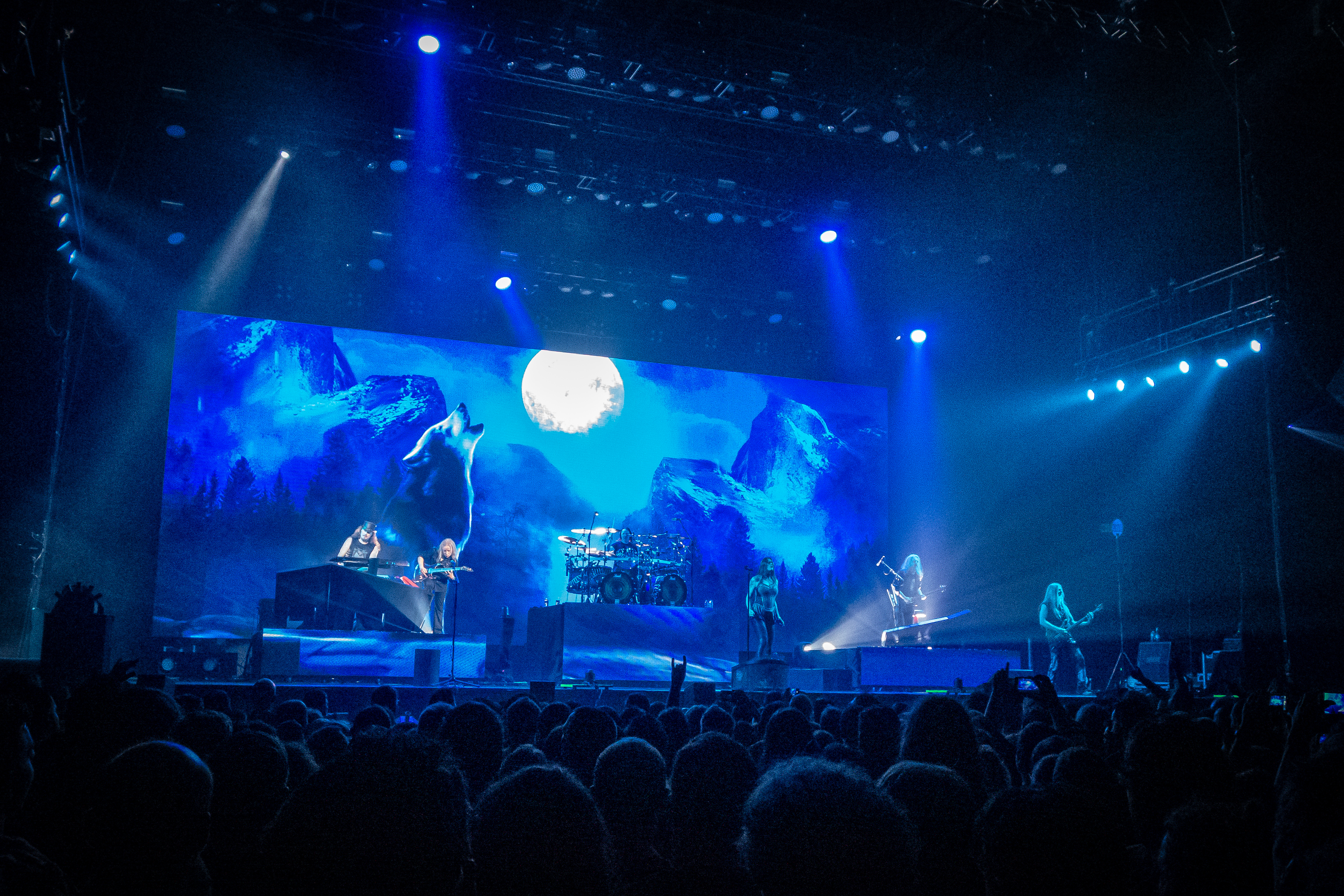
Nightwish live at the SEG Geneva Arena in 2018

In July 2015, it was announced that Sonata Arctica's vocalist Tony Kakko would replace Jukka Nevalainen as the band's special guest at the 2015 edition of Rock in Rio. In December 2015, Nightwish became the first Finnish band to headline a show at the Wembley Arena, in London. The sold-out show featured guest performer Richard Dawkins, who spoke his parts on stage. The Tampere and London shows were filmed for a live album release known as Vehicle of Spirit.

On 20 August 2016, the band played a special 20th-anniversary show at Himos Areena in Finland. The show featured original bassist Sami Vänskä on the song "Stargazers" and drummer Jukka Nevalainen on the song "Last Ride of the Day". The band took a break in 2017, during which Jansen was focusing on her first child. Holopainen said that the band would continue between the years of 2018 and 2020, with another album that would continue the themes explored in Endless Forms Most Beautiful.

On 9 June 2017, the band announced that 9 March 2018 would mark not only the debut of a nine-month world tour titled Decades: World Tour, which had concluded in December that same year, but also the release of a new compilation album, titled Decades. The tour featured "rarely heard material" and a special set for fans. During the Latin American leg of the tour, the Buenos Aires show was filmed for a live DVD known as Decades: Live in Buenos Aires which was released on 6 December 2019.

=== 2019–2023: Further lineup changes and Human. :II: Nature. ===
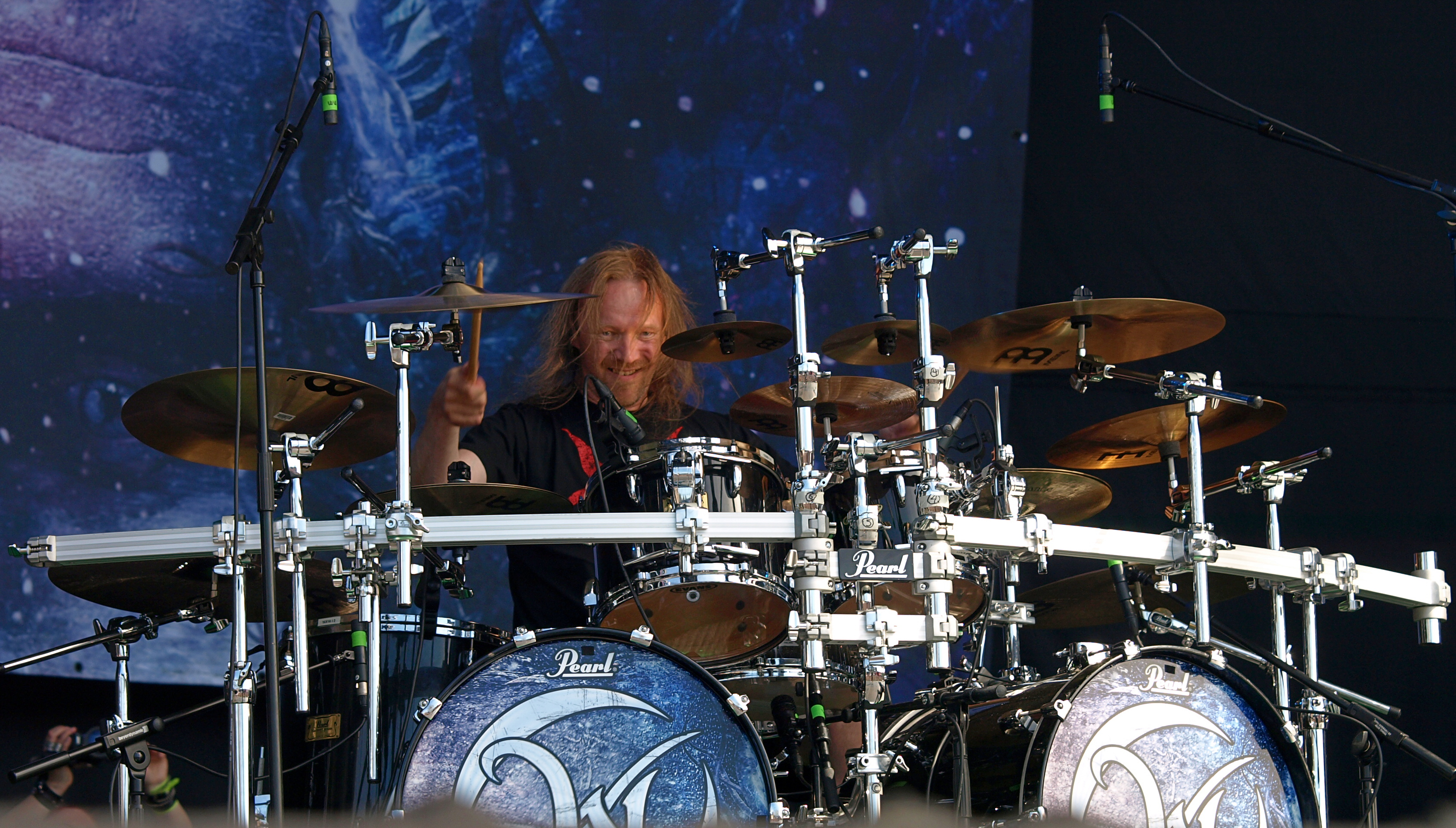
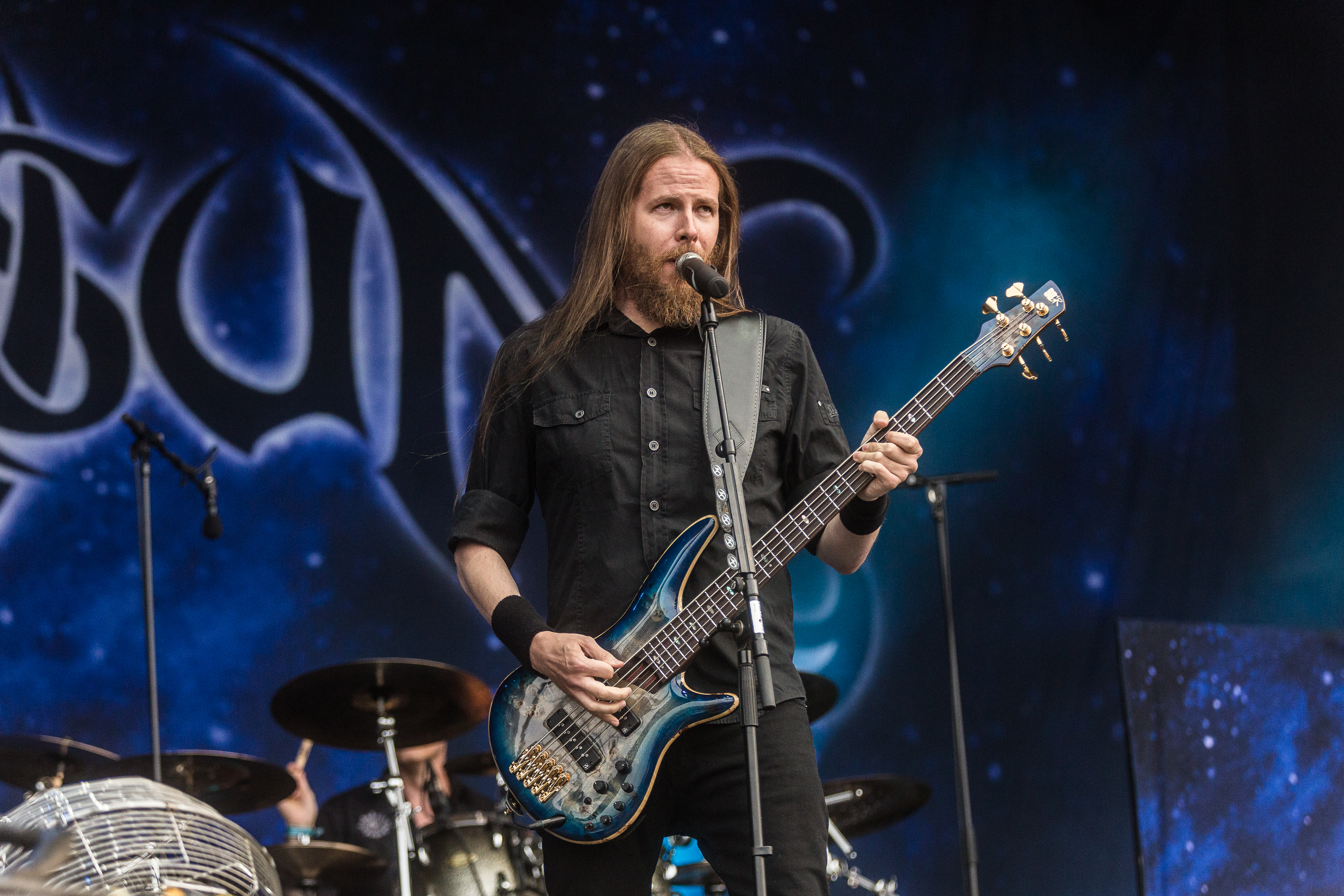
(Left): Kai Hahto was made an official member in July 2019; (right): Jukka Koskinen joined the band as an official member in August 2022.

In July 2018, Holopainen stated that he had written "80 or 90%" of the material for Nightwish's next album, which would consist of ten or eleven songs. He stated that the inspiration for the new album came from the completion of the 2018 self-titled debut album of Auri, a band he created with Donockley and Johanna Kurkela the previous year. Recording would start in July 2019, with a planned spring 2020 release. The band would "use the [orchestral] instrumentation in a different way than before", with Holopainen stating, "You want to search for some new ways of using it so that it doesn't end up sounding the same as before". Jansen stated in November that she believed the recording process would be similar to Endless Forms Most Beautiful's, for which the band went through lengthy rehearsals before starting to record.

On 15 July 2019, the band announced that Kai Hahto would permanently take over for Jukka Nevalainen as the band's drummer. In a statement, Nevalainen explained that while he was managing his insomnia well and having few issues, he did not want to 'push his luck' by returning to the band as a full-time member. He did confirm, however, that he would continue to take care of band-related business behind the scenes.

On 31 October 2019, Floor Jansen confirmed that recording for the new album had been completed. On 18 December 2019, it was confirmed that Tuomas Holopainen was at Finnvox Studios mixing Nightwish's next studio album, set for release in the first quarter of 2020. Holopainen confirmed on 10 January 2020 that mixing and mastering for the album had finished and it was ready for release, with the album title and other details to be released soon.

The new album's cover and track list, along with its title, Human. :II: Nature., were revealed on 16 January 2020, and the album was released on 10 April 2020. The first single of the album, titled "Noise" was released on 7 February 2020, with an accompanying music video. The second single from the album, "Harvest", was released on 6 March 2020, with a lyric video to accompany its release. On the day the album was released, Nightwish released lyric videos for all of the songs on the album. The album debuted in the top 10 charts as number one in Finland, Spain, Switzerland and Germany, as well as being charted in other countries including Canada, Austria, Hungary, Poland and the United States.

Nightwish announced on 11 March 2020 that they had joined a partnership with an international conservation charity organization named World Land Trust. With their announcement was a video that promoted the organization, which in turn features the song "Ad Astra" from their ninth album. When asked about the partnership with the organization in an interview, Floor commented:

They're a great organisation. The video for the last song on the album, 'Ad Astra', was filmed in conjunction with them. They work to preserve our planet by buying up areas of land and preserving them. I think it's hypocritical that we're telling Brazil that they need to save their rainforest when Europeans have absolutely decimated their own. But at the same time, we really do need to save the rainforest or we're facing a climate crisis. The World Land Trust works with governments to find alternative financial outlets for local people to stop logging and deforestation. You can't just say to people, 'Stop doing this'. You need to consider the human impact, then the environmental one.

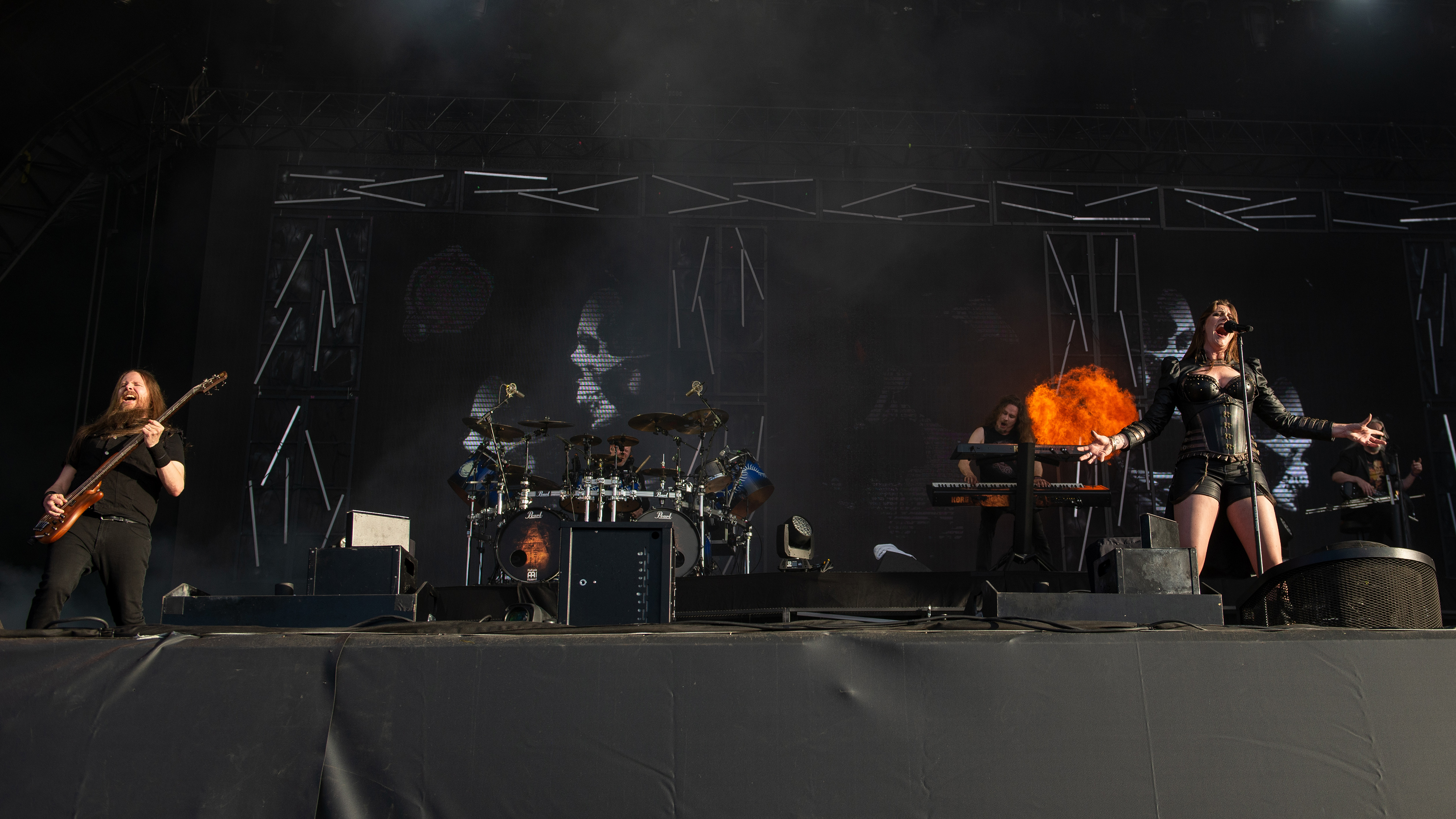
Nightwish live at Hellfest in June 2022

On 10 July 2020, a new crab species, the Tanidromites nightwishorum, which was discovered by curator of palaeontology Dr. Adiel A. Klompmaker of the Alabama Museum of Natural History, was named in honor of the band, in particular for their 2015 album Endless Forms Most Beautiful. On 12 August 2020, a prehistoric rockshelter called the Alpenglow Rockshelter, that was discovered in Pennsylvania, USA was, too, named for Nightwish, particularly in honor of their ninth track, Alpenglow, from their 2015 album.

On 12 January 2021, Marko Hietala announced his departure from the band, citing his struggles with chronic depression and his disillusionment with the music scene in general. The band released another statement, that a temporary member would fill in on bass for the tour. In his statement, Hietala wrote:

Conspiracy is the word of the day. For the people who like them I need to say that my 55th birthday is now on 14th of Jan and I’ve certainly done my time for now. Blaming for instance Tuomas is an insult to both him and my free thinking. This is a very sad thing to all of us too. Have a care please. [...] There are a couple of things agreed on that I will do on 2021. Otherwise I kindly and with respect ask the media, bands, artists projects etc. to not ask me for anything within the next year. I have some reinventing to do. I hope to tell you about it on 2022. It's not a promise though. I am so sorry about this.

The band began their world tour in support of the album in May 2021 with an interactive livestream experience in a virtual reality tavern which featured songs from the album, as well as revealed the identity of the session bass player, Jukka Koskinen, via VIP virtual session. Both performances broke records with the first drawing 150,000 viewers and setting it as the most viewed virtual performance in Finland, with the box office exceeding one million in euros. The virtual performances were released on DVD on 11 March 2022. The band resumed their tour in Finland in late July 2021 with a "secret" performance in Oulu. The tour was originally scheduled to begin in spring 2020, but due to the COVID-19 pandemic, the band postponed the tour to the next year. The tour concluded in June 2023.

On 21 January 2021, the band were nominated by the Finnish Emma Awards for the categories of Album of the Year, Band of the Year and Viewer's Choice of the Year, winning the category of Metal Album of the Year. The awards ceremony in which they were nominated was held on 14 May 2021, at the Hartwall Arena in Helsinki.

Following a number of summer festivals in Europe, the band announced the addition of Jukka Koskinen as the band's permanent bass player on 21 August 2022.

=== 2023–2026: Yesterwynde and touring hiatus ===
In April 2021, Holopainen had said in an interview that he started sketching drafts for the next Nightwish album. He stated in May 2021 that he had been working on new material for "the past month or two" while he was busy with his side projects Auri and the reunited Darkwoods My Betrothed in which he became a full-time member. He confirmed that the band booked a studio for the next album, which would happen in the summer of 2023 for three months at the Röskö campsite. On 2 March 2022, it was confirmed that Holopainen was in the studio, writing demos for the next Nightwish album, which were finished in June 2022.

Jansen, who was at the time working on her debut solo album, Paragon, stated on 10 June 2022 that the sound of the new album would be heavier, but would retain the band's sound, while she also kept the concept for the album a secret. Holopainen confirmed in an interview before the band's performance at Knotfest in Turku, Finland on 12 August 2022, that the band had listened to the demos. Holopainen later confirmed that the next album would be both a follow-up to Human. :II: Nature. and the third and final part of a trilogy which started with Endless Forms Most Beautiful, as well as stating that the album would come out around early 2024. The band began recording for their tenth studio album in August 2023 following the completion of the demos. After the recording was finished, mixing and mastering for the album began in January 2024, and was completed at the end of February. The band renewed a multi-album deal with Nuclear Blast in March 2024.

The name of the tenth studio album, Yesterwynde, was announced on 30 April 2024, and the album was released on 20 September 2024. Prior to the album's release, three singles were released in support of the album: "Perfume of the Timeless", "The Day of...", and "An Ocean of Strange Islands".

There was no touring cycle in support of the album, as the band had issued a statement on 6 April 2023 that they would be going on a hiatus from touring for two to three years following the album's release. Donockley stated the reason behind the touring hiatus in a September 2024 interview, citing personal reasons and the dangers of burning out. In the same interview, he did not rule out the band performing some shows in 2027 for the band's 30th anniversary. During the touring hiatus, Holopainen and Donockley's side project Auri toured for the first time in Finland in August 2025, later expanding out to touring throughout Europe in September and October. Jansen confirmed on 11 May 2025 that she began working on her second solo album during the band's touring hiatus.

=== 2026: Jansen's departure and upcoming eleventh studio album ===
In March 2026, Holopainen stated that he was composing two new albums, but did not specify if one of the albums were for Nightwish. In August 2026, a few days after Jansen had stated that there was nothing planned for the band, Holopainen confirmed that he had six songs written for the next album, and hinted at the band returning to live performances in 2028, confirming simultaneously the band would enter the studio in May 2027 to record their next album.

On 15 October 2026, Nightwish announced they had parted ways with Jansen by mutual agreement. In the announcement, the band also affirmed their plans to continue and enter the studio in 2027 to record the upcoming studio album.

== Music ==
=== Musical style ===
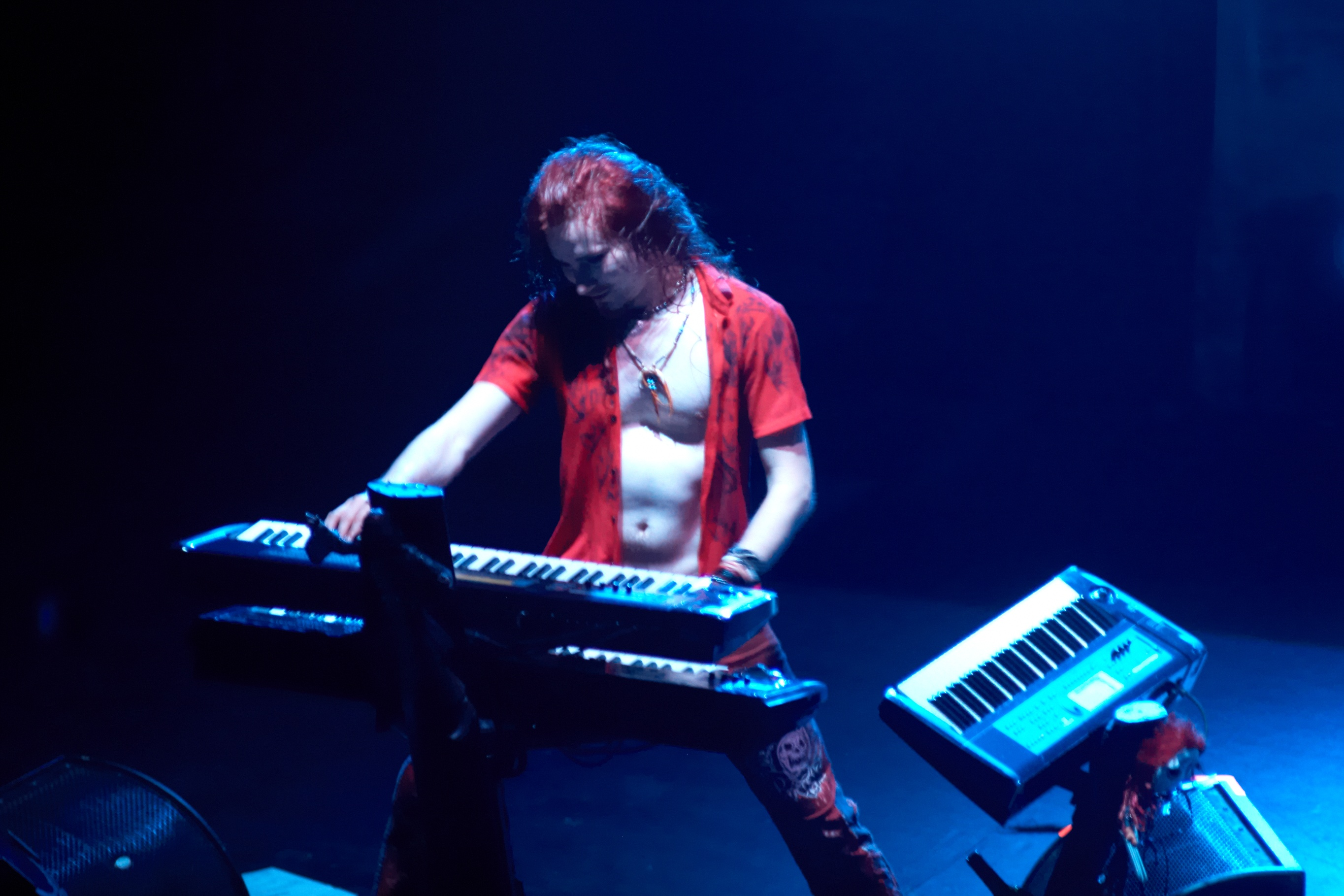
The use of keyboards is an important part of Nightwish's original music.

Nightwish performs goth-influenced symphonic metal with female vocals. Their music has been also described as symphonic gothic metal which mixes metal, opera, weepy power ballads, and keyboard solos. Although the combination of operatic vocals and melodic heavy metal made Nightwish famous, they don't employ operatic vocals as much as they used to. On the ninth studio album, Human. :II: Nature., "Shoemaker" was the only song with an operatic vocal after Tarja Turunen's departure. They have also been known to play power metal, progressive metal, folk metal and gothic metal. (Note: Musical styles: "power metal"; "progressive metal"; "folk metal"; "gothic metal")

The band's music is known to be complex and layered. Their approach is epic, theatrical and operatic. Critic Steve Huey notes "their rich melodicism, dynamic textures, and theatrical approach to performance make them a unique musical entity".

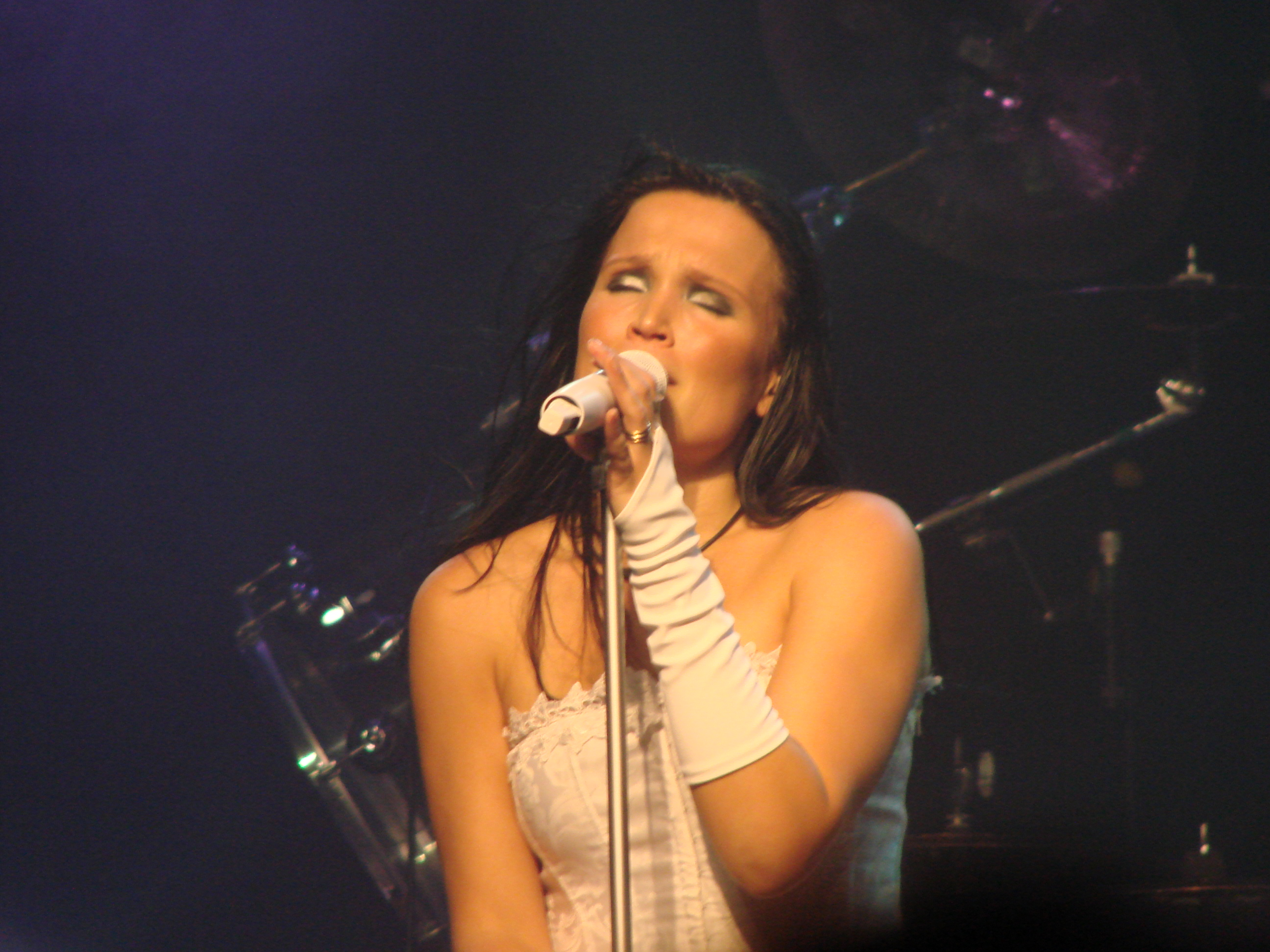
A part of Nightwish's original sound was the soprano vocals of Tarja Turunen, until her dismissal from the band in 2005.

The usage of a female vocalist has become a sort of trademark, though less so since the outbreak of new female-fronted metal bands in the mid-2000s with the popularization of bands such as Evanescence and Within Temptation as well as several gothic metal bands mixing female and male vocals, such as Lacuna Coil, The Gathering, Tristania, Epica and After Forever.

Former bassist and vocalist Marko Hietala describes the style of the band's music as "melodic symphonic metal;" though this is not a view shared by all members of the group, including band composer Tuomas Holopainen, who describes the band as simply symphonic metal. Some critics find that the band had a gothic sound since their debut. The music of Nightwish had been "distinguished by the operatic voice" of soprano Tarja Turunen, a "charismatic frontwoman with a powerful voice". Critics observed that her vocals became less operatic with the release of Once. Following the departure of Tarja Turunen from the group, Nightwish left behind the "signature operatic vocals" of their earlier albums, though the band somewhat reintroduced this style when Floor Jansen became lead singer.

While the music of Nightwish is centered on a female lead singer, the band has also featured some male vocals on their albums ever since their debut release, Angels Fall First. This debut album also included "elements of folk music and ambience" that were discarded on their subsequent album, Oceanborn. However, the song "Creek Mary's Blood" from the album Once featured some use of folk-oriented Native American melodies, and their 2007 release Dark Passion Play featured folk music elements on the songs "The Islander" and "Last of the Wilds".

=== Lyrical themes ===
In the beginning, Holopainen mainly wrote about mythological and fantasy themes, and often used references to "metaphysics and nature". Fantasy novels especially are a big influence on Nightwish's lyrics. Songs such as "Wishmaster," "Elvenpath," and "Wanderlust" make fairly clear references to fantasy novels, in this case the Dragonlance series and J. R. R. Tolkien's The Lord of the Rings. "FantasMic" from Wishmaster is a direct tribute to Walt Disney and Disney animated films, which Holopainen has said are among his influences. Dark Passion Play featured the return to the fantasy theme with songs such as "Sahara", "Whoever Brings the Night" and "7 Days to the Wolves", which is loosely based on Stephen King's novel Wolves of the Calla, the fifth book in the Dark Tower series. The song "The Poet and the Pendulum's" first section is called "The White Lands of Empathica", which is a reference to the seventh book in the Dark Tower series.

Over the years, the lyrics became more personal. "Dead Boy's Poem" from Wishmaster is an emotional piece, which Holopainen calls his "legacy and [...] testament for the whole world. [...] I wanted to do this song before I die because I wanted to tell the whole world what I think and feel. It expresses a lot of myself." The personal development became even more obvious on the Wishmaster successor Century Child. Turunen thinks that the lyrics no longer deal "with the dreamland we were used to, but with the brutal reality of life."

"Kuolema Tekee Taiteilijan" (in English, "Death Makes an Artist") from Once describes the experience of loss and its impact on art, "Nemo" deals with the feeling of being lost, and "Dead Gardens" deals with a bout of writer's block Holopainen suffered. "Creek Mary's Blood" is based on Dee Brown's story of the same name, which presents the situation of Native Americans at the end of the 19th century.

2007's Dark Passion Play included an unusual number of personal songs, including "The Poet and the Pendulum", which has been described as Holopainen's life story, and about being a composer and musician. "Meadows of Heaven" is a depiction of Holopainen's childhood and the feeling that it'll never return. "Bye Bye Beautiful" and "Master Passion Greed" are about ex-member Tarja Turunen and her husband Marcelo Cabuli. "Cadence of Her Last Breath" is a "very personal song" about running away. The album also contains many references to authors such as Edgar Allan Poe and Walt Whitman.

Imaginaerum has different lyrical themes. For example, the song "Ghost River" is about "a duel between the Devil and Mother Gaia", while "Scaretale" concerns "childhood nightmares and monsters".

On Endless Forms Most Beautiful, lyrical themes included the beauty of the world and everything it has to offer ("Shudder Before The Beautiful"), criticism about how some religions restrict people's lives ("Weak Fantasy"), and the meaning of life, which can be something different for all of us ("Élan"). The first disc of Human. :II: Nature. continues the theme of Nightwish's previous album, with the album's theme being based on human nature and how they are as a species, with songs about modern society ("Noise"), life ("Harvest"), the human imagination ("Pan"), and an ode to human empathy ("How's the Heart?"). Yesterwynde, the tenth studio album, continues the themes on the previous two studio albums: time, humanism and history.

Although the lyrics of Nightwish generally are serious with dark meanings, they have also produced several less serious songs, including the bonus track "Nightquest", which talks about the band members' (the three original members as well as Nevalainen) connection as musicians, and the "quest" of Nightwish.

=== Language ===
Nightwish mainly writes songs in English, though a few are in Finnish: one song on band's debut album, Angels Fall First (1997); "Kuolema tekee taiteilijan", from the Once album (2004); the single "Erämaan viimeinen" (2007), which is a vocal version of the instrumental "Last of the Wilds"; and "Taikatalvi" ("Magic Winter"), from Imaginaerum (2011). Holopainen was very uncertain about the lyrics of "Erämaan viimeinen", because he thinks that writing in Finnish is rather hard, and has said that "Finnish [could] quickly sound really cheesy."

=== Influence ===
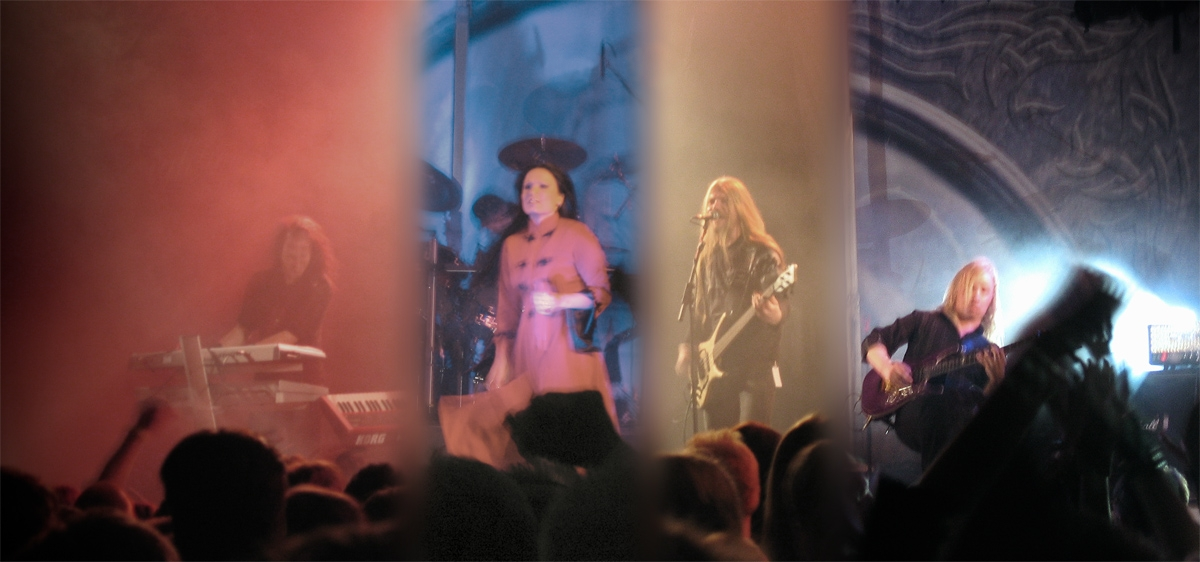
Nightwish live in 2004. Band members from the left: Keyboardist Tuomas Holopainen, lead vocalist Tarja Turunen, bassist Marko Hietala, guitarist Emppu Vuorinen.

Tuomas Holopainen, writer of most of the band's lyrics and music, says that he gets most of the inspiration for Nightwish's songs from film music. Songs like "Beauty of the Beast" (from Century Child), "Ghost Love Score" (from Once) and "The Poet and the Pendulum" (from Dark Passion Play) are examples of this influence. Holopainen has also said that film music is the music he listens to for leisure. He likes, for example, the musical scores to The Village, Van Helsing, The Chronicles of Narnia: The Lion, the Witch and the Wardrobe and Crimson Tide, and practically everything written by Hans Zimmer. Other songs, such as "Bye Bye Beautiful" (from Dark Passion Play), and "Wish I Had an Angel" (from Once) have elements of industrial metal, and some others, like "The Islander" and "Last of the Wilds" (from Dark Passion Play), "Creek Mary's Blood" (from Once), and the Angels Fall First album have elements of folk music. Bands stated as an influence on Nightwish include Children of Bodom, Theatre of Tragedy, The Gathering, My Dying Bride, Tiamat and The 3rd and the Mortal.

Nightwish has also been noted as a source of inspiration for other bands. Simone Simons, lead singer of the Dutch symphonic metal band Epica, stated that she began singing in a classical style because of Nightwish's 1998 album, Oceanborn. Sander Gommans of After Forever said that Nightwish "will certainly influence us in creating new songs". Power metal band Sonata Arctica's lead singer Tony Kakko has explained how much of an influence Nightwish is to him. In December 2015, Metal Hammer's Dave Everley described them as "mainland Europe's most successful metal band, give or take a Rammstein".

== Band members ==
Current

- Tuomas Holopainen – keyboards (1996–present), male vocals (1996–1998)
- Emppu Vuorinen – lead guitar (1996–present), bass (1997–1998)
- Troy Donockley – uilleann pipes, whistles, rhythm guitar, male vocals (2013–present) (Note: Session and touring musician from 2007 to 2013.)
- Kai Hahto – drums, percussion (2019–present) (Note: Session and touring musician from 2014 to 2019.)
- Jukka Koskinen – bass (2022–present) (Note: Touring musician from 2021 to 2022.)

== Discography ==
- Angels Fall First (1997)
- Oceanborn (1998)
- Wishmaster (2000)
- Century Child (2002)
- Once (2004)
- Dark Passion Play (2007)
- Imaginaerum (2011)
- Endless Forms Most Beautiful (2015)
- Human. :II: Nature. (2020)
- Yesterwynde (2024)

== Concert tours ==
- The First Tour of the Angels (1997–1998)
- Summer of Wilderness (1999)
- Oceanborn Europe Tour (1999)
- Wishmaster World Tour (2000–2001)
- World Tour of the Century (2002–2003)
- Once Upon a Tour (2004–2005)
- Dark Passion Play World Tour (2007–2009)
- Imaginaerum World Tour (2012–2013)
- Endless Forms Most Beautiful World Tour (2015–2016)
- Decades: World Tour (2018)
- Human. :II: Nature. World Tour (2021–2023)

== See also ==
- List of best-selling music artists in Finland
- List of heavy metal bands
- List of symphonic metal bands
- Music of Finland
- Rock music in Finland
- Symphonic gothic metal
- Symphonic metal
- Symphonic power metal
- Tarja Turunen discography
