= Yesterwynde =

2024 studio album by Nightwish

Studio album by Nightwish
- Released: 20 September 2024
- Recorded: August–November 2023
- Studios: Röskö Campsite (Kitee); Paha Pajari (Kitee); Petrax (Hollola); Studio Dahl (Brastad); Troykington Castle (North Yorkshire); Abbey Road Studios (London)
- Genres: Symphonic metal; progressive metal; gothic metal
- Length: 71:07
- Label: Nuclear Blast
- Producer: Tuomas Holopainen

Nightwish studio album chronology
Human. :II: Nature. (2020)	Yesterwynde (2024)

Singles from Yesterwynde
- 1. "Perfume of the Timeless" Released: 21 May 2024; 2. "The Day of..." Released: 8 August 2024; 3. "An Ocean of Strange Islands" Released: 10 September 2024

Professional ratings
Review scores
Source	Rating
Blabbermouth.net	8.5/10
Classic Rock	4/5 stars
Distorted Sound	9/10
Kerrang!	5/5 stars
Metal Hammer	4.5/5 stars
Metal Injection	9/10
Rock Hard	8.5/10

Yesterwynde is the tenth studio album by the Finnish symphonic metal band Nightwish, released on 20 September 2024 by Nuclear Blast. It is the first studio album to feature Jukka Koskinen on bass, following Marko Hietala's departure from the band in January 2021, and the final studio album to feature lead vocalist Floor Jansen.

== Background ==
=== Production ===
Holopainen began drafting ideas for the next Nightwish album in March and April 2021 while also engaging with his side projects Auri and Darkwoods My Betrothed. He confirmed that the band had booked a studio for the next album, scheduled for three months in the summer of 2023 at the Röskö campsite. In March 2022, Holopainen entered the studio to write demos for the upcoming Nightwish album, which were later completed in June 2022.

After the band listened to the demos, Jansen, who was at the time working on her debut solo album, Paragon, commented that while the band's signature sound would remain intact, the album would take a heavier direction. Holopainen later confirmed that the next album would serve as both a continuation of Human. :II: Nature and the third and final part of a trilogy that began with Endless Forms Most Beautiful. After completing the demos in July at an undisclosed location, the band began tracking the album in August. Drummer Kai Hahto later confirmed that he had finished recording drums for eight songs. The band completed tracking their instruments in September 2023, with the orchestral arrangements concluding the following month. The recording sessions were completed by the end of November 2023. Mixing and mastering commenced at Finnvox Studios in January 2024, and was completed by the end of February.

== Composition ==
=== Themes ===
The title of the album is a word coined by band member Troy Donockley, which Holopainen describes as encapsulating the feelings of time, history, memory, and the connection to past generations, who have "all had their lives, their ups and downs, and they don't exist anymore, except as atoms scattered all over the universe. And we're going to be in that state pretty soon as well. So that should give you something to think about."

Holopainen has characterized the album as exploring themes of humanism, history, and their inspirations, emphasizing that the overall outlook of the album is positive and optimistic.

== Release and promotion ==
The album's title was announced on April 30, 2024, along with a release date of September 20, 2024. The first single from the album, titled "Perfume of the Timeless," was released on May 21, 2024. The second single, titled "The Day of...," was released on August 8, 2024. The third and final single, "An Ocean of Strange Islands," was released on September 10, 2024. A music video for the song "Lanternlight" was released on September 20, 2024, the same day the album was released. A lyric video for the album's title track was released on January 13, 2025.

To promote the release of the album, Nightwish partnered with four experiences on the online game platform Roblox from September 20 to September 22, allowing users to listen to the album in select experiences.

There was no tour planned to support the album, as the band began a hiatus from touring following its release, which Hahto stated would last for "two or three years."

== Track listing ==
All music and lyrics are written by Tuomas Holopainen.

Yesterwynde track listing
No.	Title	Length
1.	"Yesterwynde"	2:43
2.	"An Ocean of Strange Islands"	9:26
3.	"The Antikythera Mechanism"	5:55
4.	"The Day of..."	4:34
5.	"Perfume of the Timeless"	8:11
6.	"Sway"	4:23
7.	"The Children of 'Ata"	5:37
8.	"Something Whispered Follow Me"	6:39
9.	"Spider Silk"	6:26
10.	"Hiraeth"	6:14
11.	"The Weave"	4:53
12.	"Lanternlight"	6:06
Total length:		71:07

Streaming platforms bonus tracks
No.	Title	Length
13.	"Yesterwynde" (orchestral version)	3:22
14.	"An Ocean of Strange Islands" (orchestral version)	9:26
15.	"The Antikythera Mechanism" (orchestral version)	5:52
16.	"The Day of..." (orchestral version)	4:24
17.	"Perfume of the Timeless" (orchestral version)	8:13
18.	"Sway" (orchestral version)	3:26
19.	"The Children of 'Ata" (orchestral version)	5:19
20.	"Something Whispered Follow Me" (orchestral version)	6:32
21.	"Spider Silk" (orchestral version)	5:43
22.	"The Weave" (orchestral version)	4:49
23.	"Lanternlight" (orchestral version)	5:32
Total length:		133:00

== Personnel ==
Credits for Yesterwynde adapted from liner notes.

Nightwish

- Tuomas Holopainen – keyboards
- Emppu Vuorinen – guitars
- Floor Jansen – lead vocals
- Troy Donockley – Uilleann pipes, low whistles, acoustic guitar, bouzouki, bodhrán, aerophone, male vocals (on track 3, 5, 6, 9, 10 & 12), backing vocals (on track 1 & 8)
- Kai Hahto – drums, percussion
- Jukka Koskinen – bass

Additional personnel

- Hanalee Valke – vocals (on track 7)
- Tuomas Holopainen – production, mixing, orchestral and choir arrangements
- Troy Donockley – engineering
- Tero Kinnunen – production, engineering, mixing
- Mikko Karmila – engineering, mixing
- Jonathan Allen – engineering
- Neil Dawes – engineering assistant
- John Barrett – engineering (additional)
- Risto Hemmi – mixing (ATMOS version)
- Mika Jussila – mastering
- Niklas Jussila – mastering (ATMOS version)
- Pete Voutilainen – cover art, photography
- Mikko Pankasalo – layout
- James Shearman – conductor, orchestral and choir arrangements

The Sepian Voices

- Tom Pearce – choirmaster
- Sarah Eyden, Grace Davidson, Joanna Forbes, Sarah Ryan, Katy Treharne, Caroline Clarke, Sejal Keshwala, Jacqueline Barron, Soophia Roroughi, Kirsty Hoiles, Mary Carewe, Claire Henry, Alice Fearn, Louise Marshall, Liz Swain, Helen Brookes, Sumudu Jayatilaka, Jo Marshall, Tom Pearce, Gerry O'Beirne, Philip Brown, Robin Bailey, Richard Henders, Michael Robinson, Sebastian Charlesworth, Michare Dore, Ben Goddard, Lawrence White, Scott Davies, David Porter Thomas, Andrew Playfoot, Lawrence Wallington, James Mawson, Cameron Jones

The Children of 'Ata Choir

- Hanalee Valke, Isabella Moore, Philip Rhodes, Benson Wilson, Kieran Rayner

Children's Choir

- Malakai Bayoh, William Borthwick, Daniel Catalogna, Christy Cole, Charles Deconinck, Chet Gibson, Edward Grant, Lukas Haggo, Thomas King, Victor Livert, Kieran Lund-Deely, Filippo Pignatelli, Adrian Pueyo-Blasco, Henry Scully, Benedict Sefton, Alfie Sterne, Giulio Tittoto, Davide Wernig, Toby Yates

Sepian Orchestra

- Paul Edmund-Davies – flute
- Anna Noakes – flute, piccolo
- John Anderson – oboe, cor anglais
- Barnaby Robson – clarinet
- David Fuest – clarinet
- Gavin McNaughton – bassoon, contrabassoon
- Richard Watkins – french horn
- Nigel Black – french horn
- Martin Owen – french horn
- Michael Thompson – french horn
- John Thurgood – french horn
- Corinne Bailey – french horn
- Phil Woods – french horn
- Mike Lovatt – trumpet
- Jason Evans – trumpet
- Andy Wood – trombone
- Richard Edwards – trombone
- Ed Tarrant – trombone
- Barry Clements – trombone
- Adrian Miotti – tuba, cimbasso
- Bill Lockhart – timpani, percussion
- Paul Clarvis – percussion
- Frank Ricotti – percussion
- Chris Baron – percussion
- Skaila Kanga – harp
- Warren Zielinski – violin
- Jackie Shave – violin
- Patrick Kiernan – violin
- Steve Morris – violin
- Magnus Johnston – violin
- Oscar Perks – violin
- Ralph De Souza – violin
- John Mills – violin
- Jonathan Evans-Jones – violin
- Marije Johnston – violin
- Paul Willey – violin
- Raja Halder – violin
- Elizabeth Cooney – violin
- Kathy Gowers – violin
- Peter Hanson – violin
- Dorina Markoff – violin
- Julian Leaper – violin
- Lorraine McAslan – violin
- Fenella Barton – violin
- Oli Langford – violin
- Sarah Sexton – violin
- Thomas Kemp – violin
- Debbie Preece – violin
- Bea Lovejoy – violin
- Ben Buckton – violin
- Emil Chakalov – violin
- Clare Thompson – violin
- Thomas Gould – violin
- Laura Melhuish – violin
- Bruce White – viola
- Peter Lale – viola
- Daisy Spiers – viola
- Kate Musker – viola
- Reiad Chibah – viola
- Chris Pitsillides – viola
- Lydia Lowndes-Northcott – viola
- Fiona Bonds – viola
- Martin Humbey – viola
- Richard Cookson – viola
- Rebecca Carrington – viola
- Emma Sheppard – viola
- Ian Burdge – cello
- Caroline Dearnley – cello
- Tony Woollard – cello
- Sophie Harris – cello
- David Daniels – cello
- Jonathan Williams – cello
- Jonny Byers – cello
- Joely Koos – cello
- Rachael Lander – cello
- Adrian Bradbury – cello
- Frank Schaefer – cello
- Chris Laurence – double bass
- Stacey Watton – double bass
- Laurence Ungless – double bass
- Steve Rossell – double bass
- Beth Symmons – double bass
- Richard Pryce – double bass

== Charts ==
=== Weekly charts ===
Weekly chart performance for Yesterwynde
Chart (2024)	Peak position
Australian Physical Albums (ARIA)	25
Austrian Albums (Ö3 Austria)	2
Belgian Albums (Ultratop Flanders)	12
Belgian Albums (Ultratop Wallonia)	17
Czech Albums (ČNS IFPI)	78
Danish Vinyl Albums (Hitlisten)	28
Dutch Albums (Album Top 100)	4
Finnish Albums (Suomen virallinen lista)	1
French Albums (SNEP)	15
German Albums (Offizielle Top 100)	2
Hungarian Physical Albums (MAHASZ)	22
Italian Albums (FIMI)	47
Japanese Albums (Oricon)	50
Japanese Hot Albums (Billboard Japan)	59
Polish Albums (ZPAV)	10
Portuguese Albums (AFP)	15
Scottish Albums (Official Charts)	6
Spanish Albums (Promusicae)	36
Swedish Albums (Sverigetopplistan)	6
Swiss Albums (Schweizer Hitparade)	2
UK Albums (Official Charts)	20
UK Independent Albums (Official Charts)	3
UK Rock & Metal Albums (Official Charts)	1
US Top Album Sales (Billboard)	16
US Top Hard Rock Albums (Billboard)	24

=== Year-end charts ===
Year-end chart performance for Yesterwynde
Chart (2024)	Position
Swiss Albums (Schweizer Hitparade)	90
