= Perfume of the Timeless =

2024 single by Nightwish

Single by Nightwish

from the album Yesterwynde
- Released: 21 May 2024
- Length: 8:12
- Label: Nuclear Blast
- Songwriter: Tuomas Holopainen
- Producer: Tuomas Holopainen

Nightwish singles chronology
"Harvest" (2020)	"Perfume of the Timeless" (2024)	"The Day of..." (2024)

Music video
- "Perfume of the Timeless" on YouTube

"Perfume of the Timeless" is a single by the Finnish symphonic metal band Nightwish, the first from their tenth studio album, Yesterwynde. It was released on 21 May 2024. The single is the band's first published song to feature Jukka Koskinen on bass, replacing Marko Hietala. Pre-release, it had been described by Tuomas Holopainen to be an eight and a half minute long song, with the chorus coming in at 3:30 in the track.

== Cover art ==
The cover art of the single features a photograph taken by English artist Frank Meadow Sutcliffe, featuring a young woman helping an older woman wind wool. It was taken around the late 1800s in North Yorkshire, England. Nightwish's cover art is an edit of this photograph, with vocalist Floor Jansen replacing the younger woman in the photo.

== Personnel ==
=== Nightwish ===
- Tuomas Holopainen – keyboards
- Emppu Vuorinen – guitars
- Floor Jansen – lead vocals
- Troy Donockley – uilleann pipes, tin whistle, low whistle, bouzouki, guitars, male vocals, backing vocals
- Kai Hahto – drums
- Jukka Koskinen – bass
