= Noise (Nightwish song) =

Single by Nightwish

from the album Human. :II: Nature.
- Released: February 7, 2020
- Length: 5:40
- Label: Nuclear Blast
- Songwriter(s): Tuomas Holopainen
- Producer(s): Tuomas Holopainen

Nightwish singles chronology
"Endless Forms Most Beautiful" (2015)	"Noise" (2020)	"Harvest" (2020)

Music video
- "Noise" on YouTube

"Noise" is a single by the Finnish symphonic metal band Nightwish, the first from their ninth album Human. :II: Nature.. It was released with an accompanying video on February 7, 2020. The single is the band's first published song to feature the drummer Kai Hahto as a full-time member, following the departure of Jukka Nevalainen in July 2019.

== Lyrical content ==
The track has been described as a commentary on modern society. Following the music video's release, when asked if the video was criticism towards technology or cell phones, Tuomas responded:

This video is not a criticism about technology or cell phones. Me, all the band members, we love technology. We wouldn't ever have done this record without technology. We love our cell phones, the Internet and all that, but it's a criticism for the addiction that these things cause in human beings. 'Addiction' is the word. It's such a shame that we have all these wonderful tools that we can for the good, to spread true information and to be connected to the world. I love the idea of social media, I like Twitter, that everybody in the world suddenly has a voice; we have a voice. We can immediately get our opinions and views out there. It's just a matter of what you put out there. And that's what the video is all about.

== Track listing ==
Vinyl version

No.	Title	Length
1.	"Noise" (Album version)	5:41
2.	"Shoemaker" (Album version)	5:19

== Personnel ==
=== Nightwish ===
- Floor Jansen – lead vocals
- Emppu Vuorinen – guitars
- Marko Hietala – bass, male vocals, acoustic guitar, backing vocals
- Tuomas Holopainen – keyboards
- Troy Donockley – uilleann pipes, tin whistle, low whistle, bouzouki, guitars, male vocals, backing vocals
- Kai Hahto – drums

=== Additional personnel ===
- Tuomas Holopainen – production, recording, mixing
- Tero Kinnunen, Mikko Karmila – production, recording, mixing
- Mika Jussila – mastering

== Charts ==
Chart (2020)	Peak position
Finland Airplay (Radiosoittolista)	22
Hungary (Single Top 40)	19
