= Human. :II: Nature. =

2020 studio album by Nightwish

Studio album by Nightwish
- Released: 10 April 2020
- Recorded: August–October 2019
- Studios: Röskö Campsite (Kitee); Petrax (Hollola); Troykington Castle (North Yorkshire); Finnvox (Helsinki)
- Genres: Symphonic metal; orchestral
- Length: 81:31
- Label: Nuclear Blast
- Producer: Tuomas Holopainen

Nightwish studio album chronology
Endless Forms Most Beautiful (2015)	Human. :II: Nature. (2020)	Yesterwynde (2024)

Singles from Human. :II: Nature.
- 1. "Noise" Released: 7 February 2020; 2. "Harvest" Released: 6 March 2020

Human. :II: Nature. (stylized as HVMAN. :||: NATVRE.) is the ninth studio album by the Finnish symphonic metal band Nightwish, released on 10 April 2020 by Nuclear Blast. It is the band's first double album, with the second CD complete with orchestral music rather than metal.

Following the departure of original drummer Jukka Nevalainen the previous year, this is the first album to feature Kai Hahto as an official band member, although he had already acted as Nevalainen's replacement on the band's previous album, Endless Forms Most Beautiful. It is the sixth and final album to feature bassist/vocalist Marko Hietala before his departure in January 2021.

The album became the band's seventh consecutive album to top the Official Finnish Albums Chart.

== Background and recording ==
=== Production ===
Following a tour in support of the band's previous album, Endless Forms Most Beautiful, the band took a year-long break in which Jansen was focusing on her first child. Holopainen said in a 2016 interview that the band would continue between the years of 2018 and 2020, with another album that will continue the themes explored in Endless Forms Most Beautiful.

According to Tuomas Holopainen, after the creation of the previous album, which he described as "the band's best so far", he could not write new material for the next album because of his lack of inspiration, which was "emptied". In 2017, Holopainen, along with the singer and his wife Johanna Kurkela and the band's member Troy Donockley, formed the trio-band Auri to create a self-titled album. After the release of the album, Tuomas said that "all the flood gates opened" and he started to write new material for Nightwish.

In July 2018 while the band was out on tour, Holopainen stated that he had written "80 or 90%" of the material for Nightwish's next album, which would consist of ten or eleven songs. Recording would start in July 2019, for a planned Spring 2020 release. The band would "use the [orchestral] instrumentation in a different way than before", with Holopainen stating, "You want to search for some new ways of using it so that it doesn't end up sounding the same as before."

Jansen stated in November that she believed the recording process would be similar to Endless Forms Most Beautiful's, for which the band went through lengthy rehearsals before starting to record.

On 31 October 2019, Floor Jansen confirmed that recording for the new album had been completed, stating that she was "very, very happy" with it. Tuomas Holopainen was confirmed on 18 December 2019 to be at Finnvox Studios mixing Nightwish's upcoming studio album, set for release in the first quarter of 2020.

The mixing was done by Holopainen, Tero Kinnunen and Mikko Karmila, and mastering by Mika Jussila, at Finnvox Studios. On 10 January 2020, it was confirmed by Holopainen that the production was finished, and the album was ready for release. The album title, cover and other details were released on 16 January 2020, including the release date of 10 April 2020.

== Composition ==
=== Influences, style and themes ===
The album features a wide vocal collaboration between Marko Hietala, Troy Donockley and Jansen, which "brings a whole new sound in the band", according to Jansen. It can be reflected for example in first song in the album, "Music", which describes the history of music, "from the first rudimentary sounds to the music as we know today". This song starts with a long intro and described as very harmonic and melodic.

The second track, "Noise", has been described as a commentary on modern society. Following the release of the song's music video, when asked if the video was criticism towards technology or cell phones, Holopainen responded:

"This video is not a criticism about technology or cell phones. Me, all the band members, we love technology. We wouldn't ever have done this record without technology. We love our cell phones, the Internet and all that, but it's a criticism for the addiction that these things cause in human beings. 'Addiction' is the word. It's such a shame that we have all these wonderful tools that we can for the good, to spread true information and to be connected to the world. I love the idea of social media, I like Twitter, that everybody in the world suddenly has a voice; we have a voice. We can immediately get our opinions and views out there. It's just a matter of what you put out there. And that's what the video is all about."

"Shoemaker" is about Eugene Shoemaker, whose biography inspired Holopainen to write a song. According to Jansen, the song lacks a typical structure. Consisting of operatic voices, the song was a challenge to Jansen to sing, and it took several times to record until the desired result. Johanna Kurkela, Holopainen's wife, took part in this song, performing a spoken part before Jansen's ending operatic part.

According to Donockley, the lyrics of "Harvest" consist of the meaning of the whole theme of the album and even of life.

According to Holopainen, "Pan" is described as an ode to the human imagination.

About "How's the Heart?", Holopainen had commented: "Human empathy, altruism, true love. They truly are the better angels of our nature. The nature of the human kind. We have the potential to be such a great species. And in many ways we already are. It is really important to remember to ask your family, your friends, strangers and yourself the important question: How's the Heart?"

On the topic of the seventh track on the album and the first track written, "Procession", Holopainen stated that the listener would have to delve into the lyrics to understand what the song is about, stating that the American television series Stranger Things was an influence for the song.

"Tribal" is described by Hahto as heavy and very percussive. This song along with other tracks in the album demanded Hahto to upgrade his drum kit. According to Hahto, this song is an example to the variety of the different musical styles presented in the whole album.

According to Hietala, the ninth track "Endlessness" is about "a 'multiversal' force so grand that it actually binds and permeates everything or all of our lives; just tiny particles in this mighty flow, and then there's this mere human vocalist and his friend a human being as well has written the story and we are in this rock pool; try to bring its unique loneliness across to other mere humans."

== Release and promotion ==
The first single of the album, "Noise", with an accompanying music video, was released on 7 February 2020. The second single from the album, "Harvest", was released on 6 March 2020 with a lyric video to accompany its release. On 11 March 2020, "Ad Astra", the last track of the album's second disc, was released in a video that revealed Nightwish's new partnership with World Land Trust.

Nightwish stated on 22 January 2020 that they became the "first band ever to be given permission" to do a photo shoot in the "legendary Cathedral that is the Natural History Museum, London", where they had four hours to themselves during the shoot.

On the day the album was released, Nightwish released lyric videos for all of the songs on the album.

In an interview with Floor Jansen, she had revealed the band had originally asked natural historian David Attenborough to speak on the album. She commented:

We tried to get him to speak on the album. We wrote him a letter and he wrote one back, declining, but it was very impressive that a man of his stature would write personally to us and explain that he just didn't have the time right now.

On 21 January 2021, the album was nominated at the Finnish Emma Awards for Album of the Year and Metal Album of the Year. The album ended up winning the category of Metal Album of the Year.

=== Tour ===
The band toured in Europe, South America, Asia and North America throughout 2021 to 2023 in promotion of the album. The tour was originally scheduled to begin in spring 2020, but due to the COVID-19 pandemic, the band had postponed the tour to next year.

The band began their world tour in support of the album in May 2021 with an interactive livestream experience in a virtual reality built tavern which featured songs from the album. Both of the performances had broken records with the first drawing 150,000 viewers and setting it as the most viewed virtual performance in Finland, with the box office exceeding one million in euros. The band resumed their tour in Finland in late July 2021 with a "secret" performance in Oulu. The tour concluded in June 2023.

== Reception ==
=== Critical reception ===
Professional ratings
Aggregate scores
Source	Rating
Metacritic	66/100
Review scores
Source	Rating
AllMusic	3.5/5 stars
The Arts Desk	4/5 stars
Blabbermouth.net	8.5/10
Folk N' Rock	9.2/10
Kerrang!	3/5 stars
Louder Sound	4/5 stars
Metal Storm	5.7/10

The album received generally mixed reviews from music critics upon the album's release.

At Metacritic, which assigns a normalized rating out of 100 to reviews from mainstream critics, the album has an average score of 66 based on 4 reviews, indicating "generally favorable reviews". AllMusic gave the album a positive review, saying that "Human. :II: Nature....is, with one exception, a consistently and deeply satisfying outing that was worth waiting for." The exception, for them, was "Harvest", which they remark "just doesn't work".

Kerrang! gave the album 3 out of 5 and stated: "At its best, Hvman:||:Natvre has the impressive magic that has made Nightwish one of Europe's biggest bands. But there's a feeling this time that for such a big concept, things haven't gone quite far enough."

Louder Sound gave the album a positive review and stated: "You know a band feels pretty confident when they take liberties with the rules of the language of rock'n'roll. But however you pronounce the punctuation-incontinent title, Human. :II: Nature., Nightwish's first studio album for five years, doesn't try to confuse us any further."

=== Accolades ===
Year	Ceremony	Award	Result
2021	Emma-gaala Awards	Album of the Year	Nominated
2021	Emma-gaala Awards	Metal Album of the Year	Won

== Track listing ==
All music and lyrics are written by Tuomas Holopainen.

Disc one
No.	Title	Length
1.	"Music"	7:23
2.	"Noise"	5:40
3.	"Shoemaker"	5:19
4.	"Harvest"	5:13
5.	"Pan"	5:18
6.	"How's the Heart?"	5:02
7.	"Procession"	5:31
8.	"Tribal"	3:56
9.	"Endlessness"	7:11
Total length:		50:33

Disc two – "All the Works of Nature Which Adorn the World"
No.	Title	Length
1.	"Vista"	3:59
2.	"The Blue"	3:35
3.	"The Green"	4:42
4.	"Moors"	4:44
5.	"Aurorae"	2:07
6.	"Quiet as the Snow"	4:05
7.	"Anthropocene" (includes "Hurrian Hymn to Nikkal")	3:05
8.	"Ad Astra"	4:41
Total length:		30:58

=== Notes ===
- "All the Works of Nature Which Adorn the World" is listed on the back cover of the album as a single song, split into eight chapters.
- The earbook edition of the album includes a third disc with the instrumental version of disc one.
- The tour edition includes both standard audio CDs and a third blu-ray disc with the Virtual Live Show from the Islanders Arms 2021.

== Personnel ==
Credits for Human. :II: Nature. adapted from liner notes.

Nightwish

- Floor Jansen – lead vocals, backing vocals (track 4)
- Emppu Vuorinen – guitars
- Marko Hietala – bass, lead vocals (track 9), acoustic guitar, backing vocals
- Kai Hahto – drums, percussion
- Tuomas Holopainen – keyboards, production, recording, mixing
- Troy Donockley – Uilleann pipes, low whistle, bouzouki, bodhran, digital aerophone, guitars, lead vocals (track 4), backing vocals

Additional personnel

- Geraldine James – spoken words on "All the Works of Nature Which Adorn the World" ("Vista", "Ad Astra")
- Johanna Kurkela – spoken words on "Shoemaker"
- Tero Kinnunen – production, engineering, mixing
- Mikko Karmila – production, engineering, mixing
- Mat Bartram – orchestra engineering
- Laura Beck – orchestra engineering assistant
- Mika Jussila – mastering
- Janne Pitkänen – cover art
- Pip Williams – orchestral and choir arrangements and directing
- Ilona Opulska – assistant to Williams
- James Shearman – conductor
- Martin Higgins – assistant to Shearman
- Richard Ihnatowicz – music preparation

Metro Voices

- Jenny O'Grady – choirmaster
- Alexandra Gibson, Alice Fearn, Ann de Renais, Anne Marie Cullum, Caroline Fitzgerald, Claire Henry, Davina Moon, Eleanor Meynell, Heather Cairncross, Helen Brooks, Helen Parker, Jacqueline Barron, Joanna Forbes, Kate Bishop, Mary Carewe, Rachel Weston, Rosemary Forbes Butler, Sarah Ryan, Soophia Foroughi, Andrew Busher, Andrew Playfoot, David Porter Thomas, Gerard O'Beirne, Ian McLarnon, Lawrence Wallington, Lawrence White, Michael Dore, Peter Snipp, Robin Bailey, Sebastian Charlesworth, Tom Pearce

Pale Blue Orchestra

- Isobel Griffiths – orchestral contractor
- Andy Findon – flute, alto flute
- Anna Noakes – flute, piccolo
- John Anderson – oboe, cor anglais
- Nicholas Bucknall – clarinet
- Dave Fuest – clarinet, bass clarinet
- Gavin McNaughton – bassoon, contrabassoon
- Nigel Black – French horn
- Martin Owen – French horn
- Philip Eastop – French horn
- Andrew Crowley – trumpet
- Kate Moore – trumpet
- Mike Lovatt – trumpet
- Andy Wood – tenor trombone
- Ed Tarrant – tenor trombone
- Dave Stewart – bass trombone
- Owen Slade – tuba
- Stephen Henderson – timpani, ethnic percussion
- Frank Ricotti – orchestral percussion
- Gary Kettel – orchestral percussion
- Paul Clarvis – ethnic percussion
- Perry Montague-Mason – violin
- Emlyn Singleton – violin
- Chris Tombling – violin
- John Bradbury – violin
- Emil Chakalov – violin
- Patrick Kiernan – violin
- Mark Berrow – violin
- Warren Zielinski – violin
- Rita Manning – violin
- John Mills – violin
- Chris Tombling – violin
- John Bradbury – violin
- Steve Morris – violin
- Pete Hanson – violin
- Clio Gould – violin
- Dai Emanuel – violin
- Daniel Bhattacharya – violin
- Peter Lale – viola
- Andy Parker – viola
- Julia Knight – viola
- Kate Musker – viola
- Helen Kamminga – viola
- Caroline Dale – cello
- Martin Loveday – cello
- Frank Schaefer – cello
- Jonathan Williams – cello
- Tim Gill – cello
- Chris Worsey – cello
- Chris Laurence – double bass
- Steve Mair – double bass
- Stacey Watton – double bass
- Skaila Kanga – harp
- Dirk Campbell – duduk, ethnic winds

== Charts ==
=== Weekly charts ===
Weekly chart performance for Human. :II: Nature.
Chart (2020)	Peak position
Australian Albums (ARIA)	7
Austrian Albums (Ö3 Austria)	2
Belgian Albums (Ultratop Flanders)	11
Belgian Albums (Ultratop Wallonia)	14
Canadian Albums (Billboard)	85
Croatian International Albums (HDU)	1
Czech Albums (ČNS IFPI)	4
Dutch Albums (Album Top 100)	2
Finnish Albums (Suomen virallinen lista)	1
French Albums (SNEP)	26
German Albums (Offizielle Top 100)	1
Hungarian Albums (MAHASZ)	2
Italian Albums (FIMI)	45
Japanese Albums (Oricon)	39
Norwegian Albums (VG-lista)	4
Polish Albums (ZPAV)	3
Portuguese Albums (AFP)	3
Scottish Albums (Official Charts)	5
Spanish Albums (Promusicae)	1
Swedish Albums (Sverigetopplistan)	11
Swedish Hard Rock Albums (Sverigetopplistan)	1
Swiss Albums (Schweizer Hitparade)	2
Swiss Albums (Romandie)	1
UK Albums (Official Charts)	28
UK Independent Albums (Official Charts)	2
UK Rock & Metal Albums (Official Charts)	1
US Billboard 200	110
US Independent Albums (Billboard)	13
US Top Hard Rock Albums (Billboard)	2
US Top Rock Albums (Billboard)	11

=== Year-end charts ===
Year-end chart performance for Human. :II: Nature.
Chart (2020)	Position
German Albums (Offizielle Top 100)	52
Swiss Albums (Schweizer Hitparade)	32
