= The Day of... =

2024 single by Nightwish

Single by Nightwish

from the album Yesterwynde
- B-side: "Perfume of the Timeless"
- Released: 8 August 2024
- Length: 4:34
- Label: Nuclear Blast
- Songwriter: Tuomas Holopainen
- Producer: Tuomas Holopainen

Nightwish singles chronology
"Perfume of the Timeless" (2024)	"The Day of..." (2024)	"An Ocean of Strange Islands" (2024)

Music video
- "The Day of..." on YouTube

"The Day of..." is a single by the Finnish symphonic metal band Nightwish, the second from their tenth studio album, Yesterwynde. It was released on 8 August 2024. A music video for the single was released on 13 August 2024.

== Lyrical content ==
Before the release of the single, Tuomas Holopainen said in a short video on YouTube:

"The Day of...", our second single, well that's something else musically. It's something very different that we have ever done. You get this lovely 80s feel to it, but when it gets really controversial are the lyrics. So let's wait for the storm.

Later, Holopainen explained the lyrics of the song in detail in an interview with German radio station Rock Antenne:

The song is about fear and controlling people with fear and that's what leaders, religious leaders, political leaders have done for millennia and today, especially media, it's something that rubs me the wrong way every single day, because even though the world is still filled with problems that we need to address – there are some terrible goings on – we are being fed this nonsense constantly about you have to be afraid of the end of the world and we're living in the worst times ever, the world is coming to an end, Y2K, the end of the Mayan calendars... How many times have we been predicted the end of the world and it's never happening, so the song has a very optimistic, positive message under it, that even though there is so much going on, that we need to address in this world, don't forget that you are extremely lucky to be alive, you have a few decades in the sun to live your life, so make the best out of it and try not to fear all.

== Personnel ==
=== Nightwish ===
- Tuomas Holopainen – keyboards
- Emppu Vuorinen – guitars
- Floor Jansen – lead vocals
- Troy Donockley – uilleann pipes, tin whistle, low whistle, bouzouki, guitars, male vocals, backing vocals
- Kai Hahto – drums
- Jukka Koskinen – bass
