= Nattfödd =

Studio album by Finntroll
- Released: 19 April 2004
- Recorded: 24 October – 14 November 2003
- Genre: Folk metal, black metal
- Length: 36:30
- Label: Spinefarm
- Producer: Henri Sorvali, Sami Uusitalo

Finntroll chronology
Trollhammaren (2004)	Nattfödd (2004)	Ur jordens djup (2007)

Professional ratings
Review scores
Source	Rating
AllMusic	2.5/5 stars
Metal Storm	9.5/10 stars

Nattfödd (English: Nightborn) is the third studio album by the Finnish folk metal band Finntroll. It was released on 19 April 2004 by Spinefarm Records in Finland and by Century Media outside.

Nattfödd marks a change in the musical direction of Finntroll, as they drift into a slightly slower, less frenzied sound that is reminiscent of some songs from their first album, Midnattens widunder. It also incorporates some of the acoustic and ambient elements from their previous album, Visor om slutet, though is largely a return to the band's folk and black metal roots.

A special edition of the album includes the EP Trollhammaren as a bonus disc.

== Track listing ==
No.	Title	Length
1.	"Vindfärd/Människopesten" ("Windtravel/Human Plague")	5:36
2.	"Eliytres"	3:46
3.	"Fiskarens fiende" ("Fisherman's Enemy")	3:47
4.	"Trollhammaren" ("The Trollhammer")	3:33
5.	"Nattfödd" ("Nightborn")	4:51
6.	"Ursvamp" ("Ancient Mushroom")	2:03
7.	"Marknadsvisan" ("Market Tune")	2:00
8.	"Det iskalla trollblodet" ("The Icecold Trollblood")	3:54
9.	"Grottans barn" ("Children of the Cave")	4:37
10.	"Rök" ("Smoke")	2:23
Total length:		36:30

- Tracks 1, 8 and 9 lyrics and music by Trollhorn.
- Tracks 2–4 and 6 lyrics by Wilska, music by Trollhorn/Tundra.
- Track 5 lyrics by Wilska, music by Trollhorn.
- Track 7 lyrics by Trollhorn, music by Routa/Trollhorn/Tundra.
- Track 10 music by Routa.

== Personnel ==
- Mikael "Routa" Karlbom – guitar
- Samuli "Skrymer" Ponsimaa – guitar
- Samu "Beast Dominator" Ruotsalainen – drums
- Henri "Trollhorn" Sorvali – keyboards
- Sami "Tundra" Uusitalo – bass
- Tapio Wilska – vocals
