= Ur jordens djup =

Studio album by Finntroll
- Released: 28 March 2007
- Recorded: October 2006
- Genre: Folk metal, black metal
- Length: 55:56
- Label: Spinefarm
- Producer: Trollhorn

Finntroll chronology
Nattfödd (2004)	Ur jordens djup (2007)	Nifelvind (2010)

Professional ratings
Review scores
Source	Rating
Allmusic	3.5/5 stars

Ur jordens djup (English: From the Depths of the Earth) is the fourth full-length Finntroll album. It was released on 28 March 2007. The album is the first to feature vocalist Mathias Lillmåns, who replaced Tapio Wilska in 2006. Unlike in Nattfödd, the lyrics for this album were written by the band's original vocalist, Jan "Katla" Jämsen.

This and other factors appear to contribute to a darker, more black metal feel. A music video for "Nedgång" was released in April.

== Concept ==
The band approached the founding member Jämsen about writing the lyrics for this album. He chose to continue a semi-mythical saga which has been touched upon throughout Finntroll's career. The "kingshaman of the trolls" character Rivfader (Ripfather), was first introduced in their first demo, fittingly titled "Rivfader" (re-recorded for Midnattens widunder), but Jämsen has said that the story truly originated in the song "Födosagan" on the second album, Jaktens tid. The song "Eliytres", from Nattfödd, also makes reference to Rivfader.

Aside from this, the lyrical concept for this album was based on Nordic myths, the Kalevala (the Finnish national epic), history and stories of Jämsen's own creation. He has stated that the focus has moved from conflict between pagan and Christian beliefs, to being more concerned with the nature of myth, symbolism, and the origin of all mythology. This is meant to complement the old-and-new dynamic of the musical aspect of Finntroll, which mixes traditional folk music with very modern metal music.

The narrative of the album itself concerns a struggle between witches and troll-shamans, the death and resurrection of Rivfader, the "journey and odyssey of the shaman" and the "great war against one-self".

== Track listing ==
No.	Title	Length
1.	"Gryning" ("Dawn")	3:33
2.	"Sång" ("Song")	4:40
3.	"Korpens saga" ("The Raven's Saga")	3:26
4.	"Nedgång" ("Downfall")	3:44
5.	"Ur djupet" ("Out of the Deep")	4:59
6.	"Slagbröder" ("Battle-brothers")	4:31
7.	"En mäktig här" ("A Mighty Horde")	4:19
8.	"Ormhäxan" ("The Serpent Witch")	4:39
9.	"Maktens spira" ("Scepter of Power")	3:28
10.	"Under två runor" ("Beneath Two Runes")	5:36
11.	"Kvällning" ("Dusk")	13:01
Total length:		55:56

- All lyrics by Katla.
- Tracks 1–3, 7, 9–11 music by Trollhorn.
- Tracks 4 and 5 music by Trollhorn/Tundra.
- Track 6 music by Tundra.
- Track 8 music by Routa/Trollhorn.

== Personnel ==
- Mikael "Routa" Karlbom – guitar
- Mathias "Vreth" Lillmåns – vocals
- Samuli "Skrymer" Ponsimaa – guitar, backing vocals
- Samu "Beast Dominator" Ruotsalainen – drums and percussion, backing vocals
- Henri "Trollhorn" Sorvali – keyboards, acoustic guitar, banjo, mouth harp, backing vocals
- Sami "Tundra" Uusitalo – bass, backing vocals

Additional personnel

- Antti "Perish" Eräkangas – guitar solo on "Maktens Spira"
- Petri Eskelinen – shouting
- Katla – lyrics

Production

- Nino Laurenne – engineer, mixing
- Mika Jussila – mastering
