= Shape of Despair (album) =

Compilation album by Shape of Despair
- Released: 2005
- Genre: Funeral doom metal
- Length: 63:42
- Label: Spikefarm Records

Shape of Despair chronology
Illusion's Play (2004)	Shape of Despair (2005)	Monotony Fields (2015)

Shape of Despair is funeral doom metal band Shape of Despair's self-titled album. It was released on the 10th anniversary of the band's formation (counting the years the band was known as "Raven", from 1995 to 1998), but not in honor of the occasion. The album features previously unreleased songs and demos of older songs, while some of them are under the former moniker "Raven", as well as the new song "Sleeping Murder" that had a "guess the lyrics" competition.

== Track listing ==
1. "Sleeping Murder" – 8:35
2. "Night's Dew" (instrumental) – 4:16
3. "Sylvan-Night" – 10:23
4. "Quiet These Paintings Are/Outro" – 12:02
5. "To Adorn" – 8:52
6. "Shadowed Dreams" – 9:41
7. "In the Mist" (instrumental) – 9:52

== Track information ==
Sleeping Murder

- The band have a competition to guess the lyrics for this song.

Night's Dew

- This version is an edit of the original from the Angels of Distress album.

Sylvan-Night

- This is the unfinished version of the original on the Shades of... album.

Quiet These Paintings Are/Outro

- This is the Promo tape version, including the outro, under the name "Raven".

To Adorn

- This is from the "Alone in the Mist" recording while still under the name "Raven".

Shadowed Dreams

- This is from the "Alone in the Mist" recording while still under the name "Raven".

In the Mist

- Recorded during a rehearsal in 1995, under the name "Raven".

== Additional information ==
The unreleased demo entitled Alone in the Mist (recorded under the name "Raven") was recorded from January to February 1998 at Arikki studios.

== Personnel ==
- Pasi Koskinen – vocals on track 1
- Natalie Koskinen – female vocals on tracks 1, 3 & 4
- Jarno Salomaa – lead guitars & synth on all tracks, rhythm guitars on tracks 4–7, drum machine on track 4
- Tomi Ullgren – rhythm guitars on tracks 1–3 and bass on tracks 2–7
- Sami Uusitalo – bass on track 1
- Samu Ruotsalainen – drums on tracks 1, 2 & 3
- Toni Mäensivu – vocals on tracks 3, 5 & 6 and drums on tracks 5–7
- Miika "Azhemin" Niemelä – vocals on track 4
