= Vredesvävd =

Studio album by Finntroll
- Released: 18 September 2020
- Recorded: Sonic Pump Studios, Helsinki, Finland
- Genre: Folk metal, black metal
- Length: 38:22
- Label: Century Media

Finntroll chronology
Blodsvept (2013)	Vredesvävd (2020)

Vredesvävd (English: Wrath Woven) is the seventh studio album by Finnish folk metal band Finntroll. This is the band's first album in seven years, marking the longest gap between studio albums to date. The album was released on 18 September 2020. The album is also the first to feature drummer Heikki Saari, who joined the band in 2014, replacing Samu Ruotsalainen.

== Background ==
On 13 May 2014, drummer Samu Ruotsalainen revealed that he would be departing the band in July of that year; the parting was confirmed to be amicable by the band. He was replaced by Heikki "Mörkö" Saari. On 25 June 2020, the band announced that their next album, titled Vredesvävd, would be released on 18 September.

== Track listing ==
All tracks are written by Finntroll.

No.	Title	Translation	Length
1.	"Väktaren"	The Guardian	2:47
2.	"Att Döda Med En Sten"	To Kill with a Stone	3:37
3.	"Ormfolk"	Snake People	3:58
4.	"Grenars Väg"	Branches Road	3:44
5.	"Forsen"	The Rapids	4:07
6.	"Vid Häxans Härd"	At the Witch's Hearth	4:01
7.	"Myren"	The Marsh	2:49
8.	"Stjärnors Mjöd"	The Mead of the Stars	4:08
9.	"Mask"	Mask/Worm	3:01
10.	"Ylaren"	The Howler	5:06
11.	"Outro"		1:03
Total length:			38:22

== Personnel ==
Finntroll

- Mathias "Vreth" Lillmåns – vocals
- Samuli "Skrymer" Ponsimaa – guitar
- Mikael "Routa" Karlbom – guitar
- Sami "Tundra" Uusitalo – bass
- Heikki "Mörkö" Saari – drums
- Henri "Trollhorn" Sorvali – keyboards, guitar
- Jan "Katla" Jämsen – lyrics
