= Monotony Fields =

Studio album by Shape of Despair
- Released: June 15, 2015
- Recorded: 2013–2014 at City Lights Studio & S/Mental Studio
- Genre: Funeral doom metal
- Length: 74:25
- Label: Season of Mist
- Producer: Max Kostermaa; Shape of Despair

Shape of Despair chronology
Shape of Despair (2005)	Monotony Fields (2015)	Alone in the Mist (2016)

Professional ratings
Review scores
Source	Rating
Against Magazine	9.5/10 stars
Metal.de	9/10 stars
Stormbringer.at	4/5 stars

Monotony Fields is the fourth studio album by Finnish funeral doom metal band Shape of Despair, released on June 15, 2015 by Season of Mist as CD digipak and LP. It is the first album to feature Henri Koivula on lead vocals. The song "Written in My Scars" was first released on the EP Written in My Scars, but was re-recorded for this album.

== Musical style ==
The album continues the atmospheric funeral doom the band has been playing since their first album Shades of.... It is described as "melancholic and atmospheric", with "morose guitar lines" and "tragic ambient keyboards". The death grunts are "masterfully delivered", the female vocals are "gelid" and "angelic".

== Track listing ==
All lyrics are written by Henri Koivula, except "Written in My Scars" (by Pasi Koskinen); all music is composed by Jarno Salomaa and Tomi Ullgren

No.	Title	Length
1.	"Reaching the Innermost"	10:32
2.	"Monotony Fields"	10:40
3.	"Descending Inner Night"	10:04
4.	"The Distant Dream of Life"	5:52
5.	"Withdrawn"	9:58
6.	"In Longing"	7:38
7.	"The Blank Journey"	11:50

Bonus track
No.	Title	Length
8.	"Written in My Scars"	7:51

== Personnel ==
=== Shape of Despair ===
- Henri Koivula – vocals
- Natalie Koskinen – vocals
- Jarno Salomaa – guitars & synth
- Tomi Ullgren – guitars
- Sami Uusitalo – bass
- Samu Ruotsalainen – drums

=== Production ===
- Max Kostermaa - producer, engineer, mixing
- Mika Jussila - mastering
- Juha Takalo - band logo
- Mariusz Krystew - cover artwork
