= Blodsvept =

Studio album by Finntroll
- Released: March 22, 2013
- Recorded: Sonic Pump Studios, Helsinki, Finland
- Genre: Folk metal, black metal
- Length: 42:58
- Label: Century Media

Finntroll chronology
Nifelvind (2010)	Blodsvept (2013)	Vredesvävd (2020)

Blodsvept (English: Shrouded in Blood) is the sixth studio album by Finnish folk metal band Finntroll. The album was released on March 22, 2013. The album is the last to feature drummer Samu "Beast Dominator" Ruotsalainen, who left the band in 2014. The album features artwork by band member Samuli "Skrymer" Ponsimaa, including a painting for each song on the album.

Professional ratings
Review scores
Source	Rating
Sputnikmusic	3.7/5
Soundscape Magazine	8/10

== Track listing ==
All tracks are written by Finntroll

No.	Title	Translation	Length
1.	"Blodsvept"	Shrouded in Blood	4:29
2.	"Ett folk förbannat"	A People Accursed	3:23
3.	"När jättar marschera"	When Giants March	4:07
4.	"Mordminnen"	Murder Memories	3:24
5.	"Rösets kung"	King of the Cairn	3:15
6.	"Skövlarens död"	Waster's Death	3:44
7.	"Skogsdotter"	Daughter of the Forest	4:53
8.	"Häxbrygd"	Witch's Brew	3:52
9.	"Två ormar"	Two Serpents	3:17
10.	"Fanskapsfylld"	Filled with Devilry	2:57
11.	"Midvinterdraken"	The Mid-Winter Dragon	5:37
Total length:			42:58

== Personnel ==
Finntroll

- Mathias "Vreth" Lillmåns – vocals
- Samuli "Skrymer" Ponsimaa – guitar
- Mikael "Routa" Karlbom – guitar
- Sami "Tundra" Uusitalo – bass
- Samu "Beast Dominator" Ruotsalainen – drums
- Henri "Trollhorn" Sorvali – keyboards, guitar
- Aleksi "Virta" Virta - keyboards
- Jan "Katla" Jämsen – lyrics
