= Trollhammaren =

EP by Finntroll
- Released: 13 April 2004
- Recorded: October–November 2003
- Genre: Folk metal, black metal
- Length: 17:05
- Label: Spinefarm
- Producer: Henri Sorvali, Sami Uusitalo

Finntroll chronology
Visor om slutet (2003)	Trollhammaren (2004)	Nattfödd (2004)

Trollhammaren (English: The Trollhammer) is an EP from Finnish band Finntroll. It was released on April 13, 2004, by Spinefarm.

In an unusual style, this album incorporates an accordion for the intro and chorus.

== Track listing ==
1. "Trollhammaren" (The Trollhammer) (lyrics: Wilska, music: Trollhorn/Tundra) – 3:29
2. "Hemkomst" (Homecoming) (lyrics: Wilska, music: Trollhorn) – 3:46
3. "Skog" (Forest) (lyrics/music: Routa) – 3:23
4. "Försvinn du som lyser (Metal Version)" (Begone, You Who Shine) (lyrics: Katla, music: Somnium) – 2:17
5. "Hel vete" (Whole Wheat) (lyrics: Wilska, music: Tundra) – 4:14

== Personnel ==
- Mikael "Routa" Karlbom – guitar
- Samuli "Skrymer" Ponsimaa – guitar
- Samu "Beast Dominator" Ruotsalainen – drums
- Henri "Trollhorn" Sorvali – keyboards
- Sami "Tundra" Uusitalo – bass
- Tapio Wilska – vocals
