= Illusion's Play =

Studio album by Shape of Despair
- Released: September 27, 2004
- Recorded: August 2003 – May 2004 at HellHole Studio
- Genre: Funeral doom metal Dark ambient
- Length: 61:31
- Label: Spikefarm Records
- Producer: Hinkkala, Lindell & Shape of Despair

Shape of Despair chronology
Angels of Distress (2001)	Illusion's Play (2004)	Shape of Despair (2005)

Professional ratings
Review scores
Source	Rating
Encyclopaedia Metallum #1	8.5/10 stars
Encyclopaedia Metallum #2	9.1/10 stars
Encyclopaedia Metallum #3	6.7/10 stars
Encyclopaedia Metallum #4	6.5/10 stars

Illusion's Play is funeral doom metal band Shape of Despair's third studio album.

== Track listing ==
1. "Sleep Mirrored (Instrumental)" – 6:09
2. "Still-Motion" – 16:29
3. "Entwined in Misery" – 8:03
4. "Curse Life" – 9:18
5. "Fragile Emptiness" – 8:56
6. "Illusion's Play" – 12:36

All music & lyrics written in years '00-'02 by Jarno Salomaa.

== Recording information ==
- Engineered & mixed by Kaide Hinkkala & Antti Lindell
- Mastered at Finnvox Studios by Mika Jussila

== Credits ==
=== Shape of Despair ===
- Pasi Koskinen – vocals
- Natalie Koskinen – vocals
- Jarno Salomaa – guitars & synth
- Tomi Ullgren – guitars
- Sami Uusitalo – bass
- Samu Ruotsalainen – drums

=== Guest musicians ===
- Toni Raehalme – violin
- Aslak Tolonen – kantele
