= Nifelvind =

Studio album by Finntroll
- Released: 17 February 2010
- Recorded: July–September 2009 at the Sonic Pump Studios in Helsinki
- Genre: Folk metal, black metal
- Length: 45:48
- Label: Century Media

Finntroll chronology
Ur jordens djup (2007)	Nifelvind (2010)	Blodsvept (2013)

Nifelvind (English: Underworld's Winds) is the fifth full-length album by the Finnish folk metal band Finntroll, released on February 17, 2010 through Century Media.

This album reached the highest chart result in Finland by reaching position #8. It also entered the German album charts on #31, as well as the charts in Switzerland (#41) and Austria (#61).

== Track listing ==
All lyrics are written by Katla

Tracks 2, 4, 5, 6, 7, & 11 music by Trollhorn

Tracks 3 & 8 music by Trollhorn & Tundra

Tracks 9 & 10 music by Trollhorn & Routa

No.	Title	Length
1.	"Blodmarsch (Intro)" ("Bloodmarch")	2:12
2.	"Solsagan" ("The Saga of the Sun")	4:32
3.	"Den frusna munnen" ("The Frozen Mouth")	4:05
4.	"Ett norrskensdåd" ("A Deed of Northern Lights")	3:35
5.	"I trädens sång" ("Within the Song of the Trees")	3:45
6.	"Tiden utan tid" ("The Time Without Time")	4:58
7.	"Galgasång" ("Gallows Song")	3:45
8.	"Mot skuggornas värld" ("Towards the World of Shadows")	4:44
9.	"Under bergets rot" ("Under the Root of the Mountain")	3:28
10.	"Fornfamnad" ("Embraced by the Ancient")	3:43
11.	"Dråp" ("Manslaughter")	7:01
Total length:		45:48

== Personnel ==
- Mathias "Vreth" Lillmåns – vocals
- Samuli "Skrymer" Ponsimaa – guitar
- Mikael "Routa" Karlbom – guitar
- Sami "Tundra" Uusitalo – bass
- Samu "Beast Dominator" Ruotsalainen – drums
- Henri "Trollhorn" Sorvali – keyboards, guitar
- Aleksi "Virta" Virta – keyboards
- Jan "Katla" Jämsen – lyrics
