= Visor om slutet =

EP by Finntroll
- Released: 30 April 2003
- Recorded: 2002–2003
- Genres: Acoustic, folk, humppa
- Length: 32:36
- Label: Spinefarm

Finntroll chronology
Jaktens tid (2001)	Visor om slutet (2003)	Trollhammaren (2004)

Visor om slutet (English: Songs About the End) is an acoustic EP by the Finnish folk metal band Finntroll. It was released in 2003 by Spinefarm. It was the first album to feature Tapio Wilska on vocals, and the last to feature Jan "Katla" Jämsen, who was forced into retirement in 2003 due to a tumour developing on his vocal cords. This is also the last album to feature Teemu "Somnium" Raimoranta on guitars, who died several months after Katla's departure.

Visor om slutet was released after a number of misfortunes befell several band members, including the death of guitarist Teemu Raimoranta, to whom the album is dedicated. It was recorded in a cabin off in the woods near Helsinki, coined as an "acoustic experiment," and features the use of traditionally non-metal instruments such as the kazoo. Though quite different in its sound to the folk metal-inspired Jaktens tid, the album was a relative success.

== Track listing ==
All lyrics are written by Katla/Wilska.

No.	Title	Music	Translation	Length
1.	"Suohengen sija"	Tundra	The Place of the Swamp Spirit	2:59
2.	"Asfågelns död"	Trollhorn	Death of the Carrion Bird	3:46
3.	"Försvinn du som lyser"	Somnium	Begone, You Who Shine	2:39
4.	"Veripuu"	Tundra	Blood Tree	1:16
5.	"Under varje rot och sten"	Trollhorn	Under Every Root and Stone	3:18
6.	"När allt blir is"	Trollhorn	When Everything Turns to Ice	2:36
7.	"Den sista runans dans"	Skrymer	The Dance of the Last Rune	3:45
8.	"Rov"	Finntroll	Prey	2:05
9.	"Madon laulu"	Wilska	The Worm's Song	4:01
10.	"Svart djup"	Trollhorn	Black Depth	3:58
11.	"Avgrunden öppnas"	Tundra	The Abyss Opens	2:20

== Personnel ==
- Jan "Katla" Jämsen – vocals
- Samuli "Skrymer" Ponsimaa – rhythm guitar
- Teemu "Somnium" Raimoranta – lead, rhythm & acoustic guitar, choirs
- Samu "Beast Dominator" Ruotsalainen - drums
- Henri "Trollhorn" Sorvali – keyboards
- Sami "Tundra" Uusitalo – bass
- Tapio Wilska - vocals
