= Midnattens widunder =

Midnattens Widunder

Studio album by Finntroll
- Released: 1999
- Recorded: September 1999, Walltone Studios
- Genre: Folk metal, black metal
- Length: 30:00
- Label: Spinefarm
- Producer: Mika Jussila, Tuomo Valtonen

Finntroll chronology
Midnattens Widunder (1999)	Jaktens tid (2001)

Professional ratings
Review scores
Source	Rating
Chronicles of Chaos	7/10

Midnattens Widunder (English: Midnight Beasts) is the debut studio album by Finnish folk metal band Finntroll. It was released in Finland in 1999 by Spinefarm.

== Concept ==
The lyrical content of the album follows the story of the legendary Rivfader ("Rip-father"), "king-shaman" of the trollish race, and his war against Christian encroachment of the trollish "North Lands". The trolls gather under the Svartberg ("Black Mountain") around the ancient throne of Rivfader, who then leads them on a war against the "Tribe of Christ". The story acts as an analogy of the conflict between Christians and Pagans in Early Medieval Scandinavia, and many of the concepts appearing in the album are returned to in the band's later work. The character of the Troll-King Rivfader, in particular, is a recurring figure, again taking centre-stage for the band's fourth album, Ur Jordens Djup.

== Track listing ==
No.	Title	Length
1.	"Intro"	1:56
2.	"Svartberg" ("Black Mountain")	4:07
3.	"RivFader" ("Ripfather")	4:09
4.	"Vätteanda" ("Goblin Spirit")	4:36
5.	"Bastuvisan" ("The Sauna Song")	1:18
6.	"BlodNatt" ("Blood Night")	5:12
7.	"Midnattens widunder" ("The Beasts of Midnight")	4:40
8.	"Segersång" ("Victory Song")	1:58
9.	"Svampfest" ("Mushroom Feast")	2:04
Total length:		30:00

- Tracks 1 and 9 music by Trollhorn.
- Track 2 lyrics by Katla, music by Trollhorn.
- Tracks 3, 4 and 6-8 lyrics by Katla, music by Somnium.
- Track 5 lyrics by Katla, music by Somnium/Trollhorn.

== Personnel ==
- Jan "Katla" Jämsen – vocals
- Samuli "Skrymer" Ponsimaa (credited as "Örmy") – guitar
- Teemu "Somnium" Raimoranta – guitar
- Samu "Beast Dominator" Ruotsalainen – drums
- Henri "Trollhorn" Sorvali – keyboards
- Sami "Tundra" Uusitalo – bass

Additional personnel

- Tapio Wilska – clean vocals on "Vätteanda" and "Midnattens widunder"
- Mistress Helga – accordion on "Midnattens widunder"
