= Salomaa =

Salomaa is a Finnish surname. Notable people with the surname include:

- Arto Salomaa (1934–2025), Finnish mathematician and computer scientist
- Hiski Salomaa, Finnish-American folk singer
- Jarno Salomaa, Finnish metal musician
- Sonya Salomaa, Canadian Finnish actor
