= Jaktens tid =

Studio album by Finntroll
- Released: 18 September 2001
- Genre: Folk metal, black metal
- Length: 45:20
- Label: Spinefarm

Finntroll chronology
| Midnattens widunder (1999) | Jaktens tid (2001) | Visor om slutet (2003) |

Professional ratings
Review scores
| Source | Rating |
|---|---|
| AllMusic | 1.5/5 stars |

Jaktens tid (English: "Time of the Hunt") is the second studio album by the Finnish folk metal band Finntroll, released on 18 September 2001 through Spinefarm Records.

== Track listing ==
| No. | Title | Length |
|---|---|---|
| 1. | "Krig (Intro)" ("War") | 2:09 |
| 2. | "Födosagan" ("The Feeding Tale") | 5:03 |
| 3. | "Slaget vid Blodsälv" ("Battle at Bloodriver") | 3:17 |
| 4. | "Skogens hämnd" ("Revenge of the Forest") | 4:06 |
| 5. | "Jaktens tid" ("Time of the Hunt") | 3:34 |
| 6. | "Bakom varje fura" ("Behind Every Pine") | 2:15 |
| 7. | "Kitteldags" ("Kettletime") | 2:05 |
| 8. | "Krigsmjöd" ("Warmead") | 3:10 |
| 9. | "VargTimmen" ("The Hour of the Wolf" (Hedningarna cover) | 3:31 |
| 10. | "Kyrkovisan" ("The Church Song") | 1:22 |
| 11. | "Den hornkrönte konungen (Rivfaders tron)" ("The Horn-Crowned King (Throne of Rivfader)") | 3:45 |
| 12. | "Aldhissla" | 6:28 |
| 13. | "Tomhet och tystnad härska (Outro)" ("Silence and Emptiness Reign") | 4:35 |
| Total length: | | 45:20 |

- All lyrics are written by Katla (except track 9: traditional arr. Stake).
- Tracks 2, 5 and 12 music by Somnium.
- Tracks 3, 6, 10 and 11 music by Trollhorn.
- Tracks 4 and 7 music by Somnium/Trollhorn.
- Track 8 music by Trollhorn/Tundra.
- Track 9 music traditional arr. Lundmark.

== Personnel ==
- Jan "Katla" Jämsen – vocals
- Samuli "Skrymer" Ponsimaa – rhythm guitar
- Teemu "Somnium" Raimoranta – lead, rhythm & acoustic guitar, choirs
- Samu "Beast Dominator" Ruotsalainen – drums, percussion, choirs
- Henri "Trollhorn" Sorvali – keyboards
- Sami "Tundra" Uusitalo – bass, choirs

Additional personnel

- Jonne Järvelä – joik-singing and choirs
- Hanky Bannister – banjo
- Vicar Tapio Wilska – Latin mumblings
