= Finntroll =

Finnish folk metal band

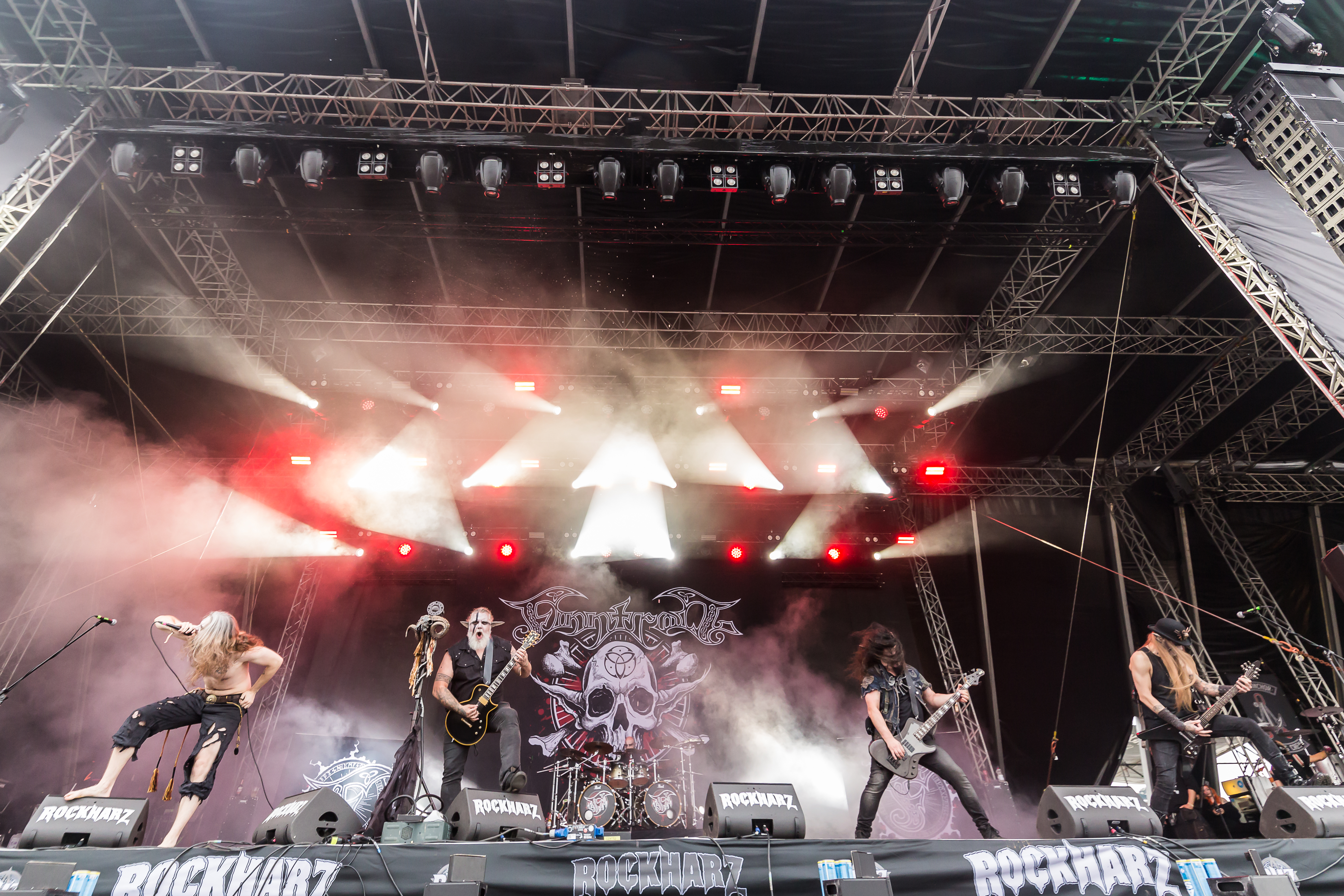
- Finntroll (with tour vocalist "Kistelach") at Rockharz 2026

Background information
- Origin: Helsinki, Finland
- Genres: Folk metal, black metal
- Years active: 1997–present
- Labels: Spinefarm, Century Media
- Members: Samuli Ponsimaa; Henri Sorvali; Sami Uusitalo; Mikael Karlbom; Aleksi Virta; Mathias Lillmåns; Heikki Saari
- Past members: Mikael Harju; Jan Jämsen; Rauno Raimoranta; Teemu Raimoranta; Tomi Ullgren; Samu Ruotsalainen; Tapio Wilska
- Website: trollhorde.com

Finntroll is a Finnish folk metal band from Helsinki. They combine black metal with a type of Finnish folk music called humppa. Finntroll's lyrics are mostly in Swedish, except the song "Madon Laulu" on Visor om slutet. Finntroll's original singer, Katla, used Swedish over Finnish because he was part of a Swedish-speaking minority in Finland, and the language seemed to suit the band's "trollish" outfit. Despite several vocalist changes, this tradition has continued.

The band has released seven full-length albums, a live album and three EPs. Their latest studio album, Vredesvävd, was released in 2020.

== History ==
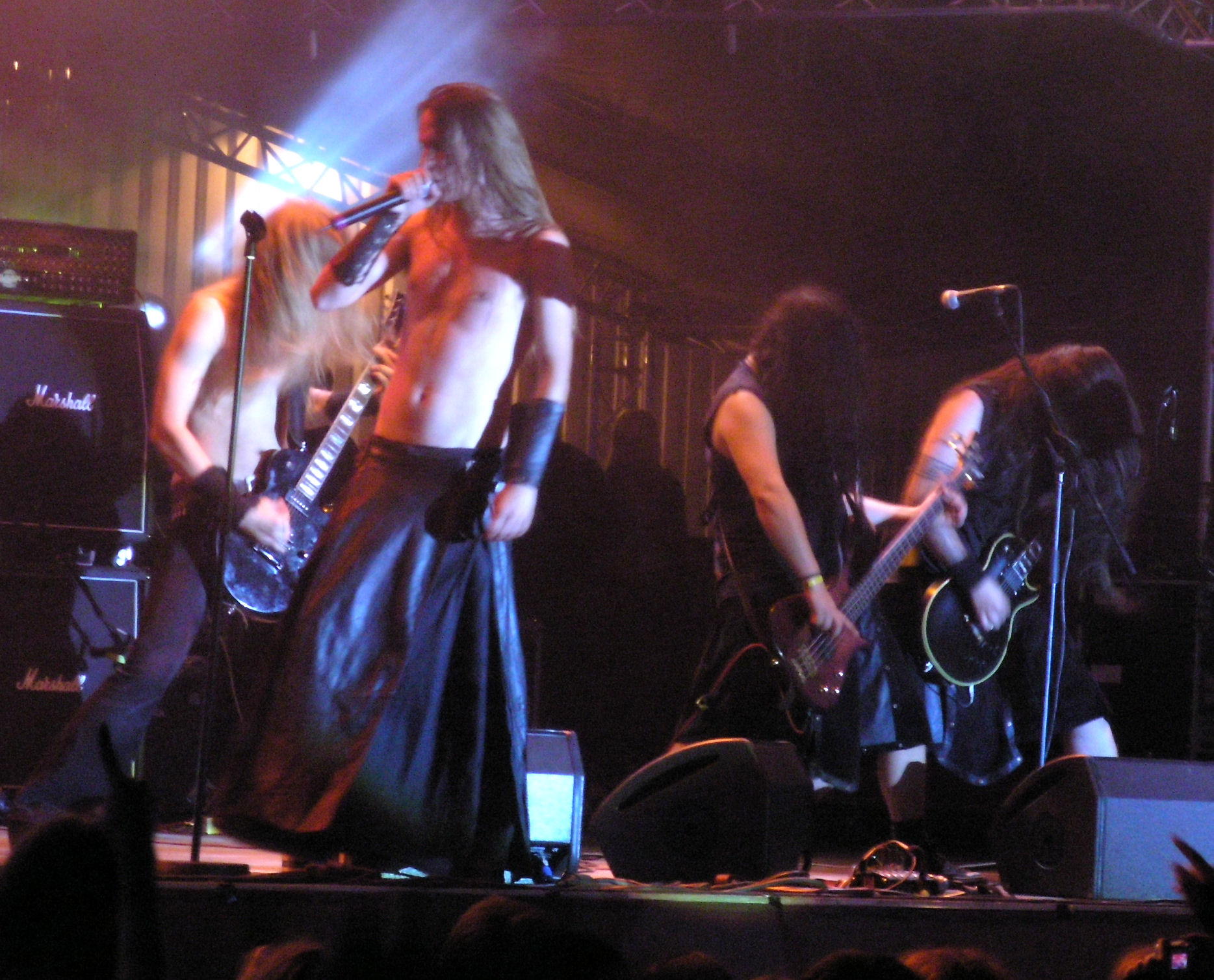
Finntroll at Masters of Rock 2007

Finntroll was founded in 1997 with guitarist Teemu "Somnium" Raimoranta and vocalist/lyricist Jan "Katla" Jämsen. A year later, they were joined by guitarist Samuli "Skrymer" Ponsimaa, drummer Samu "Beast Dominator" Ruotsalainen, keyboardist Henri "Trollhorn" Sorvali and bassist Sami "Tundra" Uusitalo, creating the first stable line-up. The band's first demo, Rivfader, was released that year.

Their second album, Jaktens Tid, was released in 2001. The following summer, the band played festivals in Finland and other countries. The album features yoiking by then Shaman vocalist Jonne Järvelä, later known as vocalist and guitarist for folk metal band Korpiklaani.

The year after the release of Jaktens Tid, Finntroll had to cancel some tours, and vocalist Jämsen left the band due to a viral-based tumor in his vocal cords, which could not be removed surgically. He retired after the release of the EP Visor om slutet. The EP was recorded in early January 2003, in a forest cabin near Helsinki. It was an "acoustical experiment", where Jämsen and new vocalist Tapio Wilska (of Sethian and Lyijykomppania) shared vocals. Visor om slutet was released as a mid-price EP and held rank on the Finnish midprice chart for several weeks.

On 16 March 2003, shortly before the release of Visor om slutet, guitarist Teemu Raimoranta died when he fell off a bridge in Hakaniemi, Helsinki. After losing their last remaining founding members, the band continued touring Europe for two weeks, supported by the band Katatonia. Guitarist Mikael Karlbom was hired as a replacement for Raimoranta.

In 2004, the band released Trollhammaren ("The Trollhammer"), a prequel to the soon-to-follow album Nattfödd ("Nightborn"). Also in 2004, Sorvali stopped touring with the band, temporary musicians filling in for the remainder of the tour. Aleksi "Virta" Virta joined the band in an official capacity as second keyboardist in 2005.

On 29 January 2006, Tapio Wilska, vocalist of the band since 2003, was fired from the band. In a statement issued on the band's website, Wilska stated that he would like to keep the reason for his dismissal private. The band hired Mathias "Vreth" Lillmåns of Chthonian and Twilight Moon as his replacement and full-time member on vocals.

A new album, titled Ur jordens djup ("From the Depths of the Earth"), was released March 2007. This fourth album put more emphasis on epic keyboard riffs with very loud but melodic guitar. Former vocalist Katla was brought in to write the lyrics for this album, and continues in this capacity with the band. The last song contains an acoustic hidden track entitled Trollvisan which can be heard at 11:03 minutes. It is commonly believed to be the installment's "Aamund och Kettil song", yet there is no mention of the two priests in the lyrics, the song rather refers to "de kristna" ("the Christians") in general.

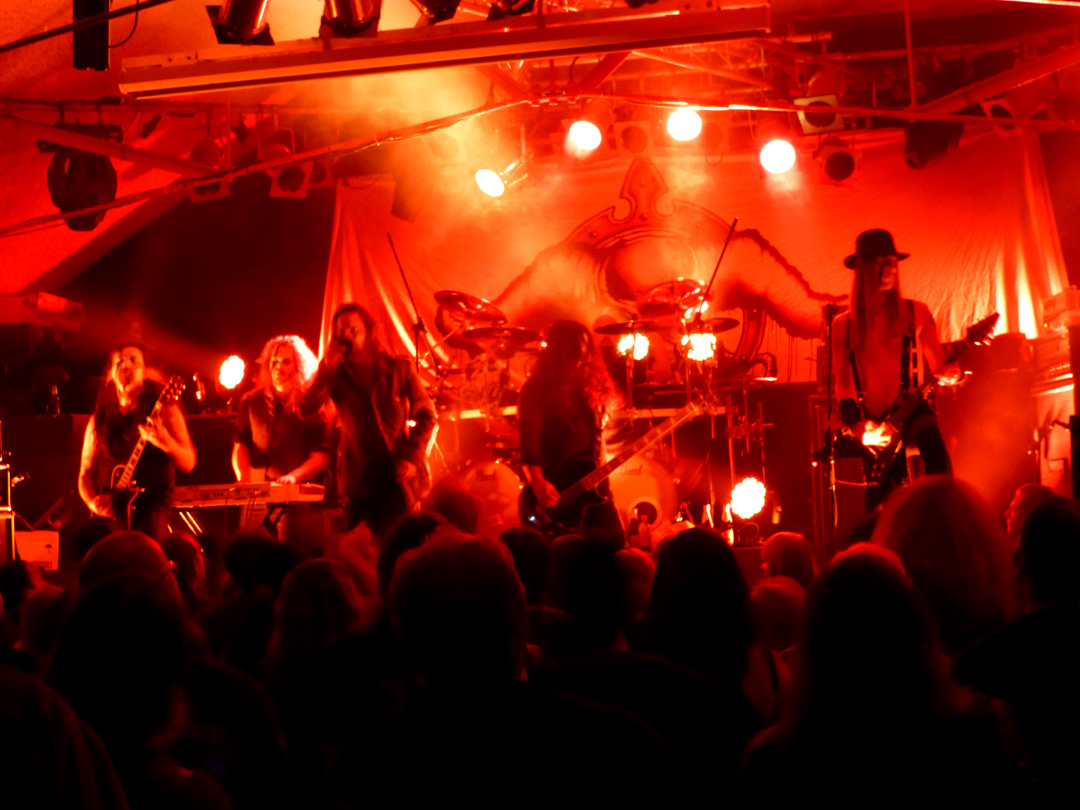
Finntroll perform live at Bilston, Wolverhampton in October 2013

The band has recorded a live performance for its upcoming first live DVD. A release date is yet to be confirmed. They have released their fifth album, titled Nifelvind ("Underworld's Winds"), and Katla has again written the lyrics. The progress on the album was recorded by Trollhorn in a studio diary. On 15 January 2010 Finntroll released a music video for the new song "Solsagan" on their MySpace page in preparation for the album release. The new album was then released in February 2010.

The band's sixth studio album Blodsvept was released on 25 March 2013.

On 13 May 2014, drummer Samu Ruotsalainen revealed that he would be departing the band in July of that year; the parting was confirmed to be amicable by the band. He was replaced by Heikki "Mörkö" Saari.

In June 2014, the band released a live album, Natten med de Levande Finntroll ("Night of the Living Finntroll"). Thomas Woroniak of RockRevolt Magazine stated "Natten Med De Levande Finntroll is a must-have for any dedicated Finntroll fan. Followers of the group have been waiting a long time for a live recording...the music is unique and vibrant in color and tonality, and the performance is exceptional."

On 25 June 2020, the band announced that their next album, titled Vredesvävd, would be released on 18 September.

In January 2026, the band announced that vocalist Vreth would be taking a break due to health-related reasons, and that Mathias “Kistelach” Dahlsveen (Vanvidd) would handle vocals on the band’s winter tour in Finland and Europe.

== Artistry ==
=== Band name ===
According to band members Vreth and Skrymer, they took their name from an old Finnish legend where Swedish priests coming to Finland had an encounter with a wild-looking man who killed most of their party. The survivors came back bearing the tale of the Finn-Troll.

=== Lyrics ===
Finntroll's lyrics mainly deal with legends and tales revolving around the fictional troll-king "Rivfader" and the trolls fighting against the Christians who entered their lands and spread their beliefs. A recurring theme is the story of two priests named "Aamund" and "Kettil": the first three full-length albums feature a rather short but fierce song about the two men who constantly get themselves into trouble with the trolls, only to get beaten up and mutilated over and over again by the wrathful followers of Rivfader.

== Band members ==
Finntroll, band members at Rockharz 2026

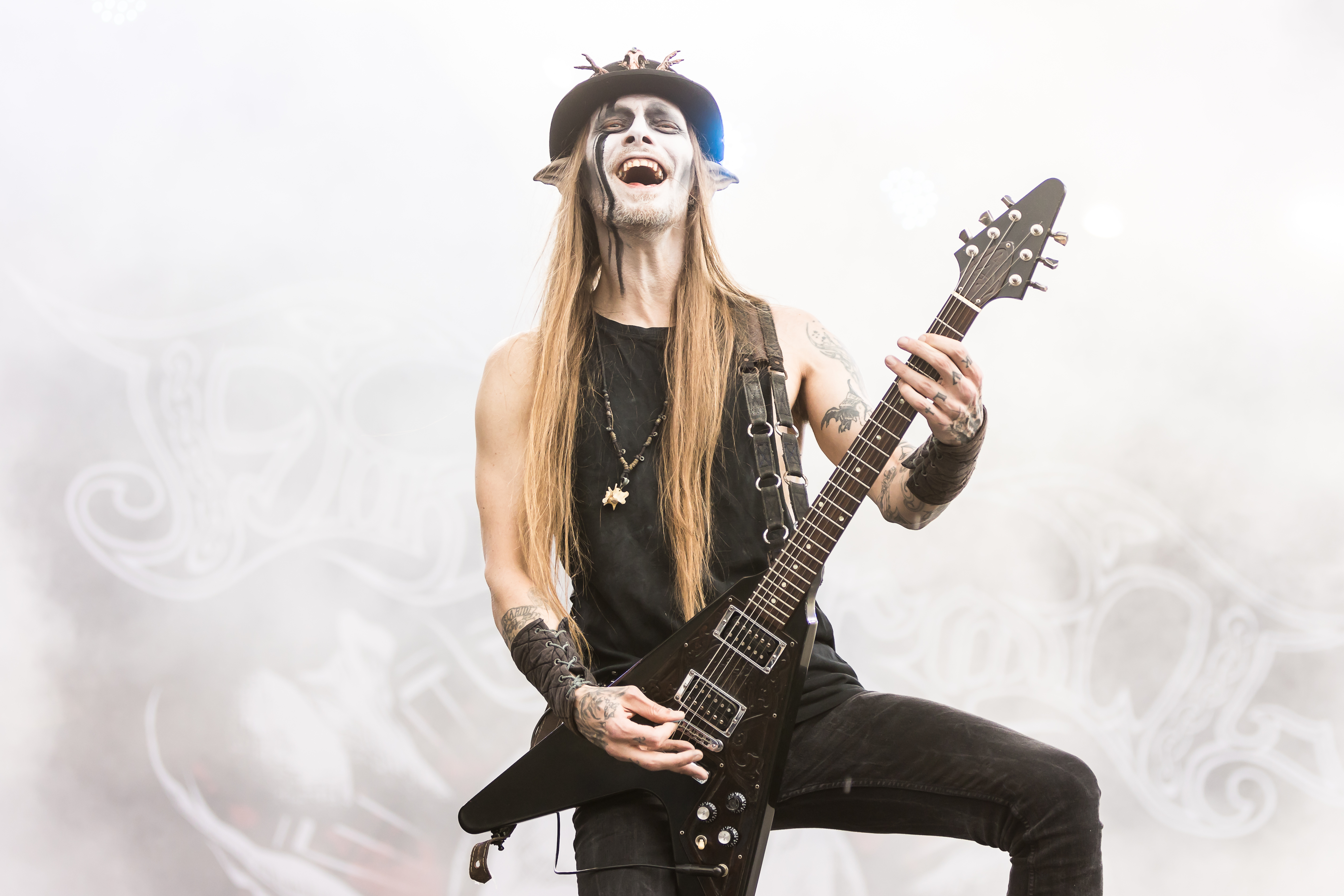
Samuli "Skrymer" Ponsimaa, rhythm guitar

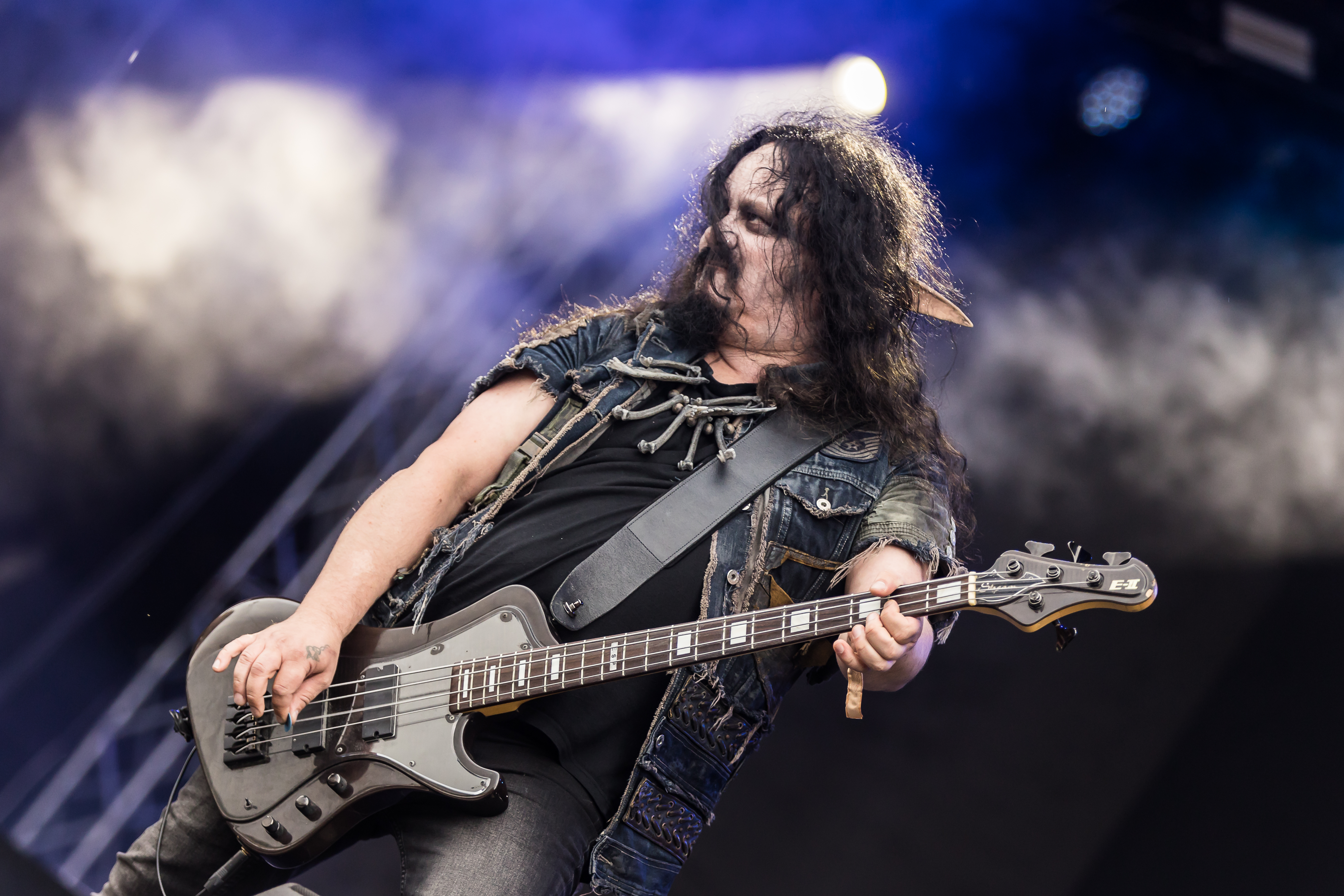
Sami "Tundra" Uusitalo, bass

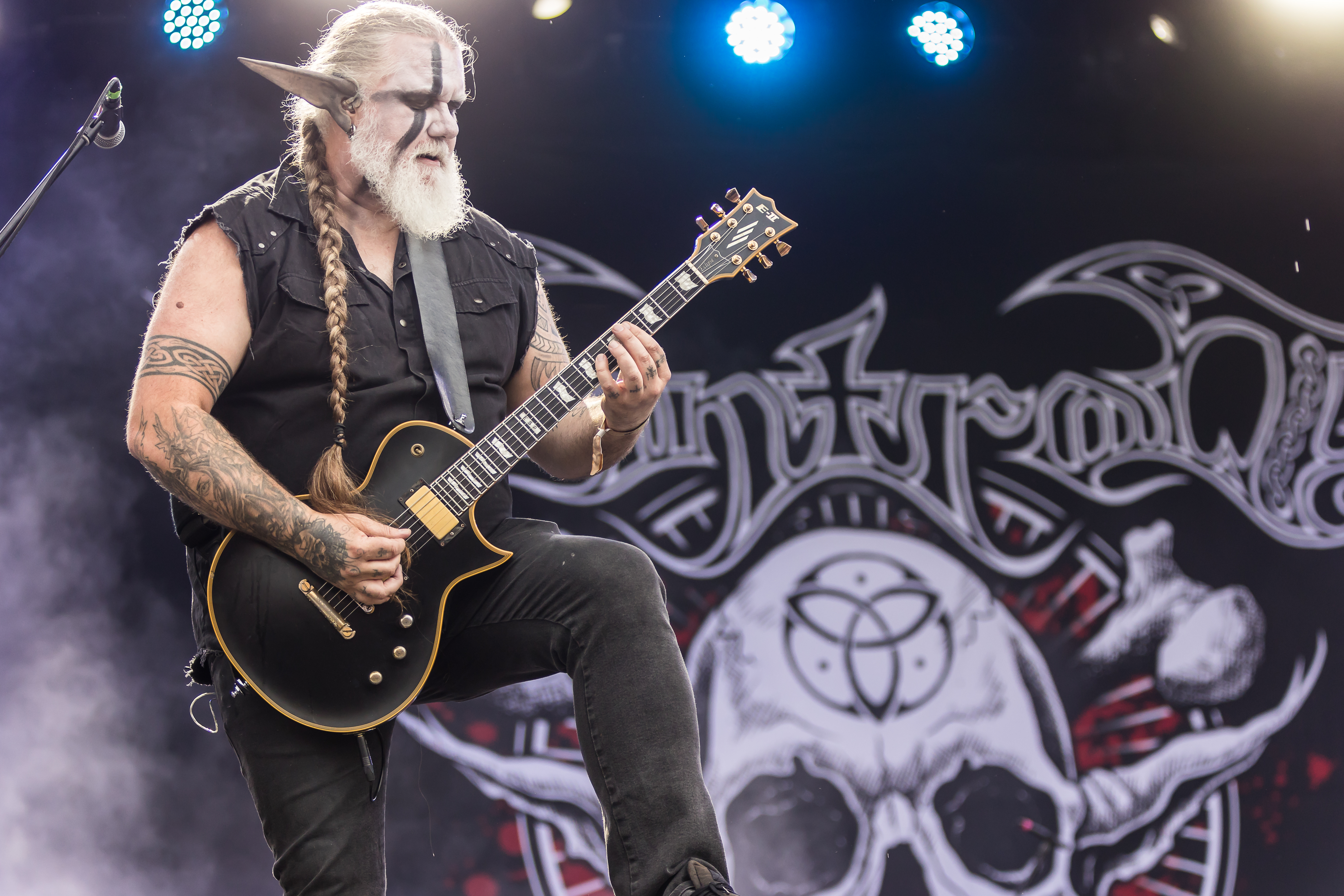
Mikael "Routa" Karlbom, guitar

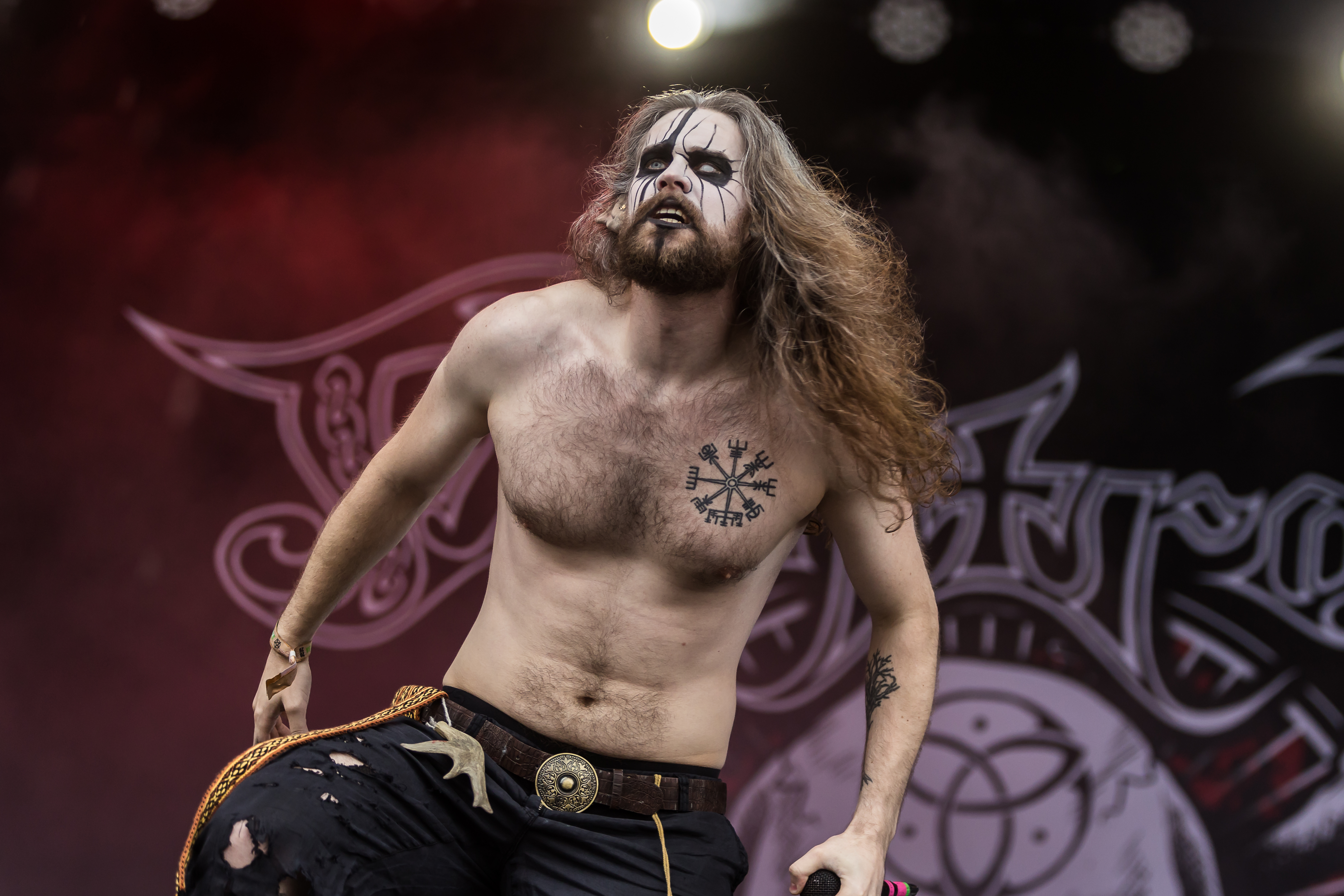
Mathias "Kistelach" Dahlsveen, vocals (tour vocalist)

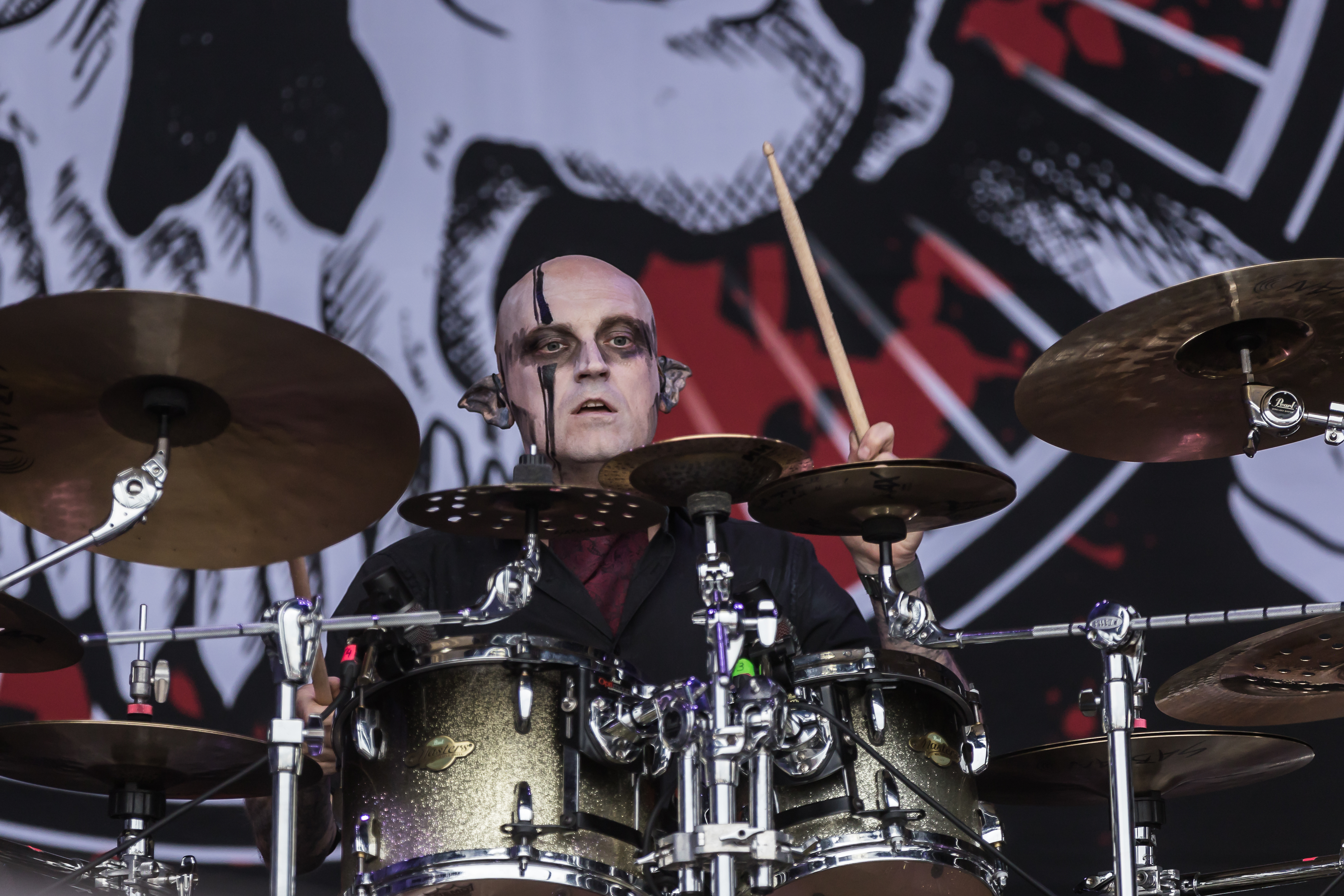
Heikki "MörkÖ" Saari, drums

Current

- Samuli "Skrymer" Ponsimaa – guitar (1997–present)
- Henri "Trollhorn" Sorvali – keyboards, guitars (1998–present; studio-only from 2004)
- Sami "Tundra" Uusitalo – bass (1998–present)
- Mikael "Routa" Karlbom – guitar (2003–present)
- Aleksi Virta – keyboards (2005–present)
- Mathias "Vreth" Lillmåns – vocals (2006–present)
- Heikki "Mörkö" Saari – drums (2014–present)

Touring

- Meiju Enho – keyboards (2004–2005; toured in place of Trollhorn)
- Brandon Ellis (Arsis) – guitars (2013–2014; toured in place of Skrymer)
- Felipe Muñoz – keyboards (2016–present)
- Mathias "Kistelach" Dahlsveen – vocals (2026; toured in place of Vreth)

Former

- Mikael "Ancient Lord" Harju – bass (1997–1998)
- Jan "Katla" Jämsen – vocals (1997–2003), keyboards (1997–1998), lyrics (1997–2003, 2006–present)
- Rauno "Nattvind" Raimoranta – drums, keyboards (1997–1998)
- Teemu "Somnium" Raimoranta – guitar (1997–2003; died 2003)
- Tomi "Grönt Helvetes Kungen" Ullgren – guitar (1997–1998)
- Samu "Beast Dominator" Ruotsalainen – drums (1998–2014)
- Tapio Wilska – vocals, lyrics (2003–2006)

== Discography ==
=== Studio albums ===
| Title | Album details | Peak chart positions | | | | | | |
| Title | Album details | FRA | FIN | SWE | GER | BEL (WA) | AUT | US Heat. |
|---|---|---|---|---|---|---|---|---|
| Midnattens widunder | Released: 1999; Label: Spinefarm Records; Formats: CD, LP, CS | — | — | — | — | — | — | — |
| Jaktens tid | Released: 18 September 2001; Label: Spinefarm Records; Formats: CD, LP, CS, digital download | — | 20 | — | — | — | — | — |
| Nattfödd | Released: 19 April 2004; Label: Spinefarm Records; Formats: CD, LP, digital download | — | 22 | — | — | — | — | — |
| Ur jordens djup | Released: 28 March 2007; Label: Spinefarm Records; Formats: CD, DualDisc, LP, digital download | — | 23 | — | 91 | — | — | — |
| Nifelvind | Released: 17 February 2010; Label: Century Media Records; Formats: CD, LP, digital download | 151 | 35 | 49 | 31 | — | 61 | — |
| Blodsvept | Released: 22 March 2013; Label: Century Media Records; Formats: CD, LP, digital download | 176 | 10 | 40 | 73 | 137 | — | 20 |
| Vredesvävd | Released: 18 September 2020; Label: Century Media Records; Formats: CD, LP, digital download | — | 6 | — | 32 | 107 | 40 | — |
"—" denotes a recording that did not chart or was not released in that territory.

=== EPs ===
| Title | Album details | Peak chart positions |
| Title | Album details | FIN |
|---|---|---|
| Visor om slutet | Released: 30 April 2003; Label: Spinefarm Records; Formats: CD, LP, digital download | 1 |
| Trollhammaren | Released: 13 April 2004; Label: Spinefarm Records; Formats: CD, digital download | 10 |
| Blodsvept EP | Released: 28 February 2013; Label: Devil Inc. Presseverlag; Formats: digital download | — |
"—" denotes a recording that did not chart or was not released in that territory.

=== Live albums ===
| Title | Album details |
|---|---|
| Natten med de levande Finntroll | Released: 13 June 2014; Label: Spinefarm Records; Formats: CD, digital download |

=== Music videos ===
| Year | Title | Directed | Album |
|---|---|---|---|
| 2004 | "Trollhammaren" | Mikael Karlbom | Nattfödd |
| 2007 | "Nedgång" | Tuomas Valtanen / Reactor Films | Ur jordens djup |
| 2010 | "Solsagan" | Vasara Films | Nifelvind |
| 2010 | "Under bergets rot" | — | Nifelvind |
| 2012 | "Ett norrskensdåd" | — | Nifelvind |
| 2013 | "Häxbrygd" | — | Blodsvept |
| 2020 | "Forsen" | Jan Andersson & Jessica Koivistoinen | Vredesvävd |
| 2020 | "Mask" | — | Vredesvävd |
