= Shape of Despair =

Finnish funeral doom metal band

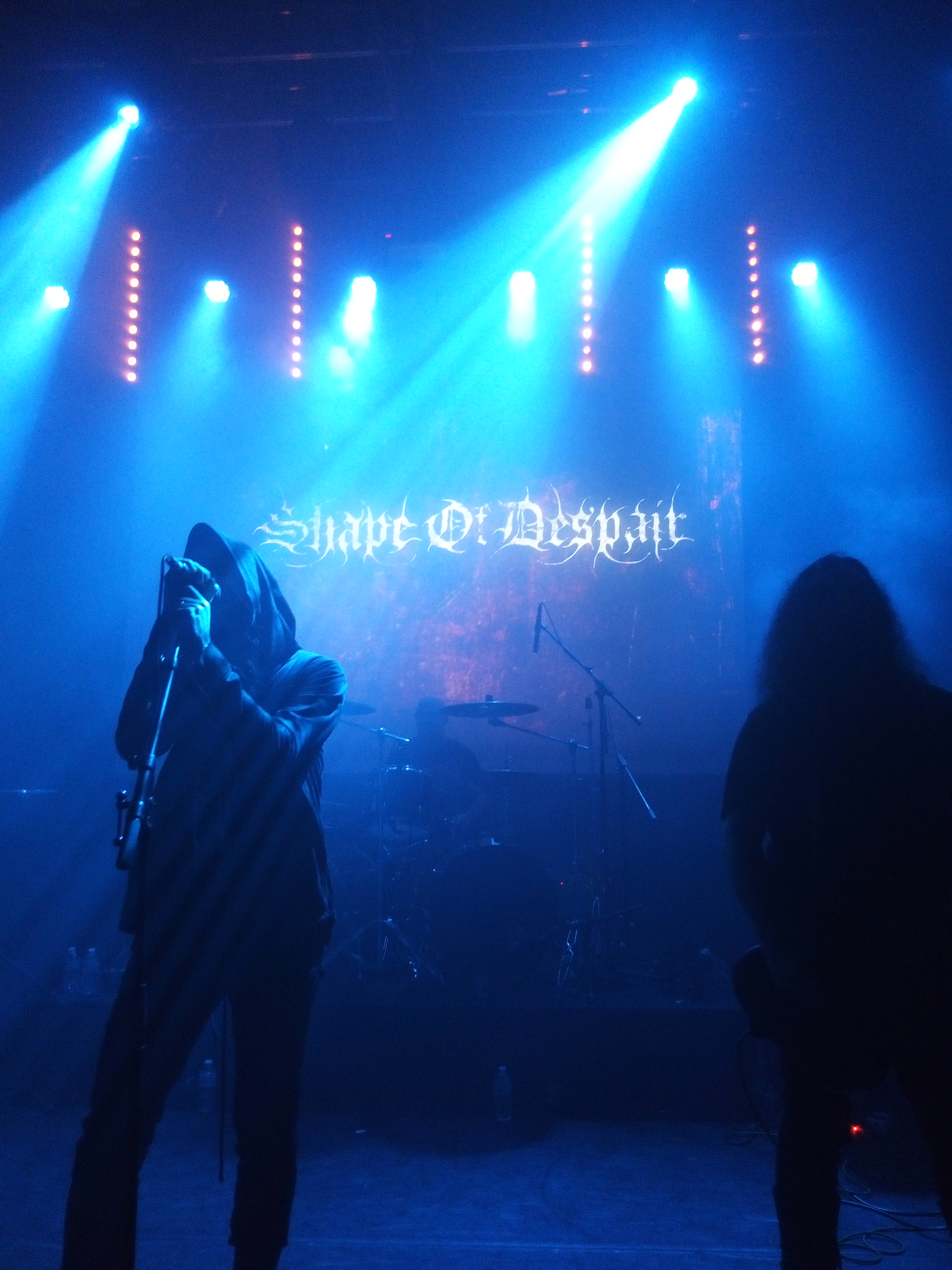

Background information
- Also known as: Raven (1995–1998)
- Origin: Helsinki, Finland
- Genre: Funeral doom metal
- Years active: 1995–present
- Labels: Spikefarm (2000–2005); Season Of Mist (2005–2010, 2012–present); Solarfall (2010); Avantgarde Music (2011)
- Members: Jarno Salomaa; Tomi Ullgrén; Natalie Koskinen; Sami Uusitalo; Henri Koivula; Daniel Neagoe
- Past members: Toni Mäensivu; Pasi Koskinen; Samu Ruotsalainen

Shape of Despair is a funeral doom band from Finland.

== History ==
The band was founded in 1995 as Raven by Jarno Salomaa (guitars, later also keyboards), Tomi Ullgrén (bass, later guitars) and Toni "Otso" Mäensivu (drums, later vocals). They aspired to play faster, instrumental black metal influenced music following the footsteps of their contemporaries like Strid, Burzum, Darkthrone and Unholy. However, the trio soon decided that the music they played was not as good as they wanted it to be, feeling that it lacked the atmosphere and emotion of the bands that influenced them.

During the summer of 1995, Raven recorded their rehearsals on cassette tapes, capturing all the songs that later became the Alone In The Mist demo. After listening to the tape, Raven decided it was good enough to record the tracks in a professional studio. Three years later, Raven entered Arkki-studio. They postponed practicing vocals until the last minute and were surprised at how well Mäensivu's vocals fit their music. The Alone In The Mist demo was not released until 2016.

The band changed their name in September 1998 to Shape of Despair, in part to distinguish themselves from a UK hard rock band of the same name. Additionally, they believed their new moniker better reflected their sound.

In 2000, they signed a deal with Spikefarm Records and released their debut album Shades of... with Samu Ruotsalainen on drums.

The second album Angels of Distress, released in September 2001, featured Pasi Koskinen on lead vocals. Sami Uusitalo joined in 2002 to play bass for the third album Illusion's Play (2004).

In 2005, the band released a compilation titled Shape of Despair, featuring rare and unreleased material from the group, including tracks from the band's first demo Alone in the Mist and a new song called “Sleeping Murder”. The album was recorded over a four-day period at Sundicoop Studios in Savonlinna, Finland. After a 5-year lull the band released the EP Written in My Scars and a split EP with Before The Rain.

In 2011, Henri Koivula took over vocals from Koskinen. Due in part to band members’ competing commitments to other musical projects, there was an 11 year gap between Illusion’s Play and their next full-length album, Monotony Fields. Additionally, the instruments were recorded separately and months apart. Released on June 15, 2015, by Season of Mist, Monotony Fields was hailed by one reviewer as “a great come back” and their best album so far.

In 2022, they released Return to the Void, which featured almost an hour of music. Some reviewers praised the beauty and artistry of the music but commented that the sound was too monotonous.

== Members ==
=== Current members ===
- Jarno Salomaa – lead guitars (1995–present), keyboards (1998–present)
- Tomi Ullgrén – rhythm guitars (1998–present), bass (1995–2002)
- Natalie Koskinen (formerly known as Natalie Safrosskin) – vocals (1998–present)
- Sami Uusitalo – bass (2002–present)
- Henri Koivula – vocals (2011–present)
- Samu Ruotsalainen – drums (1999–2015, 2020–present)

=== Former members ===
- Toni Mäensivu – drums (1995–1999), vocals (1998–2001)
- Pasi Koskinen – vocals (2001–2010)
- Daniel Neagoe – drums (2015–2019)

== Discography ==
=== Albums ===
- Shades of... (2000 - Spikefarm Records, Reissued in 2006 by Season of Mist)
- Angels of Distress (September 25, 2001 - Spikefarm Records, Relapse Records)
- Illusion's Play (September 27, 2004 - Spikefarm Records, Reissued in 2005 by Season of Mist)
- Monotony Fields (June 15, 2015 - Season of Mist)
- Return to the Void (February 25, 2022 - Season of Mist)

=== EPs ===
- Written in My Scars (October 31, 2010 - Solarfall Records)
- Shape of Despair / Before the Rain (June 30, 2011 - Avantgarde Music)

=== Compilation albums ===
- Shape of Despair (August 3, 2005 - Spikefarm Records, Reissued in 2006 by Season of Mist)

=== Demos ===
- Rehearsal I (1995, as Raven, instrumental demo with 2 songs)
- Rehearsal II (1995, as Raven, instrumental demo with 5 songs)
- Alone In The Mist (recorded in 1998 as Raven, though never officially released as Raven, released in 2016 by Season of Mist under Shape Of Despair)
- Promo 1998 (1998, as Raven)
