= Mathias Lillmåns =

Vreth
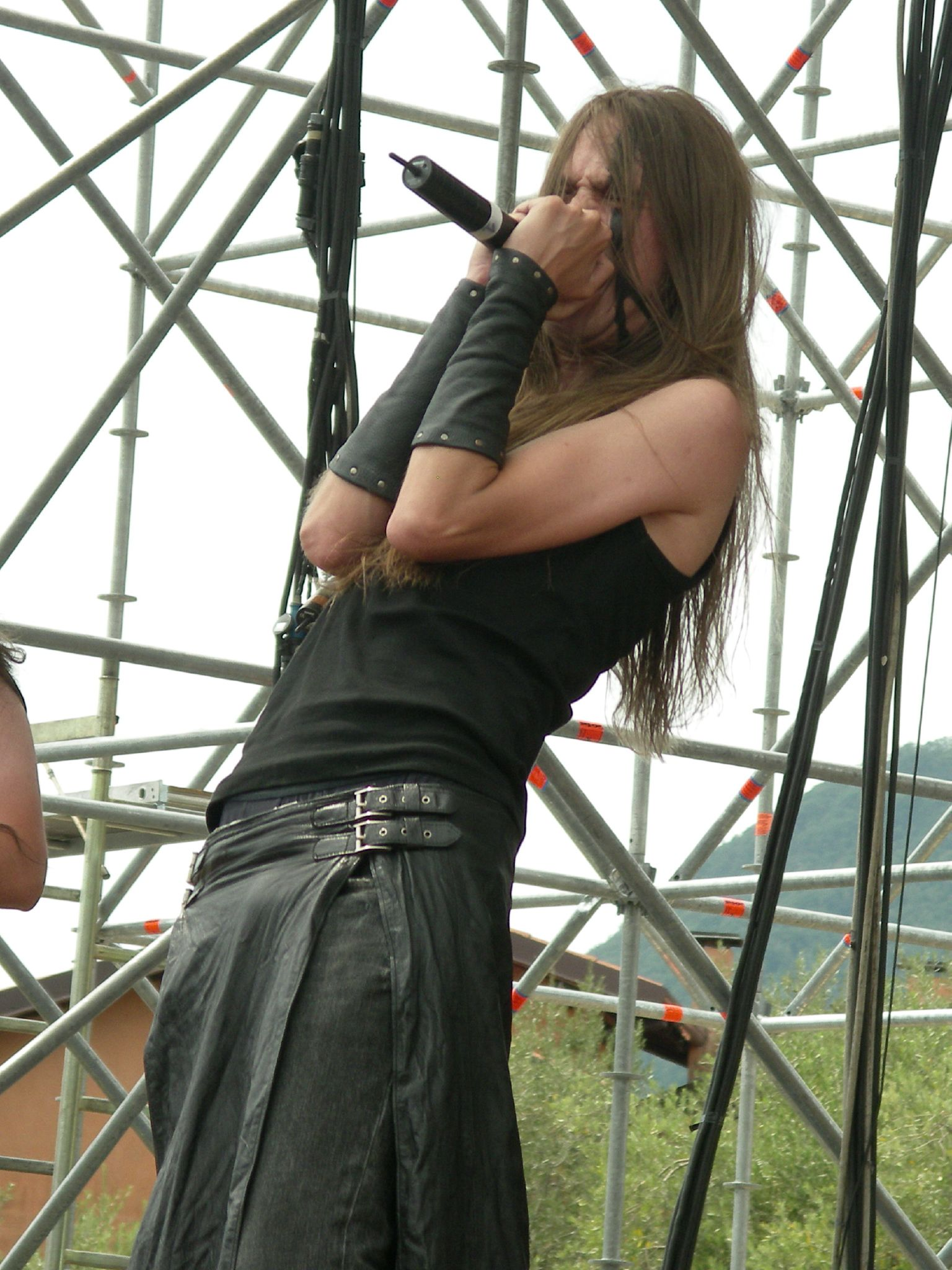
- Vreth with Finntroll in 2006

Background information
- Also known as: Vreth
- Born: 30 August 1982 (age 43)
- Origin: Jakobstad, Finland
- Genres: Folk metal, black metal, death metal
- Occupations: Musician, singer-songwriter
- Instruments: Vocals, bass, guitar
- Years active: 1996–present

Mathias "Vreth" Lillmåns is a Finnish heavy metal singer and songwriter who is the vocalist for the Finnish folk metal band Finntroll, and has been since 2006. He is also the vocalist and the bassist for the bands Chthonian and Twilight Moon. In 2009 he and fellow Finntroll member Samuli Ponsimaa formed the death metal band DecomposteR, in which he is the vocalist and bassist.

== Discography ==
=== with Finntroll ===
- Ur jordens djup (2007)
- Nifelvind (2010)
- Blodsvept (2013)
- Vredesvävd (2020)

=== with Chthonian ===
- Of Beatings and the Silence in Between (2007)
- The Preachings of Hate Are Lord (2010)

=== with The Iniquity Descent ===
- The Human Apheresis (2012)

=== with ...And Oceans ===
- Cosmic World Mother (2020)

=== with Alestorm ===
- Curse of the Crystal Coconut (2020)
