= Teemu Raimoranta =

Finnish musician (1977–2003)

- Also known as: Somnium
- Born: 19 May 1977
- Died: 16 March 2003 (aged 25) Helsinki, Finland
- Genres: Folk metal, black metal
- Occupation: Musician
- Instruments: Guitar, Vocals
- Years active: 1995-2003
- Labels: Spikefarm/Spinefarm, Osmose

Teemu Valtteri (Somnium) Raimoranta (19 May 1977 – 16 March 2003) was a Finnish metal musician. He was the founding guitarist of Finnish folk metal band Finntroll along with vocalist Jan "Katla" Jämsen. He was active in Finntroll as a guitarist until his death in 2003. He also played in Thy Serpent, Barathrum, and Impaled Nazarene.

Raimoranta died on 16 March 2003 after falling from the Kaisaniemi bridge in Helsinki while intoxicated. His death occurred shortly after his involvement in Finntroll's completion of Visor Om Slutet, which was dedicated to his memory.

== Discography ==
=== Thy Serpent ===
- Into Everlasting Fire Demo (1995)

=== Sacred Circle ===
- Nocturnal Burn Demo (1996)

=== Barathrum ===
- Saatana (1999)
- Okkult (2000)

=== Finntroll ===
- Rivfader Demo (1998)
- Midnattens Widunder (1999)
- Jaktens Tid (2001)
- Visor Om Slutet (2003)

=== Impaled Nazarene ===
- Absence of War Does Not Mean Peace (2001)
