= Angels of Distress =

Studio album by Shape of Despair
- Released: September 25th, 2001
- Recorded: April/July, 2001 at HellHole Studio
- Genres: Funeral doom metal Gothic metal Ethereal wave
- Length: 54:54
- Label: Spikefarm Records
- Producers: Kaide Hinkkala; Antti Lindell; Jarno Salomaa

Shape of Despair chronology
Shades of... (2000)	Angels of Distress (2001)	Illusion's Play (2004)

Professional ratings
Review scores
Source	Rating
Allmusic	4/5 stars

Angels of Distress is the second studio album by funeral doom metal band Shape of Despair. It was mastered in Finnvox by Mika Jussila. The album is packaged in a digipak and includes no booklet, though the lyrics can be viewed on the band's official website.

== Track listing ==
1. "Fallen" – 6:09
2. "Angels of Distress" – 9:43
3. "Quiet These Paintings Are" – 14:40
4. "...To Live for My Death..." – 17:22
5. "Night's Dew" – 7:00

Music and lyrics by Jarno Salomaa in 1997 and 1999.

== Credits ==
=== Shape of Despair ===
- Jarno Salomaa - lead guitars & synth
- Tomi Ullgren - bass & rhythm guitars
- Natalie Koskinen - female vocals
- Samu Ruotsalainen - drums
- Pasi Koskinen - growled & clean vocals

=== Session musician ===
- Toni Raehalme - violin
