= Jan Jämsen =

Katla
- Born: Jan Mikael Jämsen
- Genres: Folk metal, black metal, viking metal
- Occupations: Musician, songwriter
- Instruments: Vocals, keyboards
- Years active: 1997–2003
- Website: www.finntroll.net

Jan Mikael Jämsen, better known as Katla, is a Finnish songwriter, former singer, and co-founder and singer in the folk metal band Finntroll.

== Finntroll ==
In 1997, Katla and Somnium (the future guitarist of Finntroll) founded a band. Later they recruited four more members to form the first Finntroll line-up. In 1998, they recorded the demo Rivfader and in 1999 their debut album.

In 2001, Finntroll recorded their second album, Jaktens Tid. Before they went in to record their third album, guitarist and co-founder Somnium died by falling from a bridge, but they continued and recorded Visor om Slutet. The album is unique because it is Humppa only, with acoustic guitars instead of electric guitars.

== Tumor ==
On Visor om Slutet, Katla shared vocal duties with Tapio Wilska. After the album he developed a tumor in his vocal folds and quit singing entirely.

== Returning ==
After Visor Om Slutet, Katla's involvement with Finntroll seemed to have ended. However, after Tapio Wilska was fired from the band in 2006, it was announced that Katla would be writing the lyrics for the Ur Jordens Djup album, continuing the band's mythology and the story of the Rivfader. He has since written lyrics for the band's later albums, Nifelvind and Blodsvept.

== Discography ==
=== Demos ===
- Rivfader

=== Studio albums ===
- Midnattens Widunder
- Jaktens Tid
- Visor Om Slutet

=== As lyricist ===
- Ur Jordens Djup
- Nifelvind
- Blodsvept
