= Jarno Salomaa =

Finnish musician

Jarno Salomaa, also credited as J.S., is a Finnish musician. He formed the funeral doom metal group Shape of Despair in 1995 under the name Raven (not to be confused with the NWOBHM band, Raven). Salomaa's first role was guitars and synth in Raven's Alone in the Mist, the first demo they made, although it was not released to the public. Salomaa then appeared on the first demo produced under the name Shape of Despair called Promo Tape 1998. While not a very grand title, the album contains the well-received songs Quiet These Paintings Are and Outro.

An ex-member of the Finnish outfit Rapture, he is also a part of the doom/folk metal band The Mist and the Morning Dew with the roles of acoustic and lead guitars. Salomaa is still member of Shape of Despair, and appears to have no plans of retirement.

== Discography ==
- Wanderer: Surrounded by These Firs (demo 1995)
- Haven in Shadows: Moments of Honour (demo 1997)
- Raven (pre Shape of Despair): Alone in the Mist (demo 1998)
- Raven (pre Shape of Despair): promo tape (1998)
- Rapture: Futile (album, Spikefarm Records 1999)
- Shape of Despair: Shades of... (album, Spikefarm Records 2000)
- Shape of Despair: Angels of Distress (album, Spikefarm Records 2002)
- The Mist and the Morning Dew: s/t (demo '02)
- Shape of Despair: Illusion's Play (album, Spikefarm Records 2004)
- The Mist and the Morning Dew: s/t (Mcd, Vendlus Records 2004)
- Shape of Despair: s/t (album, Spikefarm records 2005)
- Shape of Despair: Entering The Levitation (Compilation, Tribute to Skepticism 2006)
- Shape of Despair "Written in My Scars" (7-inch EP, Solarfall Records 2010)
- Shape of Despair/Before the Rain: split (7-inch EP, Avantgarde Music 2011)
- Clouds: Doliu (album, Independent 2014)
- Clouds: Errata (single, Independent 2015)
- Shape Of Despair: Monotony Fields (album, Season of Mist 2015)
- Clouds: Departe (album, Independent 2016)
- Shape Of Despair: Alone in the Mist (demo, Season of Mist 2016)
- Clouds: "Destin" (EP, 2017)
