= Samuli Ponsimaa =

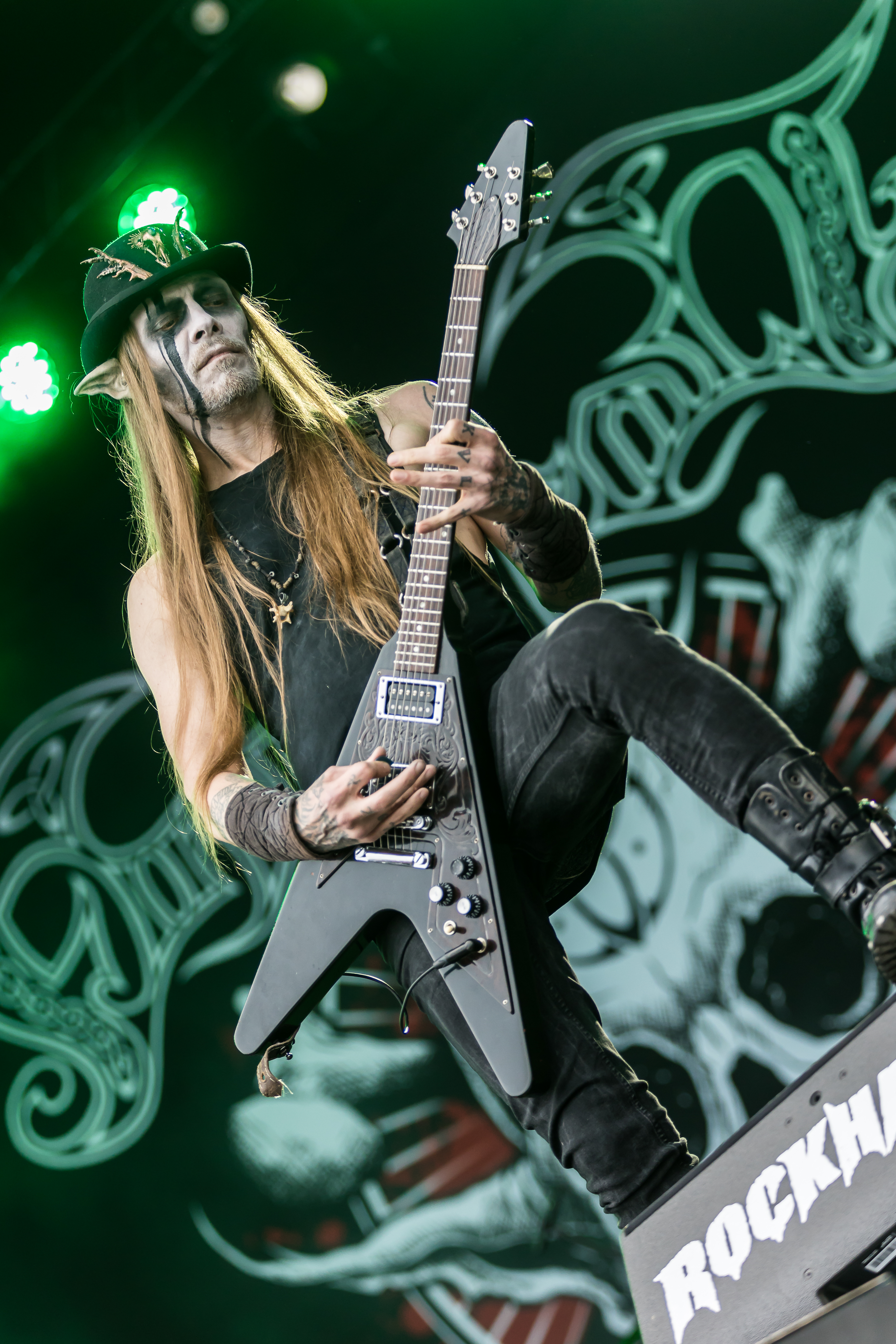
- Samuli Ponsimaa during Finntroll concert on Rockharz festival 2026.

Background information
- Also known as: Skrymer
- Born: 26 August 1977 (age 49)
- Origin: Finland
- Genres: Folk metal, Death metal
- Instrument: Guitar

Samuli Johannes "Skrymer" Ponsimaa is the guitarist in Folk Metal band Finntroll. He is also an artist, and has designed all of the artwork for Finntroll, such as Cover and Booklets, Stage Scenery and Outfits, Merchandise and more. He owns an artwork profile on Facebook and he also works as a tattoo artist at Inkquisition tattoos in Essen. He plays Gibson Guitars. Mostly the Gibson flying v. In 2009 he and fellow Finntroll member Mathias Lillmåns formed the Death Metal band Decomposter, in which he plays the guitar.
