= Sami Uusitalo =

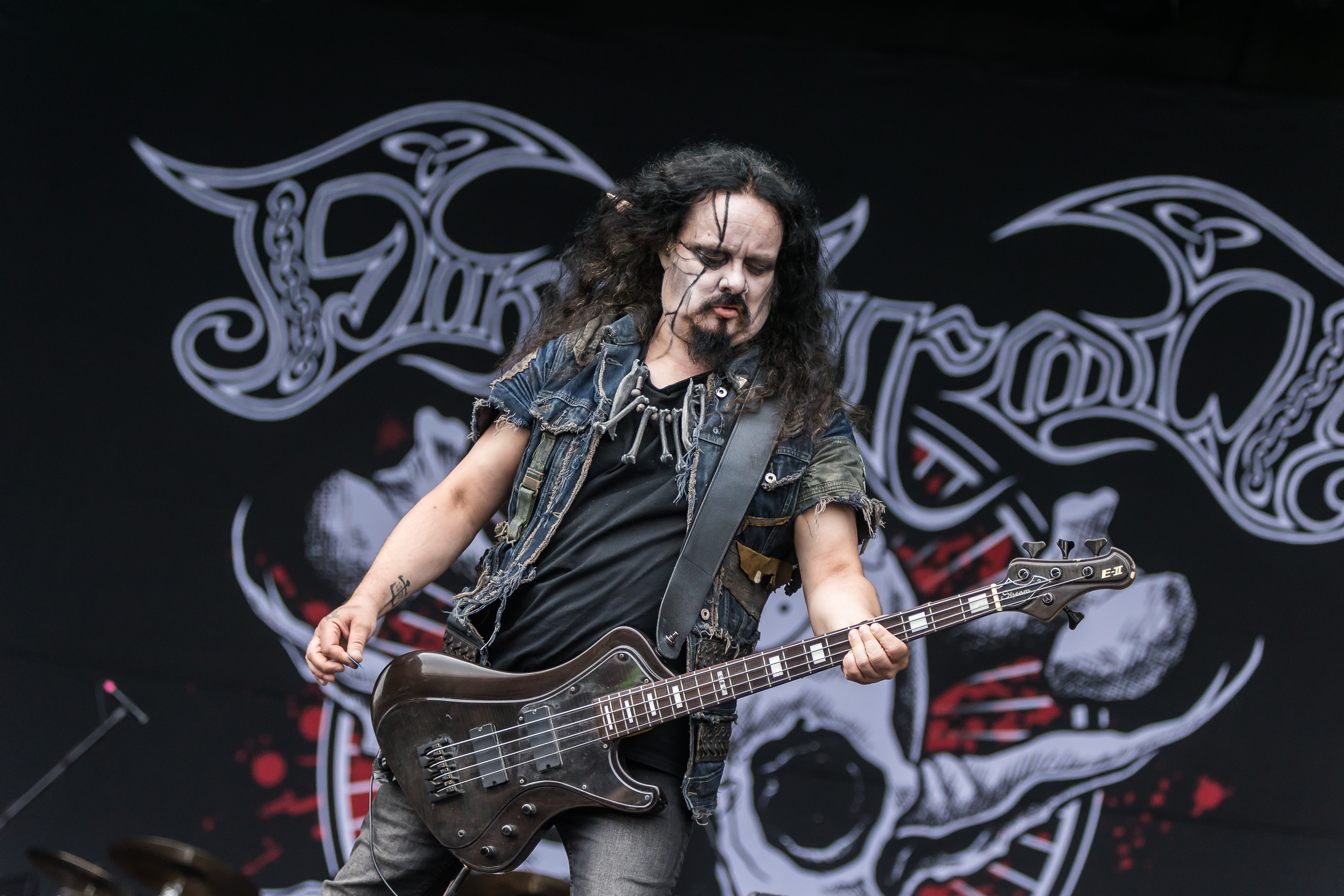
- Sami Uusitalo during Finntroll concert on Rockharz festival 2026.

Background information
- Also known as: Tundra
- Origin: Finland
- Genres: Folk metal
- Instrument: Bass guitar

Sami Antero "Tundra" Uusitalo (born 1977) is a bass guitarist best known from the folk metal band Finntroll and the funeral doom band Shape of Despair. He also plays in the folk/doom metal group The Mist and the Morning Dew.
