= Nether =

Nether may refer to:

- Underworld, a region thought to be beneath the surface of the world in many religions and mythologies
- The Nether, a hell-like dimension in the video game Minecraft
- The Nether, a sci-fi play
- Nether (video game), a first-person multiplayer survival video game for Microsoft Windows

== See also ==
- Kingdom of the Netherlands, a sovereign state with territory in Western Europe and the Caribbean
- Netherlands, a constituent country of the Kingdom of the Netherlands located mostly in Western Europe
- Netherlands (disambiguation)
- Nether region (disambiguation)
- Netherworld (disambiguation)
- The Netherrealm, a hellish world in Mortal Kombat fighting game series
