= Anno 1696 =

Studio album by Insomnium
- Released: 24 February 2023
- Recorded: 2022
- Studios: Sonic Pump Studios (Helsinki, Finland); Teemu Aalto Music Productions (Kotka, Finland)
- Genre: Melodic death metal
- Length: 50:26
- Label: Century Media

Insomnium chronology
Heart Like a Grave (2019)	Anno 1696 (2023)	Netherworlds (2026)

Singles from Anno 1696
- 1. "Lillian" Released: 4 November 2022; 2. "White Christ" Released: 14 December 2022; 3. "The Witch Hunter" Released: 17 January 2023; 4. "Godforsaken" Released: 24 February 2023

Professional ratings
Review scores
Source	Rating
Blabbermouth.net	8.5/10
Metal Injection	8.5/10

Anno 1696 is the ninth studio album by Finnish melodic death metal band Insomnium, released on 24 February 2023 via Century Media. Insomnium began working on the album shortly before the release of Argent Moon, in 2021, with the album originally planned to be released in 2022. Like their 2016 album Winter's Gate, the album is based on a short story by vocalist/bassist Niilo Sevänen, first hinted on October 24, 2022, less than two weeks before the album's official announcement. It is the final release to feature guitarist Jani Liimatainen.

== Release and promotion ==
In April 2023, the band embarked on a North American tour to promote Anno 1696, together with Enslaved, whose album Heimdal released a week after the release of Anno 1696, with support from Black Anvil.

== Track listing ==
All lyrics are written by Niilo Sevänen.

Anno 1696 track listing
No.	Title	Music	Length
1.	"1696"	Markus Vanhala	6:18
2.	"White Christ"	Vanhala	6:03
3.	"Godforsaken"	Vanhala	8:35
4.	"Lilian"	Ville Friman	4:29
5.	"Starless Paths"	Sevänen; Jani Liimatainen	7:48
6.	"The Witch Hunter"	Vanhala	5:43
7.	"The Unrest"	Liimatainen	3:52
8.	"The Rapids"	Vanhala	7:38
Total length:			50:26

Deluxe artbook and Japanese edition bonus CD (Songs of the Dusk EP)
No.	Title	Music	Length
1.	"Flowers of the Night"	Vanhala	5:26
2.	"Stained in Red"	Friman	6:50
3.	"Song of the Dusk"	Sevänen; Vanhala	9:43
Total length:			21:59

== Personnel ==
=== Insomnium ===
- Niilo Sevänen – bass, lead vocals
- Ville Friman – guitars
- Markus Vanhala – guitars, clean vocals
- Jani Liimatainen – guitars, clean vocals
- Markus Hirvonen – drums

=== Additional musicians ===
- Sakis Tolis – guest vocals (track 2)
- Johanna Kurkela – guest vocals (track 3)
- Coen Janssen – keyboards

=== Production and design ===
- Insomnium – production
- Teemu Aalto – recording (acoustic guitars, bass, vocals)
- Jaime Gomez Arellano – recording (drums, acoustic guitars), mixing
- Coen Janssen – recording (keyboards)
- Ville Friman – recording (electric guitars)
- Markus Vanhala – recording (electric guitars)
- Jani Liimatainen – recording (electric guitars)
- Tony Lindgren – mastering
- Sami Makkonen – artwork
- Terhi Ylimäinen – photography
- hafensatz.de – layout

== Charts ==
Chart performance for Anno 1696
Chart (2023)	Peak position
Australian Digital Albums (ARIA)	38
Austrian Albums (Ö3 Austria)	15
Belgian Albums (Ultratop Flanders)	165
Finnish Albums (Suomen virallinen lista)	1
German Albums (Offizielle Top 100)	5
Swiss Albums (Schweizer Hitparade)	10
