= Netherworld =

Netherworld (nether, ″beneath, lower″) may refer to:

- Underworld, a region thought to be beneath the surface of the world in many religions and mythologies

== Film and television ==
- Netherworld (film), a 1992 American horror film
- Nether World, a 1997 film starring Mark Sheppard
- "Netherworld" (The Dead Zone), an episode of The Dead Zone
- Netherworld, the fictional source of all villains in Power Rangers Samurai

== Literature ==
- Netherworld (DC Comics), a fictional autonomous neighborhood of the city of Chicago
- Netherworld (Runelords), an alternate plane of existence in The Runelords novel series by David Farland
- The Nether World, an 1889 novel by George Gissing
- Netherworld (Marvel Comics), in the Marvel Comics universe, a city ruled by Kala
- Netherworld, a fictional collaboration of low-lying countries united to combat the effects of global climate change in the 2021 novel Termination Shock by Neal Stephenson

== Other uses ==
- Netherworld (video game), a 1988 computer game
- Netherworld Haunted House, a walk-through dark attraction established in 1997, in Atlanta, Georgia
- Netherworld, a fictional location in the video game Perfect Cherry Blossom
- The Nether, a dimension in the video game Minecraft
- The Netherworld, a dimension where the Dark Signers originated from, in the anime Yu-Gi-Oh! 5D's
- Netherworlds, parallel universes in the video game Disgaea
- Netherworlds, an album by the band Insomnium

== See also ==
- Hell (disambiguation)
- Nether region (disambiguation)
- Netherlands (disambiguation)
- Spirit world (disambiguation)
