= Johanna Kurkela =

Finnish singer (born 1985)

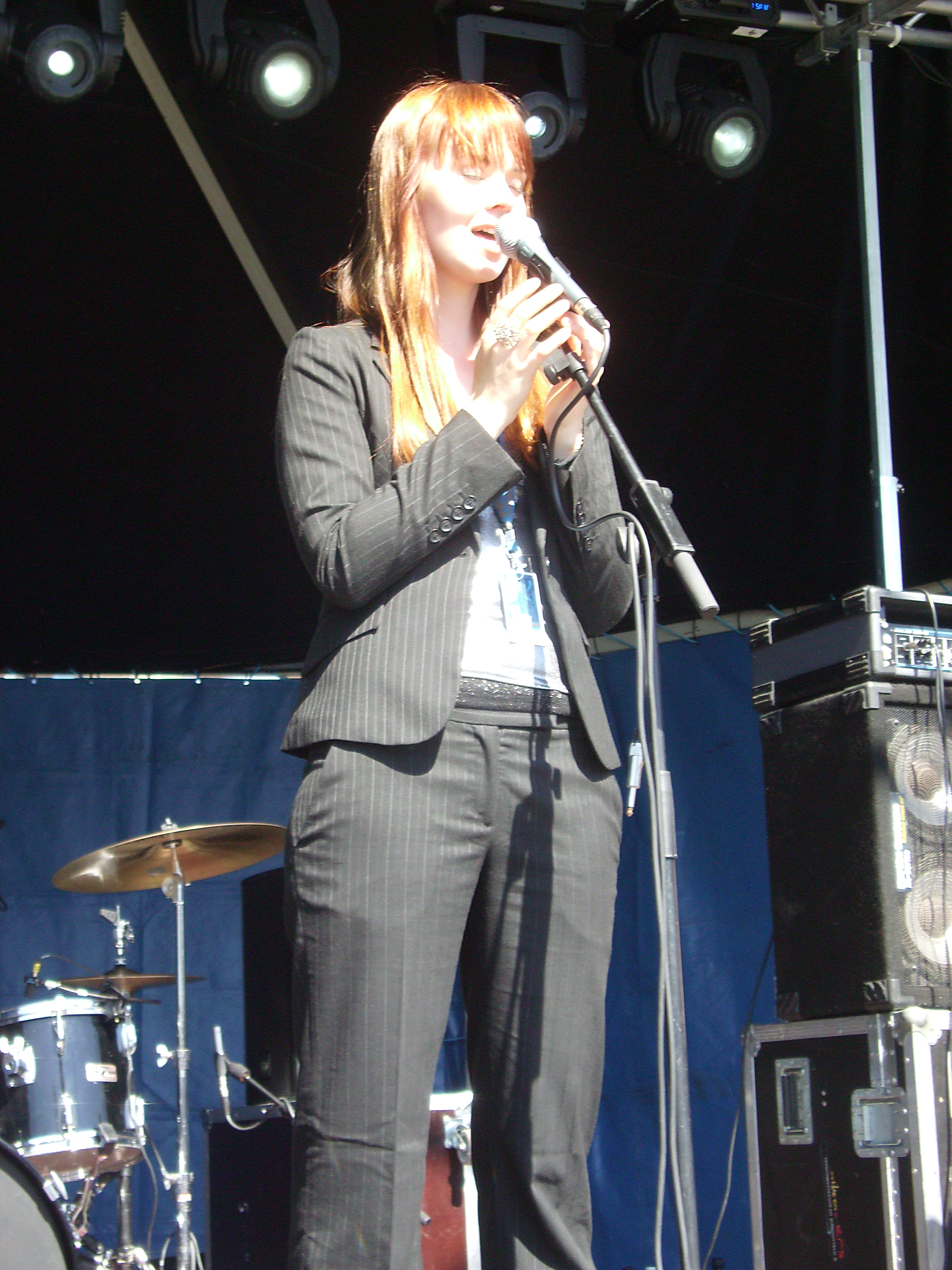

Background information
- Born: 25 April 1985 (age 41); Lumijoki, Finland
- Genres: Contemporary folk music
- Years active: 2004–present
- Labels: Warner Music Finland; Kaiku Recordings
- Spouse: Tuomas Holopainen
- Website: johannakurkela.com

Johanna Kurkela (born 25 April 1985) is a Finnish singer. Her first published work was a duet Tahdon tanssia kanssasi with Tomi Metsäketo in 2004. Kurkela released her first album Hetki hiljaa in 2005. She got a lot of publicity in the Finnish Preselection final for the Eurovision Song Contest 2007, presenting the song Olet uneni kaunein. Kurkela ended up sixth in the preselection final. A few weeks later she published her second album Marmoritaivas. Her 2010 album Hyvästi, Dolores Haze has sold over 20,000 copies.

== Personal life ==
Kurkela was born in Lumijoki. She has been in a relationship with Finnish musician and Nightwish founder and leader Tuomas Holopainen since 2009; they became engaged in 2014 and married on 28 October 2015.

== Musical background ==
Kurkela has a versatile musical background. She studied the violin for seven years from the age of five, and the classical piano from a few years later. She attended secondary school in Oulu at Madetojan musiikkilukio (an upper secondary school, otherwise known as a gymnasium in other parts of Europe) specializing in music.

In addition to singing Kurkela studies in a university of applied sciences.

== Discography ==
=== Albums ===
Studio albums

Year	Album	Peak positions
Year	Album	FIN
2005	Hetki hiljaa	36
2007	Marmoritaivas	3
2008	Kauriinsilmät	10
2010	Hyvästi, Dolores Haze	1
2012	Sudenmorsian	3
2013	Joulun lauluja	8
2015	Ingrid	6

Compilation albums

Year	Album	Peak positions
Year	Album	FIN
2011	Uneni kaunein – Parhaat 2005–2011	7

=== Singles ===
Year	Single	Peak positions	Album
Year	Single	FIN	Album
2005	"Olen sinussa"	–	
2007	"Olet uneni kaunein"	–	
2007	"Sun särkyä anna mä en"	–	
2007	"Marmoritaivas"	–	
2010	"Rakkauslaulu"	15	

=== Collaborative works ===
- 2004: Tomi Metsäketo – Tummaa samettia: Tahdon tanssia kanssasi (duet)
- 2005: Tilkkutäkki 1: Hiljainen kaupunki
- 2006: Tilkkutäkki 2: Kuule minun ääneni
- 2007: Tilkkutäkki 3: Elämä on nyt
- 2009: Sonata Arctica – The Days of Grays (vocals on "Deathaura" and "No Dream Can Heal a Broken Heart")
- 2009: Vesa-Matti Loiri – Hyvää puuta
- 2009: Club for Five – You're The Voice: Nothing Else Matters
- 2014: Music Inspired by the Life and Times of Scrooge (vocals)
- 2018: Auri – Auri (vocals)
- 2018: Korsukylä – Every Green in May & Johanna Kurkela (vocals)
- 2020: Nightwish – Human. :II: Nature. (spoken words on "Shoemaker")
- 2020: Altamullan Road – Altamullan Road (vocals & composition)
- 2021: Auri – II – Those We Don't Speak Of (vocals)
- 2022: Vita Nova (vocals)
- 2022: Eye of Melian - Legends of Light (vocals)
- 2023: Insomnium – Anno 1696 (vocals on "Godforsaken")
- 2025: Auri – III – Candles & Beginnings
- 2026: Eye of Melian - Forest of Forgetting (vocals)
