= Nether region =

Nether region may refer to:

- Hell, the Underworld, or any place of darkness or eternal suffering
- Subterranea (geography)
- Euphemism or slang for the buttocks, groin and genitals of human body, separately or collectively

== See also ==
- Hell (disambiguation)
- Netherlands (disambiguation)
- Netherworld (disambiguation)
- Spirit world (disambiguation)
