= Since the Day It All Came Down =

Studio album by Insomnium
- Released: April 5, 2004
- Recorded: July – September 2003
- Studios: Mediaworks Studios, Joensuu
- Genre: Melodic death metal
- Length: 53:45
- Label: Candlelight
- Producers: Jone Väänänen; Insomnium

Insomnium chronology
In the Halls of Awaiting (2002)	Since the Day It All Came Down (2004)	Above the Weeping World (2006)

Professional ratings
Review scores
Source	Rating
Allmusic	3/5 stars
Sputnikmusic	5/5 stars
Chronicles of Chaos	10/10 stars
Metal Review	(8.3/10)

Since the Day It All Came Down is the second studio album by Finnish melodic death metal band Insomnium, released on 5 April 2004 via Candlelight Records.

== Track listing ==
No.	Title	Lyrics	Music	Length
1.	"Nocturne"	Instrumental	Niilo Sevänen	1:57
2.	"The Day It All Came Down"	Ville Vänni	Ville Friman; Vänni	4:56
3.	"Daughter of the Moon"	Sevänen	Friman; Sevänen	6:09
4.	"The Moment of Reckoning"	Friman	Friman	5:46
5.	"Bereavement"	Friman	Friman	4:15
6.	"Under the Plaintive Sky"	Friman	Friman; Sevänen	4:09
7.	"Resonance"	Instrumental	Friman	2:29
8.	"Death Walked the Earth"	Friman	Friman	5:09
9.	"Disengagement"	Vänni	Friman	8:39
10.	"Closing Words"	Friman	Friman; Vänni	4:25
11.	"Song of the Forlorn Son"	Sevänen	trad.; Sevänen	5:45
Total length:				53:39

== Credits ==
Insomnium

- Niilo Sevänen − vocals, bass guitar
- Ville Friman − guitar
- Ville Vänni − guitar
- Markus Hirvonen − drums

Additional musicians

- All arrangements by Insomnium
- Keyboards by Jone Väänänen except tracks 6 and 11 by Aleksi Munter
- Cellos by Laura Naire

Production and artwork

- Recorded and mixed at Mediaworks Studios, Joensuu, between July and September 2003 by Jone Väänänen, assisted by Timo Pekkarinen
- Mastered at Finnvox by Mika Jussila
- Band photos by Sakari Lindell
- Booklet design and layout by Jarno Lahti at Kaamos
