= In the Halls of Awaiting =

Studio album by Insomnium
- Released: April 30, 2002
- Recorded: August 2001
- Studio: Media Works Studios
- Genre: Melodic death metal
- Length: 55:40
- Label: Candlelight
- Producer: Jone Väänänen

Insomnium chronology
In the Halls of Awaiting (2002)	Since the Day It All Came Down (2004)

In the Halls of Awaiting is the debut studio album by Finnish melodic death metal band Insomnium. It was released on April 30, 2002, through Candlelight Records.

Professional ratings
Review scores
Source	Rating
AllMusic	3.5/5 stars
BraveWords	8/10 stars

== Track listing ==
No.	Title	Lyrics	Music	Length
1.	"Ill-Starred Son"	Niilo Sevänen	Sevänen	4:46
2.	"Song of the Storm"	Ville Friman	Friman	4:22
3.	"Medeia"	Sevänen	Sevänen	4:22
4.	"Dying Chant"	Sevänen	Sevänen	4:13
5.	"The Elder"	Friman	Friman; Sevänen	4:46
6.	"Black Waters"	Friman	Friman; Sevänen	5:00
7.	"Shades of Deep Green"	Ville Vänni	Friman; Sevänen; Vänni	7:33
8.	"The Bitter End"	Sevänen	Sevänen	5:08
9.	"Journey Unknown"	Friman	Friman	4:30
10.	"In the Halls of Awaiting"	Sevänen	Sevänen	11:00
Total length:				55:40

== Credits ==
Insomnium

- Niilo Sevänen − vocals, bass guitar
- Ville Friman − guitar
- Ville Vänni − guitar
- Markus Hirvonen − drums

Additional musicians

- Varpu Vahtera – keyboards

Production & artwork

- Mixed by Anssi Kippo at Astia Studio A
- Mastered by Mika Jussila at Finnvox Studios
- Heikki Kokkonen – photography
- Sakari Lundell – band photos
- Ville Kaisla – booklet design and layout
- Olli-Pekka Suhonen – band logo
