= Terminology of the Low Countries =

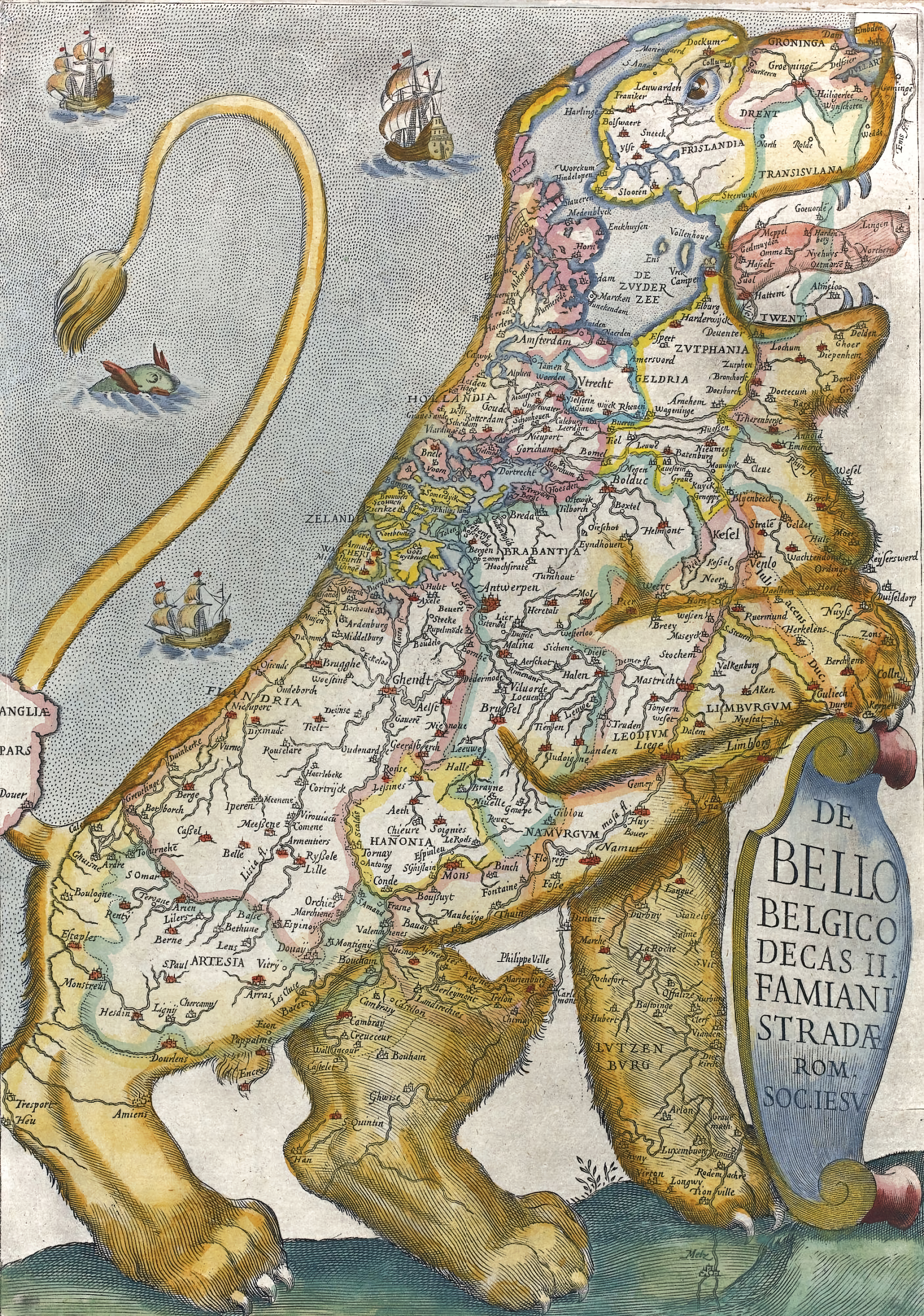
The Low Countries indicated in Latin as Belgico (1647)

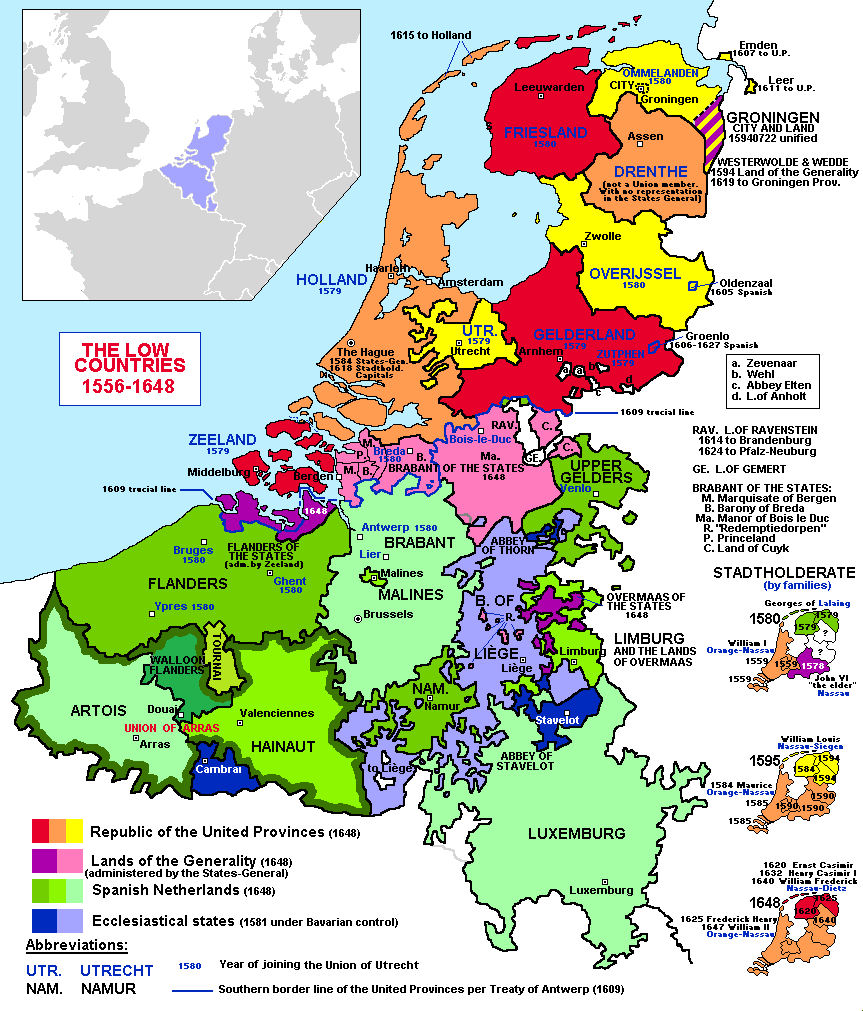
The Low Countries from 1556 to 1648

The Low Countries comprise the coastal Rhine–Meuse–Scheldt delta region in Western Europe, whose definition usually includes the modern countries of Luxembourg, Belgium, the Netherlands and parts of Northern France. Both Belgium and the Netherlands derived their names from earlier names for the region, due to nether meaning "low" and Belgica being the Latinised name for the Low Countries, a nomenclature that became obsolete after Belgium's secession in 1830.

The Low Countries—and the Netherlands and Belgium—had in their history exceptionally many and widely varying names, resulting in equally varying names in different languages. There is diversity even within languages: the use of one word for the country and another for the adjective form is common. This holds for English, where Dutch is the adjective form for the country "the Netherlands". Moreover, many languages have the same word for both the country of the Netherlands and the region of the Low Countries, e.g., French (les Pays-Bas), Spanish (los Países Bajos) and Portuguese (Países Baixos). The complicated nomenclature is a source of confusion for outsiders, and reflects the long history and the frequent changes in ruling power in the Low Countries over the past 2,000 years.

== History ==
The historic Low Countries made up much of Frisia, home to the Frisii, and the Roman provinces of Gallia Belgica and Germania Inferior, home to the Belgae and Germanic peoples like the Batavi. Throughout the centuries, the names of these ancestors have been in use as a reference to the Low Countries, in an attempt to define a collective identity. In the 4th and 5th centuries a Frankish confederation of Germanic tribes significantly made a lasting change by entering the Roman provinces and starting to build the Carolingian Empire, of which the Low Countries formed a core part.

By the 8th century, most of the Franks had exchanged their Germanic Frankish language for the Latin-derived Romances of Gaul. The Franks that stayed in the Low Countries had kept their original language, i.e., Old Dutch, also known as "Old Low Franconian" among linguists. At the time the language was spoken, it was known as *þiudisk, meaning "of the people"—as opposed to the Latin language "of the clergy"—which is the source of the English word Dutch. Now an international exception, it used to have in the Dutch language itself a cognate with the same meaning, i.e., Diets(c) or Duuts(c).

The designation "low" to refer to the region has also been in use many times. First by the Romans, who called it Germania "Inferior". After the Frankish empire was divided several times, most of it became the Duchy of Lower Lorraine in the 10th century, where the Low Countries politically have their origin. Lower Lorraine disintegrated into a number of duchies, counties and bishoprics. Some of these became so powerful, that their names were used as a pars pro toto for the Low Countries, i.e., Flanders, Holland and to a lesser extent Brabant. Burgundian, and later Habsburg rulers added one by one the Low Countries' polities in a single territory, and it was at their francophone courts that the term les pays de par deçà arose, that would develop in Les Pays-Bas or in English "Low Countries" or "Netherlands".

== Names derived from theodisc (vernacular) ==
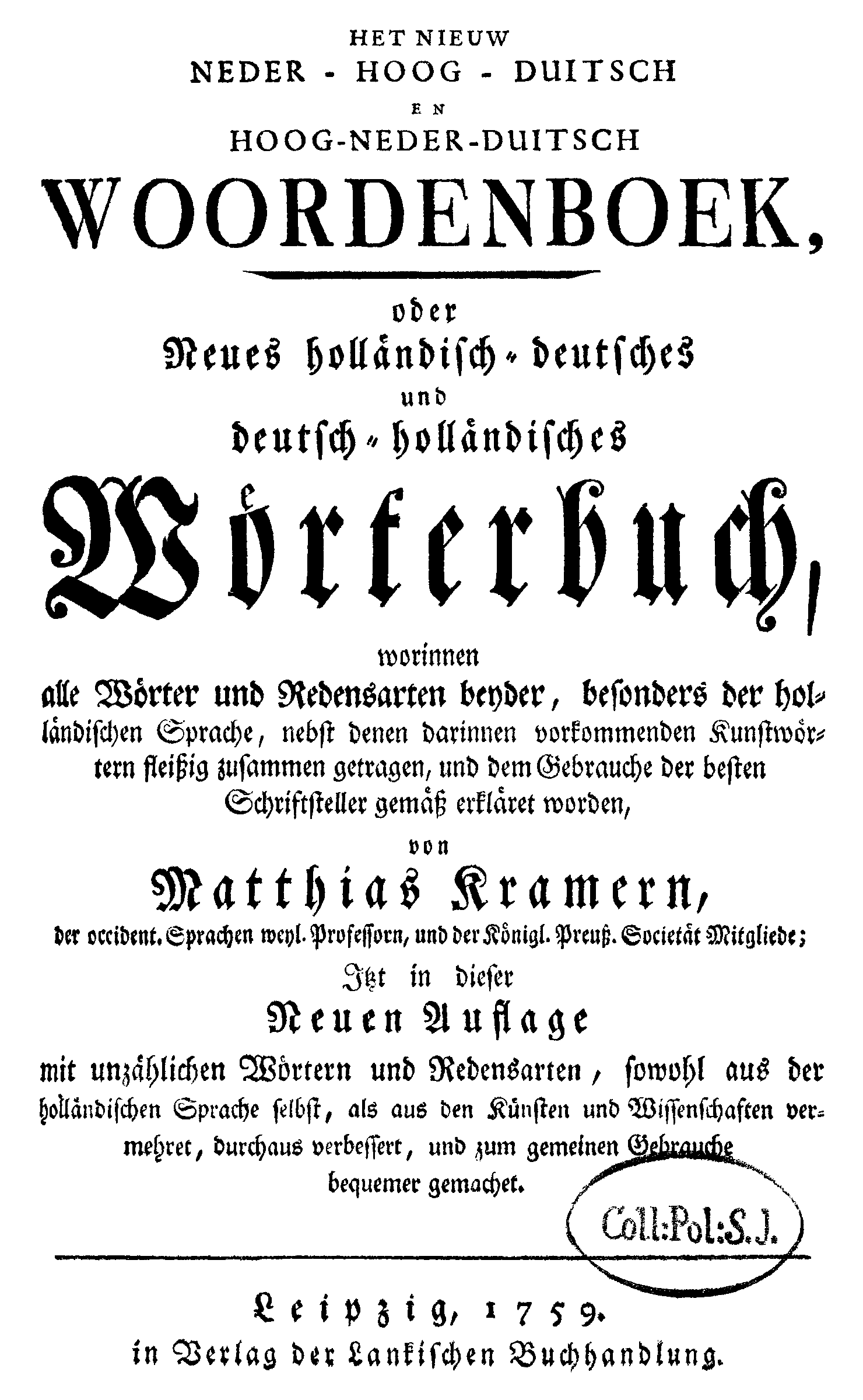
A Dutch-German dictionary. The languages are in Dutch indicated as Nederduitsch ("Dutch") and Hoogduitsch ("German"), while in German as Holländisch and Deutsch respectively (1759).

=== Dutch, Diets and Duyts ===
English is one of the only languages to use the adjective Dutch for the language of the Netherlands and Flanders. Its connection to the vernacular can be traced back to the Early Mediaeval Latin term Theodiscus, meaning 'of the people' or 'popular language.' In the Middle Ages, Theodiscus was used to distinguish the spoken language of the common Germanic folk from Latin, which was the language of the church, science, and administration. It served as a way to categorise languages based on their practical and social functions. The word is derived from Proto-Germanic *þiudiskaz. The stem of this word, *þeudō, meant "people" in Proto-Germanic, and *-iskaz was an adjective-forming suffix, of which -ish is the Modern English form. Theodiscus was its Latinised form.

It was first recorded in 786, when the Bishop of Ostia writes to Pope Adrian I about a synod taking place in Corbridge, England, where the decisions are being written down "tam Latine quam theodisce" meaning "in Latin as well as Germanic". So in this sense theodiscus referred to the Germanic language spoken in Great Britain, which was later replaced by the name Englisc.

By the late 14th century, þēodisc had given rise to Middle English duche and its variants, which were used as a blanket term for all the non-Scandinavian Germanic languages spoken on the European mainland. Historical linguists have noted that the medieval "Duche" itself most likely shows an external Middle Dutch influence, in that it shows a voiced alveolar stop rather than the expected voiced dental fricative. This would be a logical result of the Medieval English wool trade, which brought the English in close linguistic contact with the cloth merchants living in the Dutch-speaking cities of Bruges and Ghent, who at the time, referred to their language as dietsc.

Its exact meaning is dependent on context, but tends to be vague regardless. When concerning language, the word duche could be used as a hypernym for several languages (The North est Contrey which lond spekyn all maner Duche tonge – The North [of Europe] is an area, in which all lands speak all manner of "Dutch" languages) but it could also suggest singular use (In Duche a rudder is a knyght – In "Dutch" a rudder [cf. Dutch: ridder] is a knight) in which case linguistic and/or geographic pointers need to be used to determine or approximate what the author would have meant in modern terms, which can be difficult. For example, in his poem Constantyne, the English chronicler John Hardyng (1378–1465) specifically mentions the inhabitants of three Dutch-speaking fiefdoms (Flanders, Guelders, and Brabant) as travel companions, but also lists the far more general "Dutchemēne" and "Almains", the latter term having an almost equally broad meaning, though being more restricted in its geographical use; usually referring to people and locaties within modern Germany, Switzerland and Austria:

He went to Roome with greate power of Britons strong,
with Flemynges and Barbayns, Henauldes, Gelders, Burgonians, & Frenche,
Dutchemēne, Lubārdes, also many Almains.

— Excerpt from "Constantyne", John Hardyng
Translation:

He went to Rome with a large number of Britons,
with Flemings and Brabanters, Hainuyers, Guelders, Burgundians, and Frenchmen,
"Dutchmen", Lombards, also many Germans.

— J. Rivington, The Chronicle of Iohn Hardyng

By early 17th century, general use of the word Dutch had become exceedingly rare in Great Britain and it became an exonym specifically tied to the modern Dutch, i.e. the Dutch-speaking inhabitants of the Low Countries. Many factors facilitated this, including close geographic proximity, trade and military conflicts, for instance the Anglo-Dutch Wars. Due to the latter, "Dutch" also became a pejorative label pinned by English speakers on almost anything they regard as inferior, irregular, or contrary to their own practice. Examples include "Dutch treat" (each person paying for himself), "Dutch courage" (boldness inspired by alcohol), "Dutch wife" (a type of sex doll) and "Double Dutch" (gibberish, nonsense) among others.

In the United States, the word "Dutch" remained somewhat ambiguous until the start of the 19th century. Generally, it referred to the Dutch, their language or the Dutch Republic, but it was also used as an informal monniker (for example in the works of James Fenimore Cooper and Washington Irving) for people who would today be considered Germans or German-speaking, most notably the Pennsylvania Dutch. This lingering ambiguity was most likely caused by close proximity to German-speaking immigrants, who referred to themselves or (in the case of the Pennsylvania Dutch) their language as "Deutsch" or "Deitsch", rather than archaic use of the term "Dutch".

In the Dutch language itself, Old Dutch *thiudisk evolved into a southern variant duutsc and a western variant dietsc in Middle Dutch, which were both known as duytsch in Early Modern Dutch. In the earliest sources, its primary use was to differentiate between Germanic and the Romance dialects, as expressed by the Middle Dutch poet Jan van Boendale, who wrote:

Want tkerstenheit es gedeelt in tween,
die Walsche tongen die es een,
Dandre die Dietsche al geheel

— Excerpt from Brabantsche Yeesten, by Jan van Boendale (1318)
Translation:

Because Christendom is divided in two parts,
the "Welsh" languages (i.e. Romance languages, compare Walloon) form one,
the other [part] of the whole is "Dutch" (i.e. Germanic)

During the High Middle Ages "Dietsc/Duutsc" was increasingly used as an umbrella term for the specific Germanic dialects spoken in the Low Countries, its meaning being largely implicitly provided by the regional orientation of medieval Dutch society: apart from the higher echelons of the clergy and nobility, mobility was largely static and hence while "Dutch" could by extension also be used in its earlier sense, referring to what today would be called Germanic dialects as opposed to Romance dialects, in many cases it was understood or meant to refer to the language now known as Dutch. Apart from the sparsely populated eastern borderlands, there was little to no contact with contemporary speakers of German dialects, let alone a concept of the existence of German as language in its modern sense among the Dutch. Because medieval trade focused on travel by water and with the most heavily populated areas adjacent to Northwestern France, the average 15th century Dutchman stood a far greater chance of hearing French or English than a dialect of the German interior, despite its relative geographical closeness. Medieval Dutch authors had a vague, generalised sense of common linguistic roots between their language and various German dialects, but no concept of speaking the same language existed. Instead they saw their linguistic surroundings mostly in terms of small scale regiolects.

In the 19th century, the term "Diets" was revived by Dutch linguists and historians as a poetic name for Middle Dutch and its literature.

=== Nederduits ===
In the second half of the 16th century the neologism "Nederduytsch" (lit. 'Nether-Dutch' or 'Low-Dutch') appeared in print, in a way combining the earlier "Duytsch" and "Nederlandsch" into one compound. The term was preferred by many leading contemporary grammarians such as Balthazar Huydecoper, Arnold Moonen and Jan ten Kate because it provided a continuity with Middle Dutch ("Duytsch" being the evolution of medieval "Dietsc"), was at the time considered the proper translation of the Roman Province of Germania Inferior (which not only encompassed much of the contemporary Dutch-speaking area / Netherlands, but also added classical prestige to the name) and amplified the dichotomy between Early Modern Dutch and the "Dutch" (German) dialects spoken around the Middle and Upper Rhine which had begun to be called overlantsch of hoogduytsch (literally: Overlandish, High-"Dutch") by Dutch merchants sailing upriver. Though "Duytsch" forms part of the compound in both Nederduytsch and Hoogduytsch, this should not be taken to imply that the Dutch saw their language as being especially closely related to the German dialects spoken in Southerwestern Germany. On the contrary, the term "Hoogduytsch" specifically came into being as a special category because Dutch travellers visiting these parts found it hard to understand the local vernacular: in a letter dated to 1487 a Flemish merchant from Bruges instructs his agent to conduct trade transactions in Mainz in French, rather than the local tongue to avoid any misunderstandings. In 1571 use of "Nederduytsch" greatly increased because the Synod of Emden chose the name "Nederduytsch Hervormde Kerk" as the official designation of the Dutch Reformed Church. The synods choice of "Nederduytsch" over the more dominant "Nederlandsch", was inspired by the phonological similarities between "neder-" and "nederig" (the latter meaning "humble") and the fact that it did not contain a worldly element ("land"), whereas "Nederlandsch" did.

As the Dutch increasingly referred to their own language as "Nederlandsch" or "Nederduytsch", the term "Duytsch" became more ambiguous. Dutch humanists, started to use "Duytsch" in a sense which would today be called "Germanic", for example in a dialogue recorded in the influential Dutch grammar book "Twe-spraack vande Nederduitsche letterkunst", published in 1584:

R. ghy zeyde flux dat de Duytsche taal by haar zelven bestaat/ ick heb my wel laten segghen,
dat onze spraack uyt het Hooghduytsch zou ghesproten zyn.
S: Ick spreeck, so als Becanus, int ghemeen vande duytse taal, die zelve voor een taal houdende.

— Excerpt from "Twe-spraack vande Nederduitsche letterkunst", by Hendrik Laurenszoon Spiegel (1584)
Translation:

R: You've just said that the Dutch language exists in its own right,
but I've heard it said that our language comes from High Dutch (i.e. German)
S: I, like Becanus, speak of the Germanic language in general, considering it as one.

In the Dutch language itself, Diets(c) (later Duyts) was used as one of several endonym and exonyms. As the Dutch increasingly referred to their own language as "Nederlandsch" or "Nederduytsch", the term "Duytsch" became more ambiguous. Dutch humanists, started to use "Duytsch" in a sense which would today be called "Germanic". Beginning in the second half of the 16th century, the nomenclature gradually became more fixed, with "Nederlandsch" and "Nederduytsch" becoming the preferred terms for Dutch and with "Hooghduytsch" referring to the language today called German. Initially the word "Duytsch" itself remained vague in exact meaning, but after the 1650s a trend emerges in which "Duytsch" is taken as the shorthand for "Hooghduytsch". This process was probably accelerated by the large number of Germans employed as agricultural day labourers and mercenary soldiers in the Dutch Republic and the ever increasing popularity of "Nederlandsch" and "Nederduytsch" over "Duytsch", the use of which had already been in decline for over a century, thereby acquiring its current meaning (German) in Dutch.

In the late 19th century "Nederduits" was reintroduced to Dutch through the German language, where prominent linguists, such as the Brothers Grimm and Georg Wenker, in the nascent field of German and Germanic studies used the term to refer to Germanic dialects which had not taken part in the High German consonant shift. Initially this group consisted of Dutch, English, Low German, and Frisian, but in modern scholarship only refers to Low German-varieties. Hence in contemporary Dutch, "Nederduits" is used to describe Low German varieties, specifically those spoken in Northern Germany as the varieties spoken in the eastern Netherlands, while related, are referred to as "Nedersaksisch".

== Names derived from low-lying land ==
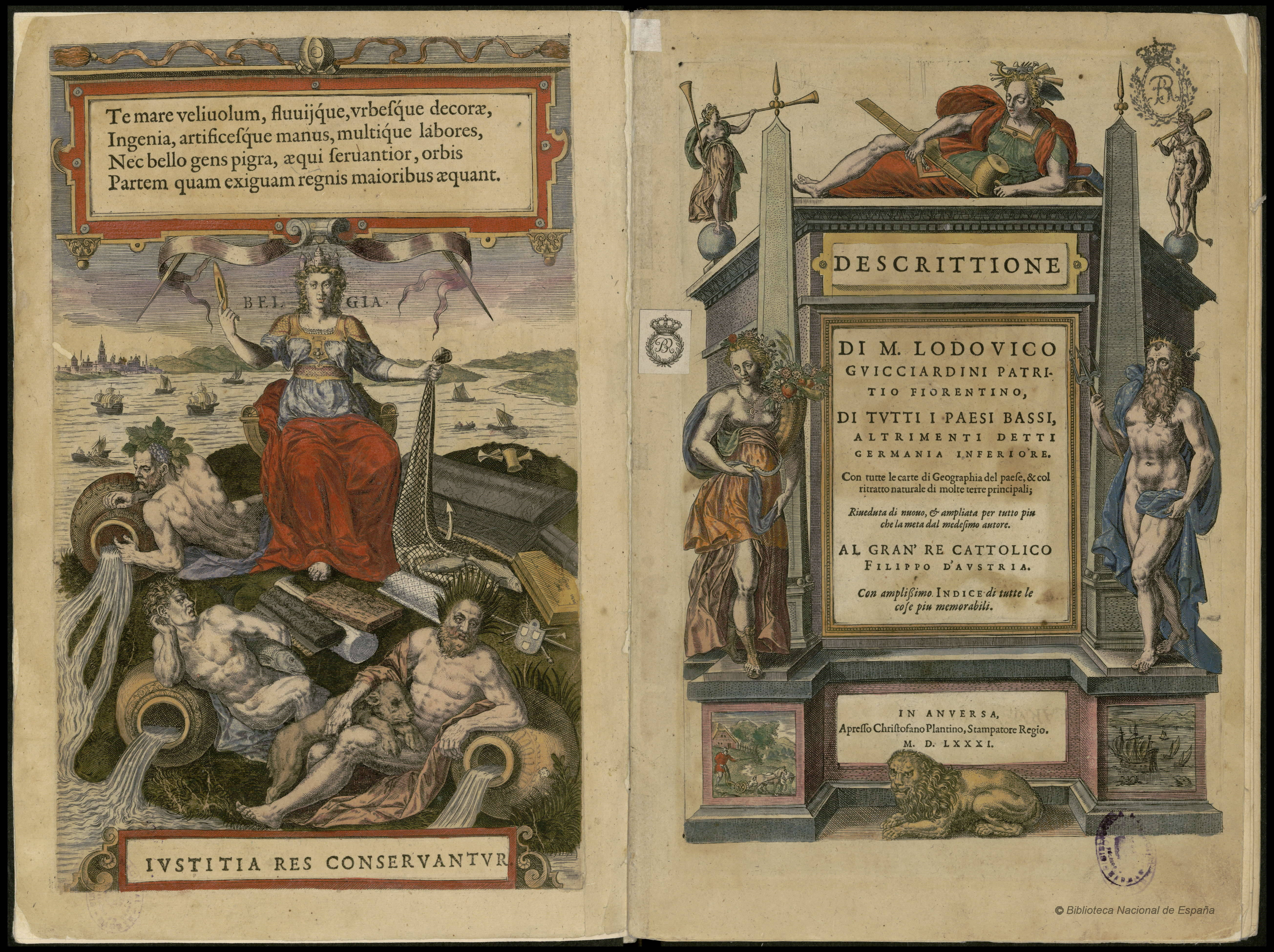
On the title page of Descrittione (1581), an account of the history and the arts of the Low Countries, no less than three names are used to indicate the Low Countries: # Belgia (alongside the woman figure on the left), # i Paesi Bassi # Germania inferiore (both to the right)

Place names with "low(er)" or neder, lage, nieder, nether, nedre, bas and inferior are used everywhere in Europe. They are often used in contrast with an upstream or higher area whose name contains words such as "upper", boven, oben, supérieure and haut. For example, Niderlant is mentioned in the 12th century legend Nibelungenlied, where it is located in the lower Rhine region around the German town Xanten. In this context the higher ground is around the Upper Rhine plain around the German city of Worms, where the events of the poem take place.

Both downstream at the Rhine–Meuse–Scheldt delta, and low at the mountainless European Plain at the North Sea apply to the Low Countries. The politically related geographical location of the "upper" ground changed over time tremendously, and rendered over time several names for the area now known as the Low Countries:

- Germania Inferior: Roman province established in AD 89 (parts of Belgium and the Netherlands), downstream from Germania Superior (southern Germany). In the 16th century the term was used again, though without this contrastive counterpart.
- Lower Lorraine: 10th century duchy (covered much of the Low Countries), downstream from Upper Lorraine (northern France)
- Les pays de par deçà: used by 15th century Burgundian rulers who resided in the Low Countries, meaning "the lands over here". On the other hand, Les pays de par delà or "the lands over there" was used for their original homeland Burgundy (central France).
- Pays d'embas: used by 16th century Habsburg ruler Mary of Hungary, meaning "land down here", used as opposed to her other possessions on higher grounds in Europe (Austria and Hungary). Possibly developed from "Les pays de par deçà".

=== Netherlands ===
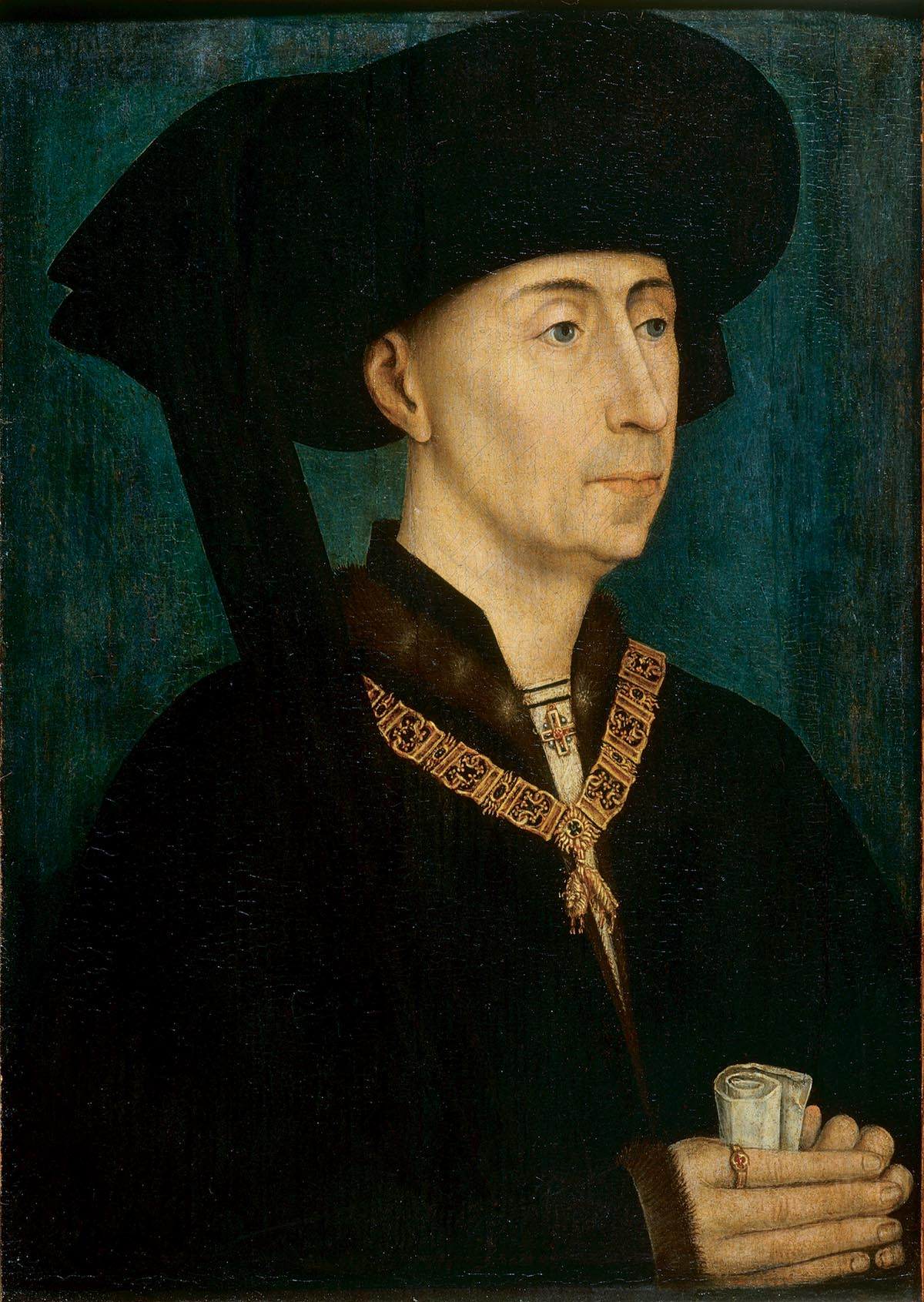
Under Philip the Good (1396–1467), Duke of Burgundy, the provinces of the Netherlands began to grow together: Flanders, Artois, Namur, Holland, Zeeland, Hainaut, Brabant, Limburg and Luxembourg were ruled in personal union. He has been honored by later humanists as the founding father of the Netherlands. (Portrait by Early Netherlandish painter Rogier van der Weyden, c. 1450).

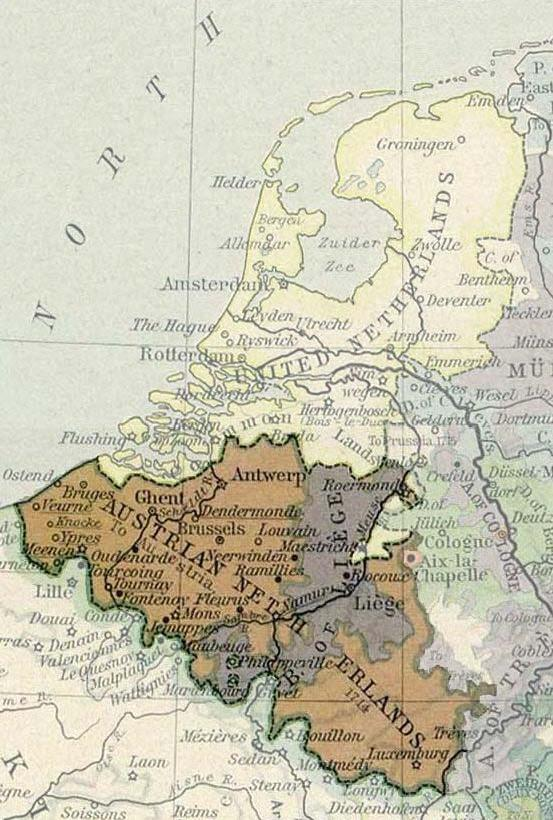
The Low Countries in 1786 with the Austrian Netherlands highlighted

Apart from its topographic usage for the then multi-government area of the Low Countries, the 15th century saw the first attested use of Nederlandsch as a term for the Dutch language, by extension hinting at a common ethnonym for people living in different fiefdoms. This was used alongside the long-standing Duytsch (the Early Modern spelling of the earlier Dietsc or Duutsc). The most common Dutch term for the Dutch language remained Nederduytsch or Nederduitsch until it was gradually superseded by Nederlandsch in the early 1900s, the latter becoming the sole name for the language by 1945. Earlier, from the mid-16th century on, the Eighty Years' War (1568–1648) had divided the Low Countries into the northern Dutch Republic and the southern Spanish Netherlands, introducing a distinction, i.e. Northern vs. Southern Netherlands; the first evolved into present-day the Netherlands, the latter into present-day Belgium, after a brief unification in the early 19th century. In the mean time the Dutch Republic was increasingly known as "Holland" informally, this even becoming official for a while during Napoleonic times (Kingdom of Holland).

The English adjective "Netherlandish", meaning "from the Low Countries", is derived directly from the Dutch adjective Nederlands (old spelling: Nederlandsch), and the French and German equivalents. It is rare in general use, but remains common in academic jargon, especially in reference to art or music produced anywhere in the Low Countries during the 15th and early 16th centuries. Since the second half of the 20th century, "Early Netherlandish painting", has replaced the term "Flemish Primitives", despite the equivalents remaining current in French, Dutch and other languages; the latter is now only seen in English text poorly-translated from those other languages. The reluctance to keep using "Flemish Primitives" comes from the pejorative connotation of the noun in common standard English.

In music the Franco-Flemish School is also known as the Netherlandish School. Later art and artists from the southern Catholic provinces of the Low Countries are usually called Flemish and those from the northern Protestant provinces Dutch, but art historians sometimes use "Netherlandish art" for art of the Low Countries produced before 1830, i.e., until the secession of Belgium from the Netherlands to distinguish the period from what came after. Apart from this largely intellectual use, the term "Netherlandish" as adjective is not commonly used in English, unlike its Dutch language equivalent.

Historic and contemporary toponyms include:

- Burgundian Netherlands: Low Countries provinces held by the House of Valois-Burgundy (1384–1482)
- Habsburg Netherlands: Low Countries provinces held by the House of Habsburg and later the Spanish Empire (1482–1581)
- Seven United Netherlands: Dutch Republic (1581–1795)
- Southern Netherlands: comprising present Belgium, Luxembourg and parts of northern France (1579–1794)
- Spanish Netherlands: comprising present Belgium, Luxembourg and parts of northern France (1579–1713)
- Austrian Netherlands: comprising present Belgium, Luxembourg and parts of northern France under Habsburg rule (after 1713)
- Sovereign Principality of the United Netherlands: short-lived precursor of the United Kingdom of the Netherlands (1813–1815)
- United Kingdom of the Netherlands: unification of the Northern Netherlands and the Southern Netherlands (Belgium and Luxembourg) (1815–1830)
- Kingdom of the Netherlands: sovereign state, kingdom with the Netherlands, Aruba, Curaçao, and Sint Maarten as constituent countries
- Netherlands: European part (constituent country) of the kingdom of the Netherlands
- New Netherland: Former Dutch colony established in 1625 centred on New Amsterdam (the modern New York City)
- Caribbean Netherlands: Netherlands' Caribbean municipalities
- Neerlandia: Canadian hamlet founded by Dutch immigrants

Many languages have a cognate or calque derived from the Dutch adjective Nederlands:

- Afrikaans: Nederlands
- Basque: Neerlandera
- Bulgarian: Нидерландски (Niderlandski)
- Catalan/Valencian: neerlandès
- Danish: nederlandsk
- English: Netherlandic, Netherlandish
  (neither in general use)
- Esperanto: nederlanda
- French: néerlandais
- Galician: neerlandés
- German: Niederländisch
- Interlingua: nederlandese
- Italian: ne(d)erlandese
- Korean: 네덜란드 (Nedeollandeu)
- Latin: nederlandiensis
- Latvian: nīderlandiešu valoda
- Low Saxon: Nederlannsch
- Norwegian: Nederlandsk
- Polish: niderlandzki
- Portuguese: neerlandês
- Romanian: neerlandeză
- Russian: Нидерландский (Niderlandskij)
- Sinhala: නෙදර්ලන්තය (Nedarlanthaya)
- Spanish: neerlandés
- Swedish: nederländska
- Ukrainian: нідерландська (niderlandska)
- Welsh: iseldireg
- West Frisian: Nederlânsk

=== Neerland- ===
The Dutch equivalent 'Nederland' knows a less common variation without the 'd', which only occurs conjugated, with a suffix. It is used to add an archaic, patriotic, exalted, poetic or academic meaning.

- Neerlands: Occurs only as a possessive noun (with a genitive -s), followed by what is possessed: Neerlands hoop, Neerlands glorie, Neerlands trots, Neerlands helden (Dutch hope, glory, pride, heros); Wien Neêrlands bloed: former anthem of the Netherlands
- Neerlandistiek: the study of the Dutch language (Dutch studies) and a magazine relating to Dutch language and literature
- Neerlandicus: practitioner of Neerlandistiek (m)
- Neerlandica: practitioner of Neerlandistiek (v), name for several plant subspecies from the Netherlands, name of several publications relating to or founded in the Netherlands (Statistica Neerlandica, Neerlandica Wratislaviensia, Flora Neerlandica), name for the establishment of Dutch colonial authority in the Dutch Indies (Pax Neerlandica)
- Neerlandisme: Dutch expressions in another language, or expressions common in the Netherlands, but not in Dutch-speaking Belgium
- Neerlandia: name of or relating to Dutch publishing, places, vehicles (including ships), brands and organisations
- Grootneerlandisme: irredentist political movement that aims to unite Flanders and the Netherlands in one Dutch-speaking state

=== Low Countries ===
The Low Countries (Dutch: Lage Landen) refers to the historical region de Nederlanden: those principalities located on and near the mostly low-lying land around the Rhine–Meuse–Scheldt delta. That region corresponds to all of the Netherlands, Belgium and Luxembourg, forming the Benelux. The name "Benelux" is formed from joining the first two or three letters of each country's name Belgium, Netherlands and Luxembourg. It was first used to name the customs agreement that initiated the union (signed in 1944) and is now used more generally to refer to the geopolitical and economical grouping of the three countries, while "Low Countries" is used in a more cultural or historical context.

In many languages the nomenclature "Low Countries" can both refer to the cultural and historical region comprising present-day Belgium, the Netherlands and Luxembourg, and to "the Netherlands" alone, e.g., Les Pays-Bas in French, Los Países Bajos in Spanish and i Paesi Bassi in Italian. Several other languages have literally translated "Low Countries" into their own language to refer to the Dutch language:

- Croatian: Nizozemski
- Czech: Nizozemština
- Irish: Ísiltíris
- Southern Min: 低地語/低地语 (Kē-tē-gú)
- Serbian: низоземски (nizozemski)
- Slovene: nizozemščina
- Welsh: Iseldireg

== Names derived from local polities ==
=== Flanders ===
The name of the historic County of Flanders had been a pars pro toto for the Low Countries until the 17th century.

Flemish (Dutch: Vlaams) is derived from the name of the County of Flanders (Dutch: Graafschap Vlaanderen), in the early Middle Ages the most influential county in the Low Countries, and the economic powerhouse of Northern Europe. It became in the 14th century the residence of the Burgundian dukes, establishing further its cultural dominance. Due to its cultural importance, "Flemish" became in certain languages a pars pro toto for the Low Countries and the Dutch language. This was certainly the case in France, since the Flemish are the first Dutch speaking people for them to encounter. In French-Dutch dictionaries of the 16th century, "Dutch" is almost always translated as Flameng.

Fleming is also the name used for immigrants from the Low Countries, most of them from Flanders, who came to Scotland over a 600 year period, between the eleventh and seventeenth centuries. The name is still a common Scottish surnames and Clan Fleming is also an officially recognised clan by the Lord Lyon King of Arms. The Flemish came to Scotland in several waves. The earliest Flemish settlers in Britain came with William the Conqueror in 1066 with the Norman Conquest. The Flemish were closely allied with the Normans, because William’s wife was the daughter of a Count of Flanders.

A calque of Vlaams as a reference to the language and the region of the Low Countries was also in use in Spain. In the 16th century, when Spain inherited the Habsburg Netherlands, the whole area of the Low Countries was indicated as Flandes, and the inhabitants of Flandes were called Flamencos. For example, the Eighty Years' War between the rebellious Dutch Republic and the Spanish Empire was called Las guerras de Flandes and the Spanish army that was based in the Low Countries was named the Army of Flanders (Spanish: Ejército de Flandes).

The name Vlaanderen is formed from a stem flām-, meaning "flooded area" (cf. Norwegian flaum ‘flood’, English dialectal fleam ‘millstream; trench or gully in a meadow that drains it’), with a suffix -ðr- attached. The Old Dutch form is flāmisk, which becomes vlamesc, vlaemsch in Middle Dutch and Vlaams in Modern Dutch. Flemish is now exclusively used to describe the majority of Dutch dialects found in Flanders, and a reference to the region where they are spoken, corresponding with the Dutch language region of Belgium. This use is also a pars pro toto, since the region includes not only the historic county of Flanders where the Dutch dialect (West) Flemish is spoken, but also Limburg and the historic region of Brabant, where respectively the Dutch dialects Limburgish and Brabantian are spoken. Calques of Vlaams in other languages, in most cases referencing to this region, its people and the language:

- Basque: flandriera
- Catalan: flamenc
- Czech: vlámština
- Danish: flamsk
- Esperanto: flandra
- Estonian: flaami keel
- Finnish: flaami
- French: flamand
- Galician: flamengo
- German: flämisch
- Greek: φλαμανδικά (flamandika)
- Modern Hebrew: פלמית (Flémit)
- Hungarian: flamand
- Icelandic: flæmska
- Interlingua: flamingo
- Irish: pléimeainnis
- Italian: fiammingo
- Latvian: flāmu valoda
- Maltese: Fjamming
- Polish: flamandzki
- Portuguese: flamengo
- Romanian: flamandă
- Russian: фламандский (flamandskij)
- Serbian: фламански (flamanski)
- Slovene: flamščina
- Spanish: flamenco
- Swedish: flamländska
- Turkish: Flamanca
- Ukrainian: фламандська (flamandska)

=== Holland ===
The name of the historic County of Holland is sometimes incorrectly used as a pars pro toto for the Netherlands.

In many languages including English, (a calque of) "Holland" is a common pars pro toto for the Netherlands as a whole. Correctly speaking, Holland is only the central-western region of the country comprising two of the twelve provinces: North Holland and South Holland. Holland has, particularly for outsiders, long become a pars pro toto name for the whole nation, similar to the use of Russia for the (former) Soviet Union, or England for the United Kingdom.

The practice of referring to the entire country as "Holland" is controversial within the Netherlands. Many Dutch people, particularly those from outside Holland, object to this usage as inaccurate or misrepresentative, drawing parallels to Welsh or Scottish objections when the UK is referred to as England.

From the 17th century onwards, the County of Holland was the most powerful region in the current Netherlands. The counts of Holland were also counts of Hainaut, Friesland and Zeeland from the 13th to the 15th centuries. Holland remained most powerful during the period of the Dutch Republic, dominating foreign trade, and hence most of the Dutch traders encountered by foreigners were from Holland, which explains why the Netherlands is often called Holland overseas.

After the demise of the Dutch Republic under Napoleon, that country became known as the Kingdom of Holland (1806–1810). This is the only time in history that "Holland" became an official designation of the entire Dutch territory. Around the same time, the former countship of Holland was dissolved and split up into two provinces, later known as North Holland and South Holland, because one Holland province by itself was considered too dominant in area, population and wealth compared to the other provinces. Today the two provinces making up Holland, including the cities of Amsterdam, The Hague, and Rotterdam, remain politically, economically and demographically dominant – 37% of the Dutch population live there. In most other Dutch provinces, particularly in the south including Flanders (Belgium), the word Hollander is commonly used in either colloquial or pejorative sense to refer to the perceived superiority or supposed arrogance of people from the Randstad – the main conurbation of Holland proper and of the Netherlands.

In 2019, the Dutch government announced that it would only communicate and advertise under its real name "the Netherlands" in the future, and stop describing itself as Holland. They stated: “It has been agreed that the Netherlands, the official name of our country, should preferably be used.” From 2019 onwards, the nation's football team will solely be called the Netherlands in any official setting. Nonetheless, the name "Holland" is still widely used for the Netherlands national football team.

The use may be discouraged by companies as well. For example, the "Holland" entry in the style guide of The Guardian and The Observer newspapers states: "Do not use when you mean the Netherlands (of which it is a region), with the exception of the Dutch football team, which is conventionally known as Holland".

In 2009, members of the First Chamber drew attention to the fact that in Dutch passports, for some EU-languages a translation meaning "Kingdom of Holland" was used, as opposed to "Kingdom of the Netherlands". As replacements for the Estonian Hollandi Kuningriik, Hungarian Holland Királyság, Romanian Regatul Olandei and Slovak Holandské kráľovstvo, the parliamentarians proposed Madalmaade Kuningriik, Németalföldi Királyság, Regatul Țărilor de Jos and Nizozemské Kráľovstvo, respectively. Their reasoning was that "if in addition to Holland a recognisable translation of the Netherlands does exist in a foreign language, it should be regarded as the best translation" and that "the Kingdom of the Netherlands has a right to use the translation it thinks best, certainly on official documents". Although the government initially refused to change the text except for the Estonian, recent Dutch passports feature the translation proposed by the First Chamber members. Calques derived from Holland to refer to the Dutch language in other languages:

- Arabic: هولندي (hōlandī)
- Bengali: ওলন্দাজ (olondaj)
- Bulgarian: холандски (holandski)
- Catalan/Valencian: holandès
- Chinese: 荷蘭語/荷兰语 (hélányŭ)
- Czech: holandština
- Danish: hollandsk
- Estonian: hollandi keel
- Finnish: hollanti
- French: hollandais
- Galician: holandés
- Georgian: ჰოლანდიური (holandiuri)
- German: Holländisch
- Greek: Ολλανδικά (Ollandika)
- Gujarati: હોલેન્ડ (Holand)
- Hebrew: הולנדית (Holandit)
- Hindi: होलेन्ड (Holand)
- Hungarian: holland
- Icelandic: hollenska
- Interlingua: hollandese
- Irish: Ollainnis
- Italian: olandese
- Japanese: オランダ語 (Orandago)
- Latin: Hollandica
- Latvian: holandiešu valoda
- Lithuanian: Olandų kalba
- Macedonian: холандски (hólandski)
- Malay (including Malaysian and Indonesian): Belanda
- Maltese: Olandiż
- Persian: هلندی (holandī)
- Polish: holenderski
- Portuguese: holandês
- Romanian: olandeză
- Russian: Голландский (Gollandskij)
- Serbian: холандски (holandski)
- Sinhala: ඕලන්දය (Olandaya)
- Slovak: holandčina
- Spanish: holandés
- Swedish: holländska
- Tagalog: Olandés
- Turkish: hollandaca
- Ukrainian: голландська (hollandska)
- Vietnamese: tiếng Hà Lan

Toponyms:

- County of Holland: former county in the Netherlands, dissolved in the provinces North and South Holland
- South Holland (Zuid-Holland): province in the Netherlands
- North Holland (Noord-Holland): province in the Netherlands
- Holland: region, former county in the Netherlands consisting of the provinces Noord- en Zuid-Holland
- Kingdom of Holland: puppet state set up by Napoleon who took the name of the leading province for the whole country (1806–1810)
- New Holland (Nova Hollandia): historical name for mainland Australia (1644–1824)
- New Holland: Dutch colony in Brazil (1630–1654)
- New Holland: Dutch colony in northeastern North America
- Hollandia (city): the capital of a district of the same name in West New Guinea (1910–1949), now Jayapura

=== Brabant ===
Duchy of Brabant located in the heart of the old Lower Lorraine

Belgian patriots chose the colours of Brabant (red, yellow and black) for their cockade. This would later influence the Belgian flag created in 1830.

As the Low Country's prime duchy, with the only and oldest scientific centre (the University of Leuven), Brabant has served as a pars pro toto for the whole of the Low Countries, for example in the writings of Desiderius Erasmus in the early 16th century.

Perhaps of influence for this pars pro toto usage is the Brabantian holding of the ducal title of Lower Lorraine. In 1190, after the death of Godfrey III, Henry I became Duke of Lower Lorraine, where the Low Countries have their political origin. By that time the title had lost most of its territorial authority. According to protocol, all his successors were thereafter called Dukes of Brabant and Lower Lorraine (often called Duke of Lothier).

Brabant symbolism served again a role as national symbols during the formation of Belgium. The national anthem of Belgium is called the Brabançonne ('the Brabantian'), and the Belgium flag has taken its colours from the Brabant coat of arms: black, yellow and red. This was influenced by the Brabant Revolution (French: Révolution brabançonne, Dutch: Brabantse Omwenteling), sometimes referred to as the "Belgian Revolution of 1789–90" in older writing, that was an armed insurrection that occurred in the Austrian Netherlands (modern-day Belgium) between October 1789 and December 1790. The revolution led to the brief overthrow of Habsburg rule and the proclamation of a short-lived polity, the United Belgian States. Some historians have seen it as a key moment in the formation of a Belgian nation-state, and an influence on the Belgian Revolution of 1830.

=== Seventeen and Seven Provinces ===
Holland, Flanders and 15 other counties, duchies and bishoprics in the Low Countries were united as the Seventeen Provinces in a personal union during the 16th century, covered by the Pragmatic Sanction of 1549 of Holy Roman Emperor Charles V, which freed the provinces from their archaic feudal obligations.

In 1566, Philip II of Spain, heir of Charles V, sent an army of Spanish mercenaries to suppress political upheavals to the Seventeen Provinces. A number of southern provinces (Hainaut, Artois, Walloon Flanders, Namur, Luxembourg and Limburg) united in the Union of Arras (1579), and begun negotiations for a peace treaty with Spain. In response, nine northern provinces united in the Union of Utrecht (1579) against Spain. After the Flanders and the Brabant where reconquered by Spain, the remaining seven provinces (Frisia, Gelre, Holland, Overijssel, Groningen, Utrecht and Zeeland) signed 2 years later the declaration of independence of the Seven United Provinces. Since then, several ships of the Royal Netherlands Navy have bared that name.

== Names derived from (Gallic-)Germanic tribes ==
=== Belgae ===
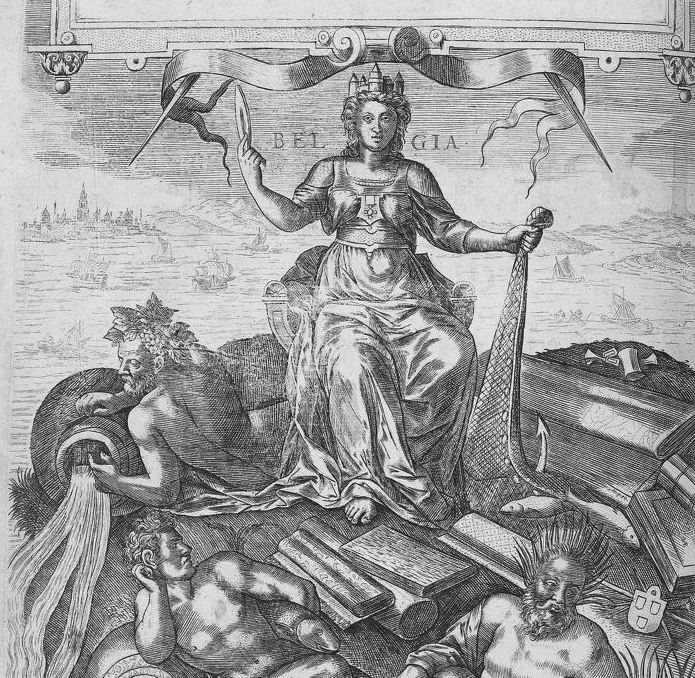
Belgia, the national personification of the Low Countries in the 17th century.

The nomenclature Belgica is harking back to the ancient local tribe of the Belgae and the Roman province named after that tribe Gallia Belgica. Although a derivation of that name is now reserved for the Kingdom of Belgium, from the 15th to the 17th century the name was the usual Latin translation to refer to the entire Low Countries. This was from the start of the Dutch Revolt against Spain on maps heroically visualised as the Leo Belgicus or personified as the maiden Belgica or Belgia. From the second half of the 16th century lingua Belgica or Belgicus became under the influence of Humanism also the Latinised name for the Dutch language in dictionaries.

- Belgica Foederata: literally "United Belgium", Latinised name for the Northern Netherlands, (Dutch Republic), after it declared independence from the Spanish Empire
- Belgica Regia: literally "King's Belgium", Latinised name for the Southern Netherlands, remained faithful to the Spanish king
- Nova Belgica: Latined name for the former Dutch colony New Netherland, with New Amsterdam (now New York City) as its centre.
- Fort Belgica: fort built by the Dutch in the Indonesian Banda Islands in the 17th century.
- United Belgian States: also known as "United Netherlandish States" (Dutch: Verenigde Nederlandse Staten) or "United States of Belgium", short-lived Belgian precursor state established after the Brabant Revolution against the Habsburg (1790)

=== Batavi ===
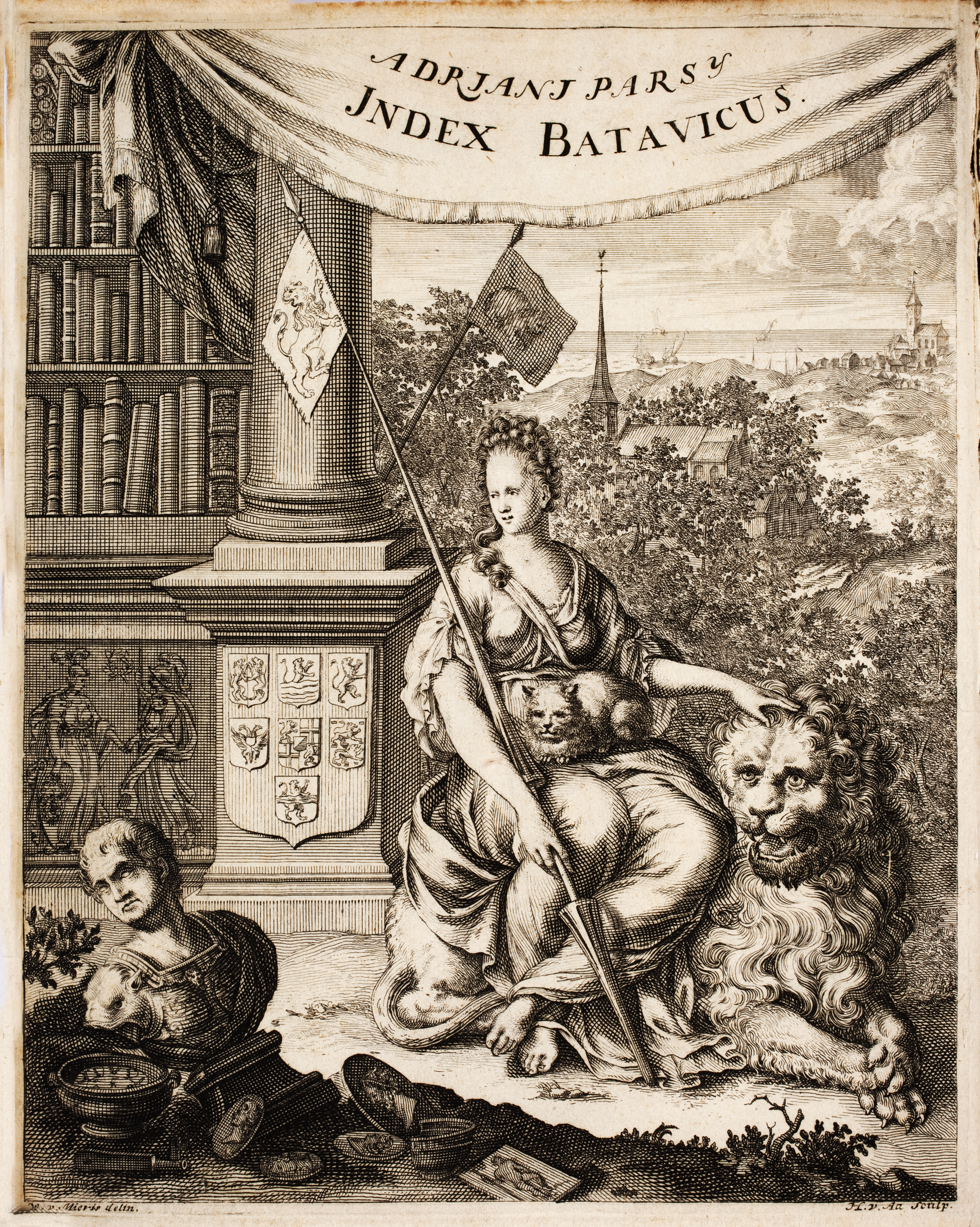
The Latin title Index Batavicus is translated in the subtitle (not shown) as Naamrol van de Batavise en Hollandse schrijvers ("Index of Batavian and Dutch writers"). The Dutch Virgin sits on the Dutch lion. Left in the background a bookcase bearing the coats of arms of the Dutch Republic (1701).

Throughout the centuries the Dutch attempted to define their collective identity by looking at their ancestors, the Batavi. As claimed by the Roman historian Tacitus, the Batavi were a brave Germanic tribe living in the Netherlands, probably in the Betuwe region. In Dutch, the adjective Bataafs ("Batavian") was used from the 15th to the 18th century, meaning "of, or relating to the Netherlands" (but not the southern Netherlands).

Other use:

- Lingua Batava or Batavicus: in use as Latin names for the Dutch language
- Batavisme: in French an expression copied from the Dutch language
- Batave: in French a person from the Netherlands
- Batavian Legion: a unit of Dutch volunteers under French command, created and dissolved in 1793
- Batavian Revolution: political, social and cultural turmoil in the Netherlands (end 18th century)
- Batavian Republic (Dutch: Bataafse Republiek; French: République Batave), Dutch client state of France (1795–1806)
- Batavia, Dutch East Indies: capital city of the Dutch East Indies, corresponds to the present-day city of Jakarta

== Names derived from confederations of Germanic tribes ==
=== Franconian ===
Frankish was the West Germanic language spoken by the Franks, a confederation of Germanic tribes that erose in the Migration Period. Between the 5th and 9th centuries, the languages spoken by the Salian Franks in Belgium and the Netherlands evolved into Old Low Franconian (Dutch: Oudnederfrankisch), which formed the beginning of a separate Dutch language and is synonymous with Old Dutch. Compare the synonymous usage, in a linguistic context, of Old English versus Anglo-Saxon.

=== Frisian ===
Frisii were an ancient tribe who lived in the coastal area of the Netherlands in Roman times. After the Migration Period the confederation of Anglo-Saxons, coming from the east, settled the region. Franks in the south, who were familiar with Roman texts, called the coastal region Frisia, and hence its inhabitants Frisians, even though not all of the inhabitants had Frisian ancestry. After a Frisian Kingdom emerged in the mid-7th century in the Netherlands, with its centre of power the city of Utrecht, the Franks conquered the Frisians and converted them to Christianity. From that time on a colony of Frisians was living in Rome and thus the old name for the people from the Low Countries who came to Rome has remained in use in the national church of the Netherlands in Rome, which is called the Frisian church (Dutch: Friezenkerk; Italian: chiesa nazionale dei Frisoni). In 1989, this church was granted to the Dutch community in Rome.

== See also ==
- Name of the Franks
- Belgium (disambiguation)
- Netherlands (disambiguation)
- List of place names of Dutch origin
