= Hyvästi, Dolores Haze =

Studio album by Johanna Kurkela
- Released: April 7, 2010
- Recorded: 2009–2010
- Genre: Pop, acoustic
- Label: Warner Music
- Producer: Sampo Haapaniemi; Markus Koskinen

Johanna Kurkela chronology
Kauriinsilmät (2008)	Hyvästi, Dolores Haze (2010)

Hyvästi, Dolores Haze, released in 2010, is Johanna Kurkela's fourth studio album.

The first single from the album was Rakkauslaulu, which was written by Lauri Ylönen and Paula Vesala. The song contains cello played by Apocalyptica cellist, Eicca Toppinen. The album is produced by Sampo Haapaniemi and Markus Koskinen.

Hyvästi, Dolores Haze debuted at number one on the Finnish albums chart.

== Track listing ==
1. "Tuo se mulle" – 03:28 (music by Timo Kiiskinen and Markus Koskinen, lyrics by Kiiskinen and Markus Timo Koskinen)
2. "Kielletyt kielot" – 04:35 (music and lyrics by Tuure Kilpeläinen)
3. "Rakkauslaulu" – 04:12 (music by Lauri Ylönen, lyrics by Paula Vesala)
4. "Ainutlaatuinen" – 03:53 (music by Teemu Brunila, lyrics by Markus Koskinen)
5. "Ilta saapuikin niin äkkiä" – 04:14 (music and lyrics by Markus Koskinen)
6. "Kosketusta vailla vapiseva mies" – 04:16 (music and lyrics by Tuure Kilpeläinen)
7. "Piha ilman sua" – 04:05 (music by Juha Tapio, lyrics by Kuvaja Eve)
8. "Maan päällä niin kuin taivaassa" – 03:52 (music by Pepe Johansson, lyrics by Markus Koskinen)
9. "Satojen merien näkijä" – 03:52 (music and lyrics by Tuomas Holopainen)
10. "Jos sä tarvitset mua" – 03:51 (music and lyrics by Marko Saaresto)
11. "Hyvästi, Dolores Haze" – 03:39 (music and lyrics by Eppu Kosonen)
