= One for Sorrow (album) =

Studio album by Insomnium
- Released: (Finland) October 12, 2011 (European Union) October 17, 2011 (United States) October 18, 2011
- Recorded: March – May 2011
- Studios: Gothenburg Rock Studios; Fantom Studio; NoiseWorks Studio
- Genre: Melodic death metal
- Length: 53:07
- Label: Century Media
- Producer: Samu Oittinen

Insomnium chronology
Across the Dark (2009)	One for Sorrow (2011)	Shadows of the Dying Sun (2014)

One for Sorrow is the fifth studio album by Finnish melodic death metal band Insomnium. It was released on October 12, 2011 in Finland, October 17, 2011 throughout the rest of Europe, and October 18, 2011 in the USA, on Century Media Records. It is the band's first release on the Century Media label.

Music videos were released for the tracks "One for Sorrow", "Through the Shadows", "Only One Who Waits", "Regain the Fire", and for the limited edition bonus track "Weather The Storm".

== Track listing ==
No.	Title	Lyrics	Music	Length
1.	"Inertia"	Ville Friman	Friman	3:43
2.	"Through the Shadows"	Friman	Friman	4:31
3.	"Song of the Blackest Bird"	Sevänen	Friman; Niilo Sevänen; Ville Vänni	7:29
4.	"Only One Who Waits"	Sevänen	Friman	5:17
5.	"Unsung"	Sevänen	Friman; Sevänen	5:04
6.	"Every Hour Wounds"	Friman	Friman	5:25
7.	"Decoherence"	Instrumental	Friman	3:18
8.	"Lay the Ghost to Rest"	Friman	Friman	7:46
9.	"Regain the Fire"	Friman	Friman	4:27
10.	"One for Sorrow"	Friman	Friman	6:07
Total length:				53:07

Limited edition bonus track
No.	Title	Lyrics	Music	Length
11.	"Weather the Storm" (featuring Mikael Stanne of Dark Tranquillity)	Friman	Friman	4:53

Japanese edition bonus tracks
No.	Title	Writer(s)	Length
11.	"Weather the Storm" (featuring Mikael Stanne of Dark Tranquillity)	Friman	4:53
12.	"Beyond the Horizon"	Friman	5:11

Professional ratings
Review scores
Source	Rating
The Metal Critic	8.1/10
Thisisnotascene	9/10 stars
Thrash Hits	3/6
Sputnikmusic	4.0
SonicEscapes	A+
Ultimate-Guitar	8.8

== Personnel ==
- Niilo Sevänen – bass, lead vocals
- Ville Friman – rhythm guitar, clean vocals
- Ville Vänni – lead guitar
- Markus Hirvonen – drums
