= Above the Weeping World =

Studio album by Insomnium
- Released: August 9, 2006
- Recorded: April 7 – May 14, 2006
- Studio: Fantom Studio
- Genre: Melodic death metal
- Length: 52:56
- Label: Candlelight
- Producer: Samu Oittinen

Insomnium chronology
Since the Day it All Came Down (2004)	Above the Weeping World (2006)	Across the Dark (2009)

Professional ratings
Review scores
Source	Rating
About.com	4/5 stars
Allmusic	3.5/5 stars
CoC	9.5/10 stars
Kerrang!	5/5 stars
Metal Hammer	8/10 stars
Sea of Tranquility	4.5/5 stars
Sputnikmusic	4.5/5 stars
Ultimate Guitar	9.4/10

Above the Weeping World is the third studio album by Finnish melodic death metal band Insomnium. It was released on August 9, 2006, in Europe and on October 17, 2006, elsewhere by Candlelight Records. A music video was made for "Mortal Share."

During its first week, the album peaked at #9 on the Finnish album charts (week 39/2006).

The album's lyrics have been influenced by (and occasionally taken from) classic poets like Hölderlin, Edgar Allan Poe, and Finnish classic Eino Leino. The last track of the album, "In the Groves of Death" lasts about ten minutes, and its main theme is heavily inspired by Leino's poem Tumma, the ending poem of his saga Helkavirsiä. The entire poem "The Night Has a Thousand Eyes" by English poet Francis William Bourdillon is used as a chorus in the album's third track "Drawn to Black". Above the Weeping World has received extraordinary reviews both in Finland (e.g. SUE magazine 10/10)) and abroad (e.g. Kerrang! 5/5), and the album debuted on the Finnish album charts at the 9th position (week 39/2006), which is a remarkable achievement for a melodic death metal band. At the same time, Insomnium embarked on their first full European tour, playing 36 gigs in six weeks (5.9–15.10), in 15 countries.

== Track listing ==
No.	Title	Lyrics	Music	Length
1.	"The Gale"	Ville Friman	Friman	2:41
2.	"Mortal Share"	Niilo Sevänen	Friman	4:00
3.	"Drawn to Black"	Sevänen; Francis William Bourdillon	Friman; Sevänen; Ville Vänni	6:00
4.	"Change of Heart"	Friman	Friman; Sevänen	4:31
5.	"At the Gates of Sleep"	Sevänen	Sevänen	7:05
6.	"The Killjoy"	Sevänen	Friman	5:23
7.	"Last Statement"	Sevänen	Sevänen	7:32
8.	"Devoid of Caring"	Vänni	Friman	5:40
9.	"In the Groves of Death"	Sevänen	Friman; Sevänen; Vänni	10:08
Total length:				53:00

Japanese edition bonus tracks
No.	Title	Length
10.	"Vicious Circle Complete" (demo) (taken from Demo '99)	5:12
11.	"Unmourned" (demo) (taken from Demo '99)	4:49
12.	"Numen Divinum" (demo) (taken from Demo '99)	5:30

== Personnel ==
Insomnium

- Niilo Sevänen − vocals, bass
- Ville Friman − guitars
- Ville Vänni − guitars
- Markus Hirvonen − drums

Additional Musicians

- Keyboard arrangements by Aleksi Munter; keyboard parts composed by Aleksi Munter, Ville Friman & Niilo Sevänen
- Antti Haapanen: additional vocals on tracks 6 & 9

Production

- Arranged and produced by Insomnium
- Engineered & mixed By Samu Oittinen (between April 7 – May 14, 2006)
- Mastered by Minerva Pappi (June 5, 2006 at Finnvox Studios)

Other

- Band photos by Ville Kaisla and Jussi Särkilahti
- Art direction by Ville Kaisla and assisted by Olli-Pekka Saloniemi

== Release history ==
Country	Release date
Europe	August 9, 2006
Worldwide	October 17, 2006
