= Auri (band) =

Finnish progressive folk band

- Genres: Progressive folk
- Years active: 2017–present
- Label: Nuclear Blast
- Members: Johanna Kurkela; Tuomas Holopainen; Troy Donockley

Auri is a Finnish progressive folk band composed of vocalist and violinist Johanna Kurkela, keyboardist Tuomas Holopainen (her husband), and guitarist and pipe player Troy Donockley. Holopainen and Donockley are also members of the band Nightwish. Their self-titled first album, Auri, was released on March 23, 2018 and was recorded at Peter Gabriel's Real World Studios.

Holopainen described Auri's style as "rabbit hole music and celestial metal" with "influences from folk music, Celtic music, [and] soundtracks". British rock magazine Prog describes the band as prog folk. The band's name is based on a female character from The Kingkiller Chronicle.

== History ==
Auri was formed by friends Tuomas Holopainen, Troy Donockley and Johanna Kurkela. According to an interview, the music concept for Auri dates back to 2011 when the trio realized they would have to do music together. However, their ongoing responsibilities with other projects prevented them from doing so, until 2017 when they finally had available free time to work on this project. The promotional photoshoot for the band and album inspired and forced them to complete the recording:

“2011 was when the seed was planted, so to say. That's when Troy made the first song called Aphrodite Rising, and already back then, we knew that at some point that the three of us, we needed to be doing music together because the way we think about music and life, everything, it's so connected. It's such a rare thing that we need to come together and see what kind of music we would be able to create between the three of us. But for many years, we had other duties to attend to, with Johanna's solo career, us and with Nightwish being really busy with the Endless Forms Most Beautiful album and tour, that we didn't have a chance to realize this dream called Auri until 2017. At some point in 2016, we realized, What are you doing next year? Do you have anything on your calendar? Not really, nothing. So, how about we try to do something? It went a bit topsy-turvy because the first thing we did last March was to take the promotional shots, the photos of the band and of the landscapes for the album booklet. That kind of inspired and even forced us to continue recording the actual album.”

— Tuomas Holopainen

The band's name is based on a female character from Patrick Rothfuss' The Kingkiller Chronicle:

“But what I can tell you is that some of the content and the song lyrics are inspired by the Patrick Rothfuss books. Maybe people who know those books and those stories will recognize some parallels and certain scenarios, but believe me; the album equates to so much more.”

— Tuomas Holopainen

On 17 October 2020, it was announced that Auri had completed work on the second album. The second album, titled II – Those We Don't Speak Of was later released on 3 September 2021.

Auri went on their first tour in Finland in August 2025, and later expanded out the tour throughout Europe in September and October.

== Band members ==
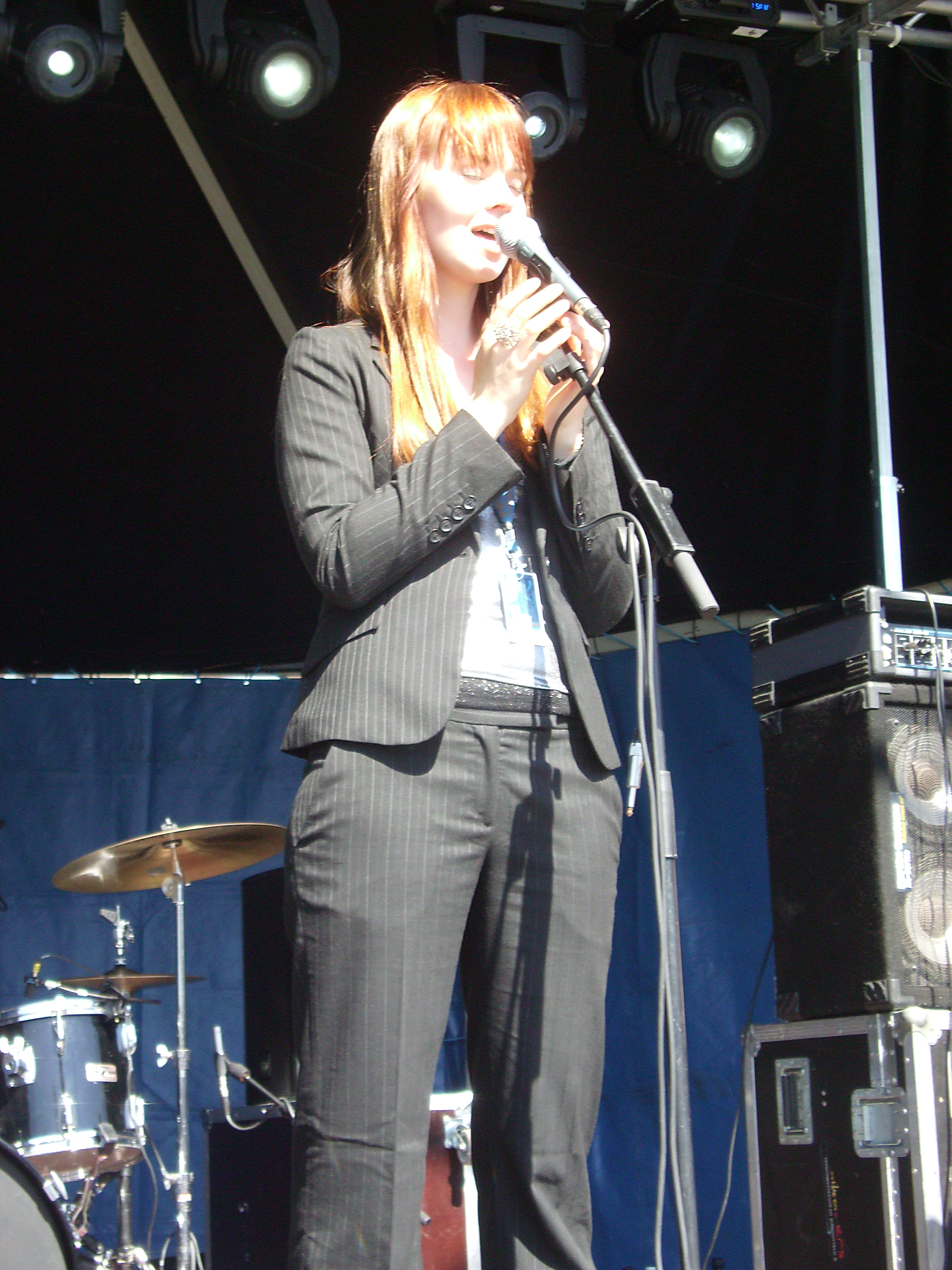
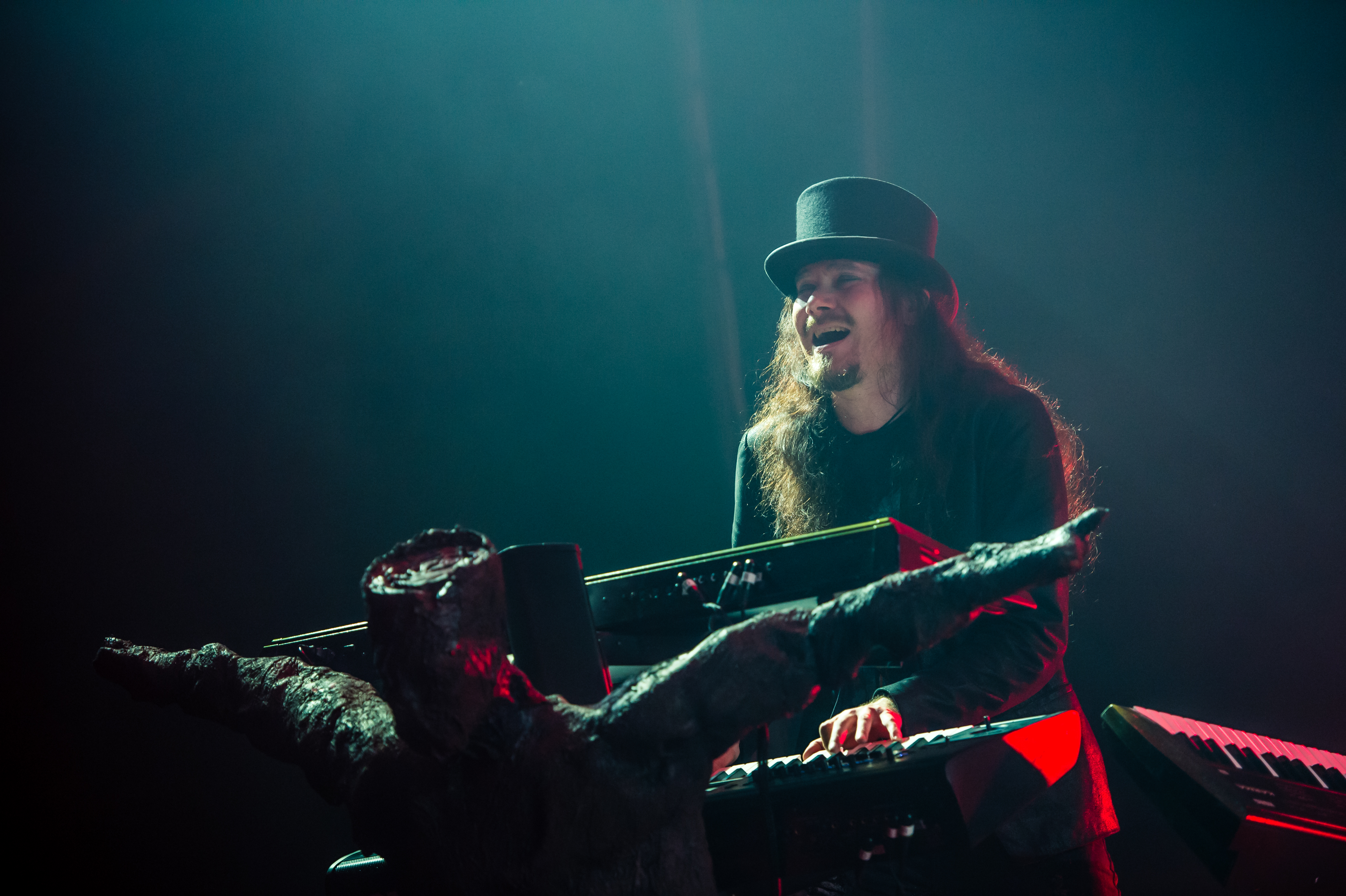
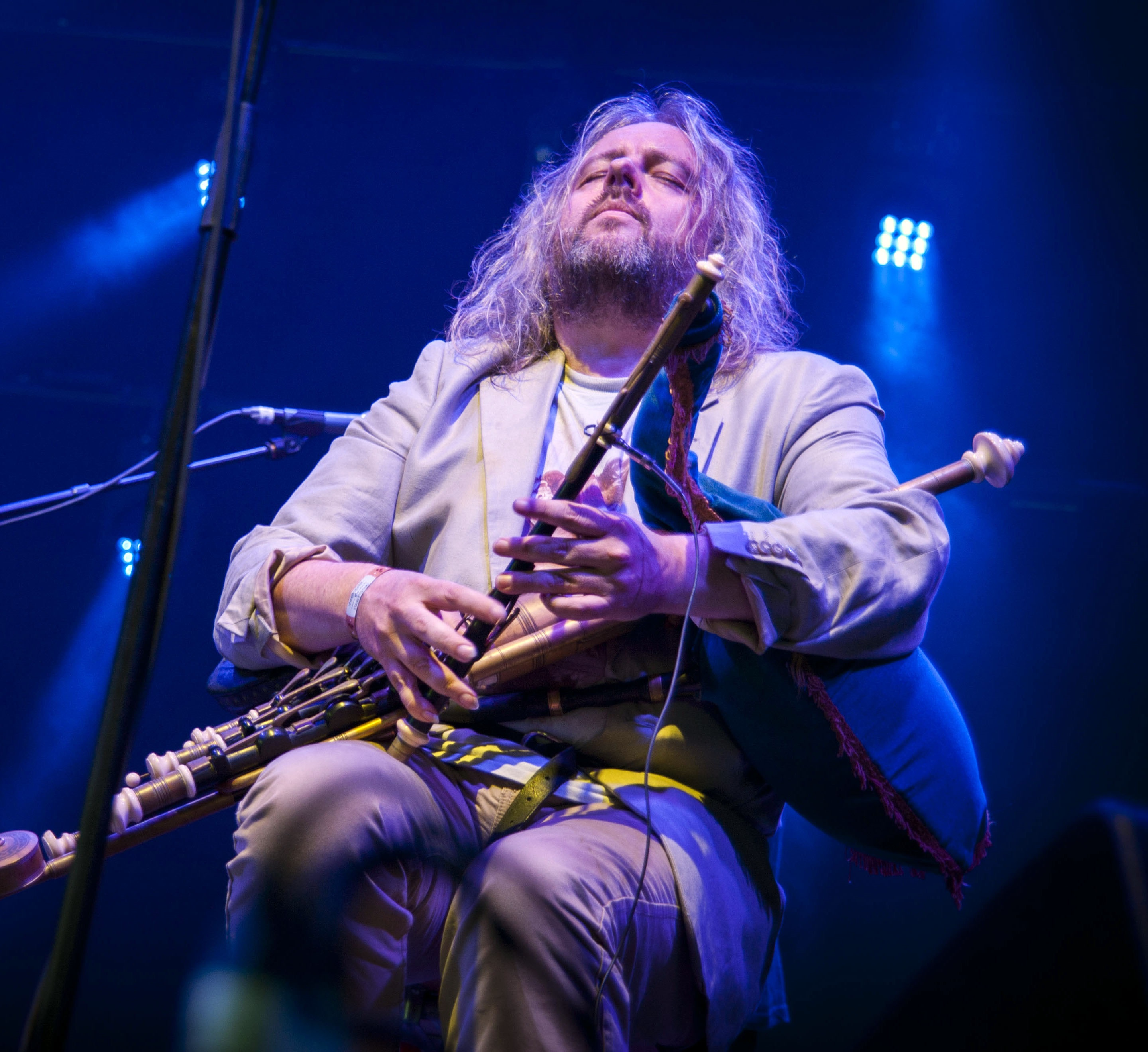
The members of Auri: Johanna Kurkela (left), Tuomas Holopainen (center), Troy Donockley (right)

Current

- Johanna Kurkela – lead vocals
- Tuomas Holopainen – keyboards
- Troy Donockley – guitars, Uilleann pipes, low whistle, vocals

Live and session

- Kai Hahto – drums, percussion
- Mikko Iivanainen – guitars, backing vocals
- Johanna Iivanainen – keyboards, backing vocals

== Discography ==
Studio albums

- Auri (2018) – No. 2 Finland
- II – Those We Don't Speak Of (2021) – No. 2 Finland
- III – Candles & Beginnings (2025)

Singles

- "Night 13" (2018)
- "The Space Between" (2018)
- "Pearl Diving" (2021)
- "The Valley" (2021)
- "Shieldmaiden" (2025)
- "Museum of Childhood" (2025)

Music videos

- "Night 13" (2017)
