= Auri (album) =

Studio album by Auri
- Released: 23 March 2018
- Studio: Real World
- Genre: Progressive folk
- Length: 56:17
- Label: Nuclear Blast Records

Auri chronology
Auri (2018)	II – Those We Don't Speak Of (2021)

Singles from Auri
- 1. "Night 13" Released: 1 February 2018; 2. "The Space Between" Released: 23 February 2018

Auri is the debut studio album by the Finnish progressive folk band of the same name. It was released on March 23, 2018 via Nuclear Blast Records.

== Reception ==
The Sonic Seducer magazine called the album "a blend of ethereous ethno pop, celtic folk, symphonic orchestration, melodic acoustics and a deeply impressive atmospheric frame", and noted how singer Johanna Kurkela's voice complemented the overall album.

Auri reached number 1 in the Finnish albums chart and entered the top 30 in the charts of Switzerland and Germany.

== Track listing ==
No.	Title	Length
1.	"The Space Between"	5:00
2.	"I Hope Your World Is Kind"	5:02
3.	"Skeleton Tree"	4:19
4.	"Desert Flower"	6:03
5.	"Night 13"	4:24
6.	"See"	5:12
7.	"The Name of the Wind"	3:50
8.	"Aphrodite Rising"	5:33
9.	"Savant"	4:27
10.	"Underthing Solstice"	7:06
11.	"Them Thar Chanterelles" (including "Liquor in the Well")	5:21
Total length:		56:17

== Personnel ==
All information from the album booklet.

Auri

- Johanna Kurkela – lead vocals, strings
- Troy Donockley – uilleann pipes, flutes, guitars, bodhrán, keyboards, male vocals (on track 4, 8 & 9)
- Tuomas Holopainen – keyboards, backing vocals

Additional musicians

- Frank Van Essen – drums, percussion, strings, violin
- Phil Barker – bass
- Jyrki Tulilahti – vocals
- Jonas Pap – cello
- Michael Gill – fiddle
- Lord Paddington – mandolin
- Joomba – equestrian atmospheres

Production

- Tero Kinnunen – engineering
- Tim Oliver – mixing
- Denis Blackman – mastering
- Johanna Kurkela – engineering
- Troy Donockley – engineering
- Tuomas Holopainen – engineering

== Charts ==
Chart (2018)	Peak position
Austrian Albums (Ö3 Austria)	72
Belgian Albums (Ultratop Flanders)	133
Dutch Albums (Album Top 100)	154
Finnish Albums (Suomen virallinen lista)	1
German Albums (Offizielle Top 100)	29
Swiss Albums (Schweizer Hitparade)	22
UK Rock & Metal Albums (OCC)	69
