= Heart Like a Grave =

Studio album by Insomnium
- Released: 4 October 2019
- Recorded: February 2019 – April 2019
- Studio: SF Sound Studio (Helsinki, Finland); Teemu Aalto Music Productions (Kotka, Finland)
- Genre: Melodic death metal
- Length: 60:56
- Label: Century Media
- Producer: Teemu Aalto; Insomnium

Insomnium chronology
Winter's Gate (2016)	Heart Like a Grave (2019)	Anno 1696 (2023)

Singles from Heart Like a Grave
- 1. "Valediction" Released: 23 August 2019; 2. "Heart Like a Grave" Released: 13 September 2019; 3. "Pale Morning Star" Released: 27 September 2019

Heart Like a Grave is the eighth studio album by Finnish melodic death metal band Insomnium, released on 4 October 2019 via Century Media. It is the first album to feature guitarist Jani Liimatainen. Loudwire named it one of the 50 best metal albums of 2019.

== Track listing ==
All lyrics are written by Niilo Sevänen, except "Valediction" written by Sevänen and Ville Friman.

No.	Title	Music	Length
1.	"Wail of the North"	Sevänen; Markus Vanhala	3:05
2.	"Valediction"	Friman	5:05
3.	"Neverlast"	Vanhala; Jani Liimatainen	4:46
4.	"Pale Morning Star"	Vanhala	8:58
5.	"And Bells They Toll"	Vanhala	6:01
6.	"The Offering"	Vanhala	4:59
7.	"Mute Is My Sorrow"	Liimatainen	6:02
8.	"Twilight Trails"	Sevänen; Liimatainen	7:06
9.	"Heart Like a Grave"	Vanhala	7:05
10.	"Karelia" (instrumental)	Sevänen	7:49
Total length:			60:56

Deluxe edition bonus tracks
No.	Title	Music	Length
11.	"The True Morning Star" (instrumental)	Vanhala	3:06
12.	"Karelia 2049" (instrumental)	Sevänen	6:43
Total length:			70:45

== Personnel ==
Credits are adapted from the album liner notes.

=== Insomnium ===
- Niilo Sevänen – bass, lead vocals
- Ville Friman – guitars, clean vocals
- Markus Vanhala – guitars
- Jani Liimatainen – guitars, clean vocals
- Markus Hirvonen – drums

=== Additional musician ===
- Teemu Aalto – backing vocals

=== Arrangements ===
- Insomnium – arrangements
- Teemu Aalto – arrangements
- Aleksi Munter – keyboards arrangements

=== Production and design ===
- Insomnium – production
- Teemu Aalto – production, recording (guitars, bass, vocals), mixing (bonus tracks), mastering (bonus tracks)
- Kimmo Perkkiö – recording (drums)
- Aleksi Munter – recording (keyboards)
- Jens Bogren – mixing, mastering
- Simo Heikkinen – artwork
- Vesa Ranta – artwork, photography (bootlet)
- Nora Dirkling – layout
- Jussi Ratilainen – photography (band)

== Charts ==
Chart (2019)	Peak position
Australian Digital Albums (ARIA)	28
Austrian Albums (Ö3 Austria)	23
Belgian Albums (Ultratop Flanders)	154
Belgian Albums (Ultratop Wallonia)	115
Finnish Albums (Suomen virallinen lista)	1
French Albums (SNEP)	178
German Albums (Offizielle Top 100)	10
Swiss Albums (Schweizer Hitparade)	15
