= Across the Dark =

Studio album by Insomnium
- Released: 7 September 2009
- Recorded: 23 March – 22 May 2009
- Genre: Melodic death metal
- Length: 45:40
- Label: Candlelight
- Producers: Samu Oittinen; Insomnium

Insomnium chronology
Above the Weeping World (2006)	Across the Dark (2009)	One for Sorrow (2011)

Across the Dark is the fourth studio album by Finnish melodic death metal band Insomnium. It was released on 7 September 2009 on Candlelight Records. The album features Jules Näveri from Profane Omen and Enemy of the Sun as guest vocalist and Aleksi Munter from Swallow the Sun as guest keyboardist. The album was chosen as "Album of the month September, 2009" by German online magazine Metal 1.

The song "Weighed Down with Sorrow" is dedicated to Miika Tenkula.

== Track listing ==
No.	Title	Lyrics	Music	Length
1.	"Equivalence"	Ville Friman	Friman	3:18
2.	"Down with the Sun"	Niilo Sevänen	Friman; Sevänen	4:22
3.	"Where the Last Wave Broke"	Friman	Friman	5:03
4.	"The Harrowing Years"	Sevänen	Friman; Sevänen	6:39
5.	"Against the Stream"	Friman	Friman	6:11
6.	"The Lay of Autumn"	Sevänen	Friman; Sevänen	9:08
7.	"Into the Woods"	Ville Vänni	Friman	5:08
8.	"Weighed Down with Sorrow"	Friman	Friman	5:51
Total length:				45:40

Special Edition bonus tracks
No.	Title	Lyrics	Music	Length
9.	"The New Beginning"	Friman	Friman	7:15
10.	"Into the Evernight"	Sevänen	Sevänen	5:28
Total length:				58:23

== Charts ==
Professional ratings
Review scores
Source	Rating
Allmusic	3.5/5 stars
Sputnikmusic	3.0/5 stars
MetalEater	A−
Blistering.com	8.5/10 stars
Thrash Hits	3.5/6 stars
Metal 1	8/10 stars

Chart (2009)	Peak position
Finnish Albums Chart	5

== Personnel ==
Insomnium

- Niilo Sevänen – vocals, bass
- Ville Friman – guitar
- Ville Vänni – guitar
- Marcus Hirvonen – drums

Additional Musicians

- Aleksi Munter (Swallow the Sun) – keyboards
- Jules Näveri (Profane Omen, Enemy of the Sun) – clean vocals (tracks 3, 4, 6)
