= Shadows of the Dying Sun =

Studio album by Insomnium
- Released: April 25, 2014
- Genre: Melodic death metal
- Length: 56:43
- Label: Century Media
- Producers: Teemu Aalto; Insomnium

Insomnium chronology
One for Sorrow (2011)	Shadows of the Dying Sun (2014)	Winter's Gate (2016)

Singles from Shadows of the Dying Sun
- 1. "While We Sleep" Released: April 15, 2014

Professional ratings
Review scores
Source	Rating
Loudwire	4/5 stars
Metal Storm	8.5 stars
About.com	4/5 stars
Sputnikmusic	4/5 stars

Shadows of the Dying Sun is the sixth studio album by Finnish melodic death metal band Insomnium. It was released in North America on April 29, 2014 via Century Media Records, and on April 25 in Finland, Germany, Austria, and Switzerland, the rest of Europe, as well as Australia and New Zealand on April 28. It is their first album with new guitarist Markus Vanhala after previous long-time guitarist Ville Vänni departed in 2011.

The song "Revelation", in the form of a lyric video, was released on March 21, 2014. A music video was made for the song and single "While We Sleep", which was released on April 7, 2014. The last song, "Black Heart Rebellion" was released on April 22, 2014.

== Track listing ==
No.	Title	Lyrics	Music	Length
1.	"The Primeval Dark"	Ville Friman	Friman	3:17
2.	"While We Sleep"	Friman	Friman	6:20
3.	"Revelation"	Niilo Sevänen	Markus Vanhala	5:15
4.	"Black Heart Rebellion"	Friman	Friman	7:03
5.	"Lose to Night"	Friman	Friman	4:59
6.	"Collapsing Words"	Friman	Friman	4:38
7.	"The River"	Sevänen	Sevänen; Vanhala	7:57
8.	"Ephemeral" (Album version)	Friman	Friman	4:01
9.	"The Promethean Song"	Sevänen	Vanhala	6:41
10.	"Shadows of the Dying Sun"	Friman	Friman	6:32
Total length:				56:43

Limited edition bonus tracks
No.	Title	Lyrics	Music	Length
11.	"Out to the Sea"	Friman	Friman; Vanhala	5:17
12.	"The Emergence"	Instrumental	Friman	1:46
13.	"The Swarm"	Instrumental	Friman	2:54
14.	"The Descent"	Instrumental	Friman	3:11
Total length:				1:10:08

== Personnel ==
Credits are adapted from the album liner notes.

Insomnium

- Niilo Sevänen – lead vocals, bass
- Ville Friman – guitars, clean vocals
- Markus Vanhala – guitars
- Marcus Hirvonen – drums

Additional musicians

- Teemu Aalto – backing vocals (on track 2, 5, 7, 9 & 10), additional guitars (track 5)
- Aleksi Munter – keyboards

Production and design

- Teemu Aalto – producer, recording (vocals, guitars, bass)
- Insomnium – producer
- Kimmo Perkkiö – recording (drums)
- Aleksi Munter & Hannu Honkonen – recording (keyboards)
- André Alvinzi – mixing at Fascination Street Studios
- Svante Forsbäck – mastering at Chartmakers
- Wille Naukkarinen – artwork
- Jussi Ratilainen – photography

== Charts ==
Chart	Peak position
Austrian Albums (Ö3 Austria)	38
Belgian Albums (Ultratop Wallonia)	178
Finnish Albums (Suomen virallinen lista)	2
German Albums (Offizielle Top 100)	18
Japanese Albums (Oricon)	32
Swiss Albums (Schweizer Hitparade)	33
UK Rock & Metal Albums (Official Charts)	15
US Independent Albums (Billboard)	44
US Top Hard Rock Albums (Billboard)	17
US Heatseekers Albums (Billboard)	5
