= Netherworlds =

Studio album by Insomnium
- Released: 16 October 2026
- Recorded: 2025–2026
- Studios: Sonic Pump Studios (Helsinki, Finland)
- Genre: Melodic death metal
- Length: 53:37
- Label: Century Media
- Producer: Miiro Varjus

Insomnium chronology
Anno 1696 (2023)	Netherworlds (2026)

Singles from Anno 1696
- 1. "Shadowlife" Released: 17 June 2026; 2. "Gleam in the Black" Released: 24 July 2026; 3. "Arch of the Sky" Released: 9 September 2026; 4. "The Hour Grows Late" Released: 16 October 2026

Professional ratings
Review scores
Source	Rating
Blabbermouth.net	9/10
Distorted Sound	9/10

Netherworlds is the tenth studio album by Finnish melodic death metal band Insomnium, released on 16 October 2026 via Century Media. Insomnium began working on the album in March 2025. The album's cover art, designed by Travis Smith, was unveiled on 22 July 2026, less than three weeks before more details were announced. It is the first album with guitarist/clean vocalist Tomy Laisto.

== Background and promotion ==
On 17 June 2026, the band released the album's first single "Shadowlife". On 24 July, the band released the album's second single "Gleam in the Black" alongside the album's announcement. Two months later, on 9 September, the band released the album's third single "Arch of the Sky". Finally, the album's fourth single "The Hour Grows Late" was released on 16 October, the day the album was released, featuring Amorphis members Tomi Joutsen, Tomi Koivusaari and Santeri Kallio.

In October 2026, the band embarked on a tour through Finland to promote Netherworlds, with support from Kaunis Kuolematon. They will also embark on a North American tour in November and December, together with Amorphis.

== Track listing ==
Netherworlds track listing
No.	Title	Lyrics	Music	Length
1.	"The Cold Song"	Henry Purcell	Henry Purcell	2:18
2.	"Shadowlife"	Niilo Sevänen	Markus Vanhala	4:41
3.	"Remembrance"	Sevänen, Friman	Ville Friman	5:01
4.	"Gleam in the Black"	Sevänen	Sevänen, Friman	4:29
5.	"The Hour Grows Late"	Sevänen	Vanhala	8:01
6.	"Arch of the Sky"	Sevänen, Friman	Friman	6:14
7.	"Pathways of the Night"	Sevänen	Vanhala	4:52
8.	"Ethereal Sleep"	Sevänen, Friman	Friman	5:38
9.	"The Banished"	Sevänen	Friman, Tomy Laisto	5:26
10.	"Journey's End"	Sevänen	Vanhala	6:57
Total length:				53:37

== Personnel ==
=== Insomnium ===
- Niilo Sevänen – lead vocals, bass
- Ville Friman – guitars, clean vocals
- Markus Vanhala – guitars, clean vocals
- Tomy Laisto – guitars, clean vocals
- Markus Hirvonen – drums

=== Additional musicians ===
- Aleksi Munter – keyboards
- Santeri Kallio – keyboards (track 5)
- Tomi Joutsen – guest vocals (track 5)
- Tomi Koivusaari – guest vocals (track 5)
- Jonathan Hutchings – narration (track 10)

=== Production and design ===
- Miiro Varjus – production, recording
- Otto Uusitalo – recording (drums, acoustic guitars)
- Jens Bogren – mixing
- Tony Lindgren – mastering
- Rosku Lohiniva – editing
- Travis Smith – artwork

== Charts ==
Chart performance for Anno 1696
Chart (2023)	Peak position
Austrian Albums (Ö3 Austria)	11
Belgian Albums (Ultratop Flanders)	117
German Albums (Offizielle Top 100)	8
Swiss Albums (Schweizer Hitparade)	5
