= Black Anvil =

American black metal band

- Origin: New York City, New York, United States
- Genres: Black metal, thrash metal
- Years active: 2007–present
- Labels: Relapse, Monumentum
- Members: Paul Delaney; Raeph Glicken; Jeremy Sosville; Travis Bacon; Alex Volonino
- Past members: Gary Bennett
- Website: blackanvil.bandcamp.com

Black Anvil is an American black metal band from New York City. It formed in 2007 with Paul Delaney, Gary Bennett, and Raeph Glicken. When asked, Delaney said "Gary actually came up with name, which is a cross between a Black Sabbath reference and a Judas Priest song." It is one of the few bands in the New York City black metal scene.

== History ==
=== Early years and Time Insults the Mind (2007–2009) ===
The band formed in New York City in 2007 and signed to Monumentum Records once the members left the hardcore punk band Kill Your Idols, who disbanded at that time. On October 28, 2008, the band released their debut album Time Insults the Mind on Monumentum Records. The band took a year to write it and went to record it in Queens, New York, and recorded it all in one weekend. Afterwards, they started playing gigs all over New York City. The band also said something about the meaning of the album title saying "That it keeps going. (Time that is…) It’s a line in "Margin for Terror" that stuck out when we were thinking of titles."

=== Triumvirate (2010–2011) ===
On June 5, 2010, it was announced that the band signed to Relapse Records. The band began to record their second album in January 2010 in the studio owned by Mark Mendoza of the heavy metal band Twisted Sister with engineer George Fullan. On September 28th, the band released their second album Triumvirate on Relapse Records and reissued their debut in the fall of 2010 on Relapse Records. In an interview, Paul Delaney said "Relapse’s interest in us and our respect for them proves none of that style shit should matter. We’re here to bring a malicious record to the table for you all. We currently have four songs demoed and they’re so dangerous sounding." During March 13, they played at the Scion Rock Fest in Ohio with Voivod, Black Tusk, and Brutal Truth. They also began to tour around United States but ended the major tour in the last two shows being in Canada. The band were going to have a tour called Lawless States of Heretika and Behemoth had joined their tour with Watain and Withered involved as well. However, it was confirmed in August 2010 that Behemoth were forced to leave the tour with them across America due to health issues Behemoth member Nergal was having. Later on August 27, 2010, they performed a major show at the Hostile City Deathfest in Philadelphia. They also toured from November 6, 2010, to December 4, 2010, with Swedish black metal band Watain and American blackened death metal band Goatwhore. The band also had a major tour announced in January 2011 to begin at the end of May through beginning of June during 2011, touring with bands like Aura Noir, Eyehategod, Marduk, and others.

=== Touring, new member and Hail Death (2012–2015) ===
The band said that they are working on a new album and they have written some tracks and will enter the studio to record it in early 2013. In an interview, band member Paul Delaney said

This is a darker, deeper record than our previous releases and a natural progression down the chosen path. Musically, and lyrically… we will take our form to the next level.

The band also took another tour with Watain in the middle of May 2012. During the fall of 2012, the band acquired a 4th member as Jeremy Sosville joined the band on guitar. The band announced his name is Sos and that he plays the second guitar. The band performed a major show with the death/doom band Evoken at Saint Vitus in Brooklyn, New York, on December 21, 2012. The band also performed another major show at the Winter's Wake festival in Pittsburgh on February 22, 2012. The band worked with J. Robbins of Jawbox. The band announced their upcoming album is called Hail Death and its release date is on May 27, 2014. The band says the album has a lot of influences from albums like Master of Puppets by Metallica and Destroyer by Kiss. In an interview, Paul Delaney said

He's got a really good style of making records and I knew he would understand that we wanted to make this sound live and organic as opposed to tight and compressed... I wanted it to be a little more rock 'n' roll sounding because I felt the songs were a little bigger and structured. It tells a story from beginning to end and the recording reflects that.

Paul also said the making of the new album wasn't easy due to hard times in his life he was going through.

=== As Was and Regenesis (2016–present) ===
In November 2016, the band announced their fourth album, As Was, would be released on January 13, 2017. The band went on tour in North America in January and February 2017 with Mayhem and Inquisition in support of the album.

In August 2022, the band announced their fifth album, Regenesis, which was released on November 4. The band toured in the fall of 2022 in support of the album with Cannibal Corpse, Dark Funeral, and Immolation. In spring of 2023, the band toured with Enslaved and Insomnium.

== Musical style and influences ==
The band's musical genres are black metal and thrash metal. However, when asked about what they think of ones who talk about who is the most true black metal band, the band said:

We've dealt with shit from day one. From friends, reviewers, fucking bloggers, or whatever you want to call them. I don’t really give a shit what anyone thinks. It’s easy to put on a record and gather an opinion based on shit you have no idea about. Our record has a bigger production, which to me is still way raw. We recorded the album in 3 days, and our shit has our own twist to it musically. It’s not ‘real’ enough for people, yet these are the people that do nothing but sit home, sit on the internet & judge what other people do and create. These people do not know us, do not know what we are about, at ALL. I don’t need to make anyone else happy with what this band does. It’s not about pleasing the listener. If you are pleased, then great. If not, go fuck yourself. We could easily be carbon copies of other bands, but we still write what we want based on our reaction. Not that we're this original band, to me we are, in the grand scheme we're not. I think real recognizes real in the end of the day.

The band has cited Poison Idea, Celtic Frost, Black Sabbath, Metallica, Agnostic Front, Possessed, Sodom, Kreator, Carnivore, Venom, Twisted Sister, Mercyful Fate, Darkthrone, Bad Brains, and Black Flag as their influences.

== Discography ==
Studio albums

- Time Insults the Mind (2008)
- Triumvirate (2010)
- Hail Death (2014)
- As Was (2017)
- Regenesis (2022)

== Members ==
Current members

- Paul Delaney – lead vocals, bass (2007–present)
- Raeph Glicken – drums, backing vocals (2007–present)
- Alex Volonino – guitars (2022–present)
- Michael Dimmitt – guitars (2024–present)

Former members

- Gary Bennett – guitars (2007–2016)
- Jeremy Sosville – guitars (2012–2024)
- Travis Bacon – guitars (2016–2022)
