= Winter's Gate =

Studio album by Insomnium
- Released: September 23, 2016
- Recorded: March – April 2016
- Studios: SF Sound Studio; Scoring Helsinki; Studio Korkeakoski
- Genres: Melodic death metal; progressive metal
- Length: 40:02
- Label: Century Media
- Producers: Teemu Aalto; Insomnium

Insomnium chronology
Shadows of the Dying Sun (2014)	Winter's Gate (2016)	Heart Like a Grave (2019)

Professional ratings
Review scores
Source	Rating
Exclaim!	8/10
Sputnikmusic	3.2/5
Metal Injection	9/10
Loud Online	9.5/10 stars

Winter's Gate is the seventh studio album by Finnish melodic death metal band Insomnium. It was released worldwide on September 23, 2016, via Century Media Records. It is a concept album said to be about "a group of Vikings who set out to find a fabled island west of Ireland, despite the treacherous winter drawing near."

The album consists of a single 40-minute track. For streaming and download services, it was split into seven separate tracks despite containing six movements denoted in the lyrics. These movements are noted in the tracklist below. For vinyl, the song was split across sides between parts 3 and 4.

== Track listing ==
All lyrics are written by Niilo Sevänen; all music is composed by Ville Friman, Markus Vanhala & Sevänen.

No.	Title	Length
1.	"Winter's Gate": "Part 1" (Slaughter Moon); "Part 2" (The Golden Wolf, Part I); "Part 3" (The Golden Wolf, Part II); "Part 4" (At the Gates of Winter); "Part 5" (The Gate Opens, Part I); "Part 6" (The Gate Opens, Part II); "Part 7" (The Final Stand / Into the Sleep); "	40:02: 6:14; 6:37; 5:51; 5:26; 4:20; 5:13; 6:19

== Credits ==
Credits are adapted from the album liner notes.

Insomnium

- Niilo Sevänen – lead vocals, bass
- Ville Friman – guitars, clean vocals
- Markus Vanhala – guitars
- Markus Hirvonen – drums

Additional musicians

- Teemu Aalto – backing vocals

Arrangements and compositions

- Insomnium – arrangements
- Teemu Aalto – arrangements
- Aleksi Munter – keyboard composition, keyboard arrangements
- Ville Friman – keyboard composition
- Markus Vanhala – keyboard composition
- Niilo Sevänen – keyboard composition

Production and artwork

- Insomnium – production
- Teemu Aalto – production, recording (guitar, bass, vocals)
- Kimmo Perkkiö – recording (drums)
- Hannu Honkonen – recording (keyboard)
- Aleksi Munter – recording (keyboard)
- Dan Swanö – mixing, mastering
- Teemu Tähkänen – artwork
- Jussi Ratilainen – photography
- Nora Dirkling – layout
- Tuomas Puumalainen – translation

Studios

- SF Sound Studio – recording (drums)
- Scoring Helsinki – recording (keyboard)
- Studio Korkeakoski – recording (guitar, bass, vocals)
- Unisound – mixing, mastering

== Charts ==
Chart (2016)	Peak position
Austrian Albums (Ö3 Austria)	27
Belgian Albums (Ultratop Flanders)	186
Belgian Albums (Ultratop Wallonia)	92
Finnish Albums (Suomen virallinen lista)	1
French Albums (SNEP)	104
German Albums (Offizielle Top 100)	19
Swiss Albums (Schweizer Hitparade)	27
