= Insomnium =

Finnish melodic death metal band

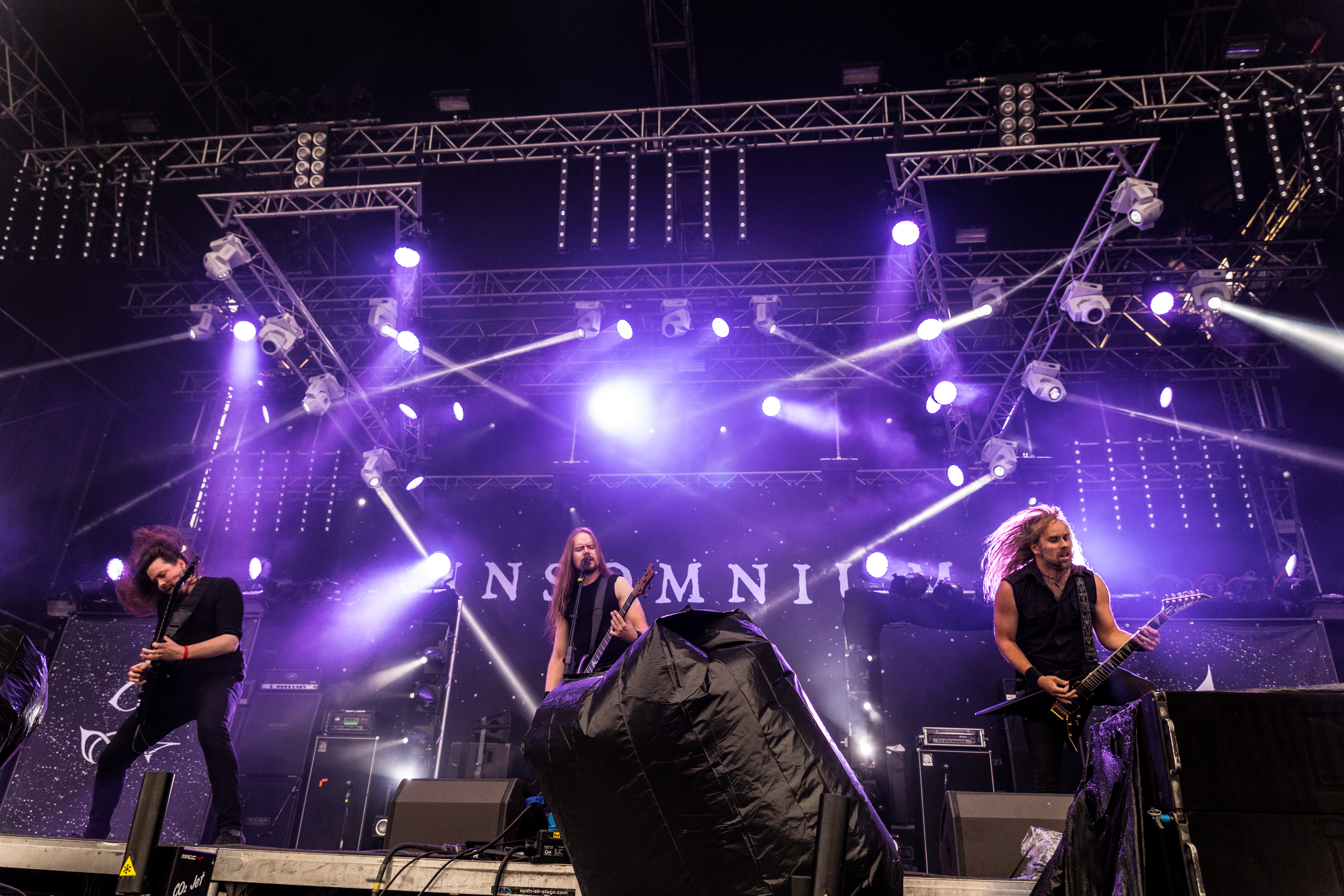
- Insomnium performing at Party.San 2017

Background information
- Origin: Joensuu, Finland
- Genre: Melodic death metal
- Years active: 1997–present
- Labels: Candlelight; Century Media
- Members: Niilo Sevänen; Ville Friman; Markus Vanhala; Markus Hirvonen; Tomy Laisto
- Past members: Tapani Pesonen; Timo Partanen; Ville Vänni; Jani Liimatainen
- Website: www.insomnium.net

Insomnium is a Finnish melodic death metal band formed in Joensuu in 1997. Their sound and lyrics portray darkness, sorrow, loss, pain, and nature. Their music includes progressive metal and doom metal.

== History ==
On 9 September 2011, Insomnium released the music video "Through the Shadows" from their 2011 album, One for Sorrow.

In November 2011, Insomnium headlined their first European tour with support from Before the Dawn and MyGRAIN. During April 2012, Insomnium toured the U.K. as the main support act for British gothic metal band Paradise Lost. Vreid was also on the tour as a supporting opening act.

On 19 September 2013, Insomnium released "Ephemeral", a single from their 2014 album, Shadows of the Dying Sun, via Century Media Records. It was the first track to feature new guitarist Markus Vanhala (Omnium Gatherum), who replaced Ville Vänni in 2011.

On 29 April 2014, Insomnium released their sixth studio album, Shadows of the Dying Sun. On 30 April 2014, they made a guest appearance on Epica's CD release show at 013 in the Netherlands.

On 19 May 2016, Insomnium announced their seventh studio album, Winter's Gate, released on 23 September. It was a concept album, consisting of one 40-minute track, about "a group of Vikings who set out to find a fabled island west of Ireland, despite the treacherous winter drawing near." This album was based on the short story by Niilo, "Winter's Gate", or "Talven Portti" in the original Finnish. This story won or was nominated for many Finnish awards.

In 2019, they announced their eighth album, Heart Like a Grave, released on 4 October 2019. With the album announcement, they confirmed that guitarist Jani Liimatainen had joined the band full time. He had occasionally filled in for Ville Friman on tours since 2015.

Insomnium released the EP Argent Moon on 17 September 2021. They talked about plans for a ninth studio album to be released in 2022. In 2022, they announced their ninth album, Anno 1696, released on 24 February 2023. Like Winter's Gate, the album is based on a short story by Niilo. In spring of 2023, the band toured with Enslaved and Black Anvil.

In March 2025, Niilo Sevänen confirmed that a tenth studio album by Insomnium was in the works and planned for a 2026 release. The album name, Netherworlds, and cover were revealed in July 2026. On 16 January 2026, touring guitarist Tomy Laisto was announced as an official member.

== Members ==
=== Current members ===
- Niilo Sevänen – bass, unclean vocals (1997–present)
- Ville Friman – guitars (1997–present); clean vocals (2011–present)
- Markus Hirvonen – drums (1997–present)
- Markus Vanhala – guitars (2011–present)
- Tomy Laisto – guitars (2026–present; touring 2024–2026)

=== Former members ===
- Tapani Pesonen – guitars (1997–1998); drums (1997)
- Timo Partanen – guitars (1998–2001)
- Ville Vänni – guitars (2001–2011)
- Jani Liimatainen – guitars, clean vocals (2019–2024; touring 2015–2019)

=== Touring members ===
- Tuomas Jäppinen – guitars (2011)
- Mike Bear – vocals, bass (2015)
- Nick Cordle – guitars (2022–2024)
- Brandon Ellis – guitars (2024)

== Discography ==
=== Studio albums ===
List of studio albums, with selected chart positions
Title	Details	Peak chart positions							
Title	Details	FIN	AUT	BEL (FL)	BEL (WA)	FRA	GER	JPN	SWI
In the Halls of Awaiting	Released: 30 April 2002; Label: Candlelight; Formats: CD, LP, DL	—	—	—	—	—	—	—	—
Since the Day It All Came Down	Released: 4 May 2004; Label: Candlelight; Formats: CD, LP, DL	—	—	—	—	—	—	—	—
Above the Weeping World	Released: 17 October 2006; Label: Candlelight; Formats: CD, LP, DL	9	—	—	—	—	—	—	—
Across the Dark	Released: 7 September 2009; Label: Candlelight; Formats: CD, CD+DVD, LP, DL	5	—	—	—	—	—	—	—
One for Sorrow	Released: 18 October 2011; Label: Century Media; Formats: CD, LP, DL	6	—	—	—	—	95	—	—
Shadows of the Dying Sun	Released: 29 April 2014; Label: Century Media; Formats: CD, LP, DL	2	38	—	—	178	18	287	23
Winter's Gate	Released: 23 September 2016; Label: Century Media; Formats: CD, LP, DL	1	27	124	92	184	19	—	17
Heart Like a Grave	Released: 4 October 2019; Label: Century Media; Formats: CD, LP, DL	1	—	154	115	178	10	—	15
Anno 1696	Released: 24 February 2023; Label: Century Media; Formats: CD, LP, DL	1	15	165	—	—	5	—	10
Netherworlds	Released: 16 October 2026; Label: Century Media; Formats: CD, LP, DL	1	11	117	20	— (Note: Netherworlds did not enter the French Top Albums chart, but peaked at number 58 on the French Physical Albums chart.)	8	—	5
"—" denotes a recording that did not chart.

=== Singles ===
List of singles
Title	Details
"Where the Last Wave Broke"	Released: 24 August 2009; Label: Candlelight
"Weather the Storm"	Released: 25 April 2011; Label: Century Media
"Ephemeral"	Released: 23 September 2013; Label: Century Media
"While We Sleep"	Released: 8 April 2014; Label: Century Media
"The Conjurer"	Released: 19 March 2021; Label: Century Media
"The Reticent"	Released: 21 May 2021; Label: Century Media
"Song of the Dusk"	Released: 1 September 2023; Label: Century Media

=== Demos ===
- Demo 1999 (1999)
- Underneath the Moonlit Waves (2000)

=== EPs ===
- Ephemeral (2013)
- Argent Moon (2021)
- Songs of the Dusk (2023)
