= Spirit world =

Spirit world may refer to:

== In religion ==
- Spirit world (Spiritualism)
- Spirit world (Latter Day Saints)
- Vaikuntha, often referred to as the "spiritual sky" or "spiritual world" in Hindu contexts
- Guinee, a spirit world in Vodou
- Dausos of Lithuanian mythology
- The Dreaming of the Australian aborigines
- The noosphere of Vladimir Vernadsky and Pierre Teilhard de Chardin

== In media ==
- Spirit World (film), a 2024 fantasy drama film
- Umbra (World of Darkness), the spirit world of the role-playing game
- Spirit World (Avatar: The Last Airbender), the parallel universe in the Nickelodeon animated television series Avatar: The Last Airbender
- The Nevernever, the spirit world of The Dresden Files novel series
- Spirit World 2024, a France, Japan and Singapore co-production film
- The Spirit World, Map 28 in video game DOOM II

== See also ==
- Astral plane
- Heaven
- Hell
- Intermediate state, a person's interim existence between one's death and one's resurrection from the dead in Christian eschatology
- Otherworld
- Shamanism
- Spirit
- Spirituality
- Spiritwalker (Native)
- Underworld
