= Netherlands (disambiguation) =

The Netherlands (Dutch: Nederland) is a country located in Northwestern Europe.

The Netherlands or Nederland may also refer to:

== Geography ==
- Kingdom of the Netherlands, a constitutional monarchy consisting of the constituent country of the Netherlands in Europe (also including three islands in the Caribbean sea) and the constituent countries of Aruba, Curaçao, and Sint Maarten in the Caribbean Sea
- The Low Countries, also known as the Netherlands, a historical region consisting of the Netherlands, Belgium, Luxembourg, and sometimes portions of northern France and western Germany
- Netherlands, Missouri, a community in the United States of America

=== Nederland ===
- Nederland, Texas, a city in the United States
- Nederland, Colorado, a town in the United States
- Nederland, Overijssel, a hamlet in the municipality of Steenwijkerland, Netherlands

=== Historical ===
- Burgundian Netherlands, the lands belonging to the Duchy of Burgundy (1384–1477)
- Habsburg Netherlands, the lands belonging to the House of Habsburg (1477–1556)
- Spanish Netherlands, the lands belonging to the Spanish Empire (1556–1581/1713)
  - The Northern Netherlands, succession from the Spanish Netherlands to form the Dutch Republic (1581–1794)
  - The Southern Netherlands, the lands in the southern part, remaining under Spanish control (1581–1713)
    - Later the Austrian Netherlands (1713–1794)
- United Kingdom of the Netherlands, consisting of modern-day The Netherlands, Belgium and Luxembourg (1815–1839)

== Political ==
- Netherlands (European Parliament constituency), in the European Parliament
- Greater Netherlands, a right-wing idea based on the unification of Flanders and the Netherlands

== Sports ==
- Category:National sports teams of the Netherlands, for teams called "Netherlands"

== Arts and literature ==
- Netherland (novel), a novel by Joseph O'Neill
- "Netherlands" a 7th-season episode of Touched by an Angel
- "Netherlands", a song by Little River Band from the album No Reins
- Nether Lands, an album by Dan Fogelberg

== See also ==
- Terminology of the Low Countries, for information about the difference in use between the Netherlands, Dutch and Holland
- Dutchland (disambiguation)
- Holland (disambiguation)
- Dutch (disambiguation)
- Nether (disambiguation)
- Land (disambiguation)
