= Imaginaerum World Tour =

2012–2013 concert tour by Nightwish

- Tour by Nightwish
- Poster for the concert in Gothenburg, Sweden, scheduled to April 10, 2012
- Location: Asia; Europe; North America; Oceania; South America
- Associated album: Imaginaerum
- Start date: January 19, 2012
- End date: August 11, 2013
- Legs: 9
- No. of shows: 104

Nightwish concert chronology
- Dark Passion Play World Tour (2007–2009); Imaginaerum World Tour (2012–2013); Endless Forms Most Beautiful World Tour (2015–2016)

The Imaginaerum World Tour was a concert tour by the Finnish symphonic metal band Nightwish, in support of their seventh studio album, Imaginaerum.

The tour started in Los Angeles, USA, on January 21, 2012, and then the band played an arena tour in Europe between March and May, and the group has also performed in North and Latin America later that year. In 2013, the band performed in Asia and Oceania, finishing the tour with festival shows in Europe, in a 104 concert tour that finished on August 11, 2013.

A "secret" concert under the pseudonym "Rubber Band of Wolves" was held at the Key Club in Hollywood, California, on January 19, 2012.

On September 28 in Denver, Colorado, Anette was rushed to the hospital and missed the show that night. Kamelot backup vocalists Elize Ryd and Alissa White-Gluz stepped in and performed five songs. Anette did her final show on the September 29th show in Salt Lake City, before parting ways with the band on October 1. Floor Jansen replaced Olzon on the remainder of the tour.

== Set list ==
The following set list was performed at a concert during the 70000 Tons of Metal festival, but has since had alterations to it:

- "Finlandia" (intro)
- "Storytime"
- "Wish I Had an Angel"
- "Amaranth" (with long outro)
- "Scaretale"
- "The Siren" (with "Arabesque" and "Tutankhamen" samples)
- "Slow, Love Slow"
- "I Want My Tears Back" (featuring Troy Donockley)
- "The Crow, the Owl and the Dove" (featuring Troy Donockley)
- "The Islander" (acoustic version, featuring Troy Donockley)
- "Nemo" (acoustic version, with "Angels Fall First" samples and featuring Troy Donockley)
- "Last of the Wilds" (featuring Troy Donockley)
- "Planet Hell" (with "Stargazers", "Gethsemane" and "Wayfarer" samples. First performance live since 2005)
- "Song of Myself" ("Love" section omitted)
- "Last Ride of the Day"
  Encore
- "The Poet and the Pendulum"
- "Over the Hills and Far Away" (Gary Moore cover, featuring Troy Donockley. First performance live since 2005)
- "Imaginaerum" (outro)

Notes

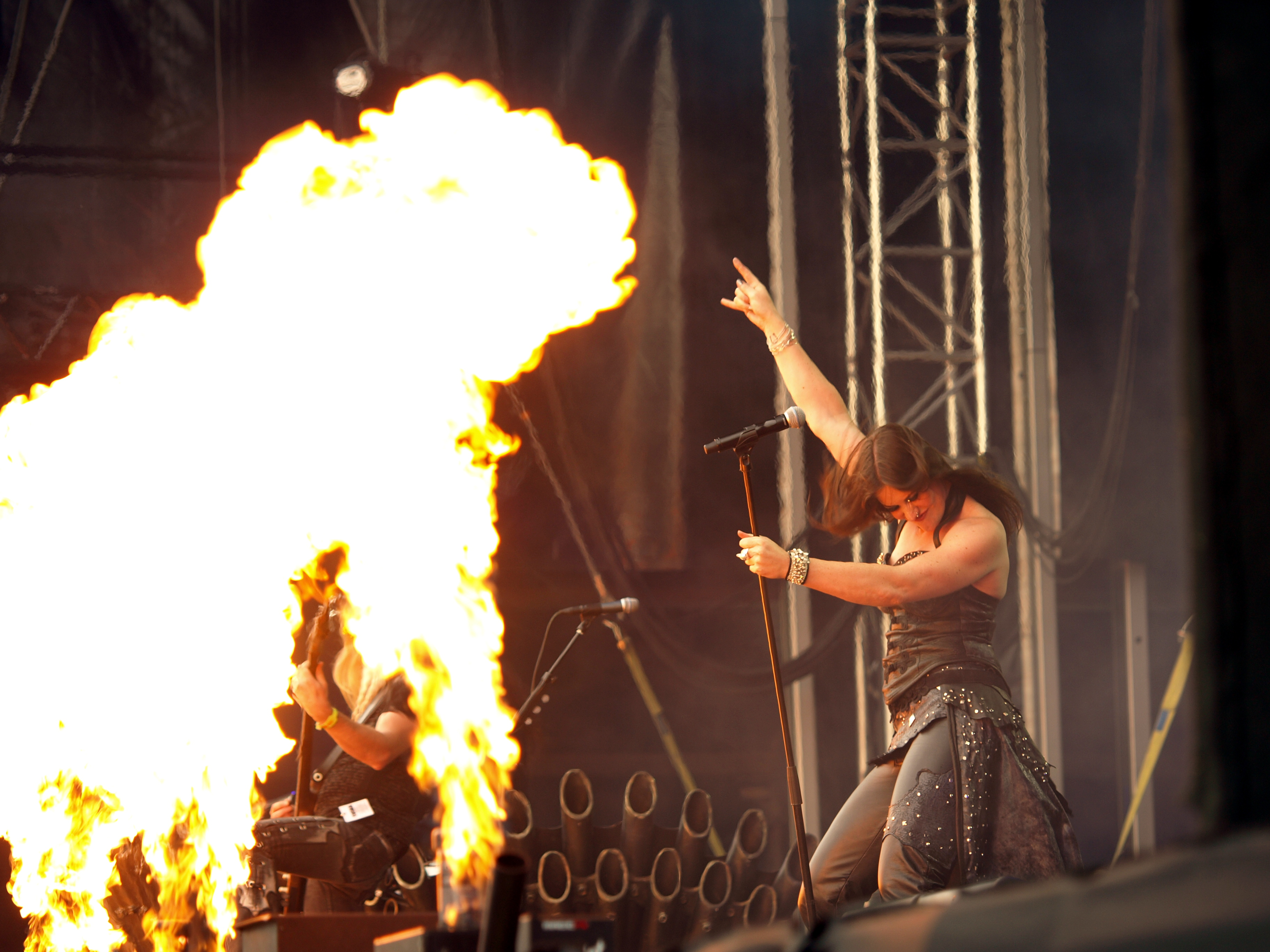
Anette Olzon was replaced by Dutch singer Floor Jansen (pictured) in 2012, during the North American leg of the tour.

One of the band's performances during the 70000 Tons of Metal festival included the song "Dead to the World" and another performance included "Romanticide."

When the band kicked off the first leg of their tour in March, the set list remained mostly unchanged, but with "Finlandia" moved to the beginning of the encore and "Taikatalvi" inserted to open the show. "The Siren" would occasionally be replaced with "Ever Dream" or "Dead to the World".

Starting with the concert held on March 4, "The Poet and the Pendulum" and "Over the Hills and Far Away" were moved up to close the show, and "Song of Myself" and "Last Ride of the Day" were moved down to serve as the encore.

The concert held on March 9, 2012, at the Paviljonki Areena in Jyväskylä, Finland included the world premiere of the song "Ghost River" following "Planet Hell". The following concert on March 10 included "Dead to the World" in place of "The Poet and the Pendulum". These songs have been used later on.

The concert held on March 17, 2012, in Ukraine included "Come Cover Me". The song was played between Scaretale and The Siren. The song was performed again on April 13, 2012 in the Netherlands, and remained part of the set list until April 16. On these dates, "The Siren" was not played, and "Come Cover Me" was played between "I Want My Tears Back" and "The Crow, the Owl and the Dove" with Marco's voice on the chorus, new arrangements and Troy playing. This altered setlist was used again on April 21, remaining that way through May 3.

On 5 May 2012, "Dark Chest of Wonders" was played following "Ghost River", with "Dead to the World" played in place of "The Siren". "Dead to the World" was returned to its proper place in the set on 6 May, but "Ever Dream" was played in place of "The Siren".

Nightwish kicked off its North American Tour on September 12, 2012, with a few changes to the set list. "Roll Tide" was played as the intro instead of "Taikatalvi", "Dead to the World" was played in place of "The Siren", and "Dark Chest of Wonders" was played in place of "Ghost River".

The second performance in Atlanta, United States, on September 13, 2012, of the beginning North-American Tour included "Higher Than Hope" played before "Over the Hills and Far Away", only played four times before with Anette Olzon. This show also included "The Siren" instead of "Dead to the World" and "Ghost River" instead of "Dark Chest of Wonders", and excluded "The Crow, the Owl and the Dove".

The concert held on 15 September 2012, in the Beacon Theatre, New York included "Escapist" played in place of "Planet Hell".

The concert held on 16 September 2012 featured "7 Days to the Wolves" played instead of "Planet Hell", with "Planet Hell" played instead of "Scaretale". This show was also the last to feature "The Siren" instead of "Dead to the World", which was played in place of "Higher Than Hope" for this performance.

From September 17, 2012 onward, the set list reverted to its format at the start of the North American tour, but with "Ghost River" played in place of "Dark Chest of Wonders". "Dark Chest of Wonders" was played after "Ghost River" on September 21; "Dead to the World" was replaced with "7 Days to the Wolves" on the same date.

"7 Days to the Wolves" was played in place of "Scaretale" on September 23 and 24.

On September 24, 25 and 27, "The Crow, the Owl and the Dove" was omitted and "Dark Chest of Wonders" was played following "Ghost River". The concert held on September 27 also included "The Siren" played in place of "Dead to the World".

Olzon was hospitalized due to illness during the concert held on September 28, 2012 in Denver, Colorado, so Elize Ryd and Alissa White-Gluz of Kamelot filled in on vocals. The shortened set list included the world premiere of "Rest Calm".

The concert held on September 29 omitted "Dead to the World" and included "Rest Calm" after "Ghost River".

Following the departure of Anette Olzon on October 1, 2012, Floor Jansen agreed to continue touring with the group. The set list featuring Jansen was largely unchanged from that featuring Olzon, but with "Dark Chest of Wonders" following "Wish I Had an Angel", "Slow, Love, Slow" and "Over the Hills and Far Away" omitted, and "Song of Myself" and "Last Ride of the Day" moved up to follow "Ghost River", meaning the band no longer performed an encore.

"Slow, Love, Slow" was reintroduced into the set list on October 3, 2012 following "Dead to the World", with "The Crow, the Owl and the Dove" removed.

The concert held on October 6, 2012, included "Higher Than Hope" played following "Ghost River" and omitted "Dead to the World".

Beginning October 7, 2012, "Dead to the World" was replaced with "Ever Dream".

The concert held on 10 October 2012, at Emo's, in Austin, Texas, included "Ghost Love Score" played following "Song of Myself"; "Scaretale" was not played. This change in the set list was used in later shows.

Beginning October 11, "Wish I Had an Angel" and "Dark Chest of Wonders" were switched in the set.

"The Siren" was played first time with Floor at Birmingham on 6 November 2012.

"Arabesque" was played first time at Hartwall Arena, Finland, and featured fire dancers. The first public screening of Imaginaerum took place after the concert.

"Wishmaster" was played first time with Floor at Mexico City on 29 November 2012.

"7 Days to the Wolves" was played first time with Floor at Adelaide on 18 January 2013.

== Tour dates ==
List of 2012 concerts, showing date, city, country, venue and support act(s)
Date	City	Country	Venue	Support Act(s)
January 19, 2012	Los Angeles	United States	Key Club	—N/a
January 21, 2012	Los Angeles	United States	Gibson Amphitheatre	Amorphis
January 23, 2012 (Note: The January 23, 2012, concert was a part of 70000 Tons of Metal.)	Miami	United States	Majesty of the Seas	—N/a
March 2, 2012	Joensuu	Finland	Areena	Poisonblack
March 3, 2012	Sotkamo	Finland	Vuokattihalli	Poisonblack
March 4, 2012	Oulu	Finland	Teatria 25	Poisonblack
March 9, 2012	Jyväskylä	Finland	Paviljönki Areena	Poisonblack
March 10, 2012	Helsinki	Finland	Ice Hall	Poisonblack
March 11, 2012	Tampere	Finland	Ice Hall	Poisonblack
March 14, 2012	Saint Petersburg	Russia	Lensoveta Culture Palace	—N/a
March 15, 2012	Moscow	Russia	Crocus City Hall	—N/a
March 17, 2012	Kyiv	Ukraine	MVC Arena	—N/a
April 10, 2012	Gothenburg	Sweden	Lisebergshallen	Battle Beast
April 11, 2012	Copenhagen	Denmark	Falconer Amphitheatre	Battle Beast; Eklipse
April 13, 2012	Amsterdam	Netherlands	Heineken Music Hall	Battle Beast; Eklipse
April 14, 2012	Düsseldorf	Germany	ISS Dome	Battle Beast; Eklipse
April 16, 2012	Brussels	Belgium	Forest National Arena	Battle Beast; Eklipse
April 17, 2012	Paris	France	Palais Omnisports	Battle Beast; Eklipse
April 18, 2012	Nantes	France	Le Zénith	Battle Beast; Eklipse
April 20, 2012	Lyon	France	Halle Tony Garnier	Battle Beast; Eklipse
April 21, 2012	Esch-sur-Alzette	Luxembourg	Rockhal	Battle Beast; Eklipse
April 23, 2012	Frankfurt	Germany	Jahrhunderthalle	Battle Beast; Eklipse
April 24, 2012	Zürich	Switzerland	Hallenstadion	Battle Beast; Eklipse
April 25, 2012	Milan	Italy	Datch Forum di Assago	Battle Beast; Eklipse
April 27, 2012	Vienna	Austria	Gasometer	Battle Beast; Eklipse
April 29, 2012	Budapest	Hungary	Sports Arena	Battle Beast; Eklipse
April 30, 2012	Prague	Czech Republic	Tesla Arena	Battle Beast; Eklipse
May 1, 2012	Leipzig	Germany	Arena	Battle Beast; Eklipse
May 3, 2012	Hamburg	Germany	Color Line Arena	Battle Beast; Eklipse
May 5, 2012	Nuremberg	Germany	Arena	Battle Beast; Eklipse
May 6, 2012	Stuttgart	Germany	Hanns-Martin-Schleyer-Halle	Battle Beast; Eklipse
May 8, 2012	Ljubljana	Slovenia	Tivoli Hall	Battle Beast; Eklipse
June 2, 2012 (Note: The June 2, 2012, concert was a part of Ursynalia Festival.)	Warsaw	Poland	Warsaw University of Life Sciences	—N/a
June 8, 2012 (Note: The June 8, 2012, concert was a part of Download Festival.)	Leicestershire	England	Donington Park	—N/a
June 10, 2012 (Note: The June 10, 2012, concert was a part of Nova Rock Festival.)	Nickelsdorf	Austria	Pannonia Fields II	—N/a
June 15, 2012 (Note: The June 15, 2012, concert was a part of Provinssirock.)	Seinäjoki	Finland	Törnävä	—N/a
June 30, 2012 (Note: The June 30, 2012, concert was a part of Topfest.)	Letisko Piešťany	Slovakia	Piešťany Airport	—N/a
July 5, 2012 (Note: The July 5, 2012, concert was a part of Getaway Rock Festival.)	Gävle	Sweden	Gasklockorna	—N/a
July 7, 2012 (Note: The July 7, 2012, concert was a part of Ruisrock.)	Turku	Finland	Ruissalo	—N/a
July 12, 2012 (Note: The July 12, 2012, concert was a part of Montreux Jazz Festival.)	Montreux	Switzerland	Auditorium Stravinski	—N/a
July 14, 2012 (Note: The July 14, 2012, concert was a part of Masters of Rock.)	Vizovice	Czech Republic	Areál likérky R. Jelínek	—N/a
July 21, 2012 (Note: The July 21, 2012, concert was a part of Costa de Fuego Festival.)	Benicàssim	Spain	Recinto de festivales de Benicàssim	—N/a
July 28, 2012 (Note: The July 28, 2012, concert was a part of RockCock.)	Kuopio	Finland	Väinölänniemi	—N/a
August 5, 2012 (Note: The August 5, 2012, concert was a part of Foire Aux Vins.)	Colmar	France	Théâtre de Plein Air	—N/a
August 25, 2012	Trondheim	Norway	Borggården	Triosphere
September 12, 2012	Atlanta	United States	Center Stage	Kamelot
September 13, 2012	Atlanta	United States	Center Stage	Kamelot
September 15, 2012	New York City	United States	Beacon Theatre	Kamelot
September 16, 2012	Philadelphia	United States	Electric Factory	Kamelot
September 17, 2012	Worcester	United States	Palladium	Kamelot
September 19, 2012	Montreal	Canada	Cepsum Arena	Kamelot
September 20, 2012	Toronto	Canada	Sound Academy	Kamelot
September 21, 2012	Columbus	United States	Newport Hall	Kamelot
September 23, 2012	Royal Oak	United States	Music Theatre	Kamelot
September 24, 2012	Chicago	United States	Congress Theater	Kamelot
September 25, 2012	Sauget	United States	Pop's Club	Kamelot
September 27, 2012	Kansas City	United States	Beaumont Club	Kamelot
September 28, 2012	Denver	United States	Ogden Theatre	Kamelot
September 29, 2012	Salt Lake City	United States	Complex Hall	Kamelot
October 1, 2012	Seattle	United States	The Showbox	Kamelot
October 2, 2012	Portland	United States	Crystal Ballroom	Kamelot
October 3, 2012	San Francisco	United States	Warfield Theatre	Kamelot
October 5, 2012	Anaheim	United States	City National Grove	Kamelot
October 6, 2012	San Diego	United States	House of Blues	Kamelot
October 7, 2012	Phoenix	United States	Marquee Theatre	Kamelot
October 9, 2012	Oklahoma City	United States	Diamond Ballroom	Kamelot
October 10, 2012	Austin	United States	Emo's Club	Kamelot
October 11, 2012	New Orleans	United States	House of Blues	Kamelot
October 13, 2012	Fort Lauderdale	United States	Revolution Club	Kamelot
October 14, 2012	Lake Buena Vista	United States	House of Blues	Kamelot
November 4, 2012	Manchester	England	Apollo Theatre	Pain
November 5, 2012	London	England	Brixton Academy	Pain
November 6, 2012	Birmingham	England	O_{2} Birmingham	Pain
November 7, 2012	Glasgow	Scotland	O_{2} Glasgow	Pain
November 10, 2012	Helsinki	Finland	Hartwall Areena	—N/a
November 28, 2012	Mexico City	Mexico	Teatro Metropolitan	—N/a
November 29, 2012	Mexico City	Mexico	Teatro Metropolitan	—N/a
December 1, 2012	San Juan	Puerto Rico	Anfiteatro Tito Puente	Ortiz
December 3, 2012	San José	Costa Rica	Peppers Klubi	—N/a
December 5, 2012	Lima	Peru	Plaza San Miguel	—N/a
December 9, 2012	Porto Alegre	Brazil	Clube Opinião	Save Our Souls
December 10, 2012	Rio de Janeiro	Brazil	Circo Voador	Tierramystica
December 12, 2012	São Paulo	Brazil	Credicard Hall	Tierramystica
December 14, 2012	Buenos Aires	Argentina	Teatro Flores	Abrasantia
December 15, 2012	Buenos Aires	Argentina	Teatro Flores	Abrasantia

List of 2013 concerts, showing date, city, country, venue and support act(s)
Date	City	Country	Venue	Support Act(s)
January 4, 2013	Brisbane	Australia	Arena	Eyefear
January 8, 2013	Auckland	New Zealand	Studio Club	Naquadah
January 11, 2013	Sydney	Australia	Enmore Theatre	Sabaton
January 14, 2013	Melbourne	Australia	Palace Theatre	Sabaton
January 15, 2013	Melbourne	Australia	Palace Theatre	Sabaton
January 18, 2013	Adelaide	Australia	HQ Complex	Black Majesty
January 20, 2013	Perth	Australia	Metropolis Fremantle	Black Majesty
May 21, 2013	Osaka	Japan	Namba Hatch	—N/a
May 23, 2013	Nagoya	Japan	Diamond Hall	—N/a
May 24, 2013	Tokyo	Japan	Ebisu Liquid Club	—N/a
May 25, 2013	Tokyo	Japan	Studio Coast	Liv Moon
June 8, 2013 (Note: The June 8, 2013, concert was a part of Sauna Open Air.)	Tampere	Finland	Ratinan Stadion	—N/a
June 15, 2013 (Note: The June 15, 2013, concert was a part of Greenfield Festival.)	Interlaken	Switzerland	Interlaken Air Base	—N/a
June 30, 2013 (Note: The June 30, 2013, concert was a part of Tuska Open Air.)	Helsinki	Finland	Suvilahti	—N/a
July 4, 2013 (Note: The July 4, 2013, concert was a part of Byblos International Festival.)	Byblos	Lebanon	Byblos Castle	—N/a
July 11, 2013 (Note: The July 11, 2013, concert was a part of Midnattsrocken.)	Lakselv	Norway	Brennelvneset	—N/a
July 13, 2013 (Note: The July 13, 2013, concert was a part of Ilosaarirock.)	Joensuu	Finland	Laulurinne	—N/a
July 20, 2013 (Note: The July 20, 2013, concert was a part of Sotkamon Syke.)	Vuokatti	Finland	Sokos Hotel	—N/a
July 27, 2013 (Note: The July 27, 2013, concert was a part of Benátská Noc.)	Liberec	Czech Republic	Areál Vesec	—N/a
August 3, 2013 (Note: The August 3, 2013, concert was a part of Wacken Open Air.)	Wacken	Germany	Hauptstrasse	—N/a
August 10, 2013 (Note: The August 10, 2013, concert was a part of Alcatraz Festival.)	Kortrijk	Belgium	Festivalterrein Katho	—N/a
August 11, 2013 (Note: The August 11, 2013, concert was a part of M'era Luna Festival.)	Hildesheim	Germany	Flugplatz Hildesheim-Drispenstedt	—N/a

== Personnel ==
Nightwish

- Anette Olzon – lead vocals (until 29 September 2012)
- Tuomas Holopainen – keyboards
- Emppu Vuorinen – guitars
- Jukka Nevalainen – drums
- Marko Hietala – bass, male vocals

Additional musicians

- Troy Donockley – Uilleann pipes, tin whistle, additional vocals
- Elize Ryd* – female vocals
- Alissa White-Gluz* – female vocals
- Floor Jansen – lead vocals (from 1 October 2012 onwards)

* filled in as vocalist during the September 28, 2012 show in Denver, Colorado while Anette Olzon was hospitalized due to illness.
