= Endless Forms Most Beautiful World Tour =

2015–2016 concert tour by Nightwish

- Tour by Nightwish
- Promotional poster for the Latin American tour in September–October 2015
- Location: Asia; Europe; North America; Oceania; South America
- Associated album: Endless Forms Most Beautiful
- Start date: April 9, 2015
- End date: October 9, 2016
- Legs: 12
- No. of shows: 151

Nightwish concert chronology
- Imaginaerum World Tour (2012–2013); Endless Forms Most Beautiful World Tour (2015–2016); Decades: World Tour (2018)

The Endless Forms Most Beautiful World Tour was a concert tour by the Finnish symphonic metal band Nightwish, in support of their eighth studio album, Endless Forms Most Beautiful.

It was the first full tour featuring lead singer Floor Jansen, who replaced Anette Olzon in late 2012, and it was the first tour featuring drummer Kai Hahto, who replaced Jukka Nevalainen on hiatus due to health issues.

== Background ==
The band toured United States and Canada from April to May 2015 and in June started a series of festivals appearances across Europe, including two headlining shows in Finland; In September, the band took part in the traditional Rock in Rio festival in Brazil, also with additional dates for Latin America, and then toured European arenas from October to November, ending the leg at the famous Wembley Arena in London. In 2016, the band toured Australia in January, embarked on another North American tour in February and March, followed by Asia in April, and a small tour in Russia and Ukraine before setting off for another series of festivals.

Both concerts in Tampere Stadium and Wembley Arena were recorded for a live DVD called Vehicle of Spirit which was released on December 16, 2016.

On August 20, 2016, at the Himos Park show, original Nightwish bassist Sami Vänskä joined the band on stage to play "Stargazers" with them on bass while Marko joined the crowd. Jukka Nevalainen was also a guest, filling in for Kai Hahto for drums to play "Last Ride of the Day".

The band made their first appearance back in South Korea since the Wishmaster World Tour fifteen years ago.

== Reception ==
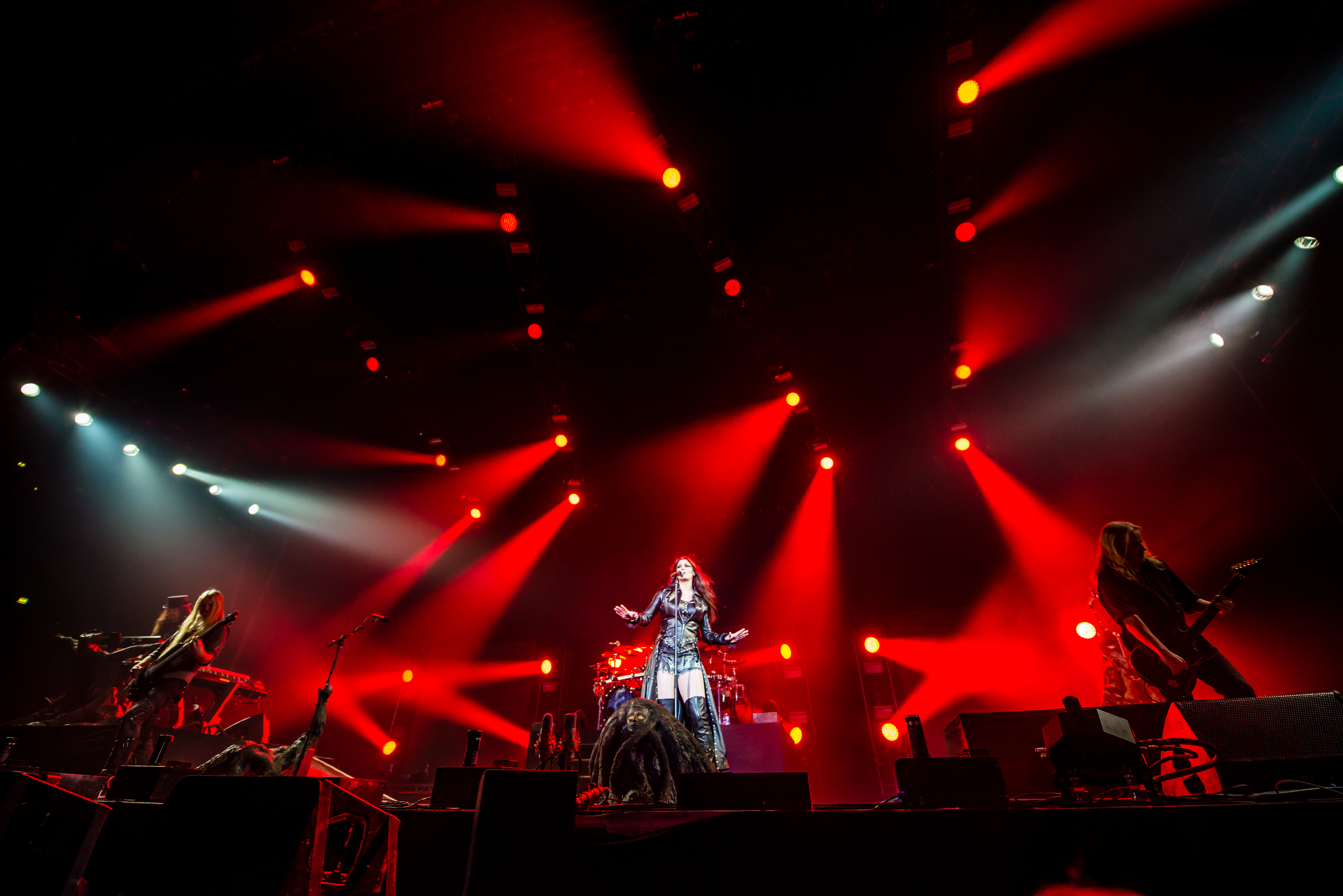
Nightwish performing in Oberhausen in 2015.

Samantha Wu from V13, gave the Toronto performance a positive review. She praised Floor Jansen's vocals and her presence on stage, citing that she "is a thrill to watch". She also praised the inclusion of old songs like "Stargazers" being added to the setlist which have not been performed in a long while, as well as the spotlight shining moment with Marko Hietala's performance of "The Islander". Samantha concluded her review by stating that that Floor was the perfect fit for the band in which she hopes she will be with the band for a long time, as well as stating their performance that night was 'simply outstanding'.

Anabel from RockRevolt Magazine who attended the Greek Theater performance in Los Angeles had given the show a positive review. In their review of the concert, they pointed out the nature and traveler themed imagery and props used for the stage, used in the adventurer theme of the album itself. The reviewer praised the strong setlist, referring to the energetic songs and beautiful ballads on the set. The reviewer cited Floor Jansen's vocals as awe-inspiring in which she had stolen the show for the use of her theatrical expressions. The reviewer concluded their review, stating that the encore songs were the "icing on the cake" finish for an amazing show.

Dan Shutt, a reporter from The Independent, who had attended the sold out Wembley performance, noted on the energy and excitement of the show as a spectacle, sticking to the formula with pyrotechnics and visual effects playing throughout the biggest songs. However, he criticized the lack of personalisation which was outweighed by Floor's vocals.

== Set list ==
The following set list was performed at the first show of the tour at Hammerstein Ballroom, and is not intended to represent all of the shows on tour.

1. "The Greatest Show on Earth "Chapter V: Sea-Worn Driftwood"" (intro)
2. "Shudder Before the Beautiful"
3. "Yours Is an Empty Hope"
4. "Amaranth"
5. "She Is My Sin"
6. "Endless Forms Most Beautiful"
7. "My Walden"
8. "The Islander"
9. "Élan"
10. "Weak Fantasy"
11. "Storytime"
12. "Nemo"
13. "I Want My Tears Back"
14. "Stargazers"
15. "Sleeping Sun"
16. "The Greatest Show on Earth (Chapter II and III)"
  Encore
17. "Ghost Love Score"
18. "Last Ride of the Day"

== Tour dates ==
List of 2015 concerts, showing date, city, country, venue and support acts
Date	City	Country	Venue	Support Act(s)
April 9, 2015	New York City	United States	Hammerstein Ballroom	Sabaton; Delain
April 10, 2015	Philadelphia	United States	Electric Factory	Sabaton; Delain
April 11, 2015	Worcester	United States	Palladium	Sabaton; Delain
April 13, 2015	Quebec City	Canada	Le Capitole	Sabaton; Delain
April 14, 2015	Toronto	Canada	Phoenix Concert Theatre	Sabaton; Delain
April 16, 2015	Buffalo	United States	Town Ballroom	Sabaton; Delain
April 17, 2015	Cleveland	United States	Agora Theatre	Sabaton; Delain
April 18, 2015	Chicago	United States	Concorde Music Hall	Sabaton; Delain
April 19, 2015	Clive	United States	7 Flags Center	Sabaton; Delain
April 21, 2015	Denver	United States	Ogden Theatre	Sabaton; Delain
April 22, 2015	Salt Lake City	United States	In the Venue	Sabaton; Delain
April 24, 2015	Spokane	United States	Knitting Factory	Sabaton; Delain
April 25, 2015	Vancouver	Canada	Orpheum Theatre	Sabaton; Delain
April 26, 2015	Portland	United States	Crystal Ballroom	Sabaton; Delain
April 28, 2015	San Francisco	United States	Warfield Theatre	Sabaton; Delain
April 30, 2015	Las Vegas	United States	House of Blues	Sabaton; Delain
May 1, 2015	Los Angeles	United States	Greek Theatre	Sabaton; Delain
May 2, 2015	Tempe	United States	Marquee Theatre	Sabaton; Delain
May 3, 2015	El Paso	United States	Tricky Falls Club	Sabaton; Delain
May 5, 2015	Dallas	United States	The Bomb Factory	Sabaton; Delain
May 6, 2015	Houston	United States	Warehouse Live	Sabaton; Delain
May 8, 2015	Orlando	United States	House of Blues	Sabaton; Delain
May 9, 2015	Fort Lauderdale	United States	Revolution Club	Sabaton; Delain
May 11, 2015	Nashville	United States	Marathon Music Works	Sabaton; Delain
May 12, 2015	Louisville	United States	Expo 5	Sabaton; Delain
May 13, 2015	Charlotte	United States	The Fillmore Charlotte	Sabaton; Delain
May 14, 2015	Silver Spring	United States	The Fillmore Silver Spring	Sabaton; Delain
June 6, 2015	Joensuu	Finland	Laulurinne	Children of Bodom; Insomnium; Sonata Arctica
June 8, 2015	Turku	Finland	MS Baltic Princess	Children of Bodom; Insomnium; Sonata Arctica
June 9, 2015	Turku	Finland	MS Baltic Princess	Children of Bodom; Insomnium; Sonata Arctica
June 13, 2015 (Note: The June 13, 2015, concert was a part of Nova Rock Festival.)	Nickelsdorf	Austria	Pannonia Fields II	—
June 14, 2015	Banská Bystrica	Slovakia	Amfiteáter	—
June 19, 2015 (Note: The June 19, 2015, concert was a part of Rock the Ring.)	Hinwil	Switzerland	Autobahnkreisel	—
June 21, 2015 (Note: The June 21, 2015, concert was a part of Hellfest.)	Clisson	France	Val de Moine	—
July 12, 2015 (Note: The July 12, 2015, concert was a part of Masters of Rock.)	Vizovice	Czech Republic	Areál likérky R. Jelíne	—
July 15, 2015 (Note: The July 15, 2015, concert was a part of Kingdom of Hegyalja Festival.)	Budapest	Hungary	Petőfi Csarnok	—
July 23, 2015 (Note: The July 23, 2015, concert was a part of Barcelona Rock Fest.)	Barcelona	Spain	Parc de Can Zam	—
July 25, 2015 (Note: The July 25, 2015, concert was a part of Qstock.)	Oulu	Finland	Kuusisaari	—
July 31, 2015	Tampere	Finland	Tampere Stadium	Sonata Arctica; Children of Bodom
August 8, 2015 (Note: The August 8, 2015, concert was a part of Alcatraz Festival.)	Kortrijk	Belgium	Sport Campus Lange Munte	—
August 9, 2015 (Note: The August 9, 2015, concert was a part of M'era Luna Festival.)	Hildesheim	Germany	Flugplatz Hildesheim-Drispenstedt	—
August 15, 2015 (Note: The August 15, 2015, concert was a part of Summer Breeze Open Air.)	Dinkelsbühl	Germany	Flugplatz des Aeroclubs Dinkelsbühl	—
August 29, 2015	Trondheim	Norway	Sverresborg Arena	The Sirens
September 23, 2015	Fortaleza	Brazil	Anfiteatro Dragão do Mar	Jack the Joker
September 25, 2015 (Note: The September 25, 2015, concert was a part of Rock in Rio.)	Rio de Janeiro	Brazil	Cidade do Rock	—
September 26, 2015	São Paulo	Brazil	HSBC Hall	—
September 27, 2015	Curitiba	Brazil	Masters Hall	—
September 29, 2015	Porto Alegre	Brazil	Opinião Club	—
October 2, 2015	Buenos Aires	Argentina	Luna Park Stadium	Boudika
October 4, 2015	Santiago	Chile	Teatro Caupolicán	Caterina Nix
October 6, 2015	Lima	Peru	Estadio San Marcos	Delain
October 8, 2015	Quito	Ecuador	El Teleférico	Delain
October 10, 2015	Bogotá	Colombia	Teatro Royal Center	Delain
October 13, 2015	Monterrey	Mexico	Escena Arena	Delain
October 14, 2015	Mexico City	Mexico	Teatro Metropólitan	Delain
October 15, 2015	Mexico City	Mexico	Teatro Metropólitan	Delain
October 17, 2015	Guadalajara	Mexico	Teatro Diana	Delain
November 13, 2015	Espoo	Finland	Barona Areena	Beast in Black
November 15, 2015	Stockholm	Sweden	Arenan	Amorphis
November 16, 2015	Copenhagen	Denmark	Falconer Amphitheatre	Arch Enemy; Amorphis
November 18, 2015	Hamburg	Germany	Barclaycard Arena	Arch Enemy; Amorphis
November 19, 2015	Amsterdam	Netherlands	Heineken Music Hall	Arch Enemy; Amorphis
November 20, 2015	Amsterdam	Netherlands	Heineken Music Hall	Arch Enemy; Amorphis
November 21, 2015	Oberhausen	Germany	König Pilsener Arena	Arch Enemy; Amorphis
November 23, 2015	Lyon	France	Halle Tony Garnier	Arch Enemy; Amorphis
November 25, 2015	Paris	France	Bercy Arena	Arch Enemy; Amorphis
November 26, 2015	Toulouse	France	Le Zénith	Arch Enemy; Amorphis
November 28, 2015	Basel	Switzerland	St. Jakobshalle	Arch Enemy; Amorphis
November 29, 2015	Bologna	Italy	Unipol Arena	Arch Enemy; Amorphis
December 1, 2015	Munich	Germany	Le Zenith	Arch Enemy; Amorphis
December 3, 2015	Stuttgart	Germany	Schleyer-Halle	Arch Enemy; Amorphis
December 4, 2015	Frankfurt	Germany	Jahrhunderthalle	Arch Enemy; Amorphis
December 5, 2015	Nuremberg	Germany	Nuremberg Arena	Arch Enemy; Amorphis
December 7, 2015	Prague	Czech Republic	Tipsport Arena	Arch Enemy; Amorphis
December 8, 2015	Vienna	Austria	Wiener Stadthalle	Arch Enemy; Amorphis
December 10, 2015	Bucharest	Romania	Romexpo	Arch Enemy; Amorphis
December 12, 2015	Budapest	Hungary	Sports Arena	Arch Enemy; Amorphis
December 14, 2015	Leipzig	Germany	Leipzig Arena	Arch Enemy; Amorphis
December 15, 2015	Berlin	Germany	Max-Schmeling-Halle	Arch Enemy; Amorphis
December 16, 2015	Esch-sur-Alzette	Luxembourg	Rockhal	Arch Enemy; Amorphis
December 17, 2015	Antwerp	Belgium	Lotto Arena	Arch Enemy; Amorphis
December 19, 2015	London	England	Wembley Arena	Arch Enemy; Amorphis

List of 2016 concerts, showing date, city, country, venue and support act(s)
Date	City	Country	Venue	Support Act(s)
January 6, 2016	Brisbane	Australia	Tivoli Theatre	Taberah; Voyager
January 9, 2016	Sydney	Australia	Enmore Theatre	Taberah; Voyager
January 11, 2016	Melbourne	Australia	Forum Theatre	Taberah; Voyager
January 13, 2016	Adelaide	Australia	HQ Complex	Taberah; Voyager
January 15, 2016	Fremantle	Australia	King's Theatre	Taberah; Voyager
January 18, 2016	Singapore		Hard Rock Hotel	—
February 19, 2016	Sayreville	United States	Starland Ballroom	Sonata Arctica; Delain
February 20, 2016	Hartford	United States	Webster Theater	Sonata Arctica; Delain
February 21, 2016	Montreal	Canada	Metropolis Hall	Sonata Arctica; Delain
February 22, 2016	London	Canada	Music Hall	Sonata Arctica; Delain
February 24, 2016	Pittsburgh	United States	Carnegie Library of Homestead	Sonata Arctica; Delain
February 25, 2016	Columbus	United States	Lifestyle Communities Pavilion	Sonata Arctica; Delain
February 26, 2016	Royal Oak	United States	Music Theatre	Sonata Arctica; Delain
February 27, 2016	Milwaukee	United States	Rave Club	Sonata Arctica; Delain
February 29, 2016	Minneapolis	United States	First Avenue	Sonata Arctica; Delain
March 1, 2016	Winnipeg	Canada	Burton Cummings Theatre	Sonata Arctica; Delain
March 2, 2016	Saskatoon	Canada	O'Briens Events Centre	Sonata Arctica; Delain
March 3, 2016	Edmonton	Canada	Francis Winspear Centre	Sonata Arctica; Delain
March 5, 2016	Calgary	Canada	MacEwan Hall	Sonata Arctica; Delain
March 6, 2016	Missoula	United States	Wilma Theatre	Sonata Arctica; Delain
March 7, 2016	Seattle	United States	The Showbox	Sonata Arctica; Delain
March 10, 2016	Reno	United States	Cargo's Ballroom	Sonata Arctica; Delain
March 11, 2016	San Jose	United States	City National Civic	Sonata Arctica; Delain
March 12, 2016	Anaheim	United States	City National Grove	Sonata Arctica; Delain
March 14, 2016	Tucson	United States	Rialto Theatre	Sonata Arctica; Delain
March 15, 2016	Colorado Springs	United States	City Auditorium	Sonata Arctica; Delain
March 16, 2016	Kansas City	United States	Uptown Theater	Sonata Arctica; Delain
March 18, 2016	Oklahoma City	United States	Diamond Ballroom	Sonata Arctica; Delain
March 19, 2016	San Antonio	United States	Aztec Theatre	Sonata Arctica; Delain
March 20, 2016	New Orleans	United States	Civic Center	Sonata Arctica; Delain
March 21, 2016	Birmingham	United States	Iron Live	Sonata Arctica; Delain
March 23, 2016	Tampa	United States	Ritz Club	Sonata Arctica; Delain
April 12, 2016	Beijing	China	M. Zone Center	—
April 14, 2016	Shanghai	China	QSW Culture Center	—
April 16, 2016	Taipei	Taiwan	NTUT Auditorium	—
April 17, 2016	Hong Kong		Kitec Rotunda Centre	—
April 19, 2016	Tokyo	Japan	Ex Theater	—
April 21, 2016	Osaka	Japan	Big Cat Club	—
April 22, 2016	Tokyo	Japan	AgeHa Club	—
May 15, 2016	Yekaterinburg	Russia	DIVS Arena	—
May 18, 2016	Voronezh	Russia	Event Hall	—
May 20, 2016	Moscow	Russia	Crocus City Hall	—
May 22, 2016	Kyiv	Ukraine	Sports Palace	—
May 24, 2016	St. Petersburg	Russia	Yubileyny Sports Palace	—
May 27, 2016 (Note: The May 27, 2016, concert was a part of Rockavaria.)	Munich	Germany	Olympiastadion	—
May 28, 2016 (Note: The May 28, 2016, concert was a part of Rock im Revier.)	Dortmund	Germany	Westfalenhallen	—
June 1, 2016	Košice	Slovakia	Štadión Lokomotívy	Almanac
June 3, 2016 (Note: The June 3, 2016, concert was a part of Metalfest.)	Plzeň	Czech Republic	Amfiteátr Lochotín	—
June 5, 2016 (Note: The June 5, 2016, concert was a part of Rock in Vienna.)	Vienna	Austria	Donauinsel	—
June 8, 2016 (Note: The June 8, 2016, concert was a part of Rock in Roma.)	Rome	Italy	Capannelle Racecourse	—
June 10, 2016 (Note: The June 10, 2016, concert was a part of Greenfield Festival.)	Interlaken	Switzerland	Interlaken Air Base	—
June 12, 2016 (Note: The June 12, 2016, concert was a part of Download Festival.)	Leicestershire	England	Donington Park	—
June 18, 2016 (Note: The June 18, 2016, concert was a part of Graspop Metal Meeting.)	Dessel	Belgium	Boeretang	—
June 30, 2016 (Note: The June 30, 2016, concert was a part of Provinssirock.)	Seinäjoki	Finland	Törnävänsaari	—
July 2, 2016 (Note: The July 2, 2016, concert was a part of Bråvalla Festival.)	Norrköping	Sweden	Bråvalla Flygfottilj	—
August 6, 2016 (Note: The August 6, 2016, concert was a part of Heavy Montréal.)	Montreal	Canada	Jean-Drapeau Park	—
August 20, 2016	Jämsä	Finland	Himos Park	Arch Enemy; Delain; Sonata Arctica; Silentium
August 26, 2016 (Note: The August 26, 2016, concert was a part of Czad Festival.)	Straszęcin	Poland	Stadion	—
September 3, 2016 (Note: The September 3, 2016, concert was a part of Havířovské Slavnosti.)	Havířov	Czech Republic	Areál městské sportovní haly	—
September 8, 2016	Lisbon	Portugal	Coliseu dos Recreios	Kandia
September 10, 2016	Madrid	Spain	Barclaycard Center	Alquimia
September 12, 2016	Mantua	Italy	Palabam	Temperance
September 14, 2016	Sofia	Bulgaria	Arena Armeec	—
October 2, 2016	Seoul	South Korea	Samsung Blue Square	—
October 5, 2016	Shenzhen	China	A8 Live House	—
October 7, 2016	Shanghai	China	QSW Culture Center	—
October 9, 2016 (Note: The October 9, 2016, concert was a part of Loud Park Festival.)	Tokyo	Japan	Saitama Super Arena	—

Cancelled dates

Original Date	City	Country	Venue
March 8, 2016	Boise	United States	Knitting Factory Club

== Personnel ==
- Floor Jansen – female vocals
- Tuomas Holopainen – keyboards
- Emppu Vuorinen – guitars
- Kai Hahto – drums
- Marko Hietala – bass, male vocals
- Troy Donockley – Uilleann pipes, tin whistle, additional vocals, additional guitars

Additional musicians

- Tony Kakko – guest vocals on "The Islander" and "Last Ride of the Day" at Rock in Rio 2015
- Richard Dawkins – live narration on "The Greatest Show on Earth" at Wembley Arena
- Sami Vänskä – guest bassist on "Stargazers" at Himos Park
- Jukka Nevalainen – guest drummer on "Last Ride of the Day" at Himos Park

Tour production

- Basty Duellmann – tour manager
- Roger Smith – tour manager (North America, Asia)
- Ville Lipiäinen – camera director, editing (Vehicle of Spirit)
- Mikko Linnavuori – stage design, screen video content
- Eero Helle – stage production, design, special effects, lighting
- Markku Aalto – stage production, design, special effects, pyrotechnician
- Teemu Koivistoinen – assistant pyrotechnician
- Antti Toiviainen – guitar technician
- Ulrich Weitz – drum technician
- Kimmo Ahola – sound engineer
- Marja Brink – make-up, hairstylist for Jansen
- Enrico Karolczak – booking agent
- Konstantin Byleev – tour promoter (Russia, Ukraine)
- Aki Rönkkö – monitor engineer
- Andy Copping – booking (Download Festival)
- Ville Wahlroos – lighting
