= Imaginarium (disambiguation) =

An imaginarium is a type of place dedicated to imagination.

Imaginarium may also refer to:

- The Imaginarium Studios, a motion capture studio founded by Andy Serkis
- Imaginarium SA, a Spain-based toy company founded in 1992
- Imaginarium, a brand name of Toys "R" Us
- Imaginaerum, a 2011 Nightwish album (former name Imaginarium)
  - Imaginaerum (film), a film based upon the Nightwish album
- Imaginarium: Songs from the Neverhood, a 2004 soundtrack album
- Imaginarium, a 2002 album by Morifade

== See also ==
- The Imaginarium of Doctor Parnassus, a 2009 film
