= Human. :II: Nature. World Tour =

2021–23 concert tour by Nightwish

- Tour by Nightwish
- Promotional poster for the Latin American tour in October 2022
- Location: Asia; Europe; North America; South America
- Associated album: Human. :II: Nature.
- Start date: July 28, 2021
- End date: June 17, 2023
- Legs: 8
- No. of shows: 69

Nightwish concert chronology
- Decades: World Tour (2018); Human. :II: Nature. World Tour (2021–2023)

The Human. :II: Nature. World Tour was a concert tour by the Finnish symphonic metal band Nightwish, in support of their ninth studio album, Human. :II: Nature.

It was the first tour in which Kai Hahto is an official member of the band, following original drummer Jukka Nevalainen's departure on July 15, 2019, the first not to feature bassist Marko Hietala following his departure in January 2021, the first to feature bassist Jukka Koskinen as a session bassist who later joined the band in August 2022 during the tour, and the final tour to feature lead vocalist Floor Jansen as she left the band in October 2026.

At the conclusion of the tour, the band began their touring hiatus which is set to last between 'two to three years' following the release of the band's tenth studio album, Yesterwynde.

== Background ==
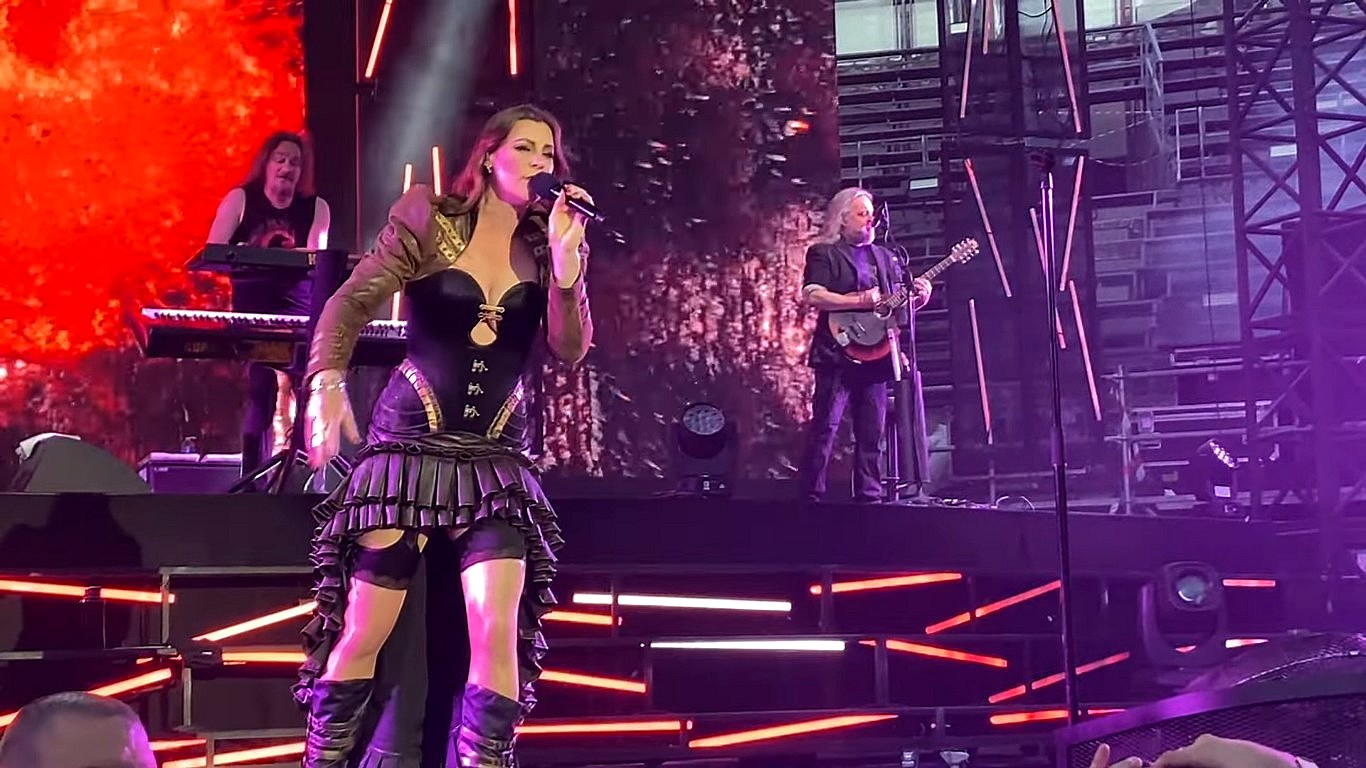
Jansen, Holopainen and Donockley during the Festival de Nîmes concert in July 2022

In promoting the tour and the album before its release, Troy Donockley and Floor Jansen were special guests on Planet Rock Radio, performing acoustic versions of "Nemo" and "How's the Heart?".

Following the postponement of the tour due to the COVID-19 pandemic, the band began the world tour on March 12, 2021 with an interactive livestream experience in a virtual reality built tavern which featured songs from the album on its setlist. The virtual livestream show was later postponed to May 2021. Upon the conclusion of the virtual performances, the shows had broken records with the first drawing 150,000 viewers and setting it as the most viewed virtual performance in Finland, with the box office exceeding one million in euros.

The band began the tour in Europe, South America, Asia and North America following the virtual performance, with their first show in Oulu played under the pseudonym "Nevski & the Prospects". The tour was originally scheduled to begin in spring 2020, but due to the pandemic, the band had postponed the tour. The European tour was postponed again to late 2021 on January 29, 2021, but had added a new date in Dublin, Ireland. The band returned to Hellfest in Clisson, France on July 25, 2022. Additional tour dates for North America were announced on October 12, 2021. European tour dates for November and December were later confirmed to go ahead for the band. Shows that were postponed in Europe that year were later rescheduled for the end of 2022. After the shows in Kitee and Vaasa in June 2023, the tour was concluded. Prior to the conclusion of the tour, the band issued a statement on April 6, 2023 that they would be going on a touring hiatus after the next studio album's release.

At the Oslo performance during their performance of "The Greatest Show on Earth", the band paid tribute to the late Alexi Laiho, a deceased member of the former Children of Bodom by displaying a picture of him on the video screen. The Pinkpop festival on June 17, 2022 had the band's set shortened, as Jansen had performed solo on the same day. During the Amsterdam show on November 27, 2022, Henk Poort joined on stage with Jansen to perform "The Phantom of the Opera", with the show being filmed for a future live release. Yannis Papadopoulos from Beast in Black later joined the band on stage at the Prague concert on December 21, 2022 to perform "Sahara".

Following Marko Hietala's departure from the band in January 2021, the band had announced in a statement that a temporary live member would fill in for bass. Before the first virtual performance that Jukka Koskinen was announced as the session bass player exclusively for the tour on May 28, 2021. However, the band later announced on August 21, 2022 that Jukka Koskinen would be the new permanent bass player in the band.

Shortly after the Latin American leg of the tour in October 2022, vocalist Floor Jansen underwent a successful breast cancer surgery. The band resumed its third European leg in November and December. It was then announced that Jansen's radiation therapy was moved from February to January 2023, resulting in the postponement of the band's Asian tour.

== Reception ==
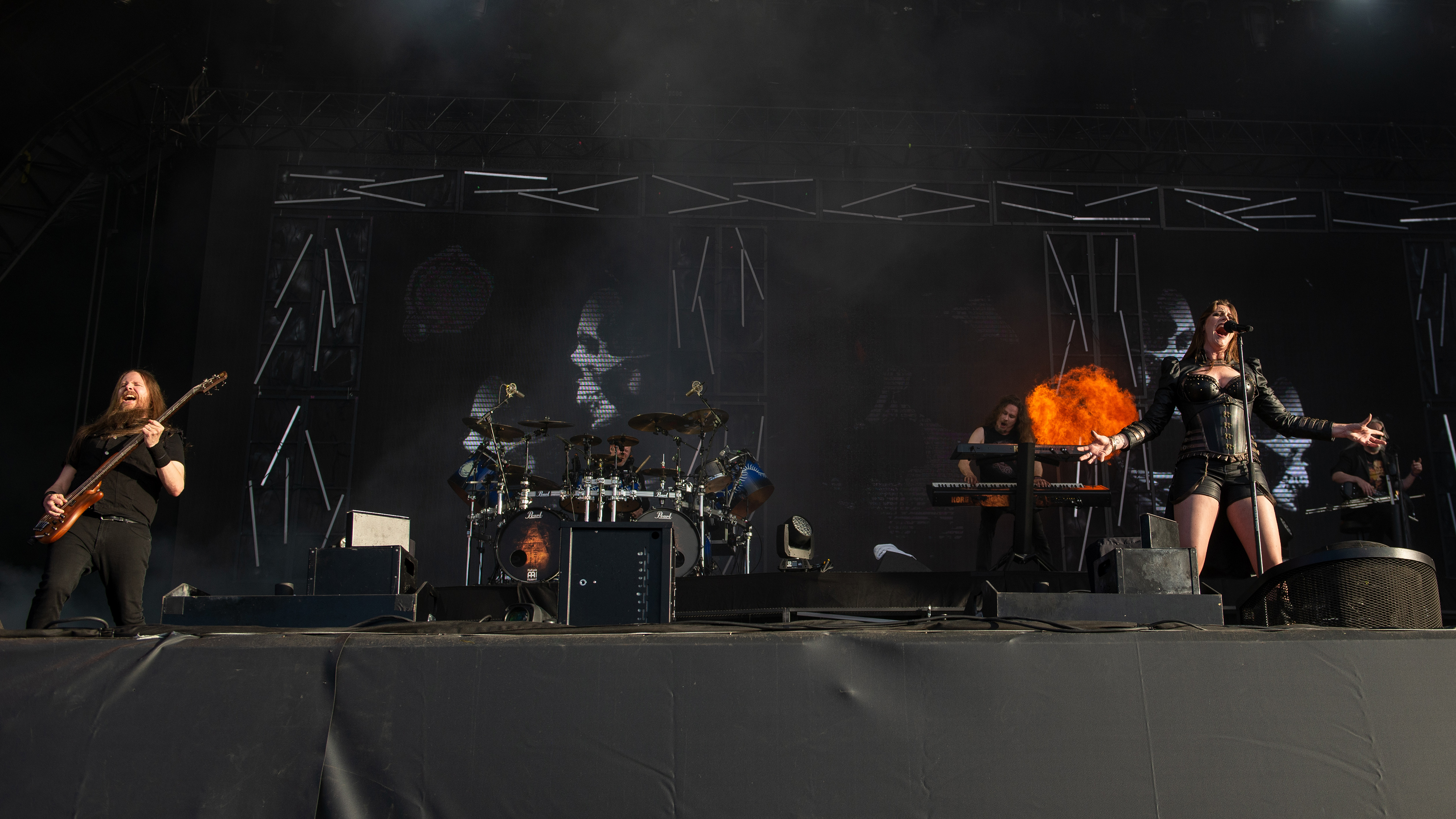
Nightwish performing at Hellfest, 2022.

Natasha Scharf, a reviewer from Louder Sound, had given the virtual performances a positive review. She stated: "Despite the technological limitations, Nightwish genuinely look like they're having the best time ever and there's no hint of the concerns Tuomas Holopainen had about their future. It's been two and a half years since their last live show and they've clearly missed the stage. Tonight's set is tight and packed with material from Human. :II: Nature., fan favourites and some surprising additions, including Harvest, Bless the Child, and a lovely acoustic rendition of How's the Heart? The intimate setting also captures friendly gestures that might have otherwise been missed; the band frequently exchange grins and nods, and Jansen even gives Koskinen a heartfelt thumbs-up during Ghost Love Score."

Norway Rock Magazine gave the Oslo performance at the Spektrum a positive review. Opening their review, they acknowledged the impressive stage production and setlist, they stated that the band didn't disappoint their fans which gave the band a rapturous reception. Praising Floor Jansen on her flawless performance and powerful vocals as well as being mastering at connecting with the audience, they also praised the chemistry and dynamic stage presence from all of the other members, which made it clear the band missed performing in front of an adoring audience. Concluding their review, they said the band know how to put on a superb live show, they finished their review stating that the show really was the 'Greatest Show on Earth'.

Samantha Wu from The Spill Magazine opened her review, noting on the anticipation of fans who were eager to hear the tracks from the band's new album live, knowing what to expect: soaring orchestral music with hard, ripping guitars and Floor Jansen's complex voice, which Wu acknowledged as "ground-breaking" despite the difficulty some of the songs were to sing. Having acknowledged the departure of former member Marko Hietala, she also mentioned the soft and melodic vocals of Troy Donockley - taking notes on how he paired it with Jansen's vocals during an acoustic version of "How's the Heart?". Wu concluded their review stating that the band delivered a whirlwind of an experience and that it was the best return to live music anyone could ask for.

== Set list ==
The following set list was performed at the warm-up show of the tour at Club Teatria, and is not intended to represent all of the shows on tour.

1. "Music" (intro tape)
2. "Noise"
3. "Planet Hell"
4. "Tribal"
5. "Élan"
6. "Storytime"
7. "How's the Heart?"
8. "Harvest"
9. "7 Days to the Wolves"
10. "Dark Chest of Wonders"
11. "I Want My Tears Back"
12. "Ever Dream"
13. "Nemo"
14. "Sleeping Sun"
15. "Shoemaker"
16. "Last Ride of the Day"
17. "Ghost Love Score"
18. "The Greatest Show on Earth (Chapters I, II and III)"
19. "Ad Astra" (outro tape; with Floor singing live)

== Tour dates ==
List of 2021 concerts, showing date, city, country, venue and support acts
Date	City	Country	Venue	Support act
July 28, 2021	Oulu	Finland	Club Teatria	Asim Searah
July 30, 2021 (Note: The concert on July 30, 2021 was a part of Qstock Festival.)	Oulu	Finland	Kuusisaari	—N/a
July 31, 2021 (Note: The concert on July 31, 2021 was a part of Kuopiorock.)	Kuopio	Finland	Väinölänniemi	—N/a
November 14, 2021	Oslo	Norway	Spektrum Arena	Sonata Arctica

List of 2022 concerts, showing date, city, country, venue and support acts
Date	City	Country	Venue	Support act
April 22, 2022	Tampere	Finland	Nokia Arena	Lähiöbotox
April 24, 2022	Helsinki	Finland	Ice Hall	Lähiöbotox
May 4, 2022	Toronto	Canada	History	Beast in Black
May 6, 2022	Montreal	Canada	M Telus	Beast in Black
May 7, 2022	Lowell	United States	Tsongas Center	Beast in Black
May 8, 2022	New York City	United States	Terminal 5	Beast in Black
May 10, 2022	Silver Spring	United States	The Fillmore	Beast in Black
May 12, 2022	Chicago	United States	Radius Center	Beast in Black
May 13, 2022	Saint Paul	United States	The Fillmore	Beast in Black
May 15, 2022	Denver	United States	Mission Ballroom	Beast in Black
May 18, 2022	San Francisco	United States	Warfield Theatre	Beast in Black
May 20, 2022	Los Angeles	United States	Wiltern Theatre	Beast in Black
May 21, 2022	Los Angeles	United States	Wiltern Theatre	Beast in Black
June 2, 2022 (Note: The concert on June 2, 2022 was a part of Rockfest.)	Hyvinkää	Finland	Hyvinkää Airfield	—N/a
June 9, 2022 (Note: The concert on June 9, 2022 was a part of Sweden Rock Festival.)	Sölvesborg	Sweden	Norje Havsbad	—N/a
June 17, 2022 (Note: The concert on June 17, 2022 was a part of Pinkpop.)	Landgraaf	Netherlands	Megaland	—N/a
June 25, 2022 (Note: The concert on June 25, 2022 was a part of Hellfest.)	Clisson	France	Val de Moine	—N/a
June 30, 2022 (Note: The concert on June 30, 2022 was a part of Barcelona Rockfest.)	Santa Coloma	Spain	Parc de Can Zam	—N/a
July 2, 2022 (Note: The concert on July 2, 2022 was a part of Festival de Nîmes.)	Nîmes	France	Arena of Nîmes	—N/a
July 10, 2022 (Note: The concert on July 10, 2022 was a part of Masters of Rock.)	Vizovice	Czech Republic	Areál Likérky Rudolf Jelínek	—N/a
July 15, 2022	Tallinn	Estonia	Pirita Klooster	—N/a
July 17, 2022 (Note: The concert on July 17, 2022 was a part of Ilosaarirock.)	Joensuu	Finland	Laulurinne	—N/a
July 23, 2022 (Note: The concert on July 23, 2022 was a part of Deichbrand Festival.)	Cuxhaven	Germany	Seeflughafen	—N/a
July 30, 2022 (Note: The concert on July 30, 2022 was a part of Fezen Festival.)	Székesfehérvár	Hungary	Új Váralja sor	—N/a
August 1, 2022	Bucharest	Romania	Romexpo	—N/a
August 12, 2022 (Note: The concert on August 12, 2022 was a part of Knotfest.)	Turku	Finland	Artukaisten kenttä	—N/a
October 13, 2022	Rio de Janeiro	Brazil	Vivo Rio	Beast in Black
October 14, 2022	São Paulo	Brazil	Espaço das Américas	Beast in Black
October 16, 2022	Buenos Aires	Argentina	Estadio Luna Park	Beast in Black
October 19, 2022	Santiago	Chile	Teatro Caupolicán	Beast in Black
October 22, 2022	Mexico City	Mexico	Palacio de los Deportes	Beast in Black
October 23, 2022	Guadalajara	Mexico	Teatro Diana	Beast in Black
November 20, 2022	Antwerp	Belgium	Lotto Arena	Turmion Kätilöt; Amorphis
November 21, 2022	London	England	Wembley Arena	Turmion Kätilöt; Amorphis
November 22, 2022	Birmingham	England	Resorts World Arena	Turmion Kätilöt; Amorphis
November 23, 2022	Dublin	Ireland	3Arena	Turmion Kätilöt; Amorphis
November 25, 2022	Berlin	Germany	Max-Schmeling-Halle	Turmion Kätilöt; Amorphis
November 27, 2022	Amsterdam	Netherlands	Ziggo Dome	Turmion Kätilöt; Amorphis
November 28, 2022	Amsterdam	Netherlands	Ziggo Dome	Turmion Kätilöt; Amorphis
November 30, 2022	Paris	France	AccorHotels Arena	Turmion Kätilöt; Amorphis
December 1, 2022	Düsseldorf	Germany	ISS Dome	Turmion Kätilöt; Amorphis
December 2, 2022	Esch-sur-Alzette	Luxembourg	Rockhal	Turmion Kätilöt; Amorphis
December 4, 2022	Vienna	Austria	Wiener Stadthalle	Turmion Kätilöt; Amorphis
December 5, 2022	Munich	Germany	Olympiahalle	Turmion Kätilöt; Amorphis
December 6, 2022	Milan	Italy	Fiera Milano	Turmion Kätilöt; Amorphis
December 9, 2022	Frankfurt	Germany	Festhalle	Turmion Kätilöt; Amorphis
December 10, 2022	Bamberg	Germany	Brose Arena	Turmion Kätilöt; Amorphis
December 12, 2022	Hamburg	Germany	Barclays Arena	Turmion Kätilöt; Amorphis
December 13, 2022	Leipzig	Germany	Arena Leipzig	Turmion Kätilöt; Amorphis
December 14, 2022	Gliwice	Poland	Gliwice Arena	Turmion Kätilöt; Amorphis
December 16, 2022	Zurich	Switzerland	Hallenstadion	Turmion Kätilöt; Amorphis
December 18, 2022	Stuttgart	Germany	Hanns-Martin-Schleyer-Halle	Turmion Kätilöt; Amorphis
December 20, 2022	Budapest	Hungary	Sports Arena	Turmion Kätilöt; Amorphis
December 21, 2022	Prague	Czech Republic	O2 Arena	Turmion Kätilöt; Amorphis

List of 2023 concerts, showing date, city, country, venue and support acts
Date	City	Country	Venue	Support act
January 31, 2023 (Note: The concerts on January 31 and February 2, 2023 were a part of 70000 Tons of Metal.)	Bimini	The Bahamas	MS Freedom of the Seas	—N/a
February 2, 2023	Bimini	The Bahamas	MS Freedom of the Seas	—N/a
March 25, 2023 (Note: The concerts on March 25 and 26, 2023 were a part of Loud Park.)	Osaka	Japan	Intex Osaka	—N/a
March 26, 2023	Tokyo	Japan	Makuhari Messe	—N/a
March 29, 2023	Quezon City	Philippines	SM Skydome	—N/a
March 31, 2023	Taipei	Taiwan	Zepp New Hall	—N/a
June 3, 2023	Stockholm	Sweden	Evenew Arena	—N/a
June 7, 2023 (Note: The concert on June 7, 2023 was a part of Release Athens Festival.)	Athens	Greece	Plateia Nerou	—N/a
June 10, 2023 (Note: The concert on June 10, 2023 was a part of Nova Rock Festival.)	Nickelsdorf	Austria	Pannonia Fields II	—N/a
June 12, 2023	Gelsenkirchen	Germany	Amphitheater	Hourglass
June 16, 2023	Kitee	Finland	Kiteen Rantakenttä	Silent Rain; Klamydia
June 17, 2023	Vaasa	Finland	Lemonsoft Stadion	Silent Rain; Klamydia

=== Cancelled dates ===
Date	City	Country	Venue	Reason
April 15, 2020	Guangzhou	China	Gym-ll	COVID-19 pandemic
April 17, 2020	Shanghai	China	Bandai Namco Base	COVID-19 pandemic
April 18, 2020	Shanghai	China	Bandai Namco Base	COVID-19 pandemic
May 2, 2020	Mexico City	Mexico	Domination Festival	COVID-19 pandemic
June 7, 2020	Tampere	Finland	Rockfest	COVID-19 pandemic
June 11, 2020	Krakow	Poland	Mystic Festival	COVID-19 pandemic
June 11–13, 2020	Interlaken	Switzerland	Greenfield Festival	COVID-19 pandemic
December 16, 2020	Cardiff	Wales	Motorpoint Arena	COVID-19 pandemic
August 14, 2021	Helsinki	Finland	Kaisaniemi Park	COVID-19 pandemic
November 9, 2022	Saint Petersburg	Russia	Yubileyny Sports Palace	2022 Russian invasion of Ukraine
November 10, 2022	Moscow	Russia	Crocus City Hall	2022 Russian invasion of Ukraine
November 12, 2022	Kyiv	Ukraine	Stereo Plaza	2022 Russian invasion of Ukraine
November 13, 2022	Minsk	Belarus	Falcon Club	2022 Russian invasion of Ukraine
January 3, 2023	Beijing	China	Exhibition Theater	Floor Jansen's radiation therapy following breast cancer surgery in October 2022
January 5, 2023	Shanghai	China	Bandai Namco Base	Floor Jansen's radiation therapy following breast cancer surgery in October 2022
January 6, 2023	Shanghai	China	Bandai Namco Base	Floor Jansen's radiation therapy following breast cancer surgery in October 2022
January 8, 2023	Guangzhou	China	Gym-ll	Floor Jansen's radiation therapy following breast cancer surgery in October 2022
January 11, 2023	Hong Kong	China	Star Hall	Floor Jansen's radiation therapy following breast cancer surgery in October 2022
January 15, 2023	Jakarta	Indonesia	Istora Gelora Bung Karno	Floor Jansen's radiation therapy following breast cancer surgery in October 2022
January 17, 2023	Sentosa	Singapore	Hard Rock Coliseum	Floor Jansen's radiation therapy following breast cancer surgery in October 2022
January 23, 2023	Seoul	South Korea	KBS Hall	Floor Jansen's radiation therapy following breast cancer surgery in October 2022
January 25, 2023	Osaka	Japan	Namba Hatch	Floor Jansen's radiation therapy following breast cancer surgery in October 2022
January 27, 2023	Tokyo	Japan	Ex Theater Roppongi	Floor Jansen's radiation therapy following breast cancer surgery in October 2022
January 28, 2023	Tokyo	Japan	Ex Theater Roppongi	Floor Jansen's radiation therapy following breast cancer surgery in October 2022
June 9, 2023	Berlin	Germany	Parkbühne Wuhlheide	Logistical issues
June 22, 2023	Oslo	Norway	Tons of Rock	Health issues

== Personnel ==
- Floor Jansen – lead vocals
- Tuomas Holopainen – keyboards
- Emppu Vuorinen – guitars
- Kai Hahto – drums, percussion
- Troy Donockley – uilleann pipes, tin whistle, bouzouki, male vocals, additional guitars
- Jukka Koskinen – bass

Guest musicians

- Henk Poort – guest vocals (Amsterdam, Europe 2022)
- Yannis Papadopoulos – guest vocals (Prague, Europe 2022)
