= Decades: Live in Buenos Aires =

Video by Nightwish
- Released: December 6, 2019
- Recorded: September 30, 2018
- Venue: Microestadio Malvinas Argentinas (Buenos Aires)
- Genres: Symphonic metal; power metal
- Length: 121:15
- Label: Nuclear Blast

Nightwish live album chronology
| Vehicle of Spirit (2017) | Decades: Live in Buenos Aires (2019) | The Greatest 30 Years on Earth (2026) |

Decades: Live in Buenos Aires is a video and audio release from the Finnish symphonic metal band Nightwish, which was recorded during the Latin American leg of the Decades: World Tour. It was released on December 6, 2019.

== Track listing ==
| No. | Title | Lyrics | Music | Originally from | Length |
|---|---|---|---|---|---|
| 1. | "Swanheart" | Instrumental | Tuomas Holopainen | Oceanborn (1998) | 2:49 |
| 2. | "End of All Hope" | Holopainen | Holopainen | Century Child (2002) | 4:00 |
| 3. | "Wish I Had an Angel" | Holopainen | Holopainen | Once (2004) | 4:19 |
| 4. | "10th Man Down" | Holopainen | Holopainen | Over the Hills and Far Away (2001) | 5:28 |
| 5. | "Come Cover Me" | Holopainen | Holopainen, Emppu Vuorinen | Wishmaster (2000) | 5:48 |
| 6. | "Gethsemane" | Holopainen | Holopainen | Oceanborn | 5:42 |
| 7. | "Élan" | Holopainen | Holopainen | Endless Forms Most Beautiful (2015) | 4:27 |
| 8. | "Sacrament of Wilderness" | Holopainen | Holopainen, Vuorinen | Oceanborn | 4:23 |
| 9. | "Deep Silent Complete" | Holopainen | Holopainen | Wishmaster | 4:19 |
| 10. | "Dead Boy's Poem" | Holopainen | Holopainen | Wishmaster | 6:50 |
| 11. | "Elvenjig" | Instrumental | Iona | | 2:50 |
| 12. | "Elvenpath" | Holopainen | Holopainen | Angels Fall First (1997) | 5:54 |
| 13. | "I Want My Tears Back" | Holopainen | Holopainen | Imaginaerum (2012) | 5:25 |
| 14. | "Amaranth" | Holopainen | Holopainen | Dark Passion Play (2007) | 4:41 |
| 15. | "The Carpenter" | Holopainen | Holopainen | Angels Fall First | 6:07 |
| 16. | "The Kinslayer" | Holopainen | Holopainen | Wishmaster | 4:17 |
| 17. | "Devil and the Deep Dark Ocean" | Holopainen | Holopainen | Oceanborn | 4:56 |
| 18. | "Nemo" | Holopainen | Holopainen | Once | 4:54 |
| 19. | "Slaying the Dreamer" | Holopainen | Holopainen, Vuorinen | Century Child | 5:12 |
| 20. | "The Greatest Show on Earth" | Holopainen | Holopainen, Hietala | Endless Forms Most Beautiful | 16:59 |
| 21. | "Ghost Love Score" | Holopainen | Holopainen | Once | 11:55 |

== Personnel ==
- Floor Jansen – female vocals
- Tuomas Holopainen – keyboards
- Emppu Vuorinen – guitars
- Kai Hahto – drums
- Marko Hietala – bass, male vocals
- Troy Donockley – Uilleann pipes, low whistles, bouzouki, additional vocals, additional guitars

=== Production ===
- Ville Lapeinen – director
- Mikka Jusilla – mastering
- Sami Jormanainen – engineer
- Samu Ruuskanen – vocal editing
- Marcelo Bonemi – camera
- Garcia Sanchez – camera
- Juan Ignacio – camera
- Pablo Federico – camera
- Maximiliano Sosa – camera
- Alejandro Fabrri – camera
- Edgardo Nuñez – camera
- Julian Munarriz – camera
- Federico Ariza – camera
- Nicolas D'Esposito – camera
- Masa Mason – camera
- Leonardo Chiarenza – visual production
- Guido Rodolfo Semoni, Matías Schverdfinger – producer assistant
- Timo Isoaho – photography
- Toxic Angel – artwork

== Charts ==
=== Album charts ===
| Chart (2019) | Peak position |
|---|---|
| Hungarian Albums (MAHASZ) | 36 |

=== Video charts ===
| Chart (2019) | Peak position |
|---|---|
| Finnish Music DVD Chart | 1 |
