= Vehicle of Spirit =

Video by Nightwish
- Released: December 16, 2016 (Europe) / January 6, 2017 (North America)
- Recorded: July 31, 2015 – March 23, 2016
- Length: 181:06
- Label: Nuclear Blast

Nightwish live album chronology
Showtime, Storytime (2013)	Vehicle of Spirit (2016)	Decades: Live in Buenos Aires (2019)

Vehicle of Spirit is a video and audio release from the Finnish symphonic metal band Nightwish. Two shows have been recorded during Endless Forms Most Beautiful World Tour; one at Tampere Stadium (July 31, 2015) and the other at Wembley Arena (December 19, 2015). Also, various songs were recorded around the world. It was released on December 16, 2016, in Europe and January 7, 2017, in North America.

== Track listing ==
The Wembley Show

No.	Title	Lyrics	Music	Length
1.	"Shudder Before the Beautiful"	Tuomas Holopainen	Holopainen	6:58
2.	"Yours Is an Empty Hope"	Marko Hietala · Holopainen	Holopainen · Hietala	5:47
3.	"Ever Dream"	Holopainen	Holopainen	5:10
4.	"Storytime"	Holopainen	Holopainen	4:52
5.	"My Walden"	Holopainen	Holopainen · Hietala	5:15
6.	"While Your Lips Are Still Red"	Holopainen	Holopainen · Hietala	5:05
7.	"Élan"	Holopainen	Holopainen	4:27
8.	"Weak Fantasy"	Hietala · Holopainen	Holopainen · Hietala	6:19
9.	"7 Days to the Wolves"	Holopainen	Hietala · Holopainen	7:16
10.	"Alpenglow"	Holopainen	Holopainen	4:56
11.	"The Poet and the Pendulum"	Holopainen	Holopainen	14:00
12.	"Nemo"	Holopainen	Holopainen	4:53
13.	"I Want My Tears Back"	Holopainen	Holopainen	7:13
14.	"Stargazers"	Holopainen	Holopainen	5:11
15.	"Ghost Love Score"	Holopainen	Holopainen	10:36
16.	"Last Ride of the Day"	Holopainen	Holopainen	4:58
17.	"The Greatest Show on Earth" (feat. Richard Dawkins)	Holopainen	Hietala · Holopainen	22:37

The Tampere Show

No.	Title	Lyrics	Music	Length
1.	"Shudder Before the Beautiful"	Holopainen	Holopainen	7:05
2.	"Yours Is an Empty Hope"	Hietala · Holopainen	Holopainen · Hietala	5:41
3.	"Amaranth"	Holopainen	Holopainen	4:24
4.	"She Is My Sin"	Holopainen	Holopainen	5:11
5.	"Dark Chest of Wonders"	Holopainen	Holopainen	4:36
6.	"My Walden"	Holopainen	Holopainen · Hietala	5:08
7.	"The Islander"	Holopainen	Hietala	5:55
8.	"Élan"	Holopainen	Holopainen	4:27
9.	"Weak Fantasy"	Hietala · Holopainen	Holopainen · Hietala	6:23
10.	"Storytime"	Holopainen	Holopainen	5:47
11.	"Endless Forms Most Beautiful"	Holopainen	Holopainen	5:10
12.	"Alpenglow"	Holopainen	Holopainen	5:03
13.	"Stargazers"	Holopainen	Holopainen	5:10
14.	"Sleeping Sun"	Holopainen	Holopainen	4:45
15.	"Ghost Love Score"	Holopainen	Holopainen	10:41
16.	"Last Ride of the Day"	Holopainen	Holopainen	4:54
17.	"The Greatest Show on Earth"	Holopainen	Holopainen · Hietala	20:55

Extras (Blu-Ray 2 + DVD 3)

No.	Title	Lyrics	Music	Recorded At	Length
1.	"Weak Fantasy"	Hietala · Holopainen	Holopainen · Hietala	Vancouver (Orpheum)	6:18
2.	"Nemo"	Holopainen	Holopainen	Buenos Aires (Luna Park Stadium)	4:30
3.	"The Poet and the Pendulum"	Holopainen	Holopainen	Mexico City (Teatro Metropólitan)	13:58
4.	"Yours Is an Empty Hope"	Hietala · Holopainen	Holopainen · Hietala	Joensuu (Laulurinne Autodrome)	5:57
5.	"7 Days to the Wolves"	Holopainen	Holopainen · Hietala	Espoo (Barona Areena)	7:19
6.	"Sleeping Sun"	Holopainen	Holopainen	Vizovice (Masters of Rock Festival)	4:36
7.	"Sahara"	Holopainen	Holopainen	Tampa (Ritz Club)	5:53
8.	"Edema Ruh" (Acoustic)	Holopainen	Holopainen	Turku (Baltic Princess Cruise)	5:47
9.	"Last Ride of the Day" (feat. Tony Kakko)	Holopainen	Holopainen	Rio de Janeiro (Rock in Rio)	4:50
10.	"Élan"	Holopainen	Holopainen	Sydney (Enmore Theatre)	4:19
11.	"Richard Dawkins (Interview from Wembley)"				7:31
12.	"Backstage documentary"				13:40

The Wembley Show - CD 1

No.	Title	Lyrics	Music	Length
1.	"Shudder Before the Beautiful"	Holopainen	Holopainen	6:34
2.	"Yours Is an Empty Hope"	Hietala · Holopainen	Holopainen · Hietala	5:47
3.	"Ever Dream"	Holopainen	Holopainen	5:11
4.	"Storytime"	Holopainen	Holopainen	6:09
5.	"My Walden"	Holopainen	Holopainen · Hietala	5:14
6.	"While Your Lips Are Still Red"	Holopainen	Holopainen · Hietala	4:39
7.	"Élan"	Holopainen	Holopainen	4:26
8.	"Weak Fantasy"	Hietala · Holopainen	Holopainen · Hietala	6:14
9.	"7 Days to the Wolves"	Holopainen	Hietala · Holopainen	7:12
10.	"Alpenglow"	Holopainen	Holopainen	4:56

The Wembley Show - CD 2

No.	Title	Lyrics	Music	Length
1.	"The Poet and the Pendulum"	Holopainen	Holopainen	14:02
2.	"Nemo"	Holopainen	Holopainen	4:37
3.	"I Want My Tears Back"	Holopainen	Holopainen	5:19
4.	"Stargazers"	Holopainen	Holopainen	4:31
5.	"Ghost Love Score"	Holopainen	Holopainen	10:40
6.	"Last Ride of the Day"	Holopainen	Holopainen	4:50
7.	"The Greatest Show on Earth"	Holopainen	Hietala · Holopainen	21:15

== Charts ==
Chart (2016)	Peak position
French Albums (SNEP)	168
German Albums (Offizielle Top 100)	14
