= The Crow, the Owl and the Dove =

Single by Nightwish

from the album Imaginaerum
- B-side: "The Heart Asks Pleasure First"
- Released: March 2, 2012
- Genre: Soft rock
- Length: 3:46 (radio edit); 4:08 (album version)
- Label: Scene Nation
- Composer: Marko Hietala
- Lyricist: Tuomas Holopainen
- Producer: Tuomas Holopainen

Nightwish singles chronology
"Storytime" (2011)	"The Crow, the Owl and the Dove" (2012)	"Élan" (2015)

Music videos
- Official fan video #1 on YouTube
- Official fan video #2 on YouTube
- Official fan video #3 on YouTube
- Official fan video #4 on YouTube
- Official fan video #5 on YouTube

"The Crow, the Owl and the Dove" is the second single from the Finnish symphonic metal band Nightwish's seventh studio album, Imaginaerum. It was released on March 2, 2012. The single includes the unreleased song "The Heart Asks Pleasure First", a cover of the song with the same name from the film The Piano, originally scored by Michael Nyman, to which Nightwish added vocals. The song was originally recorded in the Dark Passion Play sessions, but Nyman did not provide permission for the song to be released in time for album's release. The song debuted at number one in the Finnish Singles Chart.

== Fan Video Contest ==
On March 2, 2012, Nuclear Blast, Nightwish's record label, held a contest for fans to create their own music video for "The Crow, the Owl and the Dove." The record label provided a MP3 download of the radio edit of the song for entrants to use in entries. The first-place winner received a "Golden Ticket," allowing access to any show on the Imaginaerum World Tour, a special award, and a band meet-and-greet. The second and third-place winners received two tickets to a Nightwish concert near them (including a meet-and-greet for the second-place winner), as well as a copy of the Limited Tour Edition of Imaginaerum. Winning videos were uploaded to the Nuclear Blast and Nightwish YouTube channels. The contest ended April 10, 2012, and winners were selected by members of the band, label, and management, while taking YouTube "likes" and views into account. The winners were contacted by Nuclear Blast.

== Track listing ==
The Crow, the Owl and the Dove CDS (Digipak)
No.	Title	Writer(s)	Length
1.	"The Crow, the Owl and the Dove (Radio edit)"	Tuomas Holopainen, Marko Hietala	3:46
2.	"The Heart Asks Pleasure First"	Michael Nyman, Holopainen	4:20
3.	"The Crow, the Owl and the Dove (Album version)"	Holopainen, Hietala	4:10
4.	"The Crow, the Owl and the Dove (Instrumental version)"	Holopainen, Hietala	4:10
5.	"The Heart Asks Pleasure First (Instrumental version)"	Nyman, Holopainen	4:20

== Charts ==
Chart (2012)	Peak position
Finland (Suomen virallinen lista)	1

== See also ==
- List of number-one singles of 2012 (Finland)
