= Imaginarium =

Entertainment venue

An imaginarium (pl.: imaginaria) is a place devoted to the imagination. There are various types of imaginaria, centers largely devoted to stimulating and cultivating the imagination, towards scientific, artistic, commercial, recreational, or spiritual ends.

== Examples ==
- The Imaginarium Discovery Center is a children's science discovery center within the Anchorage Museum in Anchorage in the U.S. state of Alaska.
- The Imaginarium of South Texas is a children's museum and informal science center at Mall del Norte in Laredo, Texas.
- The Imaginarium Science Center is a science museum and aquarium in Fort Myers, Florida. It features science exhibits, a 3-D theatre, dinosaurs, aquarium displays, a touch tank with stingrays and more.
- The Bluedorn Science Imaginarium was a science center in Waterloo, Iowa that operated as part of the Grout Museum district from 1993 to 2025 when it closed, with plans to bring the exhibits back into the main building.
- The Imaginarium Science Centre of Devonport, Tasmania is a hands-on science museum that is part of Pandemonium: Discovery and Adventure Centre.
- Imaginarium, a discontinued toy brand, now brought back by Juguettos in Spain.

== In popular culture ==
- In The Imaginarium of Doctor Parnassus, the immortal mystic Doctor Parnassus runs a nomadic theater troupe who lure people through a mirror that shows them a world of their deepest subconscious desires, where their souls are put to the test.
