= Imaginaerum =

Studio album by Nightwish
- Released: 30 November 2011
- Recorded: October 2010 – April 2011
- Studios: Pajarin Hauta (Kitee); Legendary Bay of Tube (Kitee); Marco's CockPit (Kuopio); Röskö Campsite (Kitee); Petrax (Hollola); Finnvox (Helsinki); Angel (London)
- Genre: Symphonic metal
- Length: 74:26
- Languages: English; Finnish
- Labels: Scene Nation; Nuclear Blast; Roadrunner
- Producer: Tuomas Holopainen

Nightwish studio album chronology
Dark Passion Play (2007)	Imaginaerum (2011)	Endless Forms Most Beautiful (2015)

Singles from Imaginaerum
- 1. "Storytime" Released: 9 November 2011; 2. "The Crow, the Owl and the Dove" Released: 2 March 2012

Imaginaerum is the seventh studio album by the Finnish symphonic metal band Nightwish. It was released on 30 November 2011 by Scene Nation Oy and Sony Music in Finland, then on 2 December in Nuclear Blast in the rest of Europe and Roadrunner Records worldwide. According to Nightwish songwriter Tuomas Holopainen, the album is a concept album that tells the story of an old composer who is reminiscing of his youth on his deathbed. The album was produced alongside the movie of the same name, directed by Stobe Harju, who previously directed Nightwish's "The Islander" music video, and the album and the film share the same themes and general story. It is their second and last album with vocalist Anette Olzon, as well as the last with drummer Jukka Nevalainen. (Note: Nevalainen was still credited as the drummer on the next album, 2015's Endless Forms Most Beautiful.)

The first single off the album, "Storytime", was released on 9 November 2011 and quickly topped the Finnish single charts. According to Iltasanomat, Imaginaerum sold more than 50,000 copies in Finland on its first day of release. It has been described as Nightwish's best album by Sonic Seducer and was chosen as the album of the month by Dutch metal magazine Aardschok Magazine.

== Background ==
While rumours of the next Nightwish album had been circulating for a while, the album was confirmed in the June 2009 edition of the Finnish magazine Soundi, when lead composer and keyboardist Tuomas Holopainen stated that he had started work on a new album. In October 2009, rumours about the new album were circulated, suggesting that the title would be Wind Embraced. Lead vocalist Anette Olzon dismissed the rumours as false and stated that the songs for the new album had not yet been completed, with the exception of three songs written before May 2009. Holopainen said in a 2009 interview that "[...]I can't reveal to you anymore but there is going to be a big twist so to say, on the next album." In an interview with uilleann pipist Troy Donockley (who recorded with the band on Dark Passion Play), when asked about his involvement in the new album, he stated "Oh, yes, I will be playing on the next album and, from what Tuomas has told me, it is going to be something extraordinary..."

In early 2010, Olzon reported that the album was half-written, and that fans should not expect anything earlier than fall 2011. In April 2010, Holopainen revealed that he had then finished writing songs for the album, and in June, he had finished recording the pre-production demo. Throughout summer 2010, the band gathered to rehearse songs in the Finnish village of Sävi, and recording of the album started in October 2010 and ended in May 2011, while the finished album stood ready on June 4.

The band announced in late 2010 that more information about the album's content would be released in late January 2011, but on February 1, the official website bore a statement written by Holopainen that there would be a delay in the information being released due to schedule changes. He added, however, that "it still is the Burton-Gaiman-Dalí amusement park we are about to enter." In the same statement, it was also revealed that the album would be themed, and that "mood changes seem to be more present than ever before". The orchestration demos he had received from Pip Williams were described as "beautiful, twisted, tribal and cinematic stuff". In the Finnish version of the statement, it was also revealed that a few songs would not be getting any orchestration at all, differing from their latest album, on which all songs had a major orchestral presence.

On 10 February 2011 Nightwish announced on their website that the new album title would be Imaginarium. They also revealed that the band had been preparing a movie based on the album, which would be released in 2012 and directed by Stobe Harju, who previously directed the music video for "The Islander". According to Tuomas, the name was meant to be related to "the power of imagination and the roller coaster of life". At first he thought of Imagine, but that would be too obvious and similar to John Lennon's song, so he changed it to Imaginarium.

On February 23, three interviews were released on the website - one each with composer Tuomas Holopainen, director Stobe Harju, and producer Markus Selin. Holopainen revealed the origin of the project, and that Nightwish will appear as themselves in the film, with minor roles. On August 31, the band announced that the album and movie had changed name from Imaginarium to Imaginaerum, to avoid mix-ups with other things entitled "Imaginarium". This also led to changing the title of the track with the same name, but the song "Storytime" still includes the word "imaginarium" in the lyrics.

In early September, it was announced that the first single from the album would be "Storytime". A week later, the band released the Imaginaerum cover, track list and commentary on each song written by Holopainen. "Storytime" was released as a CD, download and as a video through YouTube on November 9, and after a mere week the band announced that the single was topping the Finnish single chart, as well as having high positions in Hungary and Great Britain. On November 18, Amazon released 30-second samples from every song off the album, and the band shortly announced on their website that Amazon had done so without their knowledge, and that they recommended that one shouldn't listen to them, if one "want(ed) to experience the true impact of the album".

On November 23, the Finnish Disney comics magazine, Aku Ankka, collaborated with the band in a pre-listening of the song "The Crow, the Owl and the Dove", which was released on Aku Ankka's website and required a code that was given in that week's issue of the magazine. Within hours, unlicensed copies of the song were available on YouTube and various torrent sites. Nightwish confirmed on January 11 that this will be the second single of the album.

== Production ==
The planning phase of the album started in the beginning of 2008, while Holopainen was on the Dark Passion Play World Tour (October 2007 - September 2009). In May 2009 he had the concept clear, as well as three or so finished songs. In March 2010, Holopainen finished writing the music for the last song, while some lyrics still were unfinished, and on June 2, the pre-production demo had been recorded. In the summer of 2010, the band (except for singer Anette Olzon, who was pregnant at the time) gathered for rehearsal in the Finnish village of Sävi. Olzon would later join the band on September 6 to rehearse and record her vocal demos.

At this time, there were twelve songs planned for the album. The last one, the title track, was later decided to be cut into two separate songs, "Song of Myself" and "Imaginaerum". Holopainen has described the situation as similar to the song "The Poet and the Pendulum" on Dark Passion Play, and its final part "Mother and Father", which was also discussed to be cut into another song, but decided to be kept as a single track.

The first proper recording for the album was drums, which Jukka Nevalainen started recording in October 2010. On October 20, all drum recordings were finished, whereas Emppu Vuorinen started recording the guitar tracks. Around New Year, Vuorinen had finished all comp tracks and about half of the leads to the album, planning to record acoustic and solo sections after the orchestral and choir sessions in February. At the same time, Marko Hietala had finished all his bass recordings throughout December.

In February 2011, the orchestral and choir parts were rehearsed and recorded in Angel Recording Studios in London. Most players of the 53-piece orchestra had already worked with the band on the previous albums Once (2004) and Dark Passion Play (2007), including the orchestral arranger Pip Williams. One difference from earlier orchestra recordings were the decision to record all rhythmic instruments separate from the rest of the orchestra, making it easier for the mixing process. Around this time, the decision had been made to divide the title track into the two separate "Song of Myself" and "Imaginarium", and the orchestra and choir recorded 13 songs, not 12 as had originally been planned. It was also around this time that the band had settled on an album name - Imaginarium, which later changed its spelling to Imaginaerum.

Anette Olzon's vocal recordings were originally planned for 7 March 2011 but plans changed when she fell in her home a few days before and broke her rib, and the date was changed to early April. Male vocalist (and bassist) Marko Hietala was instead called in to record his parts early, so to not waste the booked studio time, but before being able to start recording, Hietala as well slipped and hurt his rib, and had to hold several days before starting the recording. At the same time, recording engineer Mikko Karmila was home sick, and the day after Hietala had slipped, the other recording engineer Tero Kinnunen was run over by a horse and cart. Holopainen would later refer to this as "the Curse of the Mummy".

Towards the end of March, according to Hietala, "the mummy's curse [...] seems to have lifted a bit". He had by this time finished all but one male vocal tracks, and Holopainen had finished all his keyboard, piano and hammond parts, alongside a great portion of soundscapes. Through the end of March and the beginning of April, the band recorded "final touches" for the album while waiting for Olzon to get well enough to record her parts. This included some additional percussion and tribal drums, as well as the guest recordings of Troy Donockley and Pekka Kuusisto. By April 9, Olzon had still not recovered completely, but she was well enough for it not to affect her singing, and by mid-April all her vocals were finished.

On 4 June 2011 the crew had finalized the album, and Holopainen listened through it from start to finish. He wrote of it:

It's the same old story—the same feeling of bottomless emptiness that has marked the completion of all previous albums. We could have honed the songs till Armageddon, but at some point you just have to let go and start admiring the scenery.

== Concept and storyline ==
=== Connections between the film and the album ===
The album is produced alongside the film with the same name, directed by Stobe Harju and described as an "emotional fantasy-adventure", and feature the same basic themes and ideas, though told in more detail and with more extensive characters in the film than in the album. According to Holopainen, the film has evolved radically from the original plan, while still retaining the main spirit of the foundation. To Holopainen, it "was important from the very beginning that the album would work as its own individual piece of art" that would "work on its own without the film". According to drummer Jukka Nevalainen, "this is not a concept album per se", but it's "a coherent package from the beginning to the end".

The foundations to the music were developed before the pre-production of the film, during which Holopainen and Harju collaborated in developing the characters and the script.

== Musical and lyrical content ==
The album has been described as following a natural development from Dark Passion Play, inspired greatly by film scores. Like Dark Passion Play as well as Once and Century Child it features a live orchestra, again orchestrated by Pip Williams. The orchestrations have been described as "beautiful, twisted, tribal and cinematic", but will not be featured on every track as it was on Dark Passion Play. Bassist Marko Hietala has emphasized that the album is heavier than the predecessor. Imaginaerum is the first Nightwish album since their debut that features no music written by the guitarist Emppu Vuorinen. The reason for this, according to Vuorinen, is that after the long and exhausting touring for Dark Passion Play, he had no interest in touching his instrument for months.

Holopainen has cited three major influences on the album — film director Tim Burton, author Neil Gaiman and painter Salvador Dalí. Musical influences include Hans Zimmer, Danny Elfman, Ennio Morricone, Christy Moore, Van Halen and Pantera, and one song especially - "Rest Calm" - is inspired by death/doom giants Paradise Lost and My Dying Bride. Holopainen has called one song the "epic song of the album", "Song of Myself", which is almost as long as Dark Passion Play's "The Poet and the Pendulum" at 13 minutes. It is divided into four parts and especially influenced by poet Walt Whitman. One acoustic piece is also called "a Moominvalley Christmas Carol". One song, referenced to as "the Nukkumatti song" (nukkumatti being Finnish for sandman) is described as "a pounding, twisted and chorusless ghost train ride is sure to bring a smile to your face. At least it has done so to everyone who has heard it. Danny Elfman goes humppa", and another is described as "something completely different from anything we've ever done. All of us need to find new ways to play our instruments and use vocals for that piece. A terrifically challenging and mind-expanding song."

=== Track by track ===
"Taikatalvi" is Nightwish's first real intro song, and one of few Nightwish songs performed entirely in Finnish (alongside "Kuolema Tekee Taiteilijan" from Once, "Erämaan viimeinen" from Dark Passion Play and "Lappi (Lapland)" from Angels Fall First). The song also introduces the "snow flake theme" of the album and movie, as the Finnish word "taikatalvi" means "magic winter". It is also the Finnish title of the book Moominland Midwinter. "Storytime" was released as the first single of the album on 9 November 2011, and quickly topped the Finnish single charts. Holopainen has described it as the band's first single to represent the entire album, being different from the singles "Eva" and "Amaranth" which Holopainen didn't feel do the same for Dark Passion Play. He has also said that it greatly represents the band as a whole, with "punchy riffs and a melodic chorus" and an orchestra heavy C-part. "Ghost River" has been described as "a duel between the Devil and Mother Gaia", and is more theatrical and "weirder" than the rest of the album. It was also one of the first songs on the album to be written.

"Slow Love Slow" is not technically a ballad, instead being a jazz-like song inspired by American 1930s nightclub music, a genre new to the band. It is also influenced by David Lynch and his Twin Peaks, and Holopainen has called it a certain surprise for many. "I Want My Tears Back" features Troy Donockley on pipes, and is according to Holopainen one of the more approachable songs on first listen, as well as a possible future single. "Scaretale" has been described as "quite the opposite", and is about childhood nightmares, being Nightwish's version (lyrically) of Metallica's "Enter Sandman", and also homages the Disney song "Grim Grinning Ghosts", with "Scaretale"'s original working title having been "Haunted Mansion Ride". "Arabesque" is an instrumental, which was constructed especially for a scene needed in the movie. It is one of two instrumentals on the album, alongside the title track; thus Imaginaerum contains the most instrumentals yet on a Nightwish album (counting the "Lappi" series on Angels Fall First as a single song). "Turn Loose the Mermaids" is a "celtic ballad, sad, melancholic" song, and one of only two "real ballads" on Imaginaerum, and with a Spaghetti Western inspired C-part.

"Rest Calm" is one of the heavier songs on the album, inspired by doom metal bands such as Paradise Lost and My Dying Bride, and is a mid-tempo and heavy but still melodic song that "gets totally out of hand in the end". "The Crow, the Owl and the Dove" is one of only two ballads in the album, co-written by Holopainen and bassist-vocalist Marko Hietala, who has written several songs for the band in the past. Holopainen has pointed out that it's "kind of funny that the most poppy ballad on the album is composed by the most metalhead dude in the band". The song also contains some Troy Donockley's lead vocals before his tin whistle solo part.

"Last Ride of the Day" is inspired by being on a roller coaster. "Song of Myself" is inspired by Holopainen's favorite poet Walt Whitman, and his famous Song of Myself. It is "the epic one on the album", 13 minutes and 30 seconds in length and divided into four parts:

1. "From a Dusty Bookshelf" (0:00–0:23): The instrumental intro of the track.
2. "All That Great Heart Lying Still" (0:23–3:35): The first half of the actual song.
3. "Piano Black" (3:35–6:53): The second half of the actual song.
4. "Love" (6:53–13:30): The entire second half of the complete track, containing nothing but ambient symphonic metal music and spoken narrations.

"Imaginaerum", the title track, is the outro track of the album, conceived as what could run in the credits of the movie. Holopainen came up with the idea of making a medley of the album's main musical themes, and gave orchestral arranger Pip Williams free hands to make what he wanted of it, making it one of two songs of the album not composed entirely by Holopainen.

== Reception ==
Professional ratings
Review scores
Source	Rating
About.com	4.5/5 stars
AllMusic	3.5/5 stars
Angry Metal Guy	4/5 stars
Loudwire	4.5/5 stars
Metal Hammer (GER)	7/7 stars
metal1.info (GER)	10/10 stars
Metal Storm	7/10 stars
Ultimate Guitar	8.7/10 stars

About.com gave the album four and a half stars out of five, stating that "Sometimes albums are so diverse that they become disjointed, but that never happens here. Even though there are a lot of different styles represented, there's still a cohesiveness and common thread tying everything together."

MSN Music praised the album, writing "Incredibly, Imaginaerum pulls off the near-unthinkable, a 75 minute symphonic metal album that's engaging, imaginative, flamboyant, and above all else, fun."

Steve Harris, the bassist, founder, and main composer of Iron Maiden, chronicles his great appreciation for the sound of the band in a statement: “When I heard [2007’s] Dark Passion Play, I couldn't believe it. I thought, ‘Now, this is a proper fucking album.’ It's got everything bar the kitchen sink in there. It was controversial because of the new singer [Anette Olzon], but she was brilliant. No disrespect to Tarja, but Anette's voice suited them a lot better. There's heavy stuff, classical, even a bit of Disney – all kinds of shit in there. I think it's one of the best-sounding albums I’ve ever heard in my life. Then I got the next one, [2011's] Imaginaerum. Storytime is a fantastic, instant song. The rest of the album took me a while to get into. Dark Passion Play was so good, I thought there was no way they could ever come up with an album that's anywhere near that, but the more I got into Imaginaerum, the more I loved it."

=== Promotion ===
The release of Imaginaerum was followed by a world tour, named the Imaginaerum World Tour. The tour started in Los Angeles on 21 January 2012. Finnish metal band Amorphis supported Nightwish on this portion of the tour. The European leg of the tour began on 2 March 2012 in Joensuu, Finland. When the tour returned to North America following the European leg of the tour, Nightwish was supported by Kamelot.

During the US tour, singer Anette Olzon fell ill at the show in Denver on 28 September 2012. Elize Ryd and Alissa White-Gluz, the back-up singers for Kamelot, stepped in to help perform the show. After the Denver show, Nightwish posted the following message on its Facebook page: "We were in hell [yesterday]. Vocalist in a hospital. Show about to be canceled... But nobody gave up an inch. With the help from the ladies Elize and Alissa from KAMELOT, we actually managed to pull of a relaxed and great show! The crowd doing the mass karaoke with the band playing was absolutely amazing. We were humbled and grateful at the same time. This is unity and help from friends and fans." Two days later, Olzon was let go from the band with Floor Jansen being called to finish the tour in her place. Jansen was announced as the new lead singer of Nightwish in October 2013.

== Packaging ==
The cover art was done by Janne "Toxic Angel" Pitkänen, who had previously done the cover art to Nightwish's 2007 album Dark Passion Play, as well as all single covers since "Eva" (2007). The cover art features the entrance to a desolate amusement park in winter night, with a giant full moon, parts of a roller coaster, and the title of the album reading across the park entrance. According to band leader Holopainen, he was very clear from the beginning that there should be "not a single living thing" in the picture, and believes that the picture holds a "sublime but desolate, 'all this is waiting for you, and only you' feeling".

What would ultimately become the cover was originally designed as album's centrefold image, but once Holopainen and a few others had seen it, they decided that it should be the cover. The picture was thus cut to fit a CD, but the original version, without cutting and without the band name across it, was released as a teaser in September 2011 on the band's website. Except what is seen on the album, this version also features more parts of the roller coaster as well as several zeppelins floating in the air above the park.

The cover to the first single, "Storytime", was also done by Toxic Angel, and ties together with the themes of snow, the blue colours and the roller coaster.

== Track listing ==
All lyrics are written by Tuomas Holopainen; all music is composed by Holopainen, except where noted.

Imaginaerum track listing
No.	Title	Music	Length
1.	"Taikatalvi" (Finnish for "Magic Winter")		2:35
2.	"Storytime"		5:22
3.	"Ghost River"		5:24
4.	"Slow, Love, Slow"		5:50
5.	"I Want My Tears Back"		5:07
6.	"Scaretale"		7:32
7.	"Arabesque" (instrumental)		2:52
8.	"Turn Loose the Mermaids"		4:18
9.	"Rest Calm"		6:59
10.	"The Crow, the Owl and the Dove"	Marko Hietala	4:08
11.	"Last Ride of the Day"		4:31
12.	"Song of Myself": I. "From a Dusty Bookshelf"; II. "All That Great Heart Lying Still"; III. "Piano Black"; IV. "Love"		13:30
13.	"Imaginaerum" (instrumental)		6:18
Total length:			74:26

=== Editions ===
To date sixteen different editions of Imaginaerum have been released:

- Regular/basic edition: The regular edition of the album, featuring the 13 tracks above.
- Two-CD Digipack edition: The regular album and a bonus disc which features instrumental versions of all the songs and is packaged in a Digipack. Includes a poster.
- Two-LP clear vinyl edition: The regular album on two clear vinyl records. It contains an A2 sized poster inside.
- Two-LP marbled vinyl edition: The regular album on two marbled vinyl records. It is limited to 250 copies and features an A2 sized poster inside.
- Two-LP grey vinyl edition: The regular album on two grey vinyl records. It is limited to 250 copies and features an A2 sized poster inside.
- Two-LP golden vinyl edition: The regular album on two golden vinyl records. It is limited to 100 copies and features an A2 sized poster inside.
- Two-LP white vinyl edition: The regular album on two white vinyl records. It contains an A2 sized poster inside.
- Two-LP picture disc edition: The regular album on two picture disc vinyl records. It contains an A2 sized poster inside.
- Two-CD Japan first pressing edition: The regular album and a bonus disc which features demo versions of the songs "I Want My Tears Back", "Slow, Love, Slow" and "The Crow, the Owl and the Dove", plus a demo version of "Storytime".
- Mailorder edition: The two-CD Digipack album with a bonus disc, featuring a demo of the song "Rest Calm". It also features an "Imaginaerum Mirror" and is packaged in a big box. It is limited to 1000 copies.
- Roadrunner edition: The band's label in North America, Roadrunner Records, released an additional digital version of the album, which contains all the tracks on the two-CD Digipack album plus four bonus tracks. It also includes demo versions of the songs "I Want My Tears Back", "Slow, Love, Slow" and "The Crow, the Owl and the Dove", plus a demo version of "Storytime". The package also included an exclusive T-shirt, signed lithograph by the band, and entry into a contest to win tickets to the 21 January 2012 show in Hollywood.
- Two-LP clear vinyl orchestral edition: The orchestral version of the album (12 tracks) on two clear vinyl records.
- Two-LP black vinyl orchestral edition: The orchestral version of the album (12 tracks) on two black vinyl records.
- Two-LP dark blue vinyl edition: The regular album on two dark blue vinyl records. It is limited to 150 copies and features an A2 sized poster inside.
- Two-LP black vinyl edition: The regular album on two black vinyl records.
- Tour edition: The regular album and a bonus disc which features orchestral versions of the songs (not to be confused with the instrumental versions found on the 2 CD digipack's bonus disk). It also includes a DVD containing a 90-minute documentary on the Imaginaerum film, and the music video for "Storytime". This edition comes packaged in a "Digibook" case.

== Charts ==
=== Weekly charts ===
Weekly chart performance for Imaginaerum
Chart (2011–2012)	Peak position
Australian Albums (ARIA)	57
Austrian Albums (Ö3 Austria)	9
Belgian Albums (Ultratop Flanders)	44
Belgian Albums (Ultratop Wallonia)	39
Canadian Albums (Billboard)	13
Czech Albums (ČNS IFPI)	14
Dutch Albums (Album Top 100)	24
Finnish Albums (Suomen virallinen lista)	1
French Albums (SNEP)	41
German Albums (Offizielle Top 100)	6
Hungarian Albums (MAHASZ)	21
Italian Albums (FIMI)	32
Italian Albums (Musica e dischi)	48
Japanese Albums (Oricon)	32
Mexican Albums (Top 100 Mexico)	22
Norwegian Albums (VG-lista)	17
Polish Albums (ZPAV)	19
Russian Albums (2M)	10
Scottish Albums (Official Charts)	63
Spanish Albums (Promusicae)	49
Swedish Albums (Sverigetopplistan)	3
Swiss Albums (Schweizer Hitparade)	3
UK Albums (Official Charts)	69
UK Rock & Metal Albums (Official Charts)	3
US Billboard 200	27
US Top Hard Rock Albums (Billboard)	2
US Top Rock Albums (Billboard)	7
US Top Tastemaker Albums (Billboard)	13

=== Year-end charts ===
2011 year-end chart performance for Imaginaerum
Chart (2011)	Position
Finnish Albums (Suomen virallinen lista)	1
German Albums (Offizielle Top 100)	51
Swedish Albums (Sverigetopplistan)	79
Swiss Albums (Schweizer Hitparade)	77

2012 year-end chart performance for Imaginaerum
Chart (2012)	Position
Russian Albums (2M)	44
Swiss Albums (Schweizer Hitparade)	52

== Certifications ==
Certifications for Imaginaerum
Region	Certification	Certified units/sales
Finland (Musiikkituottajat)	2× Platinum	67,932
Germany (BVMI)	Gold	100,000^{^}
Poland (ZPAV)	Gold	10,000^{*}
Switzerland (IFPI Switzerland)	Gold	15,000^{^}
^{*} Sales figures based on certification alone.^{^} Shipments figures based on certification alone.

== Personnel ==
=== Band ===
Called The Imagineers in the booklet.

- Anette Olzon – lead vocals
- Tuomas Holopainen – keyboards
- Emppu Vuorinen – guitars
- Marko Hietala – bass, male vocals (on track 1, 3–6, 9-10)
- Jukka Nevalainen – drums, percussion

=== Guest musicians ===
Called Fellow Imagineers in the booklet.

- Troy Donockley – uilleann pipes (on track 5 and 13), tin whistle (on track 1, 8 and 10), vocals (on track 10), spoken word (on track 12), bodhran, bouzouki
- Dermot Crehan – hardanger fiddle
- Dirk Campbell – sorna
- Guy Barker – solo trumpet
- Paul Clarvis and Stephen Henderson – ethnic percussion
- Pekka Kuusisto – violin
- "The loved ones & the fellowship" are credited for reciting the stanzas in track 12.
- Kai Hahto – percussion

=== Orchestra and choir ===
The choir group Metro Voices contributed vocals, led by choir mistress Jenny O'Grady. The Young Musicians London also contributed vocals, led by Lynda Richardson and co-ordinated by Jenny O'Grady.

The orchestra, The London Philharmonic Orchestra, called "The Looking Glass Orchestra", was led by Thomas Bowes and conducted by James Shearman.

The orchestra and choir was arranged, orchestrated and directed by Pip Williams.
