= Flugplatz Hildesheim-Drispenstedt =

Airfield and former military base in Germany

Flugplatz Hildesheim-Drispenstedt ~~Tofrek Barracks~~ ~~Flughafen Kaserne and Airfield~~
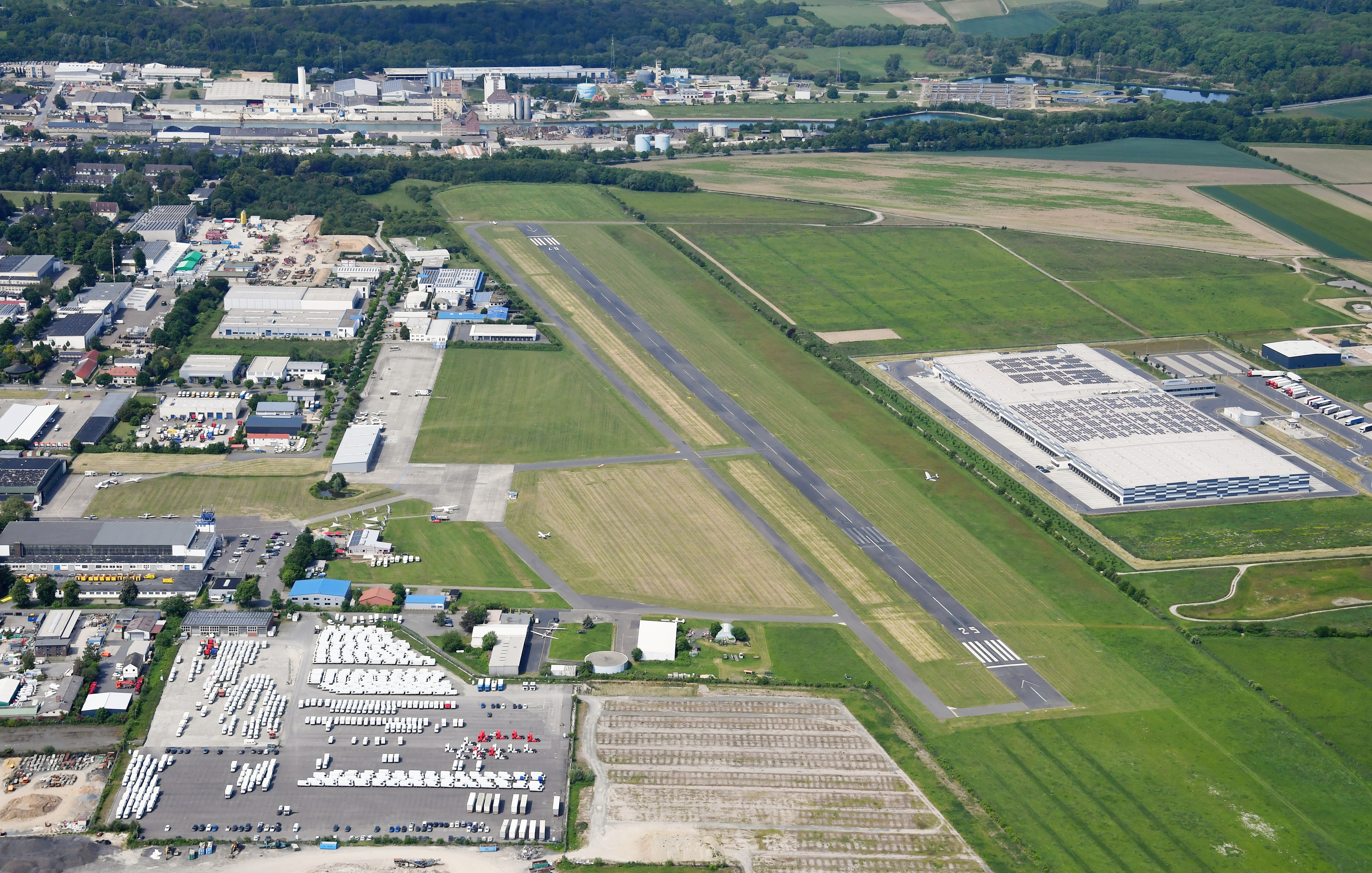
- IATA: ZNO; ICAO: EDVM

Summary
- Airport type: Verkehrslandeplatz / public airfield
- Operator: Flugplatz Hildesheim Betriebs GmbH
- Serves: Hildesheim, Germany
- Location: 3 km NNW Hildesheim city centre
- Opened: January 1, 1993
- Built: 1920
- In use: 1920-
- Elevation AMSL: 293 ft / 89 m
- Coordinates: 52°10′47″N 009°56′45″E
- Website: www.flugplatz-hildesheim.de

Map

Runways
Direction	Length		Surface
Direction	ft	m	Surface
07/25		1,220	Asphalt
07/25		1,220	Grass

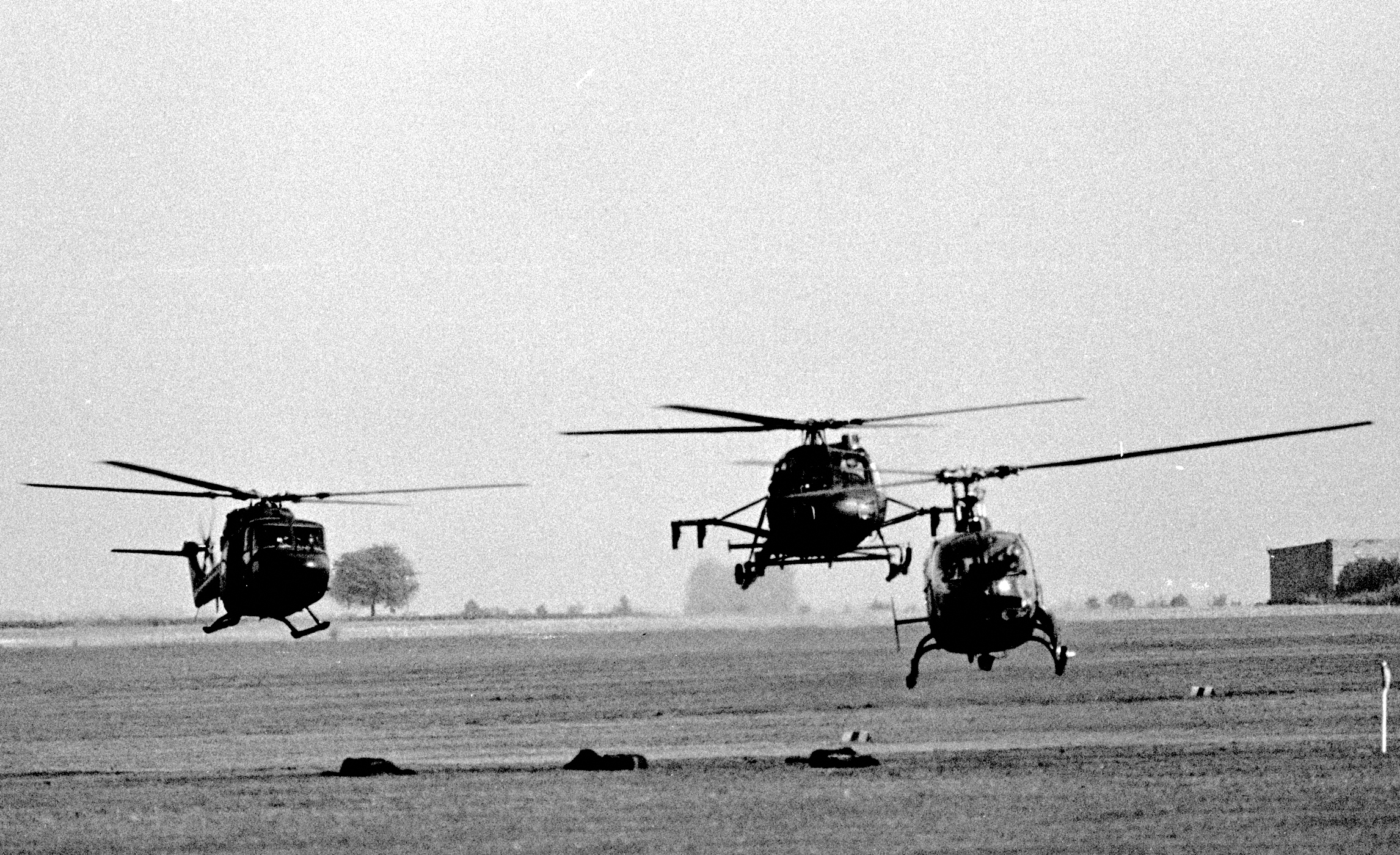
Westland Lynx, Westland Scout and Westland Gazelle helicopters (left to right) of 1 Regiment Army Air Corps in Hildesheim, West Germany in 1980.

Flugplatz Hildesheim-Drispenstedt is an airfield located near Hildesheim, Lower Saxony, Germany. It was formerly Tofrek Barracks a British Army installation used during both the Second World War and the Cold War.

The airfield is home to the M'era Luna Festival.
