= Imaginaerum (film) =

2012 Finnish-Canadian fantasy film

- Official poster
- Directed by: Stobe Harju
- Screenplay by: Stobe Harju; Mikko Rautalahti; Richard Jackson
- Story by: Stobe Harju; Tuomas Holopainen
- Produced by: Neil Dunn; Jukka Helle; André Rouleau; Markus Selin
- Starring: Marianne Farley; Quinn Lord; Francis-Xavier McCarthy; Ilkka Villi; Joanna Noyes; Keyanna Fielding; Stéphane Demers; Ron Lea; Hélène Robitaille
- Cinematography: Benoît Beaulieu
- Edited by: Mathieu Bélanger
- Music by: Nightwish; Petri Alanko
- Production companies: Solar Films; Caramel Films
- Distributed by: Scene Nation
- Release date: November 23, 2012
- Running time: 85 minutes
- Countries: Finland; Canada
- Language: English
- Budget: $3.7 million
- Box office: $190,819 (Finland, Russia, and Malaysia)

Imaginaerum (also promoted as Imaginaerum by Nightwish) is a 2012 fantasy film co-written and directed by Stobe Harju. It was developed with and features music from the Finnish symphonic metal band Nightwish's seventh studio album of the same name; Nightwish's keyboardist and songwriter Tuomas Holopainen co-wrote the film. Imaginaerum, which is produced by Markus Selin from Solar Films Inc. along with Nightwish, is the feature film debut of director Stobe Harju.

It received grants from the Finnish Film Foundation, a Finnish government institution. The film received $575,000 toward its $3.7 million budget. The film was originally titled Imaginarium, but the title was later changed to Imaginaerum in order to avoid mix-ups. The film was released on 23 November 2012 in Finland, followed by releases in Germany (21 March 2013), Australia (22 October 2014), and North America (16 June 2015).

== Plot ==
Thomas Whitman is a 75-year-old former musician who has lapsed into a coma after years of suffering from multi-infarct dementia. As he is clinging to his life while his estranged daughter Gem ponders on signing a do not resuscitate order, Thomas' mind enters a fantasy world where he relives his life as a ten-year-old orphan. After meeting a girl named Ann at the orphanage and acquiring a snow globe containing a dancing figurine named "Arabesque", young Thomas befriends a snowman named "Mr. White", who takes him on a flight to the skies. But while chasing his father Theodore's airplane, Thomas loses his balance and falls into a surreal world bordered by a run-down roller coaster track, which represents his mind and memories. As pieces of the track fall apart, a mechanic, symbolic of Thomas' doctor in the real world, complains about how futile it is to try to repair the track. The doctor looks to a younger Gem for advice who says they should just let it fall apart; this coincides with Gem agreeing to the DNR order in the real world. Thomas meets a younger version of Gem and a 72-year-old Ann, who warn him about Mr. White. He runs to a "dollhouse", where he sees himself and Ann in their 30s, as members of his band Whitman. The elderly Ann once again appears in front of him, warning him that the snowman is evil and is responsible for the loss of his memories.

As he travels to other parts of his past, young Thomas witnesses the simultaneous events of both his father and his older self lamenting the deaths of their wives. Suddenly, Theodore pulls a gun and shoots himself through his head while the older Thomas smashes the Arabesque globe against the wall, resulting in Thomas distancing himself from his daughter. He chases after Gem throughout the dream world as they both age to the present day.

Back in the real world, Gem arrives at Thomas' home, where she encounters Ann. It is revealed that when Thomas and Ann toured together with their band, Thomas' wife was killed in a car accident when Gem was a child. Because Thomas was not around during her childhood, Gem grew up resenting him throughout her life. Ann informs her that the night that Thomas' wife died, Thomas was with her, as he had stopped her from overdosing on drugs at the time, which reminded him too much of his father's suicide. Later, Ann opens a safe in Thomas' study, only to find sheets of paper containing incomprehensible writing. Ann makes Gem realize that in time Thomas grew as bitter as his own father due to their similar pasts. As a result, he pushed her away in order not to hurt her as his father did. Gem realizes that the notes are all of Thomas' memories when he found out about his dementia and that he did care for her after all. She spends the night piecing the sheets together to form a pattern on the floor. When the house experiences a power failure and Gem's cell phone dies, Ann drives Gem to the hospital.

Meanwhile, in his dream world, Thomas rediscovers his memories with Gem and is determined to hold on to them. He confronts Mr. White, who reveals himself as the manifestation of Theodore. During the ensuing roller coaster ride, Thomas relinquishes his grip on his father. In turn, he lets go of his last memories of Theodore, and holds onto those of Gem. He reaches the end of the roller coaster ride and awakens from his coma with Gem and Ann by his bedside. With his last breath, Thomas reconciles with his daughter before dying.

Gem returns to her father's home to play the grand piano. When she notices a key not playing right, she opens the lid and discovers a brass name plate lodged between the wires, removing it and placing it on the repaired snow globe. The name plate reads "G Em", revealing Gem's name as the keys G and E minor. Thomas mentions throughout the film that the two chords are key to his memories and all he wants is to hear them one last time. He told her that when the chords are played correctly, the Arabesque in the globe will spin. After Gem realizes Thomas really loved her, she plays the chord and the Arabesque spins, symbolizing their reconciliation.

== Cast ==
- Marianne Farley as Gem Whitman, age 35
- Quinn Lord as Thomas Whitman, age 10
- Francis-Xavier McCarthy as Thomas Whitman, age 75
- Ilkka Villi as Theodore Whitman / The Snowman
- Joanna Noyes as Ann, age 73
- Keyanna Fielding as Gem Whitman, age 7
- Stéphane Demers as Twisted Tin Soldier
- Ron Lea as Dr. Jansson
- Hélène Robitaille as Arabesque
- Victoria Anne Jung as Ann, age 8
- Elias Toufexis as The Voice of Mr. White
- Madison McAleer as Orphan Girl
- Glenda Braganza as Tom's Nurse

Nightwish members

- Tuomas Holopainen as Thomas Whitman, ages 34 and 47
- Anette Olzon as Ann, age 32
- Marko Hietala as Marcus, age 35
- Emppu Vuorinen as Emil, age 32
- Jukka Nevalainen as Jack, age 34
- Troy Donockley as Magician / Gem's Assistant

== Soundtrack ==
Imaginaerum: The Score

Soundtrack album by Nightwish
- Released: 9 November 2012
- Genres: Film score; symphonic metal
- Length: 53:37
- Label: Scene Nation/Nuclear Blast
- Producers: Petri Alanko; Tuomas Holopainen

The score of the film was officially released by Nuclear Blast on November 9, 2012, on digital and CD formats. The tracks on the score are reinterpretations by Petri Alanko of songs previously released on the band's album Imaginaerum. The songs "Slow, Love, Slow", "Scaretale" and an instrumental version of "I Want My Tears Back" from the Imaginaerum album are also featured in the film.

All tracks are written by Tuomas Holopainen, except where noted.

No.	Title	Lyrics	Music	Length
1.	"Find Your Story"			2:30
2.	"Orphanage Airlines"			4:34
3.	"Undertow"			5:17
4.	"Spying in the Doorway"			3:03
5.	"A Crackling Sphere"			3:59
6.	"Sundown"			5:33
7.	"Wonderfields"			5:31
8.	"Hey Buddy"			3:03
9.	"Deeper Down"	Holopainen	Marko Hietala	3:28
10.	"Dare to Enter"			1:50
11.	"I Have to Let You Go"			8:16
12.	"Heart Lying Still"			4:00
13.	"From G to E Minor"			2:32

=== Personnel ===
Nightwish

- Tuomas Holopainen – keyboards
- Marko Hietala – bass, vocals
- Emppu Vuorinen – guitars
- Jukka Nevalainen – drums, percussion
- Anette Olzon – vocals
- Troy Donockley – Uilleann pipes, low whistle, bodhrán, bouzouki

Orchestra

- The Looking Glass Orchestra – orchestra
- Pip Williams – orchestrator
- James Shearman – conductor
- Isobel Griffiths – contractor
- Thomas Bowes – orchestra leader
- Pekka Kuusisto – violin
- Dermot Crehan – Hardanger fiddle
- Jussi Tegelman – music box
- Dirk Campbell – zurna
- Petri Alanko – additional synthesizers
- Paul Clarvis – ethnic percussion
- Stephen Henderson – ethnic percussion
- Kai Hahto – additional percussion
- Metro Voices – chorus
- The Young Musicians London – children's choir

=== Charts ===
Chart (2012)	Peak position
Belgian Ultratop (Flanders)	101
Belgian Ultratop (Wallonia)	131
Finnish Albums Chart	12

== Production ==
=== Development ===
In the beginning of autumn 2008, Nightwish frontman Tuomas Holopainen first introduced the idea for the film to fellow band members and to film director Stobe Harju with whom the band had worked on the music video for "The Islander". Harju immediately liked the concept. Holopainen's original idea was to shoot a music video for each of the thirteen songs of the album, but Harju suggested they should also include dialogue. Both started pre-production on Imaginaerum and Harju wrote a 70-page first draft of the screenplay based on Holopainen's original ideas. It was decided that instead of a collection of separate music videos they should create a full movie with a bigger story. The film was developed simultaneously with the album.

On the story, Holopainen commented: "I wanted to convey a positive message and a sense of carpe diem. The movie is about the joy of being alive and the beauty of the world." For the visuals of the film, he cited the works of Tim Burton, Neil Gaiman and Salvador Dalí as inspirations. Harju described the musical style of Imaginaerum as "a cross between Moulin Rouge! and Pink Floyd's The Wall". The film will heavily feature CGI and other special effects.

Nightwish members appear both as themselves playing some of the songs and in small supporting roles featuring dialogue. Holopainen appears as "a gray and wrinkled 50-year-old". Harju wanted the audience "to feel the presence of Nightwish" and designed the names of the characters the band members are playing to resemble their own names: Anette Olzon plays Ann, Tuomas Holopainen plays Tom, Marko Hietala plays Marcus, Emppu Vuorinen plays Emil and Jukka Nevalainen plays Jack.

Some of the music in the movie will be slightly different from that of the album and there will be also a score written by Petri Alanko, who composed the video game Alan Wake for which Harju directed the cutscenes. According to Holopainen the running time of the film will be "around 80 minutes".

At the end of May 2011 final changes were made to the screenplay and part of the post-production was started before the actual shooting. It was revealed that there is an animated character who "will surely be remembered by many a Nightwish fan". A blog update on Nightwish's site stated that "Imaginaerum will in no way be a children’s movie but a dark and foreboding fantasy; a dream world that lacks no surprises."

The film was first announced publicly on February 10, 2011, on the official site of Nightwish. A teaser poster by Janne "Toxic Angel" Pitkänen was released and a trailer is expected to be released before the end of 2011.

Casting was completed in August 2011. Shooting was completed in 18 days between September and October 2011, mostly in Montreal, Quebec, Canada due to the incentives the country offers to foreign movie productions. Bassist Marko Hietala revealed that all scenes featuring Nightwish have already been completed as of September 23, 2011.

On October 11, 2011, the cast was announced on the official website, including Francis X. McCarthy, Quinn Lord, Marianne Farley, Joanna Noyes, Ilkka Villi, Keyanna Fielding, Ron Lea, Victoria Jung, Hélène Robitaille, and Stephane Demers.

A teaser trailer of the film was uploaded to Nightwish's YouTube channel on April 24, 2012, while a full theatrical trailer of the film was released on 16 October 2012.

The world premiere of the film was on 10 November 2012 at the Hartwall Arena in Helsinki.

== Reception ==
Metal Hammer commented that the film is "definitely a must-see for Nightwish fans" while saying that "While some scenes feel a little contrived, the cinematography is stunning and the use of Nightwish’s music is tastefully done, with the score complementing the Imaginaerum album perfectly." Blabbermouth stated that "Imaginaerum creates a musical fantasy world in the vein of David Lynch, Neil Gaiman, and Cirque du Soleil. The movie is an innovative mixture of story-telling and music, an extraordinary tale of the power of imagination… and what's ultimately important in life." Juha Rosenqvist of Film-O-Holic gave the film a score of 3 out of 5 stars, also commenting that the movie was done more for the band fans than the overall public, while commenting that the film "is a huge ambition of Nightwish's musical landscape visualization of the mind, where the music video narrative means a tightrope artists stretched to feature-length film frames." The review also commented that the character Thomas Whitman is "a certain level of Tuomas Holopainen's alter ego". About its premiere on North America's Fantasia Festival, Ariel Esteban Cayer stated that the film is "a must for die-hard Nightwish fans, of course, but also recommended to enthusiasts of dark fantasy, sombre musicals, the macabre and the enchanting."

== Home media ==
Imaginaerum was released on Blu-ray in Germany on 31 May 2013 and in Australia on 22 October 2014. The film was also released in North America on 16 June 2015. The film was released in the UK by High Fliers Films as Imaginaerum - The Other World on 17 October 2016.

== Accolades ==
Year	Award	Category	Recipient(s)	Result	Ref.
2013	Young Artist Award	Best Performance in a Feature Film - Leading Young Actor	Quinn Lord	Nominated	
