= Diamond Ballroom =

- The Diamond
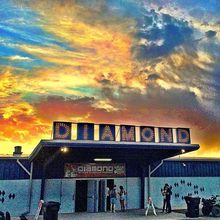
- Diamond Ballroom
- Interactive map of Diamond Ballroom
- Address: 8001 South Eastern Avenue
- Location: Oklahoma City, Oklahoma, United States
- Coordinates: 35.3863°N 97.4785°W
- Events: Country, Rock n' Roll, Metal & Blues

Construction
- Built: 1964
- Opened: November 21, 1964

Website
- diamondballroom.com

Diamond Ballroom is a historic music venue and dance hall located in Oklahoma City, Oklahoma. The building opened in November 21, 1964. Oklahoma City attorney Ralph Russell, Sr. and several local business partners opened the venue wanting to provide a space for local and traveling country-swing bands to perform in Oklahoma City. The building was originally advertised as "The Largest Dance Floor in the Southwest" with a 50 foot by 150 foot maple wood floor. The Diamond Ballroom continues to provide Oklahoma City with a place to see live music and touring musicians.

== History ==
The original concept for The Diamond was to emulate "ranch dances" made popular in the 1940s and 1950s. The room was set up with a farmhouse facade and the stage made to look like a large patio porch. This was similar to the Grand Ole Opry and other popular programs of the time. Elements of the original design can still be seen in the room today. The building was known as the Diamond Entertainment Center during its initial years. The Diamond Ballroom originally featured a house band called Perry Jones and His Diamondairs who performed original songs and country classics of the time. The band performed at the Grand Opening in 1964 and was showcased weekly for the next 10 years, having a Friday and Saturday night residency.

In 1974 Ralph Russell, Sr. purchased the building from his original business partners. Ralph, Sr. became the first sole owner of the Diamond Ballroom. Russell soon after the purchase retired from his legal career and turned the Diamond Ballroom into a family business. He employed his son and son-in-law as staff members and had his wife handle the bookkeeping. Notable performances in the 1960s and 1970s included: Willie Nelson, Merle Haggard, Waylon Jennings, Loretta Lynn, George Jones, Bob Wills and the Texas Playboys, Wanda Jackson, Conway Twitty, Charley Pride, Buck Owens, Hank Williams, Jr., David Allan Coe, Jerry Lee Lewis along with many others.

In the mid 1980s Ralph Russell, Sr. entrusted ownership and operations of the Diamond Ballroom to his son Ralph Russell, Jr. Ralph Russell, Jr. expanded the Diamond Ballroom's days of business by opening its doors during weeknights. Ralph Russell, Jr. also began to bring more types of music to the venue. Traditionally a home for country-western swing music, the Diamond began to associate with local promoters who booked notable rock n' roll and metal acts of the time. Artists included: Pantera, Slayer, Megadeth, White Zombie, Sepultura, The Cramps, Alice In Chains, Steve Vai, Stone Temple Pilots and countless others.

The Diamond Ballroom continues to book shows and private events to this day.
