= Imaginarium SA =

Spanish children's toys company

Imaginarium SA was a Spanish company that operated a chain of toy stores. It sold various toys comprising wheel, furniture, and child care toys to various customers, including educational institutions, such as schools, nurseries, or playgroups. Imaginarium SA was incorporated in 1992 and was headquartered in Zaragoza, Spain. During its prime, the company had nearly 800 employees and operated 420 stores across 20 countries. The company was dissolved after being acquired by Spanish toy company Juguettos in 2024 for €240.000.
