= Last Ride of the Day =

Song by Nightwish

from the album Imaginaerum
- Released: November 30, 2011
- Genre: Symphonic metal
- Length: 4:31
- Label: Sony
- Songwriter(s): Tuomas Holopainen
- Producer(s): Tero Kinnunen

"Last Ride of the Day" is the eleventh track from the Finnish symphonic metal band Nightwish's seventh studio album Imaginaerum. This track was chosen as the official anthem for the Ice Hockey World Championships 2012 in Finland/Sweden.

DJ Orkidea produced a remix of the song as the new entrance music of the Kiteen Pallo sports team. Nightwish had previously created an early version of a song titled "Kiteen Pallo" (kipa.mp3 on YouTube) for the team in the past. Both versions of the songs (kipa.mp3 for the original, and KIPA-90.mp3 for Orkidea's remix) could be found on the Nightwish.com website in the past, but have since been removed when the site was revamped for the release of Imaginaerum.

A new video related to the song has been released in 2022.
