= Once Upon a Tour =

2004–2005 concert tour by Nightwish

- Tour by Nightwish
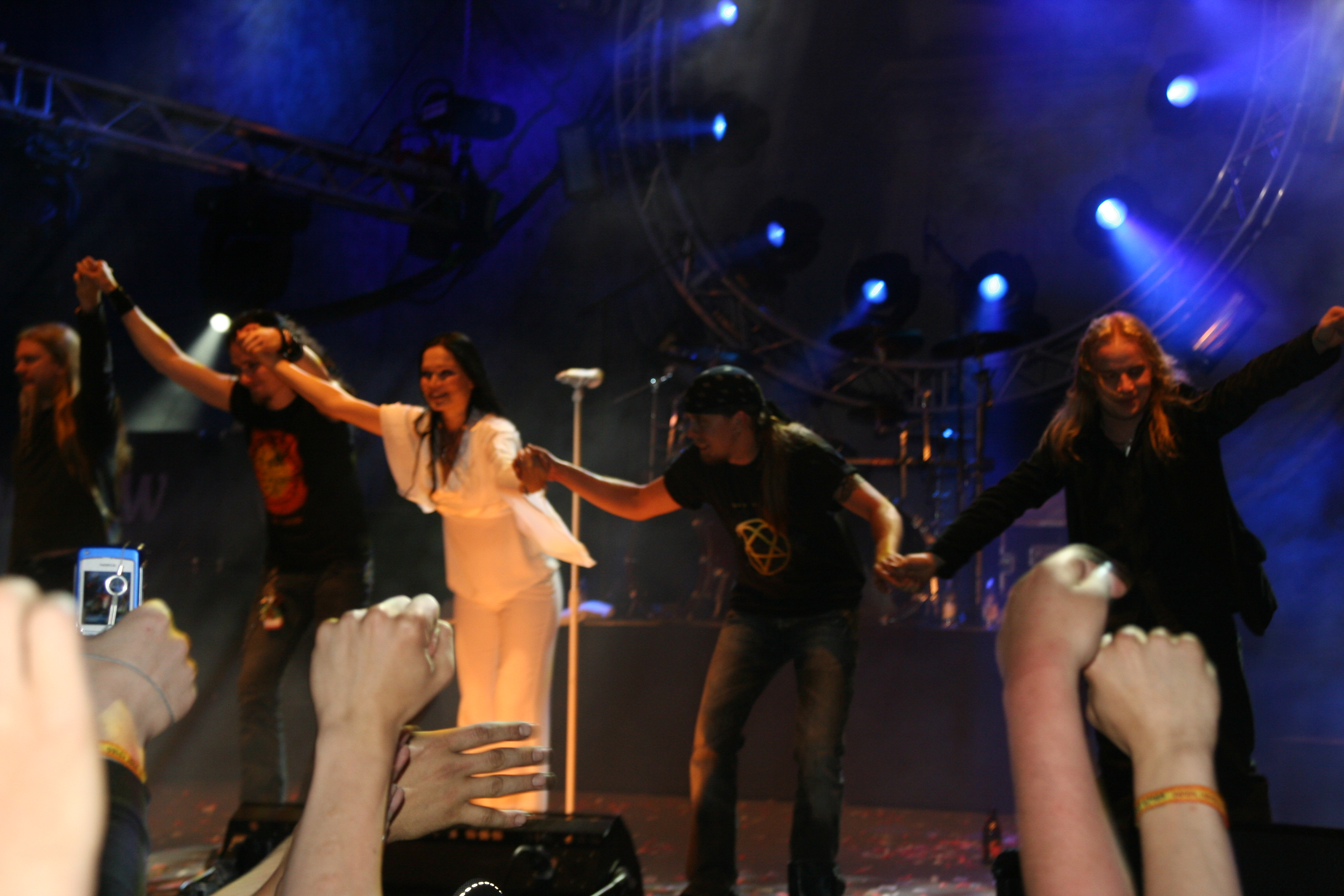
- Nightwish live at "Himos Festival" in Jämsä, Finland, on June 25, 2004
- Location: Asia; Europe; North America; Oceania; South America
- Associated album: Once; Highest Hopes
- Start date: May 22, 2004
- End date: October 21, 2005
- No. of shows: 130

Nightwish concert chronology
- World Tour of the Century (2002–2003); Once Upon a Tour (2004–2005); Dark Passion Play World Tour (2007–2009)

Once Upon a Tour was a concert tour by the Finnish symphonic metal band Nightwish, in 2004 and 2005, to promote the release of their fifth album, Once, released June 7, 2004. A new greatest hits compilation, Highest Hopes, was also released to tie in with the tour. The albums combined with the band's most expansive merchandise campaign by Nuclear Blast Records meant this tour was heralded as the band's most important in many years. Many of the band's songs had not been played in a long time.

== Background ==
The success of the album allowed the band to perform in many countries they had never visited before: Colombia, Ecuador, Scotland, Estonia, Greece, Romania, Denmark, Japan, Australia, Portugal, and Slovenia. The band also played their first tour in the United States, with various sold-out concerts; the South American leg also sold out all its concerts. A second tour was planned in the US, but it was cancelled by Tarja Turunen, who also cancelled some concerts in Australia.

After touring in Europe and South America in late 2004, and some separate shows in December, the band had some time off in January 2005. In February, Nightwish won five Emma-Gala Awards (Finnish Grammy); among other awards, they won "The Band of the Year" and "The Best Selling Album of the Year". Tuomas Holopainen and Marko Hietala flew to Helsinki to receive the awards from touring in Europe. In March, Nightwish performed for the first time in Japan and Australia; in April and May, they had to have a break because of Turunen's other interests; but at the end of May, the band resumed the tour by playing with Iron Maiden in Poland and Mötley Crüe in Norway. During late 2005, Nightwish played several shows including a sold-out performance at the legendary Hammersmith Apollo in London. The last show on the European tour, in Stuttgart, Germany was up until then their biggest gig, with an audience of ten thousand.

The final concert was played on October 21 for 11,500 people in Hartwall Areena in Helsinki. The concert was also recorded to be released as an End of an Era live DVD and CD.

This was the last tour with Tarja Turunen; after the last concert the four other members of Nightwish decided it was best to continue Nightwish without Turunen, a feeling they expressed through an open letter Holopainen gave Turunen after the show, afterwards posted on the band's website. It was written by Holopainen but signed by the other band members. The main justification for Turunen's dismissal given in the letter was the band felt both her husband Marcelo Cabuli (an Argentine businessman) and commercial interests had changed her attitude towards the band. In May 2007, former Alyson Avenue frontwoman Anette Olzon was revealed as Turunen's replacement.

== Set lists ==
=== 2004 ===
1. "Dark Chest of Wonders"
2. "Planet Hell"
3. "Deep Silent Complete"
4. "She Is My Sin"
5. "The Phantom of the Opera" (Andrew Lloyd Webber cover)
6. "Ever Dream"
7. "Symphony of Destruction" (Megadeth cover)
8. "Sleeping Sun"
9. "Bless the Child"
10. "The Trooper" ("Wishmaster" intro)
11. "Wishmaster"
12. "Nemo"
13. "Slaying the Dreamer"
14. "Over the Hills and Far Away" (Gary Moore cover)
  Encore
15. "Dead Boy's Poem"
16. "Ghost Love Score"
17. "Wish I Had an Angel"

=== 2005 ===
1. "Dark Chest of Wonders"
2. "Ever Dream"
3. "Planet Hell"
4. "The Kinslayer"
5. "The Siren"
6. "The Phantom of the Opera" (Andrew Lloyd Webber cover)
7. "High Hopes" (Pink Floyd cover)
8. "The Trooper" ("Wishmaster" intro)
9. "Wishmaster"
10. "Bless the Child"
11. "Slaying the Dreamer"
12. "Kuolema Tekee Taiteilijan"
13. "Nemo"
  Encore
14. "Sleeping Sun"
15. "Ghost Love Score"
16. "Wish I Had an Angel"

== Tour dates ==
List of 2004 concerts, showing date, city, country, venue and support act(s)
| Date | City | Country | Venue | Support Act(s) |
|---|---|---|---|---|
| May 22, 2004 | Kitee | Finland | Ice Hall | Timo Rautiainen |
| May 29, 2004 | Tallinn | Estonia | Von Krahl Theatre | —N/a |
| May 30, 2004 | Tallinn | Estonia | Von Krahl Theatre | —N/a |
| June 5, 2004 (Note: The June 5, 2004, concert was a part of Dynamo Open Air.) | Nijmegen | Netherlands | Goffertpark | —N/a |
| June 11, 2004 (Note: The June 11, 2004, concert was a part of Sauna Open Air.) | Tampere | Finland | Eteläpuisto | —N/a |
| June 12, 2004 (Note: The June 12, 2004, concert was a part of Sweden Rock Festival.) | Sölvesborg | Sweden | Norje Havsbad | —N/a |
| June 19, 2004 (Note: The June 19, 2004, concert was a part of Woodstage Open Air.) | Glauchau | Germany | Gründelpark | —N/a |
| June 20, 2004 (Note: The June 20, 2004, concert was a part of Rockwave Festival.) | Malakasa | Greece | Terra Vibe Park | —N/a |
| July 10, 2004 (Note: The July 10, 2004, concert was a part of Ruisrock.) | Turku | Finland | Ruissalo | —N/a |
| July 11, 2004 (Note: The July 11, 2004, concert was a part of San Fermin.) | Pamplona | Spain | Carpa Rojilla | —N/a |
| July 13, 2004 | Bradford | England | Bradford Rio | —N/a |
| July 14, 2004 | Nottingham | England | Rock City | —N/a |
| July 16, 2004 | London | England | Astoria Theatre | Brainstorm |
| July 17, 2004 (Note: The July 17, 2004, concert was a part of Tuska Open Air.) | Helsinki | Finland | Kaisaniemi Park | —N/a |
| July 21, 2004 | Oslo | Norway | Rockefeller Music Hall | Entwined |
| August 20, 2004 | Worcester | United States | Palladium | Lullacry |
| August 22, 2004 | New York City | United States | B.B. King's Blues Club | Lullacry |
| August 23, 2004 | Cleveland | United States | Phantasy Theater | Lullacry |
| August 24, 2004 | Cleveland | United States | Phantasy Theater | Lullacry |
| August 25, 2004 | Chicago | United States | House of Blues | Lullacry |
| August 26, 2004 | Minneapolis | United States | Quest Club | Lullacry |
| August 28, 2004 | Denver | United States | Cervantes Club | Lullacry |
| August 30, 2004 | Scottsdale | United States | Cajun House | Lullacry |
| August 31, 2004 | Anaheim | United States | House of Blues | Lullacry |
| September 1, 2004 | Los Angeles | United States | House of Blues | Lullacry |
| September 3, 2004 | San Francisco | United States | Slim's Club | Lullacry |
| September 5, 2004 | Seattle | United States | Graceland Club | Lullacry |
| September 17, 2004 | Tampere | Finland | Pakkahuone Theatre | Twilightning |
| September 18, 2004 | Turku | Finland | Karibia Resort | Twilightning |
| September 21, 2004 | Helsinki | Finland | Nosturi Club | —N/a |
| September 22, 2004 | Helsinki | Finland | Nosturi Club | —N/a |
| September 25, 2004 | Jyväskylä | Finland | Paviljonki Areena | Twilightning |
| September 29, 2004 | Stockholm | Sweden | Stora Arenan | Lordi |
| October 1, 2004 | Gothenburg | Sweden | Lisebergshallen | Lordi |
| October 2, 2004 | Malmö | Sweden | Baltiska Hallen | Lordi |
| October 13, 2004 | Hamburg | Germany | Color Line Arena | Sonata Arctica |
| October 15, 2004 | Leipzig | Germany | Arena | Sonata Arctica |
| October 16, 2004 | Erfurt | Germany | Thüringenhalle | Sonata Arctica |
| October 19, 2004 | Cologne | Germany | Palladium | Sonata Arctica |
| October 20, 2004 | Berlin | Germany | Treptow Arena | Sonata Arctica |
| October 22, 2004 | Nuremberg | Germany | Arena | Sonata Arctica |
| October 23, 2004 | Munich | Germany | Zenith | Sonata Arctica |
| October 25, 2004 | Vienna | Austria | Gasometer | Sonata Arctica |
| October 26, 2004 | Budapest | Hungary | Petőfi Csarnok | Sonata Arctica |
| October 28, 2004 | Milan | Italy | PalaSharp | Sonata Arctica |
| October 30, 2004 | Basel | Switzerland | St. Jakob Arena | Sonata Arctica |
| November 1, 2004 | Lyon | France | Le Transbordeur | Sonata Arctica |
| November 4, 2004 | Madrid | Spain | Centro Aqualung | Sonata Arctica |
| November 5, 2004 | Barcelona | Spain | Razamatazz 1 | Sonata Arctica |
| November 7, 2004 (Note: The November 7, 2004, concert was a part of Metal Female Voices Fest.) | Brussels | Belgium | Ancienne Belgique | —N/a |
| November 8, 2004 | Amsterdam | Netherlands | Paradiso Club | Sonata Arctica |
| November 19, 2004 | Bucharest | Romania | Sala Palatului | Sonata Arctica |
| November 21, 2004 | Paris | France | Le Zénith | Conscience |
| November 27, 2004 | Buenos Aires | Argentina | Arena Obras | —N/a |
| November 28, 2004 | Campinas | Brazil | Usina Royal | —N/a |
| November 30, 2004 | Rio de Janeiro | Brazil | Canecão | —N/a |
| December 2, 2004 | Porto Alegre | Brazil | Opinião Club | —N/a |
| December 3, 2004 | Belo Horizonte | Brazil | Chevrolet Hall | —N/a |
| December 4, 2004 | São Paulo | Brazil | Via Funchal | —N/a |
| December 8, 2004 | Bogotá | Colombia | Gran Salon de Corferias | —N/a |
| December 10, 2004 | Quito | Ecuador | Plaza de Toros | Viuda Negra |
| December 12, 2004 | Mexico City | Mexico | Circo Volador | —N/a |
| December 13, 2004 | Mexico City | Mexico | Circo Volador | —N/a |
| December 15, 2004 | Montreal | Canada | Métropolis | Heaven's Cry |
| December 16, 2004 | Montreal | Canada | Métropolis | Heaven's Cry |
| December 18, 2004 | Toronto | Canada | Opera House | Aesma Daeva |
| December 26, 2004 | Helsinki | Finland | Ice Hall | After Forever |
| December 28, 2004 (Note: The December 28 and 29, 2004, concerts were a part of On A Dark Winter's Night.) | Oberhausen | Germany | König-Pilsener-Arena | —N/a |
| December 29, 2004 | Hamburg | Germany | Friedrichshafen Messehalle | —N/a |

List of 2005 concerts, showing date, city, country, venue and support act(s)
| Date | City | Country | Venue | Support Act(s) |
|---|---|---|---|---|
| February 9, 2005 | Copenhagen | Denmark | Store Vega | —N/a |
| February 11, 2005 | Amsterdam | Netherlands | Heineken Music Hall | After Forever |
| February 12, 2005 | London | England | Astoria Theatre | Tristania |
| February 15, 2005 | Birmingham | England | O2 Academy | Tristania |
| February 16, 2005 | Glasgow | Scotland | Barrowland Ballroom | Tristania |
| February 18, 2005 | Manchester | England | Apollo Theatre | Tristania |
| February 19, 2005 | London | England | Astoria Theatre | Tristania |
| February 21, 2005 | Wieze | Belgium | Oktoberhallen | Tristania |
| February 22, 2005 | Trier | Germany | Arena | Tristania |
| February 24, 2005 | Braunschweig | Germany | Volkswagen Halle | Tristania |
| February 26, 2005 | Bayreuth | Germany | Oberfrankenhalle | Tristania |
| February 27, 2005 | Chur | Switzerland | Stadthalle | Tristania |
| February 28, 2005 | Stuttgart | Germany | Schleyer-Halle | Tristania |
| March 12, 2005 | Osaka | Japan | Namba Hatch | Angra |
| March 13, 2005 | Fukuoka | Japan | Zepp Hall | Angra |
| March 16, 2005 | Tokyo | Japan | Shibuya AX | Angra |
| March 17, 2005 | Tokyo | Japan | Shibuya AX | Angra |
| March 21, 2005 | Melbourne | Australia | Corner Hotel | Vanishing Point |
| March 22, 2005 | Melbourne | Australia | Corner Hotel | Vanishing Point |
| March 23, 2005 | Sydney | Australia | Metro Theatre | Dungeon |
| March 26, 2005 | Brisbane | Australia | Arena | —N/a |
| May 26, 2005 | Budapest | Hungary | Petőfi Csarnok | —N/a |
| May 27, 2005 (Note: The May 27, 2005, concert was a part of Festimad.) | Madrid | Spain | Parque Natural de la Cantueña | —N/a |
| May 29, 2005 (Note: The May 29, 2005, concert was a part of Mystic Festival.) | Chorzów | Poland | Silesian Stadium | —N/a |
| June 10, 2005 | Oslo | Norway | Spektrum Arena | —N/a |
| June 11, 2005 (Note: The June 11, 2005, concert was a part of Nova Rock Festival.) | Nickelsdorf | Austria | Pannonia Fields II | —N/a |
| June 12, 2005 (Note: The June 12, 2005, concert was a part of Download Festival.) | Leicestershire | England | Donington Park | —N/a |
| June 17, 2005 (Note: The June 17, 2005, concert was a part of Provinssirock.) | Seinäjoki | Finland | Törnävä | —N/a |
| June 18, 2005 (Note: The June 18, 2005, concert was a part of Frauenfeld Open Air.) | Frauenfeld | Switzerland | Grosse Allmend | —N/a |
| June 24, 2005 (Note: The June 24, 2005, concert was a part of Himos Festival.) | Jämsä | Finland | Himos Areena | —N/a |
| July 15, 2005 (Note: The July 15, 2005, concert was a part of Masters of Rock.) | Zlín | Czech Republic | Areál likérky R. Jelínek | —N/a |
| July 16, 2005 (Note: The July 16, 2005, concert was a part of Evolution Festival.) | Toscolano-Maderno | Italy | Campo Sportivo | —N/a |
| July 22, 2005 (Note: The July 22, 2005, concert was a part of Earthshaker Festival.) | Erfurt | Germany | Eventzentrum Strohofer | —N/a |
| July 28, 2005 (Note: The July 28, 2005, concert was a part of Vilar de Mouros Festival.) | Porto | Portugal | Vilar de Mouros | —N/a |
| August 4, 2005 (Note: The August 4, 2005, concert was a part of Wacken Open Air.) | Wacken | Germany | Hauptstrasse | —N/a |
| August 5, 2005 | Dresden | Germany | Großer Garten | —N/a |
| August 7, 2005 (Note: The August 7, 2005, concert was a part of Ankkarock.) | Vantaa | Finland | Korson Urheilupuisto | —N/a |
| August 14, 2005 (Note: The August 14, 2005, concert was a part of Taubertal Open Air.) | Rothenburg | Germany | Eisweise | —N/a |
| August 19, 2005 (Note: The August 19, 2005, concert was a part of Pukkelpop.) | Hasselt | Belgium | Domein Kiewit | —N/a |
| August 20, 2005 (Note: The August 20, 2005, concert was a part of Lowlands Festival.) | Biddinghuizen | Netherlands | Evenemententerrein Walibi | —N/a |
| September 3, 2005 | Hell | Norway | Hellodrome | Stonegard |
| September 5, 2005 | Oslo | Norway | Rockefeller Music Hall | —N/a |
| September 8, 2005 | Stockholm | Sweden | Arenan | —N/a |
| September 9, 2005 | Gothenburg | Sweden | Lisebergshallen | Nocturnal Rites |
| September 11, 2005 | Umeå | Sweden | SkyCom Arena | —N/a |
| September 17, 2005 | Žilina | Slovakia | Boräk Hall | —N/a |
| September 19, 2005 | Ljubljana | Slovenia | Krizance Hall | —N/a |
| September 23, 2005 | Copenhagen | Denmark | K.B. Hallen | —N/a |
| September 25, 2005 | London | England | Hammersmith Apollo | Paradise Lost |
| September 30, 2005 | Bucharest | Romania | Polivalenta Hall | —N/a |
| October 1, 2005 | Athens | Greece | Lycabettus Amphitheatre | —N/a |
| October 8, 2005 (Note: The October 8, 12 and 15, 2005, concerts were a part of Live'N'Louder Festival.) | Mexico City | Mexico | Palacio de los Deportes | —N/a |
| October 12, 2005 | São Paulo | Brazil | Estádio do Canindé | —N/a |
| October 15, 2005 | Porto Alegre | Brazil | Gigantinho | —N/a |
| October 21, 2005 | Helsinki | Finland | Hartwall Areena | Sonata Arctica |

== Personnel ==
- Tarja Turunen – lead vocals
- Tuomas Holopainen – keyboards
- Emppu Vuorinen – guitar
- Jukka Nevalainen – drums
- Marko Hietala – bass, vocals

Additional musicians

- John Two-Hawks – vocals, flute
