= Dark Passion Play World Tour =

2007–2009 concert tour by Nightwish

- Tour by Nightwish
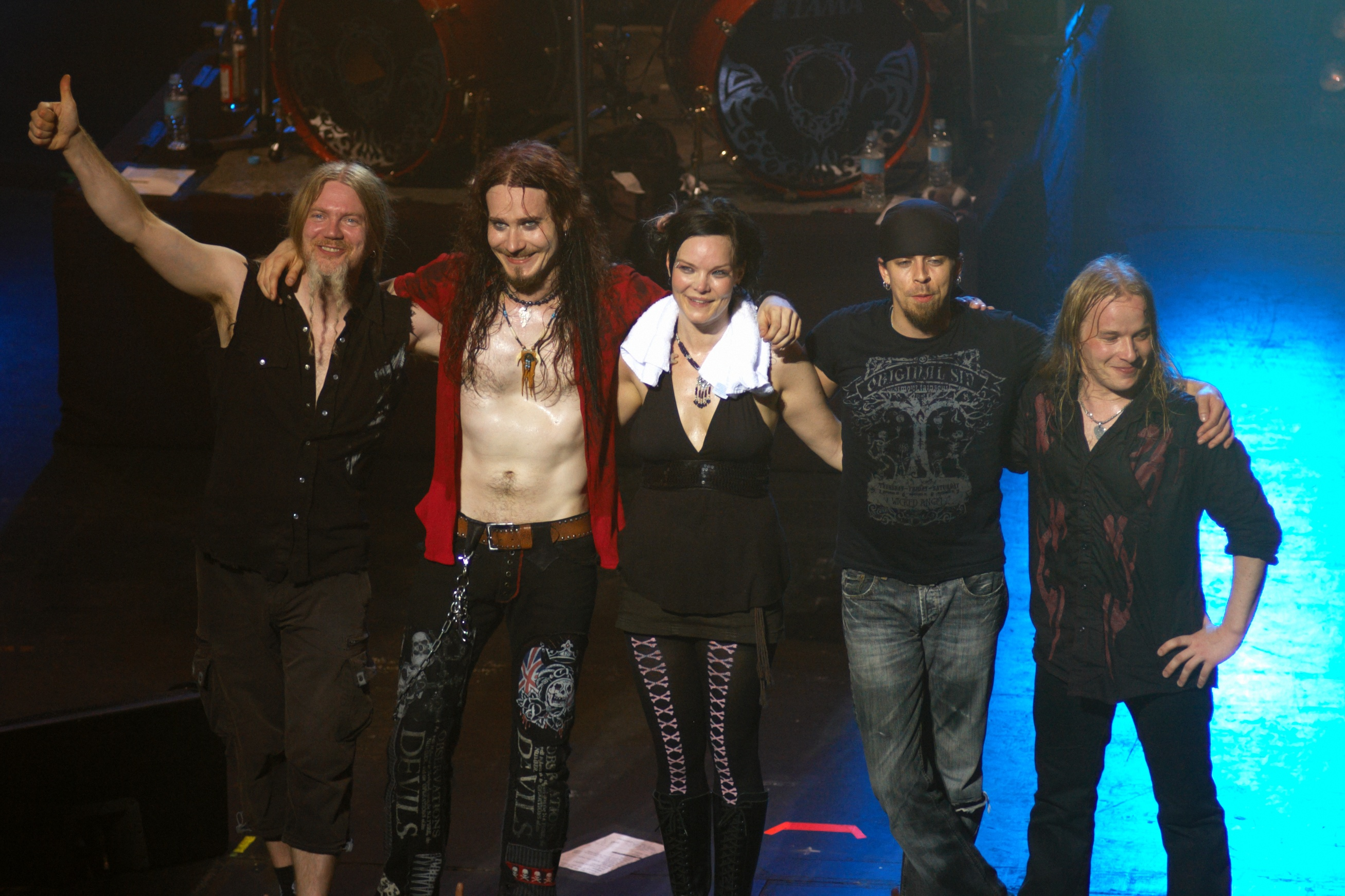
- The band live in Melbourne, Australia, on January 30, 2008
- Location: Asia; Europe; North America; Oceania; South America
- Associated album: Dark Passion Play
- Start date: October 6, 2007
- End date: September 19, 2009
- Legs: 3
- No. of shows: 194

Nightwish concert chronology
- Once Upon a Tour (2004–2005); Dark Passion Play World Tour (2007–2009); Imaginaerum World Tour (2012–2013)

The Dark Passion Play World Tour was a concert tour by the Finnish symphonic metal band Nightwish, taking place from 2007 to 2009 in support of their sixth studio album, Dark Passion Play, released by Nuclear Blast on September 26, 2007; it was the first tour with then-new frontwoman Anette Olzon, who joined the band in 2006, after Tarja Turunen's dismissal on October 21, 2005. During this tour, the band played for the first time in Israel, China, Hong Kong, Lithuania, Luxembourg, Republic of Ireland, Serbia and Croatia.

On September 22, 2007, the band hosted a secret concert at Rock Café in Tallinn, Estonia, disguising itself as a Nightwish cover band called "Nachtwasser". Their first official concert with the new singer was in Tel Aviv, Israel on October 6, 2007. The tour thus started, visiting the United States, Canada, most of Europe, Asia, and Australia. In 2008, the band played over 100 shows, with concerts in Oceania, Europe and Asia. In November, the band played in South America, and later took a three-month break; Nightwish started the third leg in 2009, with dates in North America and Europe, and also attended various summer festivals, including Graspop Metal Meeting and Masters of Rock. The last show was played at Helsinki Hartwall Areena, with an attendance of 11,000 people.

For their Once album, Nightwish had planned to give a grand concert in London with a live orchestra, as the progressive metal band Dream Theater had done on what later would be their Score album, and this project is still in the works. In an interview in December 2007, Holopainen said that they have been planning the concert and that this was something he really wanted to do, but that the locale they needed was already booked for two years in advance. The show was never played though, but according to Holopainen it is still in the future plans for other tours.

== Set list ==
Sample set list

1. "Bye Bye Beautiful"
2. "Cadence of Her Last Breath"
3. "Dark Chest of Wonders"
4. "The Siren"
5. "Whoever Brings the Night"
6. "Amaranth"
7. "The Islander"
8. "Last of the Wilds"
9. "The Poet and the Pendulum"
10. "Ever Dream"
11. "Dead to the World"
12. "While Your Lips Are Still Red"
13. "Sahara"
14. "Nemo"
15. "7 Days to the Wolves"
16. "Wishmaster"
17. "Wish I Had an Angel"

=== Notes ===
Dispelling the rumours that Anette Olzon would never be capable of performing old Nightwish hit songs, the band used a set list containing songs from all their album, except for Angels Fall First and the Over the Hills and Far Away EP. He was not afraid that Olzon would not be able to perform the songs that Turunen usually sang, because even on her demo she showed her ability performing for example "Ever Dream" and "Higher Than Hope", but he has confirmed that "The Phantom of the Opera", "Passion and the Opera" and "Stargazers" would not be performed again, as those went beyond Olzon's non-operatic vocal style. Despite this, the former and the latter were brought back when Floor Jansen joined the band in 2012.

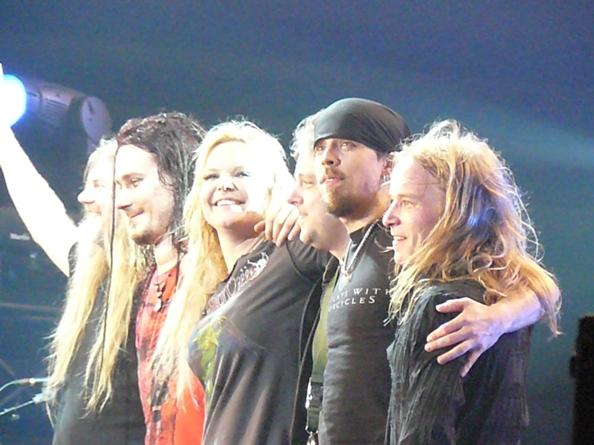
The band ending a concert in Mantua, Italy, on March 30, 2009

The ballad "Eva" was performed only a few times in the tour, as well as "Sleeping Sun", while "Cadence of Her Last Breath" and "She Is My Sin" haven't been performed since the 2008 concerts in Australia. During the 2008 European leg, "Slaying the Dreamer" and "She Is My Sin" were performed in selected dates while "Dead to the World" and "The Siren" were included in the usual set list, remaining until the end of the tour. During this European leg, the Irish musician Troy Donockley joined the band on stage to play Uilleann pipes on "The Islander" and "Last of the Wilds", and the native-American singer John Two-Hawks joined the band in a few dates to sing and play flute on "Stone People" and "Creek Mary's Blood". Also during the European leg the band started to play a version of Megadeth's Symphony of Destruction, occasionally replaced by the original "While Your Lips Are Still Red", both featuring Marko Hietala on led vocals. In the second North American leg in 2008 the band brought back their "Come Cover Me" song, played until the end of the Latin American tour in November.

Some old songs like "Dead Boy's Poem", "Romanticide" and "Ghost Love Score" have only been performed by the band since in the 2009 tour dates, starting in London's Brixton Academy on March 11, and Olzon has performed "Kuolema tekee taiteilijan" without the support of the band during a festival in Sweden. Holopainen has also revealed that the band rehearsed Elvenpath with Olzon, but that the song "didn't work" well enough to be performed live. The final concert at Hartwall Areena in Helsinki featured the previously never performed song "Meadows of Heaven", also including an acoustic version of "Walking in the Air" and the unreleased cover of "The Heart Asks Pleasure First" recorded for Dark Passion Play was also played while the band left the stage.

== Tour dates ==
List of 2007 concerts, showing date, city, country, venue and support act(s)
Date	City	Country	Venue	Support Act(s)
September 22, 2007	Tallinn	Estonia	Rock Café	—N/a
September 26, 2007	Helsinki	Finland	Tavastia Club	—N/a
September 28, 2007	Hamburg	Germany	Delphi-Showpalast	—N/a
October 6, 2007	Tel Aviv	Israel	Hangar 11	—N/a
October 15, 2007	Springfield	United States	Jaxx Club	Paradise Lost
October 16, 2007	Philadelphia	United States	Trocadero Theatre	Paradise Lost
October 18, 2007	New York City	United States	Nokia Theatre	Paradise Lost
October 20, 2007	Worcester	United States	Palladium	Paradise Lost
October 21, 2007	Montreal	Canada	Metropolis	Paradise Lost
October 23, 2007	Toronto	Canada	Sound Academy	Paradise Lost
October 24, 2007	Cleveland	United States	Peabody's Club	Paradise Lost
October 26, 2007	Detroit	United States	Harpos Concert Theatre	Paradise Lost
October 27, 2007	Chicago	United States	House of Blues	Paradise Lost
October 28, 2007	Minneapolis	United States	First Avenue	Paradise Lost
October 31, 2007	Seattle	United States	The Showbox	Paradise Lost
November 1, 2007	Portland	United States	Roseland Theater	Paradise Lost
November 2, 2007	San Francisco	United States	Slim's Club	Paradise Lost
November 4, 2007	Los Angeles	United States	House of Blues	Paradise Lost
November 6, 2007	Santa Ana	United States	Galaxy Theatre	Paradise Lost
November 7, 2007	Phoenix	United States	Marquee Theatre	Paradise Lost
November 8, 2007	Albuquerque	United States	Sunshine Theatre	Paradise Lost
November 10, 2007	San Antonio	United States	White Rabbit Club	Paradise Lost
November 11, 2007	Dallas	United States	Palladium Ballroom	Paradise Lost
November 12, 2007	Houston	United States	Meridian Club	Paradise Lost
November 14, 2007	Fort Lauderdale	United States	Culture Room	Paradise Lost
November 15, 2007	Orlando	United States	Firestone Club	Paradise Lost
November 17, 2007	Atlanta	United States	Masquerade Club	Paradise Lost
November 28, 2007	Copenhagen	Denmark	K.B. Hallen	Indica
November 30, 2007	Gothemburg	Sweden	Lisebergshallen	Indica
December 1, 2007	Oslo	Norway	Sentrum Scene	Indica
December 2, 2007	Oslo	Norway	Sentrum Scene	Indica
December 4, 2007	Stockholm	Sweden	Arenan	Indica
December 5, 2007	Umeå	Sweden	SkyCom Arena	Indica
December 8, 2007	Levi	Finland	Hullu Poro Areena	Indica
December 9, 2007	Levi	Finland	Hullu Poro Areena	Indica
December 11, 2007	Oulu	Finland	Teatria 25	Indica
December 12, 2007	Joensuu	Finland	Areena	Indica
December 14, 2007	Jyväskylä	Finland	Paviljönki Areena	Indica
December 15, 2007	Tampere	Finland	Ice-Hall	Indica
December 16, 2007	Turku	Finland	Karibia Center	Indica
December 28, 2007 (Note: The December 28, 2007, concert were a part of On a Dark Winter's Night Festival.)	Salzburg	Austria	Salzburgarena	—N/a
December 29, 2007	Oberhausen	Germany	König-Pilsener-Arena	—N/a

List of 2008 concerts, showing date, city, country, venue and support act(s)
Date	City	Country	Venue	Support Act(s)
January 1, 2008	Helsinki	Finland	Ice Hall	Indica
January 17, 2008	Osaka	Japan	Big Cat Club	—N/a
January 18, 2008	Tokyo	Japan	Ebisu Liquid Hall	—N/a
January 21, 2008	Beijing	China	MG Live House	Skylark
January 23, 2008	Shanghai	China	Hongkou Coliseum	Skylark
January 24, 2008	Hong Kong		HITEC 2	Skylark
January 27, 2008	Perth	Australia	Metro Theatre	Voyager; Lord
January 29, 2008	Adelaide	Australia	HQ Club	Voyager; Lord
January 30, 2008	Melbourne	Australia	Palais Theatre	Voyager; Lord
February 1, 2008	Sydney	Australia	Enmore Theatre	Voyager; Lord
February 2, 2008	Brisbane	Australia	Tivoli Theatre	Voyager; Lord
February 17, 2008	Vilnius	Lithuania	Siemens Arena	Pain
February 19, 2008	Kraków	Poland	Wisla Hall	Pain
February 20, 2008	Prague	Czech Republic	T-Mobile Arena	Pain
February 21, 2008	Berlin	Germany	Arena	Krieger; Pain
February 23, 2008	Leipzig	Germany	Leipzig Arena	Krieger; Pain
February 24, 2008	Stuttgart	Germany	Hanns-Martin-Schleyer-Halle	Krieger; Pain
February 25, 2008	Frankfurt	Germany	Jahrhunderthalle	Pain
February 27, 2008	Bamberg	Germany	Jako Arena	Pain
February 28, 2008	Vienna	Austria	Gasometer	Pain
February 29, 2008	Zürich	Switzerland	Hallenstadion	Pain
March 2, 2008	Milan	Italy	PalaLido Arena	Pain
March 4, 2008	Ljubljana	Slovenia	Tivoli Hall	Pain
March 5, 2008	Budapest	Hungary	JRC Ice-Hall	Pain
March 8, 2008 (Note: The March 8, 2008, concert was a part of March Metal Day.)	Athens	Greece	Olympic Fencing Arena	—N/a
March 17, 2008	Hamburg	Germany	Color Line Arena	Pain
March 18, 2008	Hanover	Germany	AWD Hall	Pain
March 19, 2008	Dortmund	Germany	Westfalenhalle	Pain
March 21, 2008	Amsterdam	Netherlands	Heineken Music Hall	Pain
March 22, 2008	Esch-sur-Alzette	Luxembourg	Rockhal	Pain
March 23, 2008	Antwerp	Belgium	Lotto Arena	Pain
March 25, 2008	London	England	London Astoria	Pain
March 26, 2008	London	England	London Astoria	Pain
March 27, 2008	London	England	London Astoria	Pain
March 29, 2008	Birmingham	England	O2 Academy	Pain
March 30, 2008	Newcastle upon Tyne	England	O2 Newcastle	Pain
March 31, 2008	Glasgow	Scotland	O2 Glasgow	Pain
April 2, 2008	Belfast	Northern Ireland	Mandela Hall	Pain
April 3, 2008	Dublin	Ireland	Vicar Street	Pain
April 4, 2008	Manchester	England	Apollo Theatre	Pain
April 6, 2008	Paris	France	Le Zénith	Pain
April 7, 2008	Strasbourg	France	Zénith de Strasbourg	Pain
April 10, 2008	Lyon	France	Halle Tony Garnier	Pain
April 11, 2008	Marseille	France	Lê Dôme	Pain
April 12, 2008	Toulouse	France	Le Zénith	Pain
April 14, 2008	Barcelona	Spain	Razzmatazz 1	Pain
April 15, 2008	Bilbao	Spain	Santana 27	Pain
April 16, 2008	Madrid	Spain	La Riviera	Pain
April 18, 2008	Porto	Portugal	Coliseu do Porto	Pain
April 19, 2008	Lisbon	Portugal	Coliseu dos Recreios	Pain
May 2, 2008	Mexico City	Mexico	Vive Cuervo Salon	—N/a
May 3, 2008	Mexico City	Mexico	Vive Cuervo Salon	—N/a
May 7, 2008	Poughkeepsie	United States	Chance Theatre	Sonic Syndicate; Iced Earth
May 9, 2008	Quebec City	Canada	Centre de Foire	Sonic Syndicate; Iced Earth
May 11, 2008	London	Canada	Cowboy's Club	Sonic Syndicate; Iced Earth
May 14, 2008	Winnipeg	Canada	Garrick Centre	Sonic Syndicate; Iced Earth
May 15, 2008	Regina	Canada	Drink Club	Sonic Syndicate; Iced Earth
May 16, 2008	Edmonton	Canada	Starlite Room	Sonic Syndicate; Iced Earth
May 17, 2008	Calgary	Canada	MacEwan Hall	Sonic Syndicate; Iced Earth
May 19, 2008	Victoria	Canada	Sugar Club	Sonic Syndicate; Iced Earth
May 20, 2008	Vancouver	Canada	Croatian Cultural Centre	Sonic Syndicate; Iced Earth
May 22, 2008	Orangevale	United States	Boardwalk Club	Sonic Syndicate; Iced Earth
May 23, 2008	San Diego	United States	House of Blues	Sonic Syndicate; Iced Earth
May 23, 2008	Las Vegas	United States	House of Blues	Sonic Syndicate; Iced Earth
May 26, 2008	Denver	United States	Ogden Theatre	Sonic Syndicate; Iced Earth
May 27, 2008	Lawrence	United States	Granada Theater	Sonic Syndicate; Iced Earth
May 28, 2008	Sauget	United States	Pop's Club	Sonic Syndicate; Iced Earth
May 30, 2008	Louisville	United States	Headliner's Hall	Sonic Syndicate; Iced Earth
May 31, 2008	Mokena	United States	The Pearl Room	Sonic Syndicate; Iced Earth
June 7, 2008 (Note: The June 7, 2008, concert was a part of Rock am Ring.)	Nürburg	Germany	Nürburgring	—N/a
June 8, 2008 (Note: The June 8, 2008, concert was a part of Rock im Park.)	Nuremberg	Germany	Zeppelinfeld	—N/a
June 26, 2008	Helsinki	Finland	Kaisaniemi Park	—N/a
June 28, 2008 (Note: The June 28, 2008, concert was a part of Metaltown Festival.)	Gothenburg	Sweden	Frihamnspiren	—N/a
July 4, 2008 (Note: The July 4, 2008, concert was a part of Ruisrock.)	Turku	Finland	Ruissalo	—N/a
July 6, 2008 (Note: The July 6, 2008, concert was a part of Rock Werchter.)	Werchter	Belgium	Festivalpark	—N/a
July 8, 2008 (Note: The July 8, 2008, concert was a part of Exit Festival.)	Novi Sad	Serbia	Petrovaradin	—N/a
July 13, 2008 (Note: The July 13, 2008, concert was a part of Ilosaarirock.)	Joensuu	Finland	Laulurinne	—N/a
July 26, 2008 (Note: The July 26, 2008, concert was a part of Lorca Rock.)	Lorca	Spain	Huerto de la Rueda	—N/a
August 2, 2008 (Note: The August 2, 2008, concert was a part of Wacken Open Air.)	Wacken	Germany	Hauptstrasse	—N/a
August 7, 2008 (Note: The August 7, 2008, concert was a part of Skanderborg Festival.)	Skanderborg	Denmark	Veljekset Keskinen	—N/a
August 9, 2008 (Note: The August 9, 2008, concert was a part of Miljoona Rock.)	Tuuri	Finland	Veljekset Keskinen Oy	—N/a
August 13, 2008 (Note: The August 13, 2008, concert was a part of Foire aux Vins.)	Colmar	France	Théâtre de Plein Air	—N/a
August 15, 2008 (Note: The August 15, 2008, concert was a part of Gampel Open Air.)	Gampel	Switzerland	Festivalgelände Am Rotten	—N/a
August 16, 2008 (Note: The August 16, 2008, concert was a part of Lowlands Festival.)	Biddinghuizen	Netherlands	Evenemententerrein Walibi Holland	—N/a
August 17, 2008 (Note: The August 17, 2008, concert was a part of Bloodstock Open Air.)	Derby	England	Catton Hall	—N/a
August 29, 2008	Philadelphia	United States	Trocadero Theatre	Sonata Arctica
August 30, 2008	Worcester	United States	Palladium	Sonata Arctica
September 1, 2008	Montreal	Canada	Metropolis	Sonata Arctica
September 2, 2008	Toronto	Canada	Polson Pier	Sonata Arctica
September 4, 2008	Cleveland	United States	Agora Theatre	Sonata Arctica
September 5, 2008	Detroit	United States	Harpos Concert Theatre	Sonata Arctica
September 6, 2008	Chicago	United States	House of Blues	Sonata Arctica
September 9, 2008	Seattle	United States	The Showbox	Sonata Arctica
September 10, 2008	Portland	United States	Roseland Theatre	Sonata Arctica
September 12, 2008	San Francisco	United States	The Fillmore	Sonata Arctica
September 13, 2008	Los Angeles	United States	Wiltern Theatre	Sonata Arctica
September 14, 2008	Phoenix	United States	Marquee Theatre	Sonata Arctica
September 16, 2008	Dallas	United States	Palladium Ballroom	Sonata Arctica
September 17, 2008	Austin	United States	La Zona Rosa	Sonata Arctica
September 20, 2008	New Orleans	United States	House of Blues	Sonata Arctica
September 21, 2008	St. Petersburg	United States	Jannus Landing	Sonata Arctica
November 5, 2008	Curitiba	Brazil	Master Hall	Semblant
November 7, 2008	São Paulo	Brazil	Via Funchal	Libra
November 8, 2008	São Paulo	Brazil	Via Funchal	Libra
November 10, 2008	Belo Horizonte	Brazil	Chevrolet Hall	Pleiades
November 11, 2008	Brasília	Brazil	Clube AABB	Pleiades
November 13, 2008	Manaus	Brazil	Amadeu Teixeira Arena	Ashes Cendes
November 15, 2008	Fortaleza	Brazil	Arena	—N/a
November 16, 2008	Recife	Brazil	Clube Português	—N/a
November 18, 2008	Vila Velha	Brazil	Ginásio Marista	—N/a
November 19, 2008	Rio de Janeiro	Brazil	Circo Voador	Libra
November 21, 2008	Buenos Aires	Argentina	Obras Arena	Haxan
November 23, 2008	Santiago	Chile	Teatro Caupolican	—N/a

List of 2009 concerts, showing date, city, country, venue and support act(s)
Date	City	Country	Venue	Support Act(s)
March 11, 2009	London	England	O2 Academy Brixton	Pain; Indica
March 14, 2009	Brussels	Belgium	Forest National	Pain; Indica
March 15, 2009	Rotterdam	Netherlands	Ahoy Arena	Pain; Indica
March 17, 2009	Cologne	Germany	Palladium	Pain; Indica
March 18, 2009	Lingen	Germany	Emslandhallen	Pain; Indica
March 20, 2009	Karlsruhe	Germany	Europahalle	Pain; Indica
March 21, 2009	Erfurt	Germany	Messehalle	Pain; Indica
March 23, 2009	Paris	France	Le Zénith	Pain; Indica
March 24, 2009	Paris	France	Le Zénith	Pain; Indica
March 26, 2009	Munich	Germany	Zenith	Pain; Indica
March 28, 2009	Basel	Switzerland	St. Jakobshalle	Pain; Indica
March 30, 2009	Mantua	Italy	Palabam Arena	Pain; Indica
March 31, 2009	Pordenone	Italy	Palasport	Pain; Indica
April 2, 2009	Zagreb	Croatia	Cibona Hall	Pain; Indica
April 4, 2009	Debrecen	Hungary	Főnix Hall	Pain; Indica
May 1, 2009	Hartford	United States	Webster Theater	Volbeat
May 2, 2009	New York City	United States	Nokia Theatre	Volbeat
May 3, 2009	Allentown	United States	Crocodile Rock Club	Volbeat
May 5, 2009	Baltimore	United States	Sonar Club	Volbeat
May 6, 2009	Louisville	United States	Oasis Club	Volbeat
May 8, 2009	Sauget	United States	Pop's Club	Volbeat
May 9, 2009	Oklahoma City	United States	Diamond Ballroom	Volbeat
May 11, 2009	Corpus Christi	United States	Concrete Street Pavilion	Volbeat
May 12, 2009	Houston	United States	Warehouse Live	Volbeat
May 14, 2009	Atlanta	United States	Masquerade Club	Volbeat
June 7, 2009 (Note: The June 7, 2009, concert was a part of Sauna Open Air.)	Tampere	Finland	Eteläpuisto	—N/a
June 12, 2009 (Note: The June 12, 2009 concert was a part of Greenfield Festival.)	Interlaken	Switzerland	Interlaken Air Base	—N/a
June 18, 2009 (Note: The June 18, 2009, concert was a part of RMJ Party Camp.)	Pori	Finland	Kirjurinluoto	—N/a
June 28, 2009 (Note: The June 28, 2009, concert was a part of Graspop Metal Meeting.)	Dessel	Belgium	Festivalterrein Stenehei	—N/a
July 3, 2009 (Note: The July 3, 2009, concert was a part of Metalcamp.)	Tolmin	Slovenia	Festival Grounds	—N/a
July 9, 2009 (Note: The July 9, 2009, concert was a part of Masters of Rock.)	Vizovice	Czech Republic	Areál likérky R. Jelínek	—N/a
July 11, 2009 (Note: The July 11, 2009, concert was a part of Kvinesdal Rock Festival.)	Kvinesdal	Norway	Øyesletta	—N/a
July 18, 2009 (Note: The July 18, 2009, concert was a part of Artmania Festival.)	Sibiu	Romania	Piața Mare	—N/a
July 24, 2009 (Note: The July 24, 2009, concert was a part of Race & Rock Festival.)	Seinäjoki	Finland	Seinäjoen Vauhtiajot	—N/a
August 8, 2009 (Note: The August 8, 2009, concert was a part of M'era Luna Festival.)	Hildesheim	Germany	Flugplatz Hildesheim-Drispenstedt	—N/a
August 15, 2009	Savonlinna	Finland	Olavinlinna Castle	—N/a
August 16, 2009	Savonlinna	Finland	Olavinlinna Castle	—N/a
September 5, 2009	Moscow	Russia	Luzhniki Palace of Sports	Pain
September 19, 2009	Helsinki	Finland	Hartwall Arena	Apocalyptica

Cancelled dates

Date	City	Country	Venue
November 6, 2007	Anaheim	United States	House of Blues
May 5, 2008	Sayreville	United States	Starland Ballroom
May 6, 2008	Hartford	United States	Webster Theater
September 19, 2008	Houston	United States	Meridian Theatre
September 23, 2008	Knoxville	United States	Valarium Club
September 27, 2008	New York City	United States	Nokia Theatre
September 28, 2008	Baltimore	United States	Rams Head Live!
September 29, 2008	Charlotte	United States	Tremont Hall
October 11, 2008	Moscow	Russia	Luzhniki Hall
October 25, 2008	Reykjavík	Iceland	Laugardalshöll
November 4, 2008	Porto Alegre	Brazil	Pepsi On Stage

== Personnel ==
- Anette Olzon – female vocals
- Tuomas Holopainen – keyboards
- Emppu Vuorinen – guitars
- Jukka Nevalainen – drums
- Marko Hietala – bass, male vocals

Guest musicians

- Troy Donockley – bagpipes (UK and 2009 shows)
- John Two-Hawks – male vocals and flute (shows in Louisville, Mokena and Sauget)
- Pekka Kuusisto – violin (Hartwall Areena only)
