= List of Highest Hopes editions =

Highest Hopes - The Best of Nightwish is the third compilation album by the symphonic power metal quintet Nightwish. Their first, Tales from the Elvenpath, was considered incomplete by many fans as it contains only tracks from Oceanborn, Over the Hills and Far Away, Wishmaster and Century Child, leaving out Angels Fall First and missing the later released Once. This compilation, though, contains songs from all previously released Nightwish albums, plus a cover of Pink Floyd's "High Hopes" (live version on the limited edition).

It already sold more than 100,000 copies in Finland.

== Track listing ==
=== Standard version ===
1. "Wish I Had an Angel"
2. "Stargazers"
3. "The Kinslayer"
4. "Ever Dream"
5. "Elvenpath"
6. "Bless the Child"
7. "Nemo"
8. "Sleeping Sun (2005 version)
9. "Dead to the World"
10. "Over the Hills and Far Away" (Gary Moore cover)
11. "Deep Silent Complete"
12. "Sacrament of Wilderness"
13. "Walking in the Air"
14. "Wishmaster"
15. "Dead Boy's Poem"
16. "High Hopes (Live)" (Pink Floyd cover)

=== Special edition ===
==== CD ====
1. "Wish I Had an Angel"
2. "Stargazers"
3. "The Kinslayer"
4. "Ever Dream"
5. "Elvenpath"
6. "Bless the Child"
7. "Nemo"
8. "Sleeping Sun" (2005 version)
9. "Dead to the World"
10. "Over the Hills and Far Away"
11. "Sacrament of Wilderness"
12. "Walking in the Air"
13. "Wishmaster"
14. "Dead Boy's Poem"
15. "The Phantom of The Opera"
16. "High Hopes (Live)"

==== DVD ====
1. "She Is My Sin" - Live at M'Era Luna
2. "The Kinslayer" - Live at M'Era Luna
3. "Dead to the World" - Live at M'Era Luna

=== Extended version ===
==== Disc 1 ====
1. "Wish I Had an Angel"
2. "Stargazers"
3. "The Kinslayer"
4. "Ever Dream"
5. "Elvenpath"
6. "Bless the Child"
7. "Nemo"
8. "Sleeping Sun" (2005 version)
9. "Dead to the World"
10. "Over the Hills and Far Away"
11. "Deep Silent Complete"
12. "Sacrament of Wilderness"
13. "Walking in the Air"
14. "Wishmaster"
15. "Dead Boy's Poem"
16. "High Hopes (Live)"

==== Disc 2 ====
1. "The Wayfarer"
2. "Come Cover Me (Live)"
3. "Dead Boy's Poem (Live)"
4. "Once Upon a Troubadour"
5. "A Return to the Sea"
6. "Sleepwalker - Heavy Version"
7. "Nightquest"
8. "Lagoon"

==== DVD ====
1. "She Is My Sin - Live at the M'era Luna Festival in Hildesheim, Germany in 2003"
2. "Dead to the World - Live at the M'era Luna Festival in Hildesheim, Germany in 2003"
3. "The Kinslayer - Live at the M'era Luna Festival in Hildesheim, Germany in 2003"
4. "Over the Hills and Far Away (Video)"
5. "Bless the Child (Video)"
6. "Sleeping Sun" (1998 video)
7. "Walking in the Air - Live in Tampere in Finland in 2000"
8. "End of All Hope - Live at the Summer Breeze Festival in Germany in 2002"
9. "10th Man Down - Live at the Summer Breeze Festival in Germany in 2002"
10. "Sleeping Sun - Live at the Summer Breeze Festival in Germany in 2002"
