= End of an Era (album) =

Video by Nightwish
- Released: 1 June 2006
- Recorded: 21 October 2005
- Venues: Hartwall Arena (Helsinki, Finland)
- Length: 103:10
- Label: Nuclear Blast
- Producers: Tero Kinnunen; Tuomas Holopainen; Marko Hietala

Nightwish live album chronology
| From Wishes to Eternity (2001) | End of an Era (2006) | Made in Hong Kong (And in Various Other Places) (2009) |

Professional ratings
Review scores
| Source | Rating |
|---|---|
| AllMusic | 4/5 stars |
| Ultimate Guitar | 8/10 stars |

End of an Era is a DVD and double CD from the Finnish symphonic metal band Nightwish. Nuclear Blast recorded their live performance at the Hartwall Arena in Helsinki, Finland, on 21 October 2005, the final concert of a long worldwide tour for their album Once. During the concert the band was joined on-stage by John Two-Hawks, who performed "Stone People" from his album Honor as an introduction to "Creek Mary's Blood", which featured his voice and cedar flutes. End of an Era is the final Nightwish production to feature Tarja Turunen on vocals. She was dismissed by a letter after this concert.

In addition to original Nightwish songs, three significant covers appear, their known cover of Gary Moore's "Over the Hills and Far Away", Andrew Lloyd Webber's "The Phantom of the Opera", and a cover of Pink Floyd's "High Hopes".

The running time of the concert is 1 hour and 43 minutes. The DVD also contains a 55-minute documentary about the fifteen days prior to the concert, A Day Before Tomorrow, and a photo gallery.

The Blu-ray Disc version was released on 29 May 2009.

== Track listing ==
DVD edition
| No. | Title | Lyrics | Music | Length |
|---|---|---|---|---|
| 1. | "Red Warrior" (Intro from The Last Samurai soundtrack) / "Dark Chest of Wonders" | Tuomas Holopainen | Intro: Hans Zimmer / Holopainen | 5:08 |
| 2. | "Planet Hell" | Holopainen | Holopainen | 4:45 |
| 3. | "Ever Dream" | Holopainen | Holopainen | 4:45 |
| 4. | "The Kinslayer" | Holopainen | Holopainen | 4:09 |
| 5. | "The Phantom of the Opera" (Andrew Lloyd Webber cover) | Charles Hart · Richard Stilgoe | Andrew Lloyd Webber | 5:12 |
| 6. | "The Siren" | Holopainen | Holopainen · Emppu Vuorinen | 4:53 |
| 7. | "Sleeping Sun" | Holopainen | Holopainen | 4:55 |
| 8. | "High Hopes" (Pink Floyd cover) | David Gilmour · Polly Samson | Gilmour | 6:54 |
| 9. | "Bless the Child" | Holopainen | Holopainen | 6:25 |
| 10. | "Wishmaster" (Including the intro to "The Trooper" by Iron Maiden) | Holopainen | Holopainen | 4:44 |
| 11. | "Slaying the Dreamer" | Holopainen | Holopainen · Vuorinen | 4:44 |
| 12. | "Kuolema Tekee Taiteilijan" | Holopainen | Holopainen | 4:13 |
| 13. | "Nemo" | Holopainen | Holopainen | 4:46 |
| 14. | "Ghost Love Score" | Holopainen | Holopainen | 10:29 |
| 15. | "Stone People" (Performed by John Two-Hawks) | John Two-Hawks | Two-Hawks | 4:09 |
| 16. | "Creek Mary's Blood" (feat. John Two-Hawks) | Holopainen | Holopainen | 8:39 |
| 17. | "Over the Hills and Far Away" (Gary Moore cover) | Gary Moore | Moore | 5:26 |
| 18. | "Wish I Had an Angel" / "All of Them" (Outro from the King Arthur soundtrack) | Holopainen | Holopainen / Outro: Zimmer | 7:52 |

CD edition disc 1
| No. | Title | Lyrics | Music | Length |
|---|---|---|---|---|
| 1. | "Red Warrior" (Intro from The Last Samurai soundtrack) / "Dark Chest of Wonders" | Tuomas Holopainen | Intro: Hans Zimmer / Holopainen | 5:08 |
| 2. | "Planet Hell" | Holopainen | Holopainen | 4:45 |
| 3. | "Ever Dream" | Holopainen | Holopainen | 4:45 |
| 4. | "The Kinslayer" | Holopainen | Holopainen | 4:09 |
| 5. | "The Phantom of the Opera" (Andrew Lloyd Webber cover) | Charles Hart · Richard Stilgoe | Andrew Lloyd Webber | 5:12 |
| 6. | "The Siren" | Holopainen | Holopainen · Emppu Vuorinen | 4:53 |
| 7. | "Sleeping Sun" | Holopainen | Holopainen | 4:55 |
| 8. | "High Hopes" (Pink Floyd cover) | David Gilmour · Polly Samson | Gilmour | 6:54 |
| 9. | "Bless the Child" | Holopainen | Holopainen | 6:25 |
| 10. | "Wishmaster" (Including the intro to "The Trooper" by Iron Maiden) | Holopainen | Holopainen | 4:44 |

CD edition disc 2
| No. | Title | Lyrics | Music | Length |
|---|---|---|---|---|
| 1. | "Slaying the Dreamer" | Holopainen | Holopainen · Vuorinen | 4:44 |
| 2. | "Kuolema Tekee Taiteilijan" | Holopainen | Holopainen | 4:13 |
| 3. | "Nemo" | Holopainen | Holopainen | 4:46 |
| 4. | "Ghost Love Score" | Holopainen | Holopainen | 10:29 |
| 5. | "Stone People" (Performed by John Two-Hawks) | John Two-Hawks | Two-Hawks | 4:09 |
| 6. | "Creek Mary's Blood" (feat. John Two-Hawks) | Holopainen | Holopainen | 8:39 |
| 7. | "Over the Hills and Far Away" (Gary Moore cover) | Gary Moore | Moore | 5:26 |
| 8. | "Wish I Had an Angel" / "All of Them" (Outro from the King Arthur soundtrack) | Holopainen | Holopainen / Outro: Zimmer | 7:52 |

== Chart performance ==
The DVD was released on 1 June 2006 in Finland and on 2 June 2006 in Germany. After only one day on sale, the DVD was certified gold in Finland, and later sold platinum. End of an Era also was Platinum in Germany and Gold in France and on 2009 in Switzerland.

| Chart | Peak position |
|---|---|
| Austrian DVD Chart | 2 |
| Austrian Albums Chart | 41 |
| Belgian Ultratop 50 | 40 |
| Dutch DVD Chart | 3 |
| Finnish DVD Chart | 1 |
| Finnish Albums Chart | 6 |
| French CD+DVD Chart | 24 |
| German CD+DVD Chart | 3 |
| Hungarian DVD Chart | 1 |
| Norwegian Albums Chart | 35 |
| Japanese DVD Chart | 158 |
| Spanish DVD Chart | 2 |
| Swedish Albums Chart | 35 |
| Swiss CD+DVD Chart | 18 |
| UK Rock Chart | 7 |
| UK Indie Chart | 8 |
| UK DVD Chart | 115 |

=== Sales and certifications ===
| Country | Certification (sales thresholds) |
|---|---|
| Finland | Platinum |
| France | Gold |
| Germany | Platinum |
| Switzerland | Gold |
