= Highest Hopes: The Best of Nightwish =

Compilation album by Nightwish
- Released: 27 September 2005
- Recorded: 1997–2005
- Genre: Symphonic metal; power metal
- Length: 78:23
- Label: Spinefarm
- Producer: Tuomas Holopainen; Tero Kinnunen

Nightwish chronology
Bestwishes (2005)	Highest Hopes: The Best of Nightwish (2005)	The Sound of Nightwish Reborn (2008)

Singles from Highest Hopes
- 1. "Sleeping Sun" Released: 19 October 2005

Professional ratings
Review scores
Source	Rating
Allmusic	4.5/5 stars
Bergensavisen	4/6 stars

Highest Hopes: The Best of Nightwish is the fourth compilation album by the Finnish symphonic metal band Nightwish. Their first, Tales from the Elvenpath, was considered incomplete by many fans as it contains only tracks from Oceanborn, Over the Hills and Far Away, Wishmaster and Century Child, leaving out Angels Fall First. This compilation, though, contains songs from all previously released Nightwish albums, plus a live cover of Pink Floyd's "High Hopes".

Highest Hopes was released in three different formats: Standard, Special Edition and Extended 2 CD. In addition to the normal version, a special edition was released, omitting the song "Deep Silent Complete" and replacing it with the popular cover version of "The Phantom of the Opera" song. It also contains a bonus DVD containing three full songs filmed live at the M'era Luna Festival in Hildesheim, Germany in 2003.

The Extended Version is a 2-CD compilation with CD1 the same as the Standard Version plus a second CD of eight audio tracks from the Tarja Turunen period and includes a bonus DVD containing ten video tracks; Three full songs (tracks 1–3) filmed live at the M'era Luna Festival in Hildesheim, Germany in 2003 (identical to the Special Edition Bonus DVD but in an altered running order), three studio videos (tracks 4–6), one live recording (track 7) filmed at Pakkahuone in Tampere, Finland in 2000, and a further three full live songs (tracks 8–10) filmed live at the Summer Breeze Festival in Germany in 2002. All versions feature a new (2005) recording of the song "Sleeping Sun" and a live version of Pink Floyd's "High Hopes", from which this compilation takes its name.

The album was certified platinum in Finland – for sales exceeding 40,000 copies – the same day it was released, and also was gold in Norway with more than 20,000 sold copies. It was also Finland's best-selling album of 2005, having sold more than 65,000 copies, certified with double platinum. Today, it has sold more than 103,000 copies.

== Track listing ==
All lyrics are written by Tuomas Holopainen, except where noted; all music is composed by Holopainen, except where noted.

Highest Hopes track listing
No.	Title	Lyrics	Music	Original Album	Length
1.	"Wish I Had an Angel"			Once	4:03
2.	"Stargazers"			Oceanborn	4:26
3.	"The Kinslayer"			Wishmaster	3:59
4.	"Ever Dream"			Century Child	4:44
5.	"Elvenpath"			Angels Fall First	4:38
6.	"Bless the Child"			Century Child	6:12
7.	"Nemo"			Once	4:34
8.	"Sleeping Sun" (2005 version)			Highest Hopes (Non-album track)	4:24
9.	"Dead to the World"			Century Child	4:19
10.	"Over the Hills and Far Away" (Gary Moore cover)	Moore	Moore	Over the Hills and Far Away (EP) (Non-album track)	5:00
11.	"Deep Silent Complete"			Wishmaster	3:57
12.	"Sacrament of Wilderness"		Holopainen; Emppu Vuorinen	Oceanborn	4:09
13.	"Walking in the Air" (Howard Blake cover)	Blake	Blake	Oceanborn	5:27
14.	"Wishmaster"			Wishmaster	4:23
15.	"Dead Boy's Poem"			Wishmaster	6:48
16.	"High Hopes" (Pink Floyd cover; live)	Polly Anne Samson; David Gilmour	Gilmour	Highest Hopes (Non-album track)	7:20
Total length:					78:23

=== Sales and certifications ===
Country	Certification (sales thresholds)
Finland	5× Platinum

== Charts ==
Chart	Peak position
Austrian Albums Chart	13
Belgian Ultratop	51
Brazilian Hot 100	25
Czech Albums Chart	20
Danish Albums Chart	56
Dutch MegaCharts	41
Finnish Albums Chart	1
German Albums Chart	17
Greek Albums Chart	1
Japanese Albums Chart	235
Mexican Albums Chart	1
Norwegian Albums Chart	5
Polish Music Charts	32
Swedish Albums Chart	14
Swiss Top 100 Albums	10

== Credits ==
- Tarja Turunen - Lead vocals
- Tuomas Holopainen - Keyboards, spoken parts and backing vocals (on tracks 5 and 10)
- Emppu Vuorinen - Lead guitars
- Jukka Nevalainen - Drums
- Marko Hietala - Bass guitar and male vocals
- Sam Hardwick - Spoken parts (on track 6 and 15)
- Tony Kakko - Backing vocals (on track 10)
- London Philharmonic Orchestra - Choir (on track 1 and 7)
