= Planet Hell =

Song by Nightwish

from the album Once
- Released: 7 June 2004
- Recorded: 2003–2004
- Genre: Symphonic metal
- Length: 4:39
- Label: Spinefarm; Nuclear Blast
- Songwriter: Tuomas Holopainen
- Producers: Tuomas Holopainen; TeeCee Kinnunen

"Planet Hell" is a song by the Finnish symphonic metal band Nightwish, recorded for their fifth studio album Once. The song begins with a male choir and orchestral background music for a full minute before the band starts playing. "Planet Hell" also heavily features the vocals of the band's bass player Marko Hietala. After his departure from the band, the song's vocals have been taken over by their female vocalist Floor Jansen for live performances.

== Religious references ==
The song has a number of religious references:

- "The ferryman" refers to Charon the ferryman in Greek mythology. ("Save yourself a penny for the ferryman": tradition dictated that a dead Greek would have a coin placed in his mouth to pay for passage over the River Styx, as Charon demanded payment to ferry souls across the Styx, and without payment, souls would be forever trapped upon the shores, unable to cross.)
- "The Ark" could possibly refer to one of two things: The Ark of the Covenant, or Noah's Ark. The latter seems the most plausible, as in Biblical story the Ark saved Noah and the animals from the flood brought about by God for their sins. "This world ain't ready for the Ark" could indeed be a dark message from the band stating that the Earth is in midst of destruction by humans and we are all to blame, and deserve punishment.
- "Mother Gaia" refers to the Greek Titan Gaia or Mother Earth.

== In popular culture ==
- This song is well known amongst players of the fantasy massively multiplayer online role-playing game RuneScape. On 6 June 2006 a significant bug, which allowed some players to attack others in areas that were meant to be safe zones, was exploited in what became known as the Falador Massacre. Players were attacked and lost their valuable in-game items. The main record of the event was a player-made video which featured the song Planet Hell as the background music. On 6 June 2016 the game developers, Jagex, released an in-game event celebrating the ten-year anniversary of the Falador Massacre. It included background music similar to Planet Hell.
- This song was also used as intro music by the San Antonio Spurs in 2005.
- This song was sampled in Meek Mill's Pray For Em.
