= Tales from the Elvenpath =

Tales From The Elvenpath

Compilation album by Nightwish
- Released: 17 October 2004
- Genre: Power metal
- Length: 68:00
- Label: Drakkar Entertainment
- Producer: Tero Kinnunen

Nightwish compilation albums chronology
Wishmastour 2000 (2000)	Tales From The Elvenpath (2004)	Bestwishes (2005)

Tales from the Elvenpath is the second compilation album by the Finnish symphonic metal band Nightwish, released on 18 October 2004 by Drakkar Entertainment. Elvenpath is also the name of another Nightwish song, and although the compilation takes its name from that song, the song itself does not appear on the record, because that song is from the debut album, Angels Fall First, which was recorded with another record label.

Tales from the Elvenpath got Gold Disc in Finland, with 20.000 sold copies, and in Germany, with 100.000 sold copies.

== Track listing ==
All tracks are written by Tuomas Holopainen, except where noted.

Tales from the Elvenpath track listing
No.	Title	Writer(s)	Original album	Length
1.	"Wishmaster"		Wishmaster	4:23
2.	"Sacrament of Wilderness"	Holopainen; Emppu Vuorinen	Oceanborn	4:12
3.	"End of All Hope"		Century Child	3:54
4.	"Bless the Child"		Century Child	4:05
5.	"Sleeping Sun"		Oceanborn	4:01
6.	"She Is My Sin"		Wishmaster	4:46
7.	"Walking in the Air"	Holopainen; Howard Blake	Oceanborn	5:28
8.	"Stargazers"		Oceanborn	4:27
9.	"Over the Hills and Far Away"	Gary Moore	Over the Hills and Far Away	5:03
10.	"The Kinslayer"		Wishmaster	3:59
11.	"Dead Boy's Poem"		Wishmaster	6:47
12.	"Sleepwalker"		Wishmaster	3:10
13.	"Nightquest"		Oceanborn	4:17
14.	"Lagoon"		Century Child	3:46
15.	"The Wayfarer"		Century Child	3:25
Total length:				68:00

== Credits ==
- Tarja Turunen – lead vocals
- Tuomas Holopainen – keyboards
- Emppu Vuorinen – lead guitars
- Jukka Nevalainen – drums
- Marko Hietala – bass guitar
- Sami Vänskä – bass guitar (all tracks except 3, 4, 14 and 15)

== Charts ==
Chart (2011)	Peak position
Austrian Albums (Ö3 Austria)	19
German Albums (Offizielle Top 100)	7
Swiss Albums (Schweizer Hitparade)	12
