= The Matriarch =

- The Matriarch theatrical release poster (Finnish)
- Directed by: Markku Pölönen
- Written by: Markku Pölönen
- Produced by: Suomen Filmiteollisuus
- Starring: Peter Franzén; Sanna-Kaisa Palo; Samuli Vauramo; Jenni Banerjee; Heikki Kinnunen
- Cinematography: Jan Nyman
- Edited by: Markku Pölönen
- Music by: Vesa Mäkinen
- Release date: 14 September 2007
- Running time: 90 min
- Country: Finland
- Language: Finnish
- Budget: €1,400,000
- Box office: $667,849

The Matriarch (Finnish: Lieksa!) is a 2007 Finnish comedy-drama film written, directed and edited by Markku Pölönen and produced by the Pölönen-owned film production company Suomen Filmiteollisuus.

== Plot ==
Martta (Sanna-Kaisa Palo) and Otto (Heikki Kinnunen) are a pair of traveling tailors who claim to be bastard descendants of the Romanovs and wander from town to town in Finland seeking work, accompanied by their two half-witted adult sons, Hippo (Tuomas Uusitalo), Repe (Tatu Siivonen) and equally silly son-in-law Ventti (Toni Wahlström). The family occasionally turns to crime when they can't quite make ends meet, and the boys begin turning to violence with greater frequency when Otto weakens and Martta becomes the head of the family business. Their fortunes take an unexpected turn when the brothers assault and abduct a man they call Kasper (Samuli Vauramo), who becomes the family's sidekick in their travels. Despite Kasper's inability to speak, he attracts Martta's youngest daughter, an attractive young woman named Lara (Jenni Banerjee), but the family is in disarray when a long-lost half-brother, Laszlo (Peter Franzén), suddenly re-emerges and tries to wrest control of the clan away from his mother.

== Cast ==
- Peter Franzén - Laszlo
- Sanna-Kaisa Palo - Martta
- Samuli Vauramo - Kasper
- Jenni Banerjee - Lara
- Heikki Kinnunen - Niccolo/Otto
- Toni Wahlström - Ventti
- Lotta Lehtikari - Veera
- Elina Knihtilä - Roosa
- Puntti Valtonen - Jori
- Janne Reinikainen - Lutku
- Heikki Hela - Mojo

== Soundtrack ==
The soundtrack includes the song "While Your Lips are Still Red" by Tuomas Holopainen and Marko Hietala.
