= Music Inspired by the Life and Times of Scrooge =

Studio album by Tuomas Holopainen
- Released: 15 April 2014
- Recorded: August–October 2013
- Genres: Soundtrack; classical; celtic folk music
- Length: 54:05
- Labels: Nuclear Blast, Roadrunner
- Producer: Tuomas Holopainen

Singles from Music Inspired by the Life and Times of Scrooge
- 1. "A Lifetime of Adventure" Released: February 7, 2014

Music Inspired by the Life and Times of Scrooge is the first solo album by Finnish songwriter and keyboardist Tuomas Holopainen, best known for his work in the symphonic metal band Nightwish. It was based on cartoonist Don Rosa's The Life and Times of Scrooge McDuck, a graphic novel which featured the Carl Barks Disney comics character of the same name. Rosa contributed the cover artwork. The first single, "A Lifetime of Adventure" was released on February 5, 2014, along with a music video directed by Ville Lipiäinen.

It features several vocalists including Johanna Kurkela, Tony Kakko of Sonata Arctica and narration by Alan Reid, with lyrics in English and Scottish Gaelic. It also features the London Philharmonic Orchestra, the choir group Metro Voices, and several guest musicians including fellow Nightwish member Troy Donockley.

== Track listing ==
All tracks are written by Tuomas Holopainen.

No.	Title	Length
1.	"Glasgow 1877"	6:27
2.	"Into the West"	5:01
3.	"Duel & Cloudscapes"	4:50
4.	"Dreamtime"	4:47
5.	"Cold Heart of the Klondike"	6:52
6.	"The Last Sled"	5:40
7.	"Goodbye, Papa"	6:27
8.	"To Be Rich"	3:22
9.	"A Lifetime of Adventure"	6:13
10.	"Go Slowly Now, Sands of Time"	4:36
Total length:		54:05

iTunes/deluxe edition bonus tracks
No.	Title	Length
11.	"A Lifetime of Adventure (Alternative Version)"	6:00
Total length:		60:05

- The deluxe digibook also includes a bonus disc with an all instrumental version of the album minus the Alternative Version of "A Lifetime of Adventure".

This Track can be also found on the Standard Edition as a Hidden Track.

== Personnel ==
All information from the album booklet.

Musicians

- Tuomas Holopainen – keyboards, producer, photography
- Troy Donockley – uilleann pipes, low whistles, bodhran
- Mikko Iivanainen – guitars, banjo
- Teho Majamäki – didgeridoo
- Jon Burr – harmonica

Vocalists

- Johanna Kurkela as "Glittering" Goldie o'Gilt (on tracks 1, 2, 4, 6, 8, 9, 10)
- Johanna Iivanainen as The Narrator and Downy O'Drake (on tracks 1, 6, 8, 9)
- Alan Reid as Scrooge McDuck (on tracks 1, 6, 10)
- Tony Kakko as Storyteller (on track 5)

Orchestra and choir

- Pip Williams – orchestral arrangement and direction
- London Philharmonic Orchestra
- Metro Voices

Production

- Mika Jussila – mastering, photography
- Tero Kinnunen – recording, mixing
- Janne Pitkänen – layout
- Don Rosa – artwork

== Charts and certifications ==
=== Charts ===
Chart (2014)	Peak position
Austrian Albums (Ö3 Austria)	52
French Albums (SNEP)	80
Belgian Albums (Ultratop Flanders)	74
Belgian Albums (Ultratop Wallonia)	106
Dutch Albums (Album Top 100)	92
Finnish Albums (Suomen virallinen lista)	1
German Albums (Offizielle Top 100)	23
Scottish Albums (Official Charts)	77
Swiss Albums (Schweizer Hitparade)	19
UK Albums (Official Charts)	92
US Heatseekers Albums (Billboard)	29

The album went Gold in Finland.
