= Kuolema tekee taiteilijan =

"Kuolema Tekee Taiteilijan"

Single by Nightwish

from the album Once
- Language: Finnish
- English title: Death Makes an Artist
- B-side: "Creek Mary's Blood" (orchestral version); "Symphony of Destruction" (Megadeth cover; live)
- Released: November 24, 2004
- Length: 3:36
- Label: Spinefarm
- Songwriter(s): Tuomas Holopainen
- Producer(s): Tuomas Holopainen; TeeCee Kinnunen

Nightwish singles chronology
"Wish I Had an Angel" (2004)	"Kuolema Tekee Taiteilijan" (2004)	"The Siren" (2005)

"Kuolema Tekee Taiteilijan" is the third single released from the album Once by the Finnish symphonic metal band Nightwish. It was released on November 24, 2004, by Spinefarm Records, together with the platinum edition of Once. The single was only released in Japan and Finland.

While the lyrics to most of Nightwish's songs are in English, "Kuolema Tekee Taiteilijan" is sung in Finnish. The title translates to "Death Makes an Artist" in English. During the end credits of Nightwish's concert film A Day Before Tomorrow, an orchestral, instrumental version of "Kuolema Tekee Taiteilijan" plays.

Former Nightwish singer Anette Olzon performed the song at Stockholms Kulturfestival with the backing of an orchestra, and without the band, despite not speaking Finnish fluently.

== Track listing ==
1. "Kuolema Tekee Taiteilijan"
2. "Symphony of Destruction" (live Megadeth Cover)
3. "Creek Mary's Blood" (Orchestral Score)
4. "Where Were You Last Night" (Japan only)
5. "Wish I Had an Angel" (Demo) (Japan only)
6. "Ghost Love Score" (Orchestral version) (Japan only)

== Charts performance ==
Chart (2004/05)	Peak position
Finnish Singles Chart	1

== Personnel ==
- Tarja Turunen — soprano
- London Philharmonic Orchestra — orchestra and chorus
