= Slim's =

Former nightclub in San Francisco, California, USA

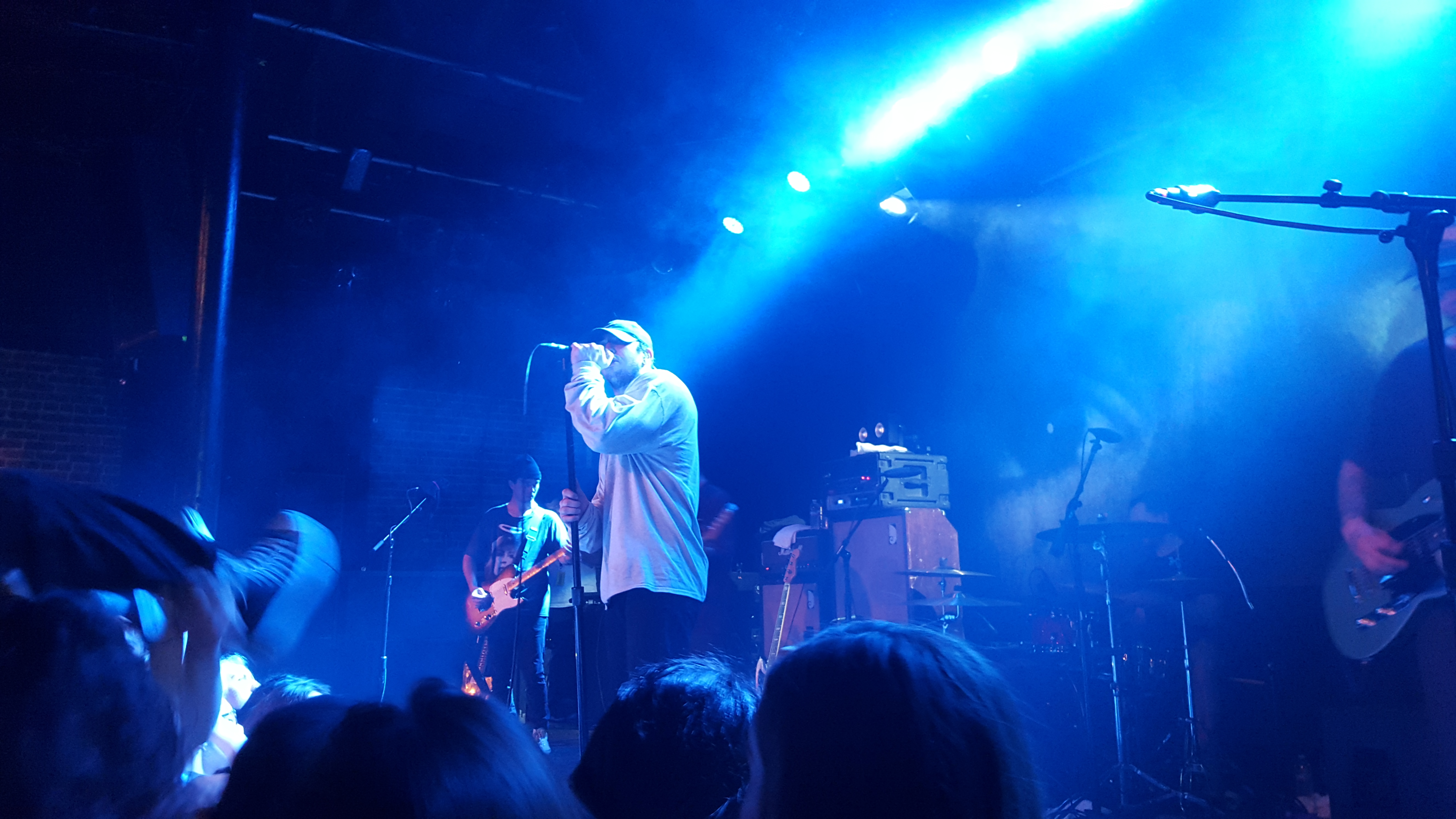
- Citizen performing at Slims, March 2016
- Interactive map of Slim's
- Address: 333 11th Street
- Location: San Francisco, California
- Coordinates: 37.771483°N 122.413339°W
- Owner: Boz Scaggs

Construction
- Opened: September 16, 1988
- Closed: March 18, 2020

Website
- slimspresents.com/slims/

Slim's was a nightclub and music venue in San Francisco, California, which was opened by Boz Scaggs in 1988. Scaggs and his partners took over a vacant restaurant which was called the Warehouse and threw a party there on December 31, 1987, to celebrate before closing it to remodel, and the new venue opened on September 16, 1988. The club closed permanently on March 18, 2020, a decision made before - but announced during - the lockdowns of the COVID-19 pandemic.

== History ==
The opening acts at Slim's on September 16, 1988 were Katie Webster, Anson Funderburgh, Delbert McClinton, and 'Presidio Slim' (a.k.a. Boz Scaggs). One of Scaggs's business partners is Frank Caufield, senior partner in the venture capital firm Kleiner, Perkins, Caufield and Byers.

The Oakland Interfaith Gospel Choir first performed their Christmas Eve concert at Slim's in 1988; since then, the choir has returned every Christmas Eve as a Bay Area tradition.

== Design ==
Slim's has an open floorplan with the stage at one end of the main level, and the bar running along two walls. There is a balcony at the other end with seating for 30, reserved for those who purchase Dinner & Admission tickets.

The "sister nightclub" to Slim's is the Great American Music Hall, owned by the same corporation since 2002.
