= Palladium (Cologne) =

Concert hall in Germany

Coordinates: 50.9690°N 7.0168°E

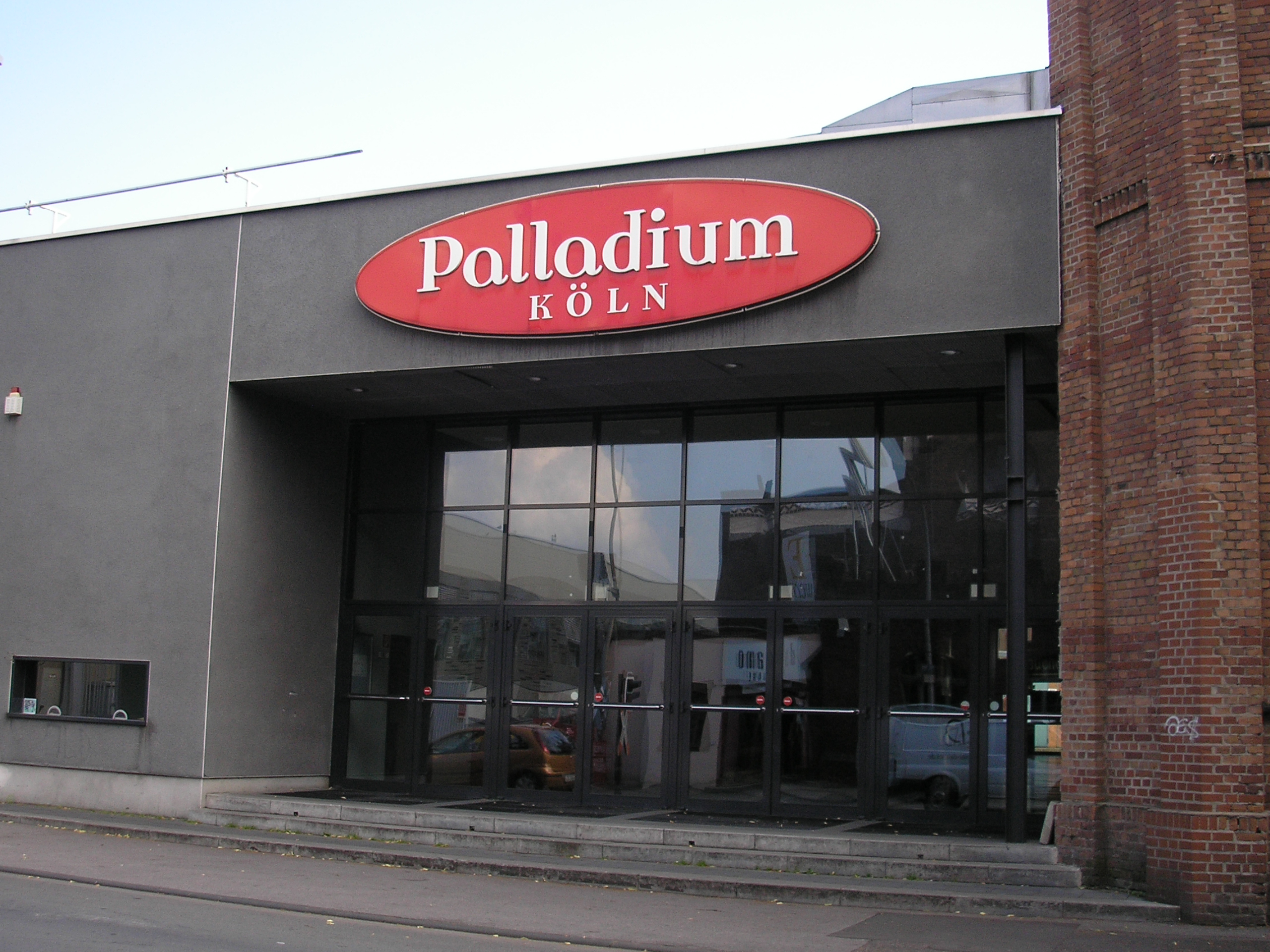
- Interactive map of Palladium
- Address: Schanzenstraße 36; Cologne; Germany
- Operator: Köln Event Veranstaltungsgesellschaft mbH
- Capacity: 4,000 (main hall), 900 (side hall)
- Type: Concert hall

Construction
- Groundbreaking: 1899
- Opened: 1998
- Renovated: 2007

Website
- https://www.palladium-koeln.de/?L=1

The Palladium is a concert hall in Cologne, located in the immediate vicinity of the E-Werk. The building was built in 1899 as a mechanical engineering hall for the company Trefil Europe Engineering and has served as a venue for cultural events, mainly concerts, since December 1998. The Palladium is operated by Köln Event Veranstaltungsgesellschaft mbH, which also runs the neighbouring E-Werk.

== Notable concerts ==
Erasure, Bullet for My Valentine, Ellie Goulding, Kylie Minogue, Within Temptation, OneRepublic, Fall Out Boy, Simple Minds, Kollegah, Lindsey Stirling, Jennifer Rostock, Slash, Girl in Red and Olivia Rodrigo, RADWIMPS, among others, have performed at the Palladium.

== See also ==
- List of indoor arenas in Germany
