= The Siren (song) =

Single by Nightwish

from the album Once
- B-side: "Kuolema Tekee Taiteilijan" (live); "Symphony of Destruction" (Megadeth cover; live)
- Released: 25 June 2005
- Genre: Symphonic metal
- Length: 3:48 (radio edit); 4:45 (album version)
- Label: Spinefarm; Nuclear Blast
- Composer(s): Tuomas Holopainen; Emppu Vuorinen
- Lyricist(s): Tuomas Holopainen
- Producer(s): Tuomas Holopainen; TeeCee Kinnunen

Nightwish singles chronology
"Kuolema tekee taiteilijan" (2004)	"The Siren" (2005)	"Sleeping Sun" (2005)

"The Siren" is the fourth and last single of the Finnish symphonic metal band Nightwish's fifth studio album Once. The song was recorded with the London Session Orchestra and includes many exotic instruments, for example an electric violin and a sitar; it also has very few lines. Vocals are by Tarja Turunen and Marko Hietala.

"Symphony of Destruction", a live cover included on the single, was originally performed by Megadeth on their album Countdown to Extinction.

The song was also performed with the second frontwoman, Anette Olzon, and on 19 September 2009, at the Hartwall Areena, the band was supported by violinist Pekka Kuusisto.

== Track listing ==
=== Spinefarm Records ===
1. The Siren (edited)
2. The Siren (album version)
3. The Siren (live)
4. Kuolema tekee taiteilijan (live)

=== Nuclear Blast Records ===
1. The Siren (edited)
2. The Siren (album version)
3. The Siren (live)
4. Symphony of Destruction (live)
5. Kuolema Tekee Taiteilijan (live)

=== Nems Enterprises ===
1. The Siren (edited)
2. The Siren
3. The Siren (live)

Bonus tracks:

1. Creek Mary' s Blood (orch. istr. score)
2. Symphony of Destruction (live)

== Chart performance ==
The Siren reached th 59th place in the Swiss charts, 51st in the German charts, 30th in Swedish the charts, third in the Finnish charts and fifteenth in the Danish charts.
