= Once (Nightwish album) =

2004 studio album by Nightwish

Studio album by Nightwish
- Released: 7 June 2004
- Recorded: November 2003 – March 2004
- Studios: Tempputupa (Kitee); Finnvox (Helsinki); E-Major (Kerava); Phoenix Sound (Wembley)
- Genres: Symphonic metal; power metal
- Length: 60:06
- Languages: English; Finnish
- Label: Spinefarm
- Producers: Tuomas Holopainen; TeeCee Kinnunen

Nightwish studio album chronology
Century Child (2002)	Once (2004)	Dark Passion Play (2007)

Alternative cover
- Special edition cover

Singles from Once
- 1. "Nemo" Released: 19 April 2004; 2. "Wish I Had an Angel" Released: 15 September 2004; 3. "Kuolema Tekee Taiteilijan" Released: 24 November 2004 (Finland and Japan only); 4. "The Siren" Released: 25 June 2005

Once is the fifth studio album by the Finnish symphonic metal band Nightwish, released on 7 June 2004 by Spinefarm Records in Finland and Nuclear Blast in the rest of Europe. It is the fifth and last album to feature Tarja Turunen on lead vocals. The album cost nearly €250,000 to make (€1,000,000 including the videos), which made it Finland's most expensive recording ever until the release of Nightwish's next album, Dark Passion Play, which cost over €500,000 to produce. As of 2013, Once had sold 2.3 million copies worldwide, becoming Nightwish's most successful album to date. The remastering of the album was released on 6 August 2021.

== Background ==
In a 2008 Kerrang! interview, Tuomas Holopainen remembered: "Doing this kind of really orchestral, symphonic stuff for four albums, you have to be prepared to take the next step and go 10 steps beyond, and that's how we ended up with the London Session Orchestra. At that time we also had the financial resources to do it. This was like our second breakthrough in a way; Oceanborn (1998) broke us, took us to the big league. Musically it was pretty laid-back from our side because everyone involved in the orchestra really knew their stuff, so we basically spent two days lying on the couch hearing all these people playing our songs, enjoying every moment. It was one of the most amazing experiences in my life. The first song they started to play was 'Ghost Love Score', we had no idea what to expect, and I just thought: This can't be happening!"

== Musical style ==
The album continues the more streamlined musical approach first heard on Century Child, moving further away from the power metal-influenced sound of their previous albums into symphonic metal with a slightly more mainstream, approachable feel. Once utilizes a full orchestra in nine of the eleven songs on the album; unlike Century Child, Nightwish chose an orchestra outside of Finland, the London Philharmonic Orchestra, which has been featured on every album released since.

Once is their second album to feature a full-length song in Finnish, "Kuolema Tekee Taiteilijan". The band added new elements to their music for this album, such as the chorus riff and synthesized drumbeat of "Wish I Had an Angel", and a long prayer chant, supposedly in the Lakota language, on "Creek Mary's Blood". However, a young member of the tribe and fluent Lakota speaker found that the lyrics Two-Hawks supposedly wrote in the language were 'nothing more than absolute gibberish.' This was later confirmed by David Little Elk, a certified Lakota language expert.

The song "Ghost Love Score" was described by Hietala as follows: "I'm a big fan of old prog rock and this is a song that has a lot of different parts going on, and different atmospheres in different places in order to support the story. [...] My biggest influence from the prog world would be Jethro Tull, but I also love listening to Yes and Genesis and all those bands, and there's a correlation between the structures and the length of a lot of their songs and this one."

"Dead Gardens" was the first song written for the album, and deals with a bout of writer's block Holopainen was having. After completing the song, Holopainen says the songs "started flowing like water", and writing the remainder of the album was simple.

The album's final track, "Higher Than Hope" is dedicated to Marc Brueland, a fan of the band who became friends with Holopainen. Brueland died of fibrolamellar hepatocellular carcinoma in October 2003, and the track features narration by Brueland taken from an interview shortly after his first cancer surgery, when it seemed like he was in remission. Lyrically, the song deals with Brueland's illness, death, and its effects on Holopainen.

== Artwork ==
The angel on the album cover is a view of the Angel of Grief, a sculpture by William Wetmore Story. The original is in the Protestant Cemetery of Rome, Italy.

== Tour ==
The success of the album allowed them to perform the Once Upon a Tour, which enabled them to play in many countries the band had never visited before. Nightwish performed at the opening ceremony of the 2005 World Championships in Athletics, held in Helsinki.

== Reception and legacy ==
Professional ratings
Review scores
Source	Rating
AllMusic	3.5/5 stars
Metal.de	8/10 stars
Metal Hammer (Germany)	7/7 stars
Metal Storm	6.5/10 stars
PopMatters	7/10
Rock Hard	9.5/10
Sea of Tranquility	5/5 stars 4/5 stars

During the first week of its release, Once entered the Finnish, German and Norwegian charts at number one, later topping the European Top 100 Albums chart. It was also the first Nightwish album to chart in the United States, reaching No. 42 on the Billboard Top Heatseekers chart, and the band's first album to chart in UK, reaching No. 10 on the Rock Chart. In 2005, Once was ranked number 383 in Rock Hard magazine's book The 500 Greatest Rock & Metal Albums of All Time. In 2017, it was ranked 89th at Rolling Stone's "100 Greatest Metal Albums of All Time".

Once has been certified double platinum in Finland, triple gold in Germany, and gold in Sweden. The single "Nemo" topped the charts in Finland and Hungary, and reached the top ten in four additional countries. It remained on the UK Rock Chart for more than a year. "Nemo" therefore remains their most successful single ever, and Once reached number 47 in the list of best-selling albums of all time in Finland. As of June 2013, the album had sold 2.3 million copies worldwide, Nightwish's best-selling album to date.

== Track listing ==
All lyrics are written by Tuomas Holopainen, except where noted; all music is composed by Holopainen, except where noted.

Once track listing
No.	Title	Music	Length
1.	"Dark Chest of Wonders"		4:28
2.	"Wish I Had an Angel"		4:03
3.	"Nemo"		4:36
4.	"Planet Hell"		4:39
5.	"Creek Mary's Blood"		8:29
6.	"The Siren"	Holopainen; Emppu Vuorinen	4:45
7.	"Dead Gardens"		4:26
8.	"Romanticide"	Holopainen; Marko Hietala	4:57
9.	"Ghost Love Score"		10:00
10.	"Kuolema Tekee Taiteilijan" (Finnish for "Death Makes an Artist")		3:34
11.	"Higher Than Hope" (in memory of Marc Brueland)	Hietala; Holopainen	5:35
Total length:			60:06

International special edition bonus tracks
No.	Title	Length
12.	"White Night Fantasy"	4:04
13.	"Live to Tell the Tale"	5:02
Total length:		69:12

Korean special edition bonus disc
No.	Title	Writer(s)	Length
1.	"Where Were You Last Night" (Ankie Bagger cover)	Norell Oson Bard	3:53
2.	"Wish I Had an Angel" (demo)		4:08
Total length:			8:01

== Personnel ==
All information from the album booklet.

Nightwish

- Tarja Turunen – vocals
- Tuomas Holopainen – keyboards
- Emppu Vuorinen – guitars
- Marko Hietala – bass, male vocals on tracks 2, 4, 6, 8, and 11
- Jukka Nevalainen – drums, percussion

Additional musicians

- Marc Brueland – narration on "Higher Than Hope"
- Jouni Hynynen – growling on "Dead Gardens"
- Sami Yli-Sirniö – sitar on "The Siren"
- John Two-Hawks – vocals and Native American flute on "Creek Mary's Blood"
- Olli Halonen – slide guitars
- Martin Loveday – cello on "The Siren"
- Sonia Slany – violin on "The Siren"
- London Philharmonic Orchestra – orchestral parts
- Jenny O'Grady – choirmaster
- Metro Voices – choir
- James Shearman – orchestra and choir conductor
- Gavyn Wright – orchestra leader

Production

- Tuomas Holopainen – producer, mixing
- Emppu Vuorinen – additional engineering
- Tero "TeeCee" Kinnunen – producer, engineer, mixing
- Mikko Karmila – engineer, mixing
- Mika Jussila – mastering
- Pip Williams – choir and orchestral arrangements
- James Collins – orchestral recordings engineer
- Aaron Price – assistant engineer
- Simon Goldfinch – assistant engineer
- Markus Mayer – cover art
- Toni Härkönen – photography
- Petteri Tyynelä – layout

== Charts ==
=== Weekly charts ===
Weekly chart performance for Once
Chart (2004)	Peak position
Austrian Albums (Ö3 Austria)	4
Belgian Albums (Ultratop Flanders)	30
Belgian Albums (Ultratop Wallonia)	42
Czech Albums (ČNS IFPI)	32
Dutch Albums (Album Top 100)	11
European Albums (Billboard)	1
Finnish Albums (Suomen virallinen lista)	1
French Albums (SNEP)	9
German Albums (Offizielle Top 100)	1
Hungarian Albums (MAHASZ)	5
Italian Albums (FIMI)	39
Norwegian Albums (VG-lista)	1
Polish Albums (ZPAV)	16
Swedish Albums (Sverigetopplistan)	3
Swedish Hard Rock Albums (Sverigetopplistan)	1
Swiss Albums (Schweizer Hitparade)	4
UK Independent Albums (Official Charts)	6
UK Rock & Metal Albums (Official Charts)	10
US Heatseekers Albums (Billboard)	42

Chart (2021)	Peak position
Scottish Albums (Official Charts)	81

=== Year-end charts ===
Year-end chart performance for Once
Chart (2004)	Position
Austrian Albums (Ö3 Austria)	72
Finnish Albums (Suomen virallinen lista)	1
German Albums (Offizielle Top 100)	20
Swedish Albums (Sverigetopplistan)	37
Swedish Albums & Compilations (Sverigetopplistan)	47
Swiss Albums (Schweizer Hitparade)	34

== Certifications and sales ==
Certifications and sales for Once
Region	Certification	Certified units/sales
Austria (IFPI Austria)	Gold	15,000^{*}
Finland (Musiikkituottajat)	2× Platinum	107,288
Germany (BVMI)	3× Gold	300,000^{^}
Greece (IFPI Greece)	Gold	10,000^{^}
Norway (IFPI Norway)	Gold	20,000^{*}
Sweden (GLF)	Gold	30,000^{^}
Switzerland (IFPI Switzerland)	Gold	20,000^{^}
United Kingdom (BPI)	Silver	60,000^{‡}
Summaries
Worldwide	—	2,300,000
^{*} Sales figures based on certification alone.^{^} Shipments figures based on certification alone.^{‡} Sales+streaming figures based on certification alone.

== Release history ==
Release history for Once
Region	Date	Label	Catalog No.	Note
Finland	7 June 2004	Spinefarm	981890-4	
Europe	7 June 2004	Nuclear Blast	27361 12912	Released in four different editions
Japan	21 July 2004	Spinefarm; Universal	UICO-1067	
Australia	5 October 2004	Roadrunner	RR 8216-2	
New Zealand	5 October 2004	Roadrunner	RR 8216-2	
Canada	5 October 2004	Roadrunner	168618217-2	
United States	5 October 2004	Roadrunner	168618217-2	
Brazil	15 December 2004	Spinefarm; Universal	AK5000	
Argentina	12 February 2005	NEMS Enterprises	NEMS 335	Released in two different editions
Japan	3 December 2008	Spinefarm; Universal	UICY-91258	Super Audio CD
Various	6 August 2021	Nuclear Blast	NE 4534	Remastered version
