= Nemo (song) =

2004 song by Nightwish

Single by Nightwish

from the album Once
- B-side: "White Night Fantasy"; "Live to Tell the Tale"; "Planet Hell"
- Released: 19 April 2004
- Genre: Symphonic metal
- Length: 3:45 (radio edit); 4:36 (album version)
- Label: Spinefarm
- Songwriter: Tuomas Holopainen
- Producers: Tuomas Holopainen; TeeCee Kinnunen

Nightwish singles chronology
"Bless the Child" (2002)	"Nemo" (2004)	"Wish I Had an Angel" (2004)

Music video
- "Nemo" on YouTube

"Nemo" is the eighth single by the Finnish symphonic metal band Nightwish and the first from the album Once. A big-budget video was made for the song; the director was Antti Jokinen, who had previously worked with Shania Twain, Celine Dion and Eminem. The video was number one on MTV Brasil Video Chart. The song was nominated for the Kerrang! Award for Best Single. Although Nightwish already enjoyed a solid fan base in Europe and South America by the time of the single's release, it is considered their breakthrough song since it helped them reach a wider audience.

The song can be heard in the ending credits of the 2005 film The Cave.

== Composition ==
Keyboardist and songwriter Tuomas Holopainen says the song was "one of the most difficult songs" the band's ever done. It took them months to work on the arrangement. The first version was faster and two minutes longer, but recording engineer Tero Kinnunen suggested they cut off a certain section and slowed it down by about 10 bpm.

== Lyrics ==
Holopainen mistakenly believed "nemo" to be Latin for "no name" while instead meaning "nobody". He stated the song is based on his occasional feelings of being lost, longing for the past and feeling nameless. This contradicts speculations that the song simply borrows on a Nemo character of an earlier work, such as J. Verne's Captain Nemo, Homer's Ulysses alias Nemo, C. Dickens’ Captain Hawdon alias Nemo, W. McCay's Little Nemo, or the Disney Studio's film Finding Nemo. Asked about that, Holopainen responded:

Not the fish! I cannot believe how everyone seems to be convinced it's that. Nemo, which is Latin for "nobody," has nothing to do with the Disney film. It revolves around the feelings I have from time to time. I feel nameless and do not know who I am or where I will go. I only know my past and I long to be back there. The song is about being lost, not knowing where to go or what to do, yet desperate for everything in life. That’s not always me, but when I wrote Nemo, that's the way I felt. Now I feel better. (Translated from German)

— Tuomas Holopainen, Underground Empire interview

In a 2016 interview, he said he "was just a much darker person then than I am now" and that he "would never do a song like that again".

== Music video ==
The song received a video that cost around €80,000, which is much more than most heavy metal videos cost at that time. It was directed by Finnish director Antti Jokinen and shows the band performing among snowy mountains. Then vocalist Tarja Turunen is wearing a red coat, which she admits to be different from other symphonic metal female vocalists, who usually dress in black. A second version of the video included footage from The Cave.

The video was heavily played on TVs around the world, but according to Turunen, some channels were reluctant at first due to the video having been shot in the snow. Also, she said the video helped the band gain more attention from gothic fans, even though she doesn't believe they have ever considered themselves to be a gothic band.

== Live performances ==
Nemo is the most played song by Nightwish, with well over 640 times as of August 2023. After Turunen left Nightwish, "Nemo" became one of the songs from the band that she would frequently perform live in her solo concerts.

== Track listings ==
CD1
No.	Title	Writer(s)	Length
1.	"Nemo" (w/ fade out)	Holopainen	4:28
2.	"Planet Hell"	Holopainen	4:42
3.	"White Night Fantasy" (non-album bonus track)	Holopainen	4:05
4.	"Nemo" (orchestral version)	Holopainen	4:37
5.	"Enhanced Part" (studio report / photo gallery)		4:05

CD2
No.	Title	Writer(s)	Length
1.	"Nemo" (w/ cold end)	Holopainen	4:36
2.	"Live to Tell the Tale" (exclusive bonus track)	Holopainen	5:02
3.	"Nemo" (orchestral version)	Holopainen	4:37
4.	"Nemo promotional video" (m-peg)		4:05

10-inch
No.	Title	Writer(s)	Length
1.	"Nemo" (w/ cold end)	Holopainen	4:36
2.	"White Night Fantasy" (non-album bonus track)	Holopainen	4:05
3.	"Nemo" (orchestral version)	Holopainen	4:37
4.	"Planet Hell"	Holopainen	4:42
5.	"Live to Tell the Tale" (non-album bonus track)	Holopainen	5:02

DVD
No.	Title	Writer(s)	Length
1.	"Nemo" (video / stereo & 5.1)	Holopainen	4:05
2.	"Nemo" (audio / stereo & 5.1)	Holopainen	4:36
3.	"Planet Hell" (audio / stereo & 5.1)	Holopainen	4:42
4.	"The Making of Nemo" (video / stereo)

== Personnel ==
Personnel are adapted from the Nightwish website.

Nightwish

- Tarja Turunen — vocals
- Tuomas Holopainen — keyboards
- Emppu Vuorinen — guitars
- Jukka Nevalainen — drums
- Marko Hietala — bass
- London Philharmonic Orchestra — Orchestra and chorus

Main crew

- Engineers and recorders: Tero Kinnunen, Mikko Karmila and Emppu Vuorinen
- Mixing: Mikko Karmila and Tuomas Holopainen
- Mastering: Mika Jussila
- Orchestral and choral arrangements: Pip Williams
- Conducted: James Shearman
- Orchestra Leader: Gavyn Wright
- Band photographer: Toni Härkönen

== Chart performance ==
"Nemo" topped the charts in Finland and Hungary; in the former country, it was the highest-selling single of 2004 from a domestic artist. In the United Kingdom, it charted at number 87, giving Nightwish their first chart entry, and peaked at number five on the UK Rock Chart. Elsewhere in Europe, the single became a top-10 hit in Germany and Norway and a top-20 hit in Austria, Sweden, and Switzerland. "Nemo" was certified platinum in Finland, selling 13,109 copies.

=== Weekly charts ===
Chart (2004)	Peak position
Austria (Ö3 Austria Top 40)	12
Europe (Eurochart Hot 100)	19
Finland (Suomen virallinen lista)	1
Germany (GfK)	6
Hungary (Single Top 40)	1
Netherlands (Single Top 100)	64
Norway (VG-lista)	4
Scottish Singles Sales (Official Charts)	97
Sweden (Sverigetopplistan)	12
Switzerland (Schweizer Hitparade)	14
UK Singles (Official Charts)	87
UK Rock & Metal (Official Charts)	5

=== Year-end charts ===
Chart (2004)	Position
Austria (Ö3 Austria Top 40)	65
Finland Domestic (Suomen virallinen lista)	1
Germany (Media Control GfK)	40
Sweden (Hitlistan)	93

== Sales and certifications ==
Region	Certification	Certified units/sales
Finland (Musiikkituottajat)	Platinum	13,109
