= Bless the Child (song) =

Single by Nightwish

from the album Century Child
- B-side: "Lagoon"; "The Wayfarer"
- Released: 21 July 2002
- Recorded: 2002
- Studio: Caverock, Kitee, Finland; Finnvox, Helsinki, Finland
- Genre: Symphonic metal
- Length: 4:05 (single edit); 6:12 (album version)
- Label: Spinefarm
- Songwriter(s): Tuomas Holopainen
- Producer(s): Tuomas Holopainen; TeeCee Kinnunen

Nightwish singles chronology
"Ever Dream" (2002)	"Bless the Child" (2002)	"Nemo" (2004)

Music video
- "Bless the Child" on YouTube

"Bless the Child" is the seventh single by the Finnish symphonic metal band Nightwish, released as the second single from their album Century Child. It is one of two songs which were filmed from the Century Child album, with other one being "End of All Hope". It was also the first song bassist/vocalist Marko Hietala worked on after he joined the band replacing Sami Vänskä.

There are two versions of the single, each having a slightly different track list. The normal release includes the title track and the two songs, "Lagoon" and "The Wayfarer", which have not been released in Germany before. There is too a limited DVD plus of the single which includes three DVD videotracks in addition to the audio content. The videos are "Over the Hills and Far Away", "Bless the Child", and a 30-minute interview.

In addition to it being a single, part of the edited version was used in a Chinese broadcast on CCTV-4.

== Track listing ==
=== Spinefarm version ===
1. "Bless the Child" (Edit)
2. "Bless the Child"
3. "Lagoon"

=== Spinefarm EP ===
1. "Bless the Child"
2. "The Wayfarer"
3. "Come Cover Me" (Live)
4. "Dead Boy's Poem" (Live)
5. "Once Upon a Troubadour"
6. "A Return to the Sea"
7. "Sleepwalker" (Heavy Version)
8. "Nightquest"

=== Drakkar version ===
1. "Bless the Child"
2. "Lagoon"
3. "The Wayfarer"

=== NEMS EP ===
1. "Bless the Child" (Edit)
2. "Walking in the Air" (Edit)
3. "The Wayfarer"
4. "The Kinslayer" (Live in Argentina)
5. "Deep Silent Complete" (Live)
6. "The Pharaoh Sails to Orion" (Live)
7. "Come Cover Me" (Live)
8. "Wanderlust" (Live)
9. "Instrumental" (Live)
10. "Swanheart" (Live)
11. "Elvenpath" (Live)
12. "Fantasmic Part 3" (Live)
13. "Dead Boy's Poem" (Live)
14. "Sleepwalker" (Original Version)
15. "Lagoon"
16. "Over the Hills and Far Away" (Video Edit Mix)

=== Sales and certifications ===
Country	Certification (sales thresholds)
Finland	Platinum

== Personnel ==
- Tarja Turunen - vocals
- Tuomas Holopainen - keyboards
- Emppu Vuorinen - guitars
- Jukka Nevalainen - drums
- Marko Hietala - bass
- Sam Hardwick - spoken word

== Video ==
The video for this song tells a sad love story in reverse, it's a mix between the scenes and the band playing in a disused warehouse. The band was a bit disappointed with the video, because they found it to be a bit too complex.
