= Wish I Had an Angel =

2004 single by Nightwish

"Wish I Had An Angel"

Single by Nightwish

from the album Once
- B-side: "Ghost Love Score" (orchestral version); "Where Were You Last Night" (Ankie Bagger cover)
- Released: 15 September 2004
- Genre: Symphonic metal; power metal
- Length: 4:03
- Label: Spinefarm
- Songwriter: Tuomas Holopainen
- Producers: Tuomas Holopainen; TeeCee Kinnunen

Nightwish singles chronology
"Nemo" (2004)	"Wish I Had An Angel" (2004)	"Kuolema Tekee Taiteilijan" (2004)

Music videos
- "Wish I Had an Angel" on YouTube
- "Wish I Had an Angel" (Alone in the Dark version) on YouTube

"Wish I Had An Angel" is the ninth single by the Finnish symphonic metal band Nightwish, the second from their fifth album Once. The song features vocals by then-vocalist Tarja Turunen and bassist Marko Hietala. The song was still performed live after Turunen's departure with Anette Olzon, before her departure, and current vocalist Floor Jansen afterwards. Featured on the soundtrack of the film Alone in the Dark, it became the group's most popular single in Europe and in the United States, next to "Nemo". It made it onto two U.S. film soundtracks. It reached #60 in the UK Singles Chart, the highest of any of the band's singles in the UK.

== Track listing ==
All tracks are written by Tuomas Holopainen, except "Where Were You Last Night" written by Norell Oson Bard.

1. "Wish I Had an Angel" – 4:06
2. "Ghost Love Score" (orchestral version) – 10:47
3. "Where Were You Last Night" (Ankie Bagger cover) – 3:52
4. "Wish I Had an Angel" (demo) – 4:08

== Personnel ==
- Tarja Turunen – lead vocals
- Tuomas Holopainen – keyboards
- Emppu Vuorinen – guitars
- Jukka Nevalainen – drums
- Marko Hietala – bass, co-lead vocals
- London Philharmonic Orchestra - Orchestra and chorus

== Music videos ==
Directed by Uwe Boll, "Wish I Had an Angel" was the last video from Once and it features some scenes from the 2005 movie Alone in the Dark, also directed by Boll. An alternate version omits the film's footage, due to the immense negative reception of the said film.

== Charts ==
Chart (2004)	Peak position
Austrian Top 75 Singles	47
Dutch Singles Chart	65
Finnish Singles Chart	1
German Singles Chart	36
Hungarian Singles Chart	3
Norwegian Singles Chart	19
Spanish Singles Chart	11
Swedish Singles Chart	11
Swiss Top 100 Singles	40
UK Singles Chart	60
Chart (2005)	Peak position
Finnish Singles Chart	15
Spanish Singles Chart	20

=== Sales and certifications ===
Country	Certification (sales thresholds)
Finland	Gold
