= Tuomas Holopainen =

Finnish songwriter, producer and keyboardist

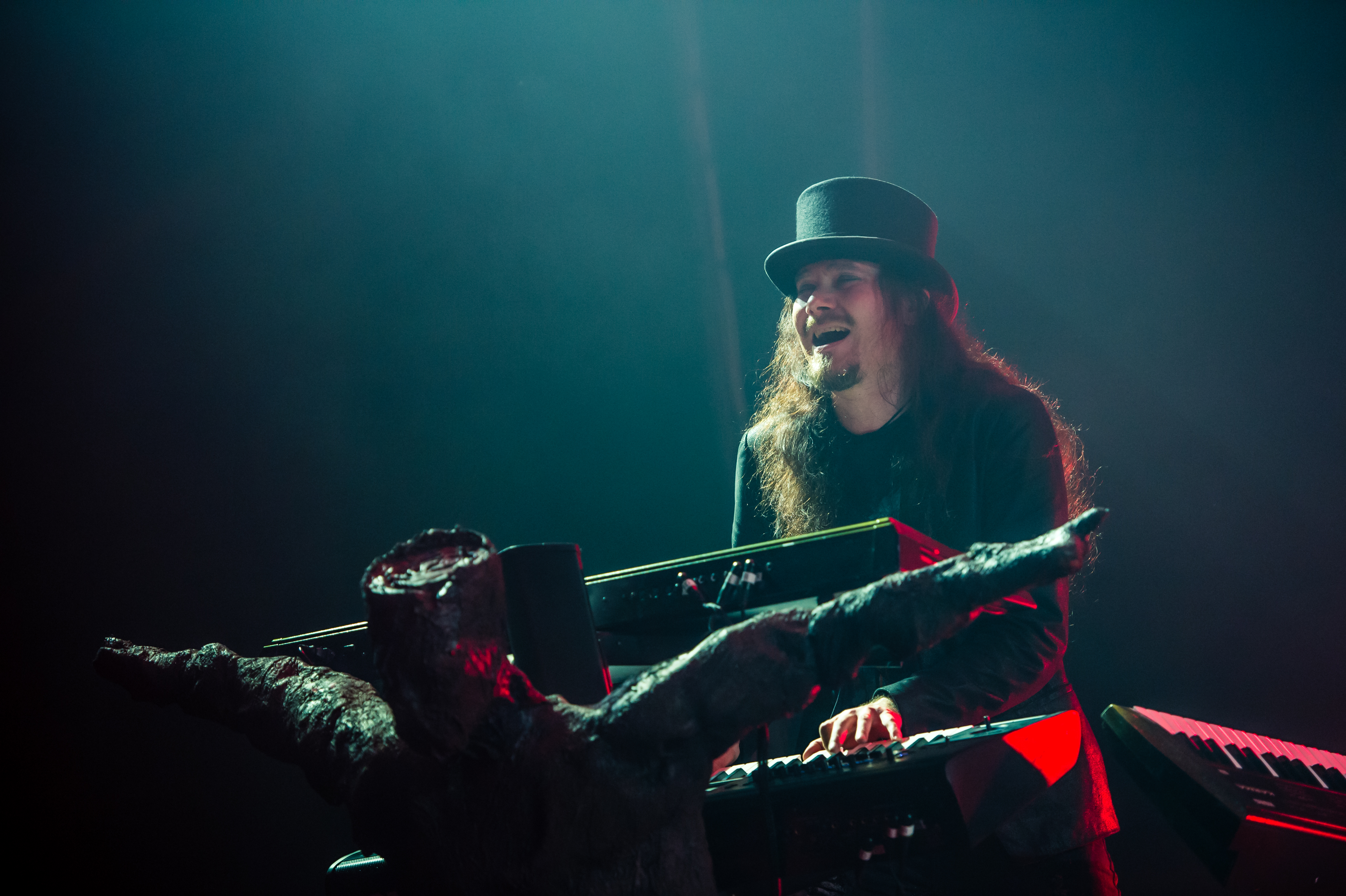
- Holopainen performing with Nightwish in 2015

Background information
- Born: Tuomas Lauri Johannes Holopainen; 25 December 1976 (age 49); Kitee, Finland
- Genres: Symphonic metal; power metal; gothic metal; progressive folk
- Occupations: Musician; composer; record producer
- Instrument: Keyboards
- Years active: 1991–present
- Label: Nuclear Blast
- Member of: Nightwish; Auri; Darkwoods My Betrothed
- Formerly of: Nattvindens Gråt; For My Pain...
- Spouse: Johanna Kurkela

Tuomas Lauri Johannes Holopainen (born 25 December 1976) is a Finnish musician, songwriter, and record producer, best known as the primary songwriter, keyboardist, and founding member of the symphonic metal band Nightwish. He has stated that his songwriting is influenced by harmonic film music.

Before founding Nightwish, he played in the band Darkwoods My Betrothed. He later recorded an album with them as a full member in 2020. He also collaborated with the gothic metal band For My Pain... and the band of Timo Rautiainen.

Holopainen has written several songs that have been included in movie soundtracks, including a collaboration with Nightwish bass player and male vocalist Marko Hietala on "While Your Lips Are Still Red", for the Finnish film Lieksa! in 2007. He also co-wrote the music for Nightwish's own film, Imaginaerum, released in November 2012.

Holopainen released his first solo album Music Inspired by the Life and Times of Scrooge in 2014.

== Early and personal life ==
Tuomas Holopainen was born in Kitee on Christmas Day 1976. His parents were entrepreneur Pentti Holopainen (1940–2021), and Kirsti Nortia-Holopainen, a former music and English teacher in a small elementary school. He has an older sister named Susanna who works as a surgeon-urologist, and an older brother named Petri who is an autopsy assistant. He and singer Elina Siirala are second cousins. His musicality and skill in text expression showed early in school. His mother signed him up for piano class in school when he was seven years old, and he later studied clarinet, tenor saxophone, piano and music theory for twelve years at a music college. However, he has not played the clarinet nor the saxophone since the mid-nineties. Originally aspiring to be a biologist, Holopainen had no interest in metal until his school foreign exchange partner took him to see Metallica and Guns N' Roses in America, and he became hooked.

Holopainen is a fan of Disney, Tolkien and Dragonlance. In 2006 Holopainen said that he is "not religious, but an open-minded, thinking individual". He does not consider "religion to be bad, but human interpretation of it."

Holopainen married Finnish pop singer Johanna Kurkela on 28 October 2015.

He is a vegetarian.

A new insect species, Sciophilia holopaineni, discovered by a Finnish biologist named Jukka Salmela of Metsähallitus Parks & Wildlife, has been named after Tuomas Holopainen, because of Holopainen's love for nature.

== Musical career ==
=== First bands, formation of Nightwish and first releases ===
Holopainen joined his first bands in 1991. He played in several bands, including recording keyboards for three albums with black metal band Darkwoods My Betrothed and playing with Dismal Silence, Nattvindens Gråt and Sethian. He was then conscripted for the Finnish Army, where he managed to earn a position as the clarinet player of the military band, which spared him from gun-related activities.

In July 1996, a 19-year-old Holopainen began thinking of starting a band of his own, for which he would write the music and play keyboards. This was the birth of Nightwish, around a camp fire. He asked Emppu Vuorinen and classmate Tarja Turunen to join what was then an acoustic project, with music he wrote during his time in the army. After hearing Tarja's strong voice, and because of the metal influences of Vuorinen and drummer Jukka Nevalainen, Tuomas decided to turn Nightwish into a metal act. Before becoming a full-time musician, Holopainen worked for two years as a high school stand-in teacher in his hometown and studied six months of Biology in college until Nightwish's debut.

Nightwish's first non-demo release, Angels Fall First, came in 1997, followed by Oceanborn in 1998. In 1999, Holopainen and members of other Finnish metal acts like Embraze, Eternal Tears of Sorrow, Charon and Reflexion started the gothic metal supergroup For My Pain.... However, as all the members were busy with their own bands, the project was postponed for the future.

Nightwish's third studio album, Wishmaster, was released in 2000. The third release sold even better than the previous album. In 2001, again the idea of For My Pain... was brought up, and the members started planning a debut.

=== World fame ===
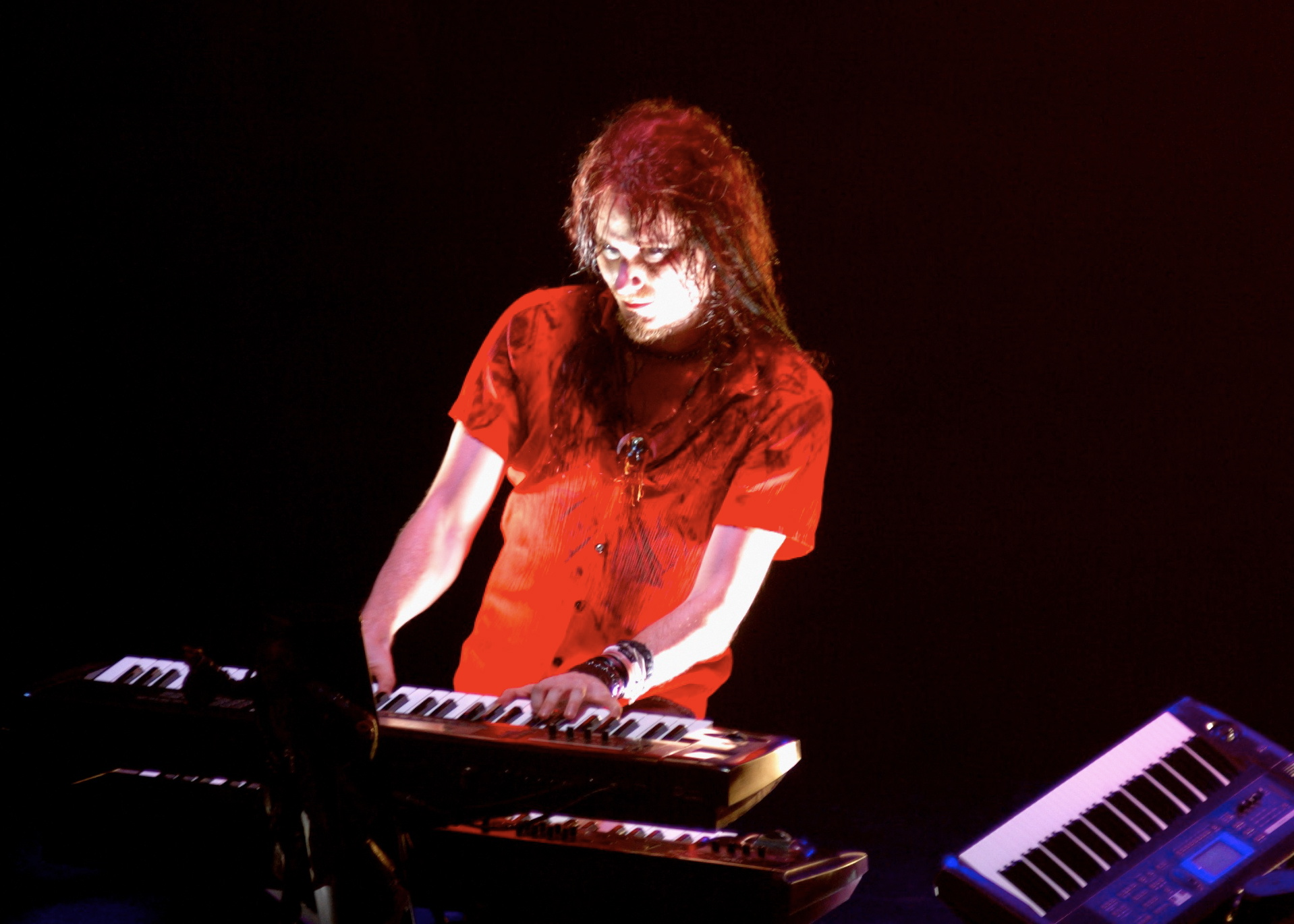
Holopainen performing keyboards during a Nightwish concert

In Nightwish's fourth studio album Century Child, released in 2002, Holopainen began collaborating with symphonic orchestras from Finland and the United Kingdom, which was a change in the band's music and Holopainen's style of composition, and also allowed for more freedom with additional instruments. The use of orchestral elements has been present in the studio album releases from Nightwish since.

In 2003, For My Pain... released its debut album, entitled Fallen. In 2004, For My Pain... released "Killing Romance", a Finnish single with three previously unreleased tracks; "Killing Romance", "Joutsenlaulu" and "Too Sad to Live".

Nightwish's fifth studio album, Once was released in 2004, and became their US break-through. Singles "Nemo" and "Wish I Had an Angel" were played on MTV. Nightwish started their most extensive tour to date, the Once World Tour, visiting several countries, like Japan, for the first time. After the last concert (a filmed show in Hartwall Areena, Finland which was featured on the End of an Era DVD in 2006), in October 2005, Nightwish gave vocalist Tarja Turunen a letter explaining her dismissal from the band.

=== Current career ===
In 2006, Holopainen went through a dark period filled with anxiety and depression, made worse by rumours about himself and Nightwish in the tabloids every day. These events also inspired him in the writing of Dark Passion Play, Nightwish's sixth album.

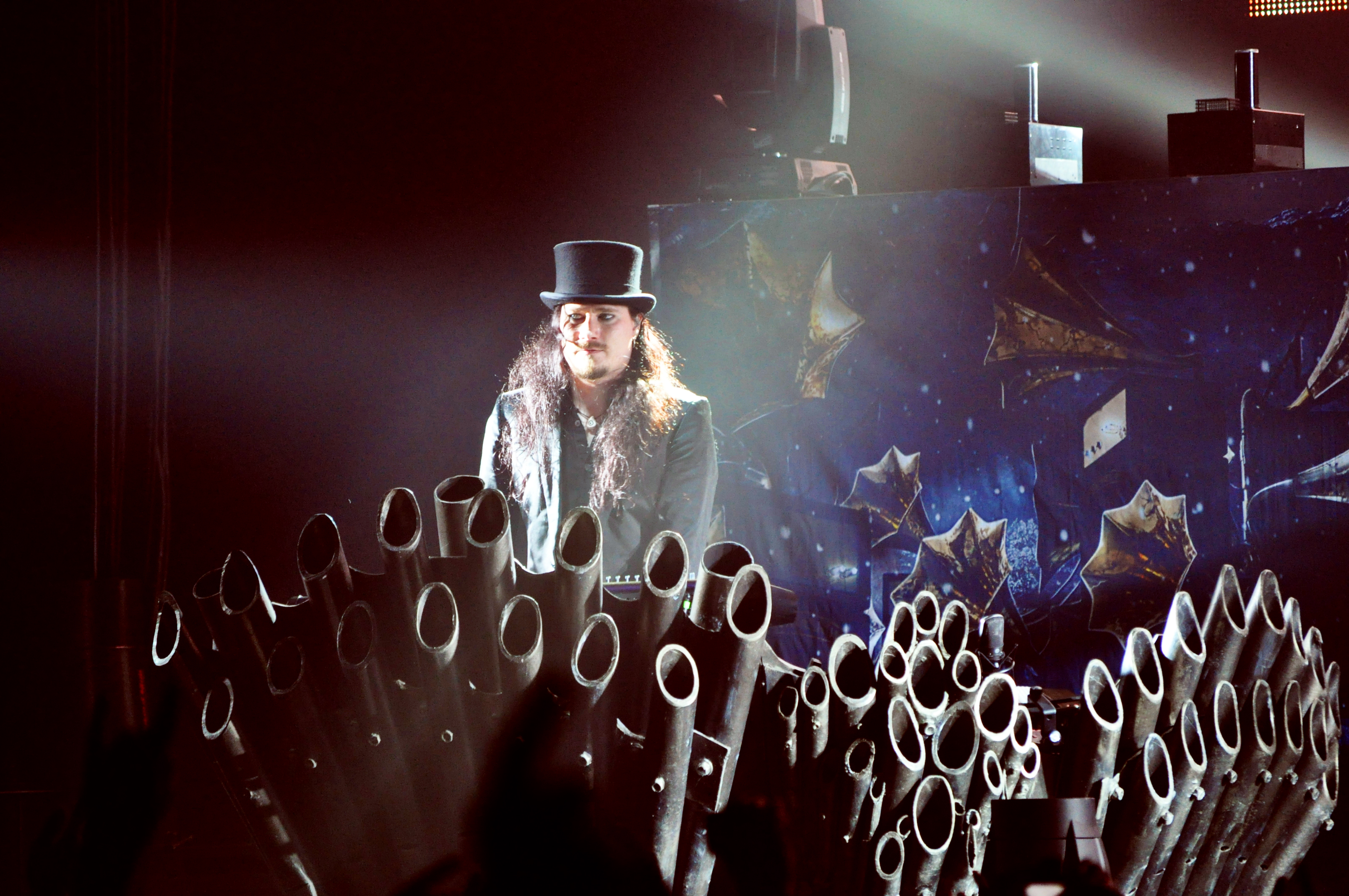
Holopainen performing with Nightwish in 2012

After heavy metal singer Timo Rautiainen's break up of Trio Niskalaukaus, he published his first solo album titled Sarvivuori with a crew gathered from different bands, including Holopainen on keyboards. Holopainen also wrote one song on the album. Early the next year, For My Pain... announced that they would soon start recording the successor to Fallen, but it was reported in the same autumn that the album once again was postponed.

In April 2007 Holopainen collaborated with fellow Nightwish member Marko Hietala to write a theme song for the Finnish film Lieksa!. The song, "While Your Lips Are Still Red", was the first song he had written specifically for a film, though several Nightwish songs ("Nemo", "Wish I Had an Angel", "Amaranth") have been included in film soundtracks. Holopainen has said that writing film scores is something he would like to do in the future. On "While Your Lips Are Still Red", in addition to Holopainen on piano, Marko Hietala performs vocals and acoustic bass guitar, and Jukka Nevalainen plays drums.

In 2007, Holopainen played keyboards with Finnish punk band Kylähullut on their EP Lisää persettä rättipäille. He would return to play keyboards on their following album Peräaukko sivistyksessä. Holopainen can be heard singing with the chorus on both of these releases.

The new vocalist for Nightwish was revealed in May 2007; Swede Anette Olzon, who appears on Dark Passion Play, released in late August of the same year. On 8 May 2008, it was announced that Holopainen would be the producer of Finnish pop/rock band Indica's fourth album, Valoissa, which was released in 2008. Holopainen was credited for helping to create the Finnish trance artist Orkidea's third album, Metaverse in 2008, for the collaboration in Orkidea's version of Nightwish's song "Bye Bye Beautiful".

Nightwish's seventh studio album, Imaginaerum, was released on 30 November 2011 in Finland and in North America on 10 January 2012. Nightwish released their eighth and ninth studio albums, Endless Forms Most Beautiful and Human. :II: Nature. on 25 March 2015 and 10 April 2020 respectively, and later released their tenth studio album, Yesterwynde on 20 September 2024.

== Solo projects ==
Holopainen originally confirmed that he was producing a solo project in 2012. Holopainen stated on his website, The Escapist, that he planned to devote his time completely to songwriting for the project in Feb–April 2013 after the Nightwish Imaginaerum tour. In 2014 he released Music Inspired by the Life and Times of Scrooge based on the comic book series "The Life and Times of Scrooge McDuck" by Don Rosa. The record featured Nightwish musician Troy Donockley as well as the London session musicians used previously in recent Nightwish releases.

In a November 2015 interview, he revealed plans to release a book with short fantasy and horror stories influenced by Neil Gaiman and Stephen King.

Holopainen also composed the song "Lohtu" for year 2015 concert "Live Aid ULS2017".

== Music ==
=== Composing ===
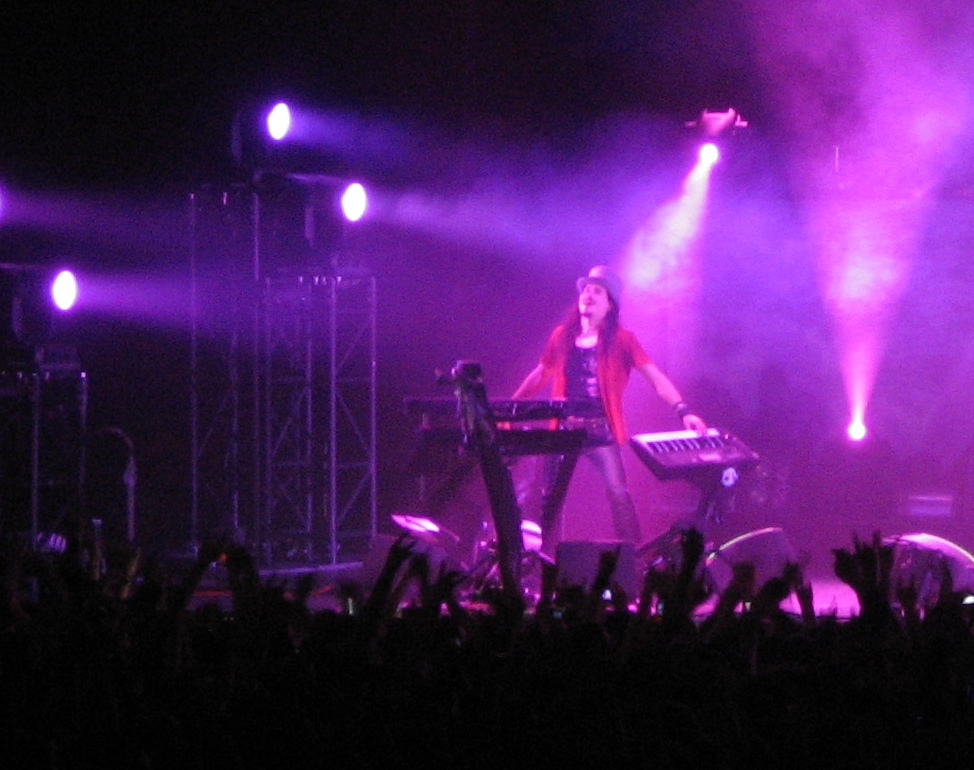
Holopainen live with Nightwish in Paris, France, on 6 April 2008

Holopainen is a source of inspiration for other bands, especially within symphonic, gothic and power metal. Simone Simons, lead singer of Epica, stated that she began singing due to Nightwish. Ex-singer of Visions of Atlantis, Nicole Bogner, also acknowledged that Nightwish had greatly inspired the band, especially for their first album.

Sander Gommans of After Forever said that Nightwish "will certainly influence us in creating new songs". Finnish power metal band Sonata Arctica's lead singer Tony Kakko, who has worked with Nightwish both in making the "Beauty and the Beast" duet with Tarja Turunen and as a crowd warmer, explained several times how much of an influence Nightwish is for him.

== Discography ==
Studio albums:

- Music Inspired by the Life and Times of Scrooge (2014)

=== Darkwoods My Betrothed ===
Studio albums:

- Heirs of the Northstar (1995)
- Autumn Roars Thunder (1996)
- Witch-Hunts (1998)
- Angel of Carnage Unleashed (2021)

=== Nattvindens Gråt ===
Studio albums:

- A Bard's Tale (1995)
- Chaos Without Theory (1997)

=== Auri ===
Studio albums:

- Auri (2018)
- II – Those We Don't Speak Of (2021)
- III – Candles & Beginnings (2025)

=== For My Pain... ===
Studio albums:

- Fallen (2003)
