= Endless Forms Most Beautiful =

The phrase "endless forms most beautiful and most wonderful" occurs in the closing statement of Charles Darwin's 1859 book On the Origin of Species.

Endless Forms Most Beautiful may also refer to:

- Endless Forms Most Beautiful (book), a 2005 book on evolutionary developmental biology by Sean B. Carroll
- Endless Forms Most Beautiful (album), a 2015 album by Finnish symphonic metal band Nightwish
  - "Endless Forms Most Beautiful" (song), a single from the album
- "Endless Forms Most Beautiful", a 2013 episode of television series Orphan Black
