= Élan (song) =

Single by Nightwish

from the album Endless Forms Most Beautiful
- B-side: "Sagan"
- Released: February 13, 2015
- Genre: Folk metal
- Length: 4:01 (radio edit); 4:48 (album version)
- Label: Oily Empire; Nuclear Blast
- Songwriter(s): Tuomas Holopainen
- Producer(s): Tuomas Holopainen

Nightwish singles chronology
"The Crow, the Owl and the Dove" (2012)	"Élan" (2015)	"Endless Forms Most Beautiful" (2015)

Music video
- "Élan" on YouTube

"Élan" is a single by the Finnish symphonic metal band Nightwish, the first from their eighth studio album, Endless Forms Most Beautiful. The song marks the first Nightwish song to feature its newest frontwoman, Dutch singer Floor Jansen, on vocals, and also the first to feature Troy Donockley as a full-time member and Kai Hahto as a temporary replacement for Jukka Nevalainen.

The song was announced on December 8, 2014 at the band's official website. According to keyboardist and songwriter Tuomas Holopainen, the song is "a wonderful teaser for the full-length album, giving out a little taste, but revealing very little of the actual journey of grandeur to come." The music video for the song features several famous Finnish actors and was "inspired by the untold stories of abandoned places around Finland".

The single also contains the song "Sagan", a bonus track not released on Endless Forms Most Beautiful. The song is about astrophysicist and science popularizer Carl Sagan. Tuomas said the band intended to include the track in the album track-list, but it would exceed the 80-minutes limit of a conventional CD, so they left the track out of it.

== Composition ==
According to Holopainen, the starting point to write the song was a citation by Walt Whitman (described by him as his "hero Uncle Walt"): "'Oh, while I live to be the ruler of life, Not a slave To meet life as a powerful conqueror, and nothing exterior to me will ever take command of me". He commented: "The underlying theme of the song is nothing less than the meaning of life, which can be something different for all of us. It's important to surrender yourself to the occasional 'free fall' and not to fear the path less travelled by." "Élan" was considered by bassist and vocalist Marko Hietala one of his favorite songs, and he sees it as a work that talks about living one's life to the fullest.

When asked about the meaning of the word "élan", Hietala said he heard from Holopainen that "it is a metaphor for this hunger and thirst for life, for the right here and now and the 'go at it and get it'."

== Leak controversy ==
The official debut date was February 13, 2015, though it was leaked online several days before. At that time, the band's official Facebook page posted a screenshot of a Mexican Facebook user supposedly making the song available via Google Drive. The post said "People, not like this please.", and it was met with criticism by some of the fans, who felt the band was exposing the user responsible for sharing the link, while others defended the group. A couple of hours later, the band released a statement on their Facebook page:

Our intention was not necessarily to attack an individual person, but to raise awareness that spreading unreleased property through internet is not something that any artist would like to see happen. This is about our musical property and the abuse of it, we are not anonymous, either. This kind of thing causes irreparable harm to countless people working in the music industry worldwide. Not only for the band.

The user responsible for publicizing the leak later changed his profile name and released a statement saying that he was now being harassed by many people and that Nightwish was to blame in case anything happens to him. The day after, Holopainen and the band released another statement:

The passionate posts on the bands Facebook page (which were done in the heat of the moment) were no doubt an honest reaction [...]. To suggest that the band or the record label would do this on purpose is very 'conspiracy theory' and simply not true. [...] This is a delicate issue, which seems to be very hard to address in a right way. We seriously hope everyone would calm down now. There's a lesson to be learned for all sides here.

On the day the single was officially released, Holopainen told Metal Hammer that he "would have done a few things differently" regarding the episode, but still regretted the song's premature leak. On a later interview, when asked if she sees a leak as something inevitable nowadays, Floor Jansen said "No, absolutely not". She also commented:

It's a criminal activity and it destroys a very well thought-out campaign, the anticipation that a lot of fans are having, and then it just comes too early, in a bad quality, and with nothing but negative energy around it. There is nothing good about that, and it's not something that should be normal, or that should be considered normal at all. [...] I was really, really furious, and even more so when people started asking me why I was so angry since it's something that usually happens, and that I should be happy that it 'only' happened a week before the planned release of the single, and that it wasn't the entire album. Happy? Really? I can't see it that way at all. [laughs]

== Track listing ==
CD version

No.	Title	Length
1.	"Élan"	4:48
2.	"Sagan" (Single-exclusive bonus track)	4:45
3.	"Élan" (Alternative version)	4:25
4.	"Élan" (Radio version)	4:01

Vinyl version

Side A
No.	Title	Length
1.	"Élan"	4:48
2.	"Sagan" (Single-exclusive bonus track)	4:45

Side B
No.	Title	Length
3.	"Élan" (Alternative version)	4:25
4.	"Élan" (Radio version)	4:01

== Personnel ==
Nightwish

- Floor Jansen – lead vocals
- Marko Hietala – bass, male vocals
- Emppu Vuorinen – guitars
- Tuomas Holopainen – keyboards
- Troy Donockley – uilleann pipes, tin whistle, backing vocals

Additional musicians

- Kai Hahto – drums
- Pip Williams – orchestral arrangements
- James Shearman – Conductor
- Metro Voices – choir

Production

- Tuomas Holopainen – production, mixing
- Mikko Karmilla, Tero Kinnunen – mixing
- Mika Jussila – mastering
- Toxic Angel – cover art

== Charts ==
Chart (2015)	Peak position
Austria (Ö3 Austria Top 40)	53
Finland (Suomen virallinen lista)	3
France (SNEP)	200
Germany (GfK)	33
Switzerland (Schweizer Hitparade)	33
