= Endless Forms Most Beautiful (song) =

Single by Nightwish

from the album Endless Forms Most Beautiful
- B-side: "Sagan" (instrumental version)
- Released: May 8, 2015
- Genre: Symphonic metal
- Length: 4:12 (radio edit); 5:07 (album version)
- Label: Nuclear Blast
- Songwriter(s): Tuomas Holopainen
- Producer(s): Tuomas Holopainen

Nightwish singles chronology
"Élan" (2015)	"Endless Forms Most Beautiful" (2015)	"Noise" (2020)

Lyric video
- "Endless Forms Most Beautiful" on YouTube

"Endless Forms Most Beautiful" is a song by the Finnish symphonic metal band Nightwish. It is the second single from their eighth album "Endless Forms Most Beautiful". The song was announced on April 17, 2015, alongside its release date and cover, and was eventually released on May 8, 2015 together with a lyric video.

According to band's bass player Marko Hietala, Endless Forms Most Beautiful was chosen for a single because the band wanted a heavier song for a single after Élan and it has a "simple structure, killer chorus and goes well for a video purpose." Keyboardist and songwriter Tuomas Holopainen commented that the song was heavily inspired by Richard Dawkins' book The Ancestor's Tale.

== Track listing ==
CD version

No.	Title	Length
1.	"Endless Forms Most Beautiful" (Album version)	5:08
2.	"Sagan" (Instrumental)	4:45
3.	"Endless Forms Most Beautiful" (Alternative version)	5:08
4.	"Endless Forms Most Beautiful" (Radio edit)	4:12

Vinyl version

Side A
No.	Title	Length
1.	"Endless Forms Most Beautiful" (Album version)	5:08
2.	"Sagan" (Instrumental)	4:45

Side B
No.	Title	Length
3.	"Endless Forms Most Beautiful" (Alternative version)	5:08
4.	"Endless Forms Most Beautiful" (Radio edit)	4:12

== Personnel ==
Nightwish

- Floor Jansen – lead vocals
- Marko Hietala – bass, vocals
- Emppu Vuorinen – guitars
- Tuomas Holopainen – keyboards
- Troy Donockley – uilleann pipes, tin whistle, backing vocals

Additional musicians

- Kai Hahto – drums
- Pip Williams – orchestral arrangements
- James Shearman – Conductor
- Metro Voices – choir
