= American Film Institute Awards =

Awards presented by the American Film Institute

- Awarded for: Top films and television programs
- Country: United States
- Presented by: American Film Institute
- First award: 2000
- Website: www.afi.com/afiawards

The American Film Institute Awards (also known as the AFI Awards) are awards presented by the American Film Institute to recognize the top ten films and television programs of the year. The AFI Awards honor ten American films and ten American television programs each year, selected by AFI as culturally and artistically representative of that year's significant achievements in moving-image storytelling.

Media that does not fit the AFI's conventional eligibility criteria for the main categories, such as non-American productions as well as other types of media, are given recognition through the AFI Special Award.

== 2000 ==
The 2000 AFI Awards honored the Top 10 Films of the year.

=== Top 10 Films ===
- Almost Famous
- Before Night Falls
- Best in Show
- Erin Brockovich
- Gladiator
- High Fidelity
- Requiem for a Dream
- Traffic
- Wonder Boys
- You Can Count on Me

== 2001 ==
The 2001 AFI Awards honored the best in film and television of the year. The nominations were announced on December 17, 2001, and the ceremony was broadcast on January 5, 2002, on CBS. It did not do well in the ratings (getting only 5.5 million viewers), so it would not be held in this format again. The AFI would go back to just listing the Top 10 Films and Top 10 Television Programs of the year, and not have any technical nor acting categories.

Each winner is in bold with the other nominees after:

=== Movies ===
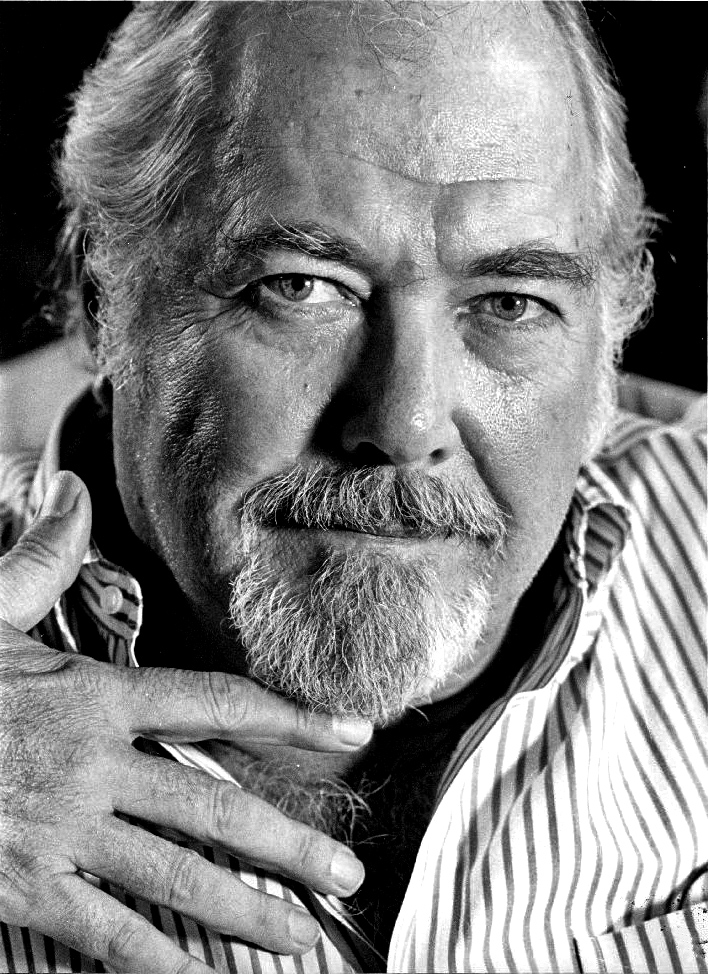
Robert Altman, Director of the Year winner

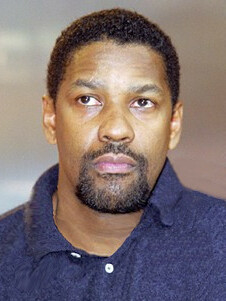
Denzel Washington, Actor of the Year – Male – Movies winner

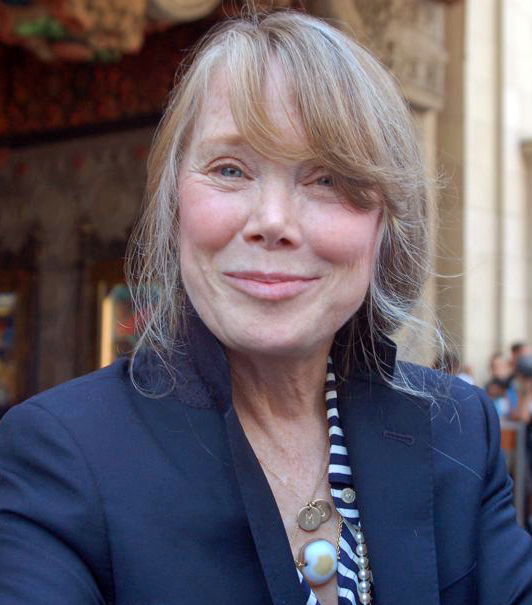
Sissy Spacek, Actress of the Year – Female – Movies winner

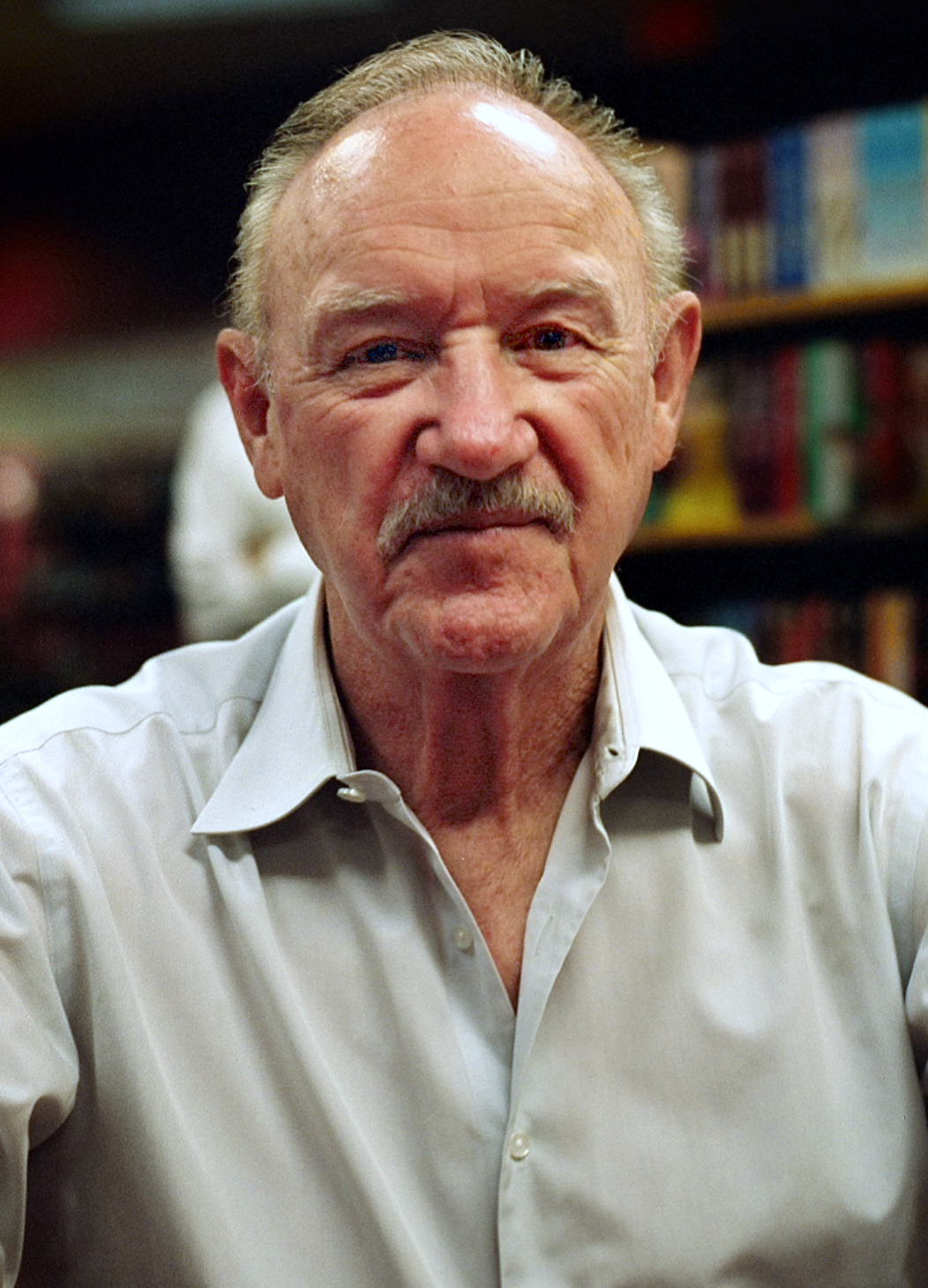
Gene Hackman, Featured Actor of the Year – Male – Movies winner

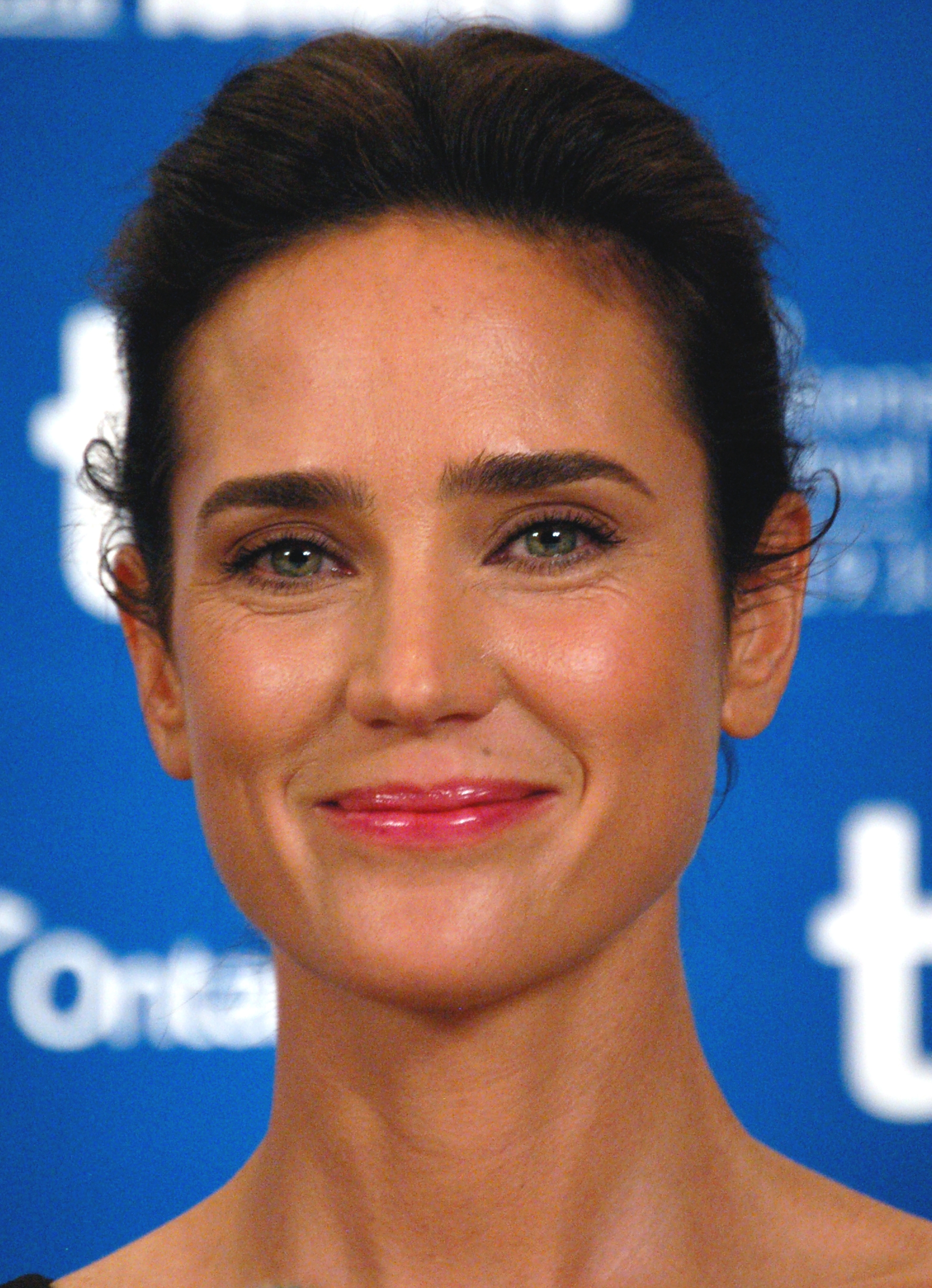
Jennifer Connelly, Featured Actress of the Year – Female – Movies winner

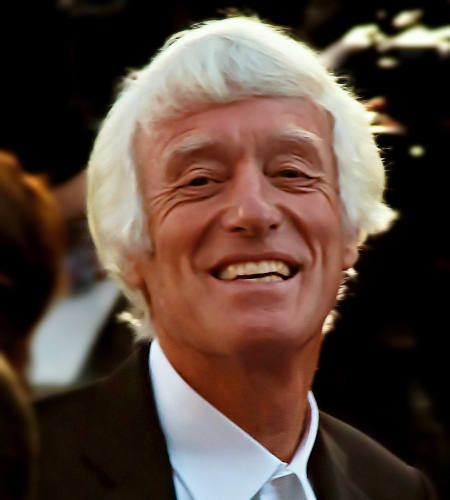
Roger Deakins, Cinematographer of the Year winner

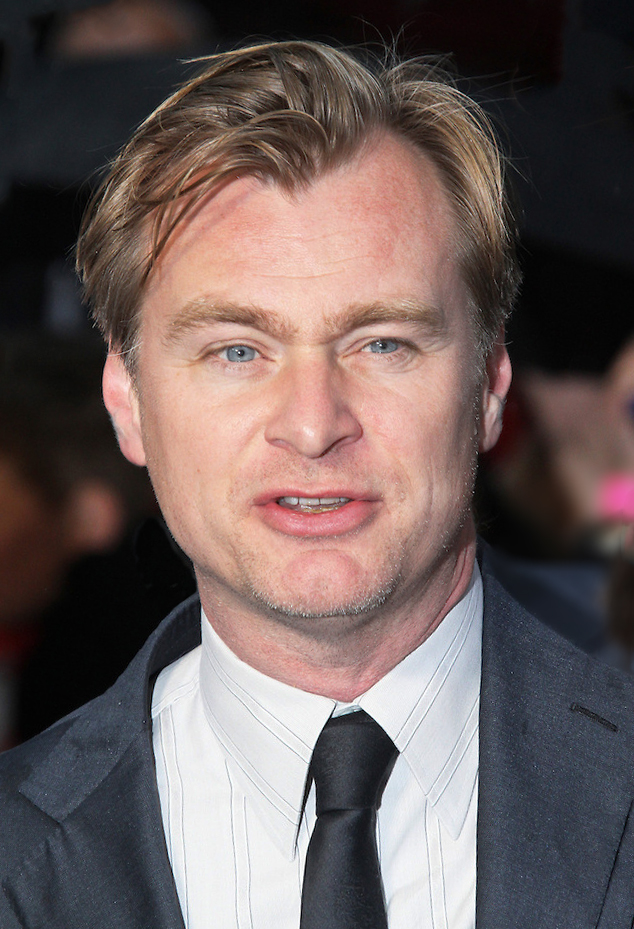
Christopher Nolan, Screenwriter of the Year winner

==== Movie of the Year ====
- **The Lord of the Rings: The Fellowship of the Ring**
  - A Beautiful Mind
  - Black Hawk Down
  - In the Bedroom
  - The Man Who Wasn't There
  - Memento
  - Monster's Ball
  - Moulin Rouge!
  - Mulholland Drive
  - Shrek

==== Director of the Year ====
- **Robert Altman – Gosford Park**
  - Todd Field – In the Bedroom
  - David Lynch – Mulholland Drive
  - Ridley Scott – Black Hawk Down

==== Actor of the Year – Male – Movies ====
- **Denzel Washington as Alonzo Harris – Training Day**
  - Russell Crowe as John Forbes Nash Jr. – A Beautiful Mind
  - Billy Bob Thornton as Ed Crane – The Man Who Wasn't There
  - Tom Wilkinson as Matt Fowler – In the Bedroom

==== Actor of the Year – Female – Movies ====
- **Sissy Spacek as Ruth Fowler – In the Bedroom**
  - Halle Berry as Leticia Musgrove – Monster's Ball
  - Stockard Channing as Julie Styron – The Business of Strangers
  - Naomi Watts as Betty Elms / Diane Selwyn – Mulholland Drive

==== Featured Actor of the Year – Male – Movies ====
- **Gene Hackman as Royal Tenenbaum – The Royal Tenenbaums**
  - Steve Buscemi as Seymour – Ghost World
  - Brian Cox as Big John Harrigan – L.I.E.
  - Tony Shalhoub as Freddy Riedenschneider – The Man Who Wasn't There

==== Featured Actor of the Year – Female – Movies ====
- **Jennifer Connelly as Alicia Nash – A Beautiful Mind**
  - Cate Blanchett as Kate Wheeler – Bandits
  - Cameron Diaz as Julianna "Julie" Gianni – Vanilla Sky
  - Frances O'Connor as Monica Swinton – A.I. Artificial Intelligence

==== Production Designer of the Year ====
- **Grant Major – The Lord of the Rings: The Fellowship of the Ring**
  - Stephen Altman – Gosford Park
  - Rick Carter – A.I. Artificial Intelligence
  - Arthur Max – Black Hawk Down

==== Digital Effects Artist of the Year ====
- **Jim Rygiel – The Lord of the Rings: The Fellowship of the Ring**
  - Nick Davis, Roger Guyett, and Robert Legato – Harry Potter and the Sorcerer's Stone
  - Scott Farrar and Dennis Muren – A.I. Artificial Intelligence
  - Bob Sabiston – Waking Life

==== Cinematographer of the Year ====
- **Roger Deakins – The Man Who Wasn't There**
  - Ericson Core – The Fast and the Furious
  - Sławomir Idziak – Black Hawk Down
  - Janusz Kamiński – A.I. Artificial Intelligence

==== Screenwriter of the Year ====
- **Christopher Nolan – Memento**
  - Daniel Clowes and Terry Zwigoff – Ghost World
  - Robert Festinger and Todd Field – In the Bedroom
  - Akiva Goldsman – A Beautiful Mind

==== Composer of the Year ====
- **Craig Armstrong – Moulin Rouge!**
  - Angelo Badalamenti – Mulholland Drive
  - Patrick Doyle – Gosford Park
  - Howard Shore – The Lord of the Rings: The Fellowship of the Ring

==== Editor of the Year ====
- **Jill Bilcock – Moulin Rouge!**
  - Dody Dorn – Memento
  - Pietro Scalia – Black Hawk Down
  - Tim Squyres – Gosford Park

=== Television ===
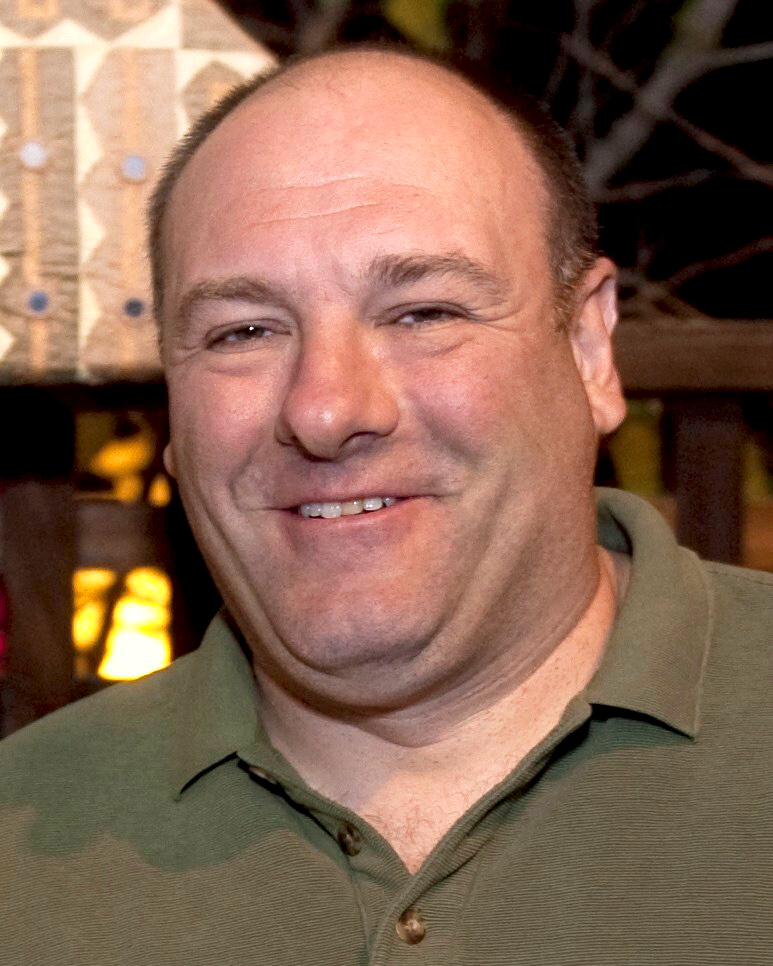
James Gandolfini, Actor of the Year – Male – TV Series winner

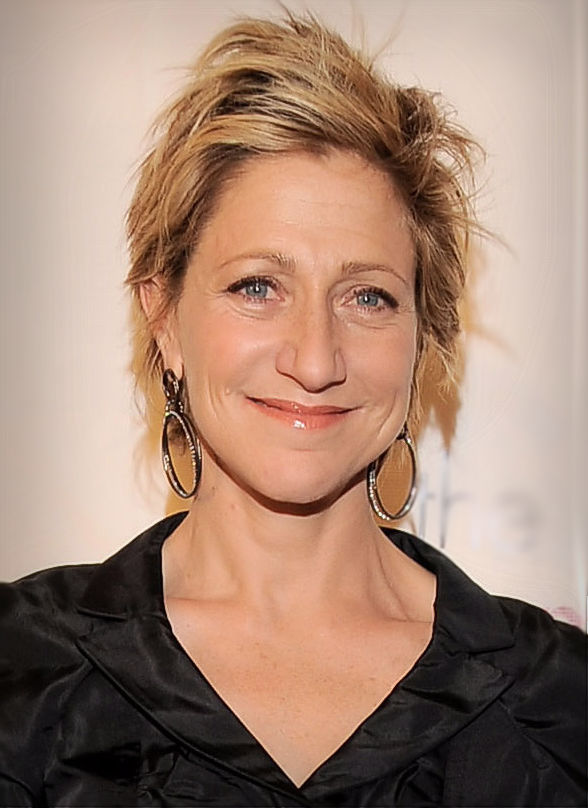
Edie Falco, Actor of the Year – Female – TV Series winner

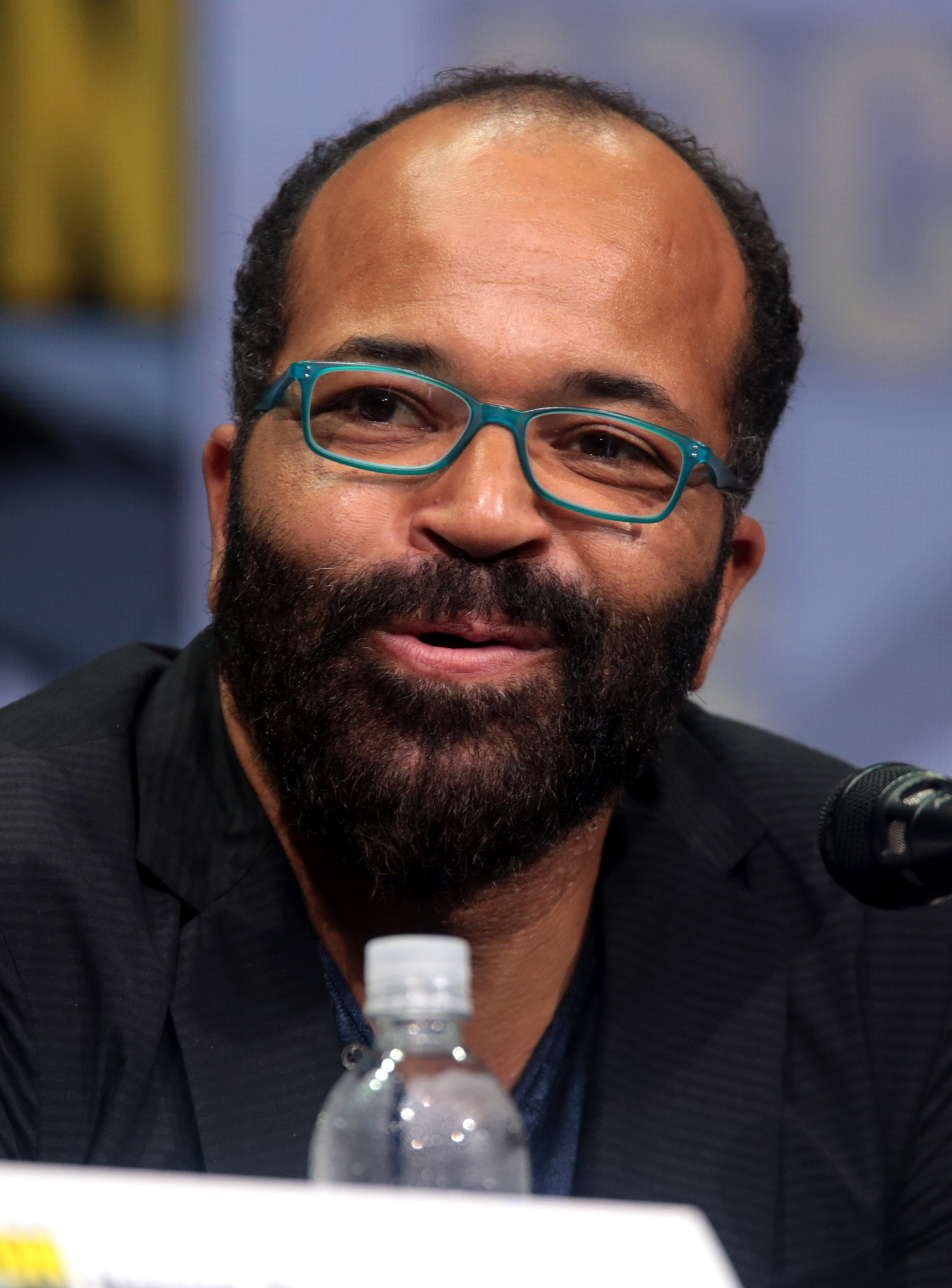
Jeffrey Wright, Actor of the Year – Male – TV Movie or Mini-Series winner

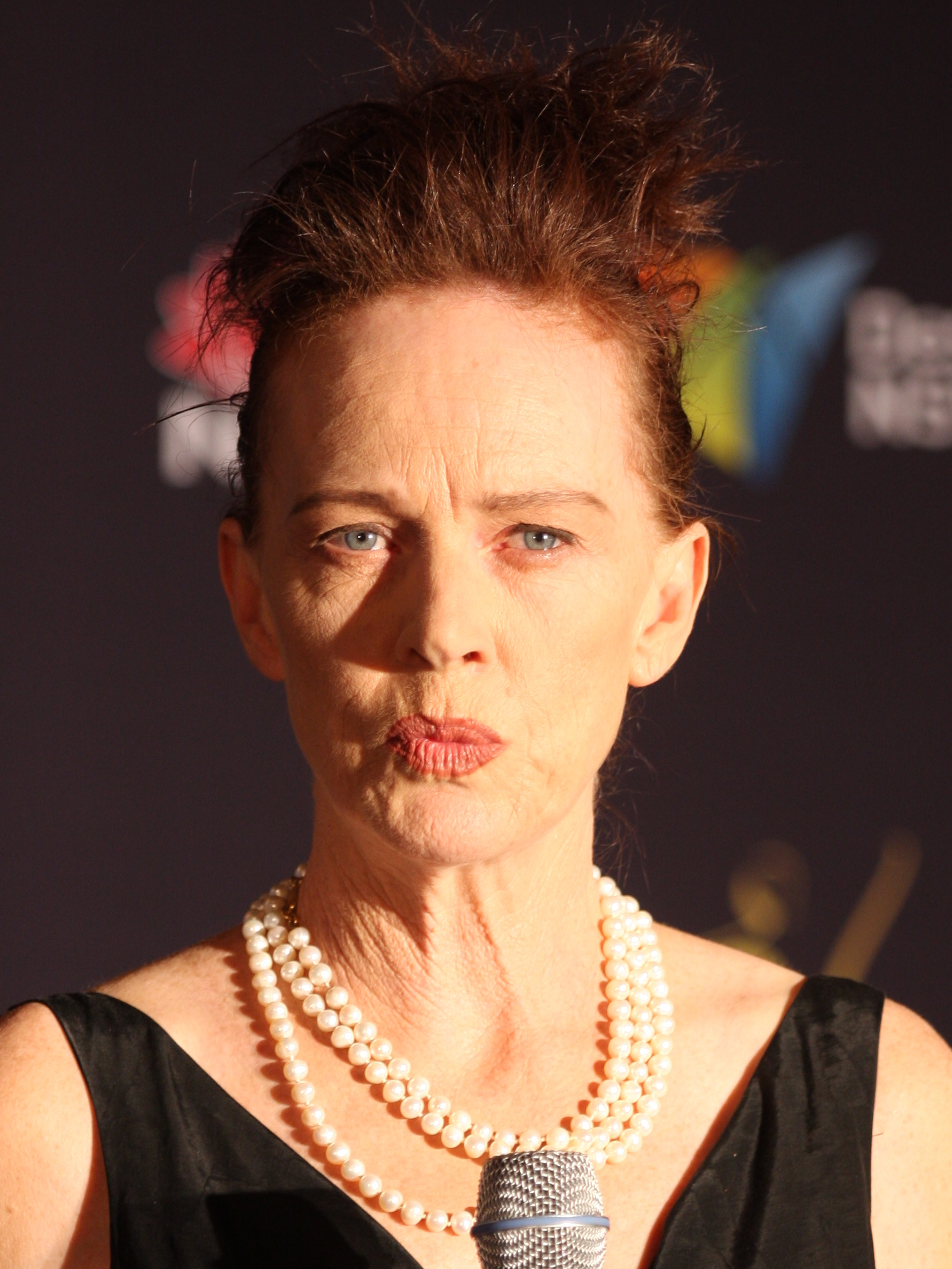
Judy Davis, Actor of the Year – Female – TV Movie or Mini-Series winner

==== Drama Series of the Year ====
- **The Sopranos (HBO)**
  - Buffy the Vampire Slayer (WB)
  - Six Feet Under (HBO)
  - The West Wing (NBC)

==== Comedy Series of the Year ====
- **Curb Your Enthusiasm (HBO)**
  - Everybody Loves Raymond (CBS)
  - Malcolm in the Middle (Fox)
  - Sex and the City (HBO)

==== Movie or Mini-Series of the Year ====
- **Band of Brothers (HBO)**
  - Anne Frank: The Whole Story (ABC)
  - Boycott (HBO)
  - Conspiracy (HBO)

==== Actor of the Year – Male – TV Series ====
- **James Gandolfini as Tony Soprano – The Sopranos**
  - Michael C. Hall as David Fisher – Six Feet Under
  - Chi McBride as Principal Steven Harper – Boston Public
  - Ray Romano as Raymond Barone – Everybody Loves Raymond

==== Actor of the Year – Female – TV Series ====
- **Edie Falco as Carmela Soprano – The Sopranos**
  - Allison Janney as C. J. Cregg – The West Wing
  - Jane Kaczmarek as Lois – Malcolm in the Middle
  - Doris Roberts as Marie Barone – Everybody Loves Raymond

==== Actor of the Year – Male – TV Movie or Mini-Series ====
- **Jeffrey Wright as Martin Luther King Jr. – Boycott**
  - Kenneth Branagh as Reinhard Heydrich – Conspiracy
  - Ben Kingsley as Otto Frank – Anne Frank: The Whole Story
  - Giovanni Ribisi as Mikal Gilmore – Shot in the Heart

==== Actor of the Year – Female – TV Movie or Mini-Series ====
- **Judy Davis as Judy Garland – Life with Judy Garland: Me and My Shadows**
  - Tammy Blanchard as Young Judy Garland – Life with Judy Garland: Me and My Shadows
  - Phylicia Rashad as Elizabeth – The Old Settler
  - Hannah Taylor-Gordon as Anne Frank – Anne Frank: The Whole Story

== 2002 ==
The 2002 AFI Awards honored the Top 10 Films and Top 10 Television Programs of the year.

=== Top 10 Films ===
- About a Boy
- About Schmidt
- Adaptation.
- Antwone Fisher
- Chicago
- Frida
- Gangs of New York
- The Hours
- The Lord of the Rings: The Two Towers
- The Quiet American

=== Top 10 Television Programs ===
- The Believer
- Boomtown
- Door to Door
- Everybody Loves Raymond
- The Gathering Storm
- Gilmore Girls
- The Simpsons
- Six Feet Under
- The Sopranos
- The West Wing

== 2003 ==
The 2003 AFI Awards honored the Top 10 Films and Top 10 Television Programs of the year.

=== Top 10 Films ===
- American Splendor
- Finding Nemo
- The Human Stain
- In America
- The Last Samurai
- The Lord of the Rings: The Return of the King
- Lost in Translation
- Master and Commander: The Far Side of the World
- Monster
- Mystic River

=== Top 10 Television Programs ===
- 24
- Alias
- Angels in America
- Arrested Development
- Everybody Loves Raymond
- Joan of Arcadia
- Nip/Tuck
- Playmakers
- Soldier's Girl
- The Wire

== 2004 ==
The 2004 AFI Awards honored the Top 10 Films and Top 10 Television Programs of the year.

=== Top 10 Films ===
- The Aviator
- Collateral
- Eternal Sunshine of the Spotless Mind
- Friday Night Lights
- The Incredibles
- Kinsey
- Maria Full of Grace
- Million Dollar Baby
- Sideways
- Spider-Man 2

=== Top 10 Television Programs ===
- Arrested Development
- Curb Your Enthusiasm
- Deadwood
- Desperate Housewives
- Lost
- Nip/Tuck
- The Shield
- Something the Lord Made
- The Sopranos
- South Park

== 2005 ==
The 2005 AFI Awards honored the Top 10 Films and Top 10 Television Programs of the year.

=== Top 10 Films ===
- The 40-Year-Old Virgin
- A History of Violence
- Brokeback Mountain
- Capote
- Crash
- Good Night, and Good Luck
- King Kong
- Munich
- The Squid and the Whale
- Syriana

=== Top 10 Television Programs ===
- 24
- Battlestar Galactica
- Deadwood
- Grey's Anatomy
- House
- Lost
- Rescue Me
- Sleeper Cell
- Sometimes in April
- Veronica Mars

== 2006 ==
The 2006 AFI Awards honored the Top 10 Films and Top 10 Television Programs of the year.

=== Top 10 Films ===
- Babel
- Borat: Cultural Learnings of America for Make Benefit Glorious Nation of Kazakhstan
- The Devil Wears Prada
- Dreamgirls
- Half Nelson
- Happy Feet
- Inside Man
- Letters from Iwo Jima
- Little Miss Sunshine
- United 93

=== Top 10 Television Programs ===
- 24
- Battlestar Galactica
- Dexter
- Elizabeth I
- Friday Night Lights
- Heroes
- The Office
- South Park
- The West Wing
- The Wire

=== Documentary ===
- Blindsight (Audience Award)

== 2007 ==
The 2007 AFI Awards honored the Top 10 Films and Top 10 Television Programs of the year.

=== Top 10 Films ===
- Before the Devil Knows You're Dead
- The Diving Bell and the Butterfly
- Into the Wild
- Juno
- Knocked Up
- Michael Clayton
- No Country for Old Men
- Ratatouille
- The Savages
- There Will Be Blood

=== Top 10 Television Programs ===
- 30 Rock
- Dexter
- Everybody Hates Chris
- Friday Night Lights
- Longford
- Mad Men
- Pushing Daisies
- The Sopranos
- Tell Me You Love Me
- Ugly Betty

=== Documentary ===
- Spine Tingler! The William Castle Story (Audience Award)

== 2008 ==
The 2008 AFI Awards honored the Top 10 Films and Top 10 Television Programs of the year.

=== Top 10 Films ===
- The Curious Case of Benjamin Button
- The Dark Knight
- Frost/Nixon
- Frozen River
- Gran Torino
- Iron Man
- Milk
- WALL-E
- Wendy and Lucy
- The Wrestler

=== Top 10 Television Programs ===
- Breaking Bad
- In Treatment
- John Adams
- Life
- Lost
- Mad Men
- The Office
- Recount
- The Shield
- The Wire

== 2009 ==
The 2009 AFI Awards honored the Top 10 Films and Top 10 Television Programs of the year.

=== Top 10 Films ===
- Coraline
- The Hangover
- The Hurt Locker
- The Messenger
- Precious: Based on the Novel 'Push' by Sapphire
- A Serious Man
- A Single Man
- Sugar
- Up
- Up in the Air

=== Top 10 Television Programs ===
- The Big Bang Theory
- Big Love
- Friday Night Lights
- Glee
- Mad Men
- Modern Family
- The No. 1 Ladies' Detective Agency
- Nurse Jackie
- Party Down
- True Blood

== 2010 ==
The 2010 AFI Awards honored the Top 10 Films and Top 10 Television Programs of the year.

=== Top 10 Films ===
- 127 Hours
- Black Swan
- The Fighter
- Inception
- The Kids Are All Right
- The Social Network
- The Town
- Toy Story 3
- True Grit
- Winter's Bone

=== Top 10 Television Programs ===
- 30 Rock
- The Big C
- Boardwalk Empire
- Breaking Bad
- Glee
- Mad Men
- Modern Family
- The Pacific
- Temple Grandin
- The Walking Dead

=== Special awards ===
- The King's Speech
- Waiting for "Superman"

== 2011 ==
The 2011 AFI Awards honored the Top 10 Films and Top 10 Television Programs of the year.

=== Top 10 Films ===
- Bridesmaids
- The Descendants
- The Girl with the Dragon Tattoo
- The Help
- Hugo
- J. Edgar
- Midnight in Paris
- Moneyball
- The Tree of Life
- War Horse

=== Top 10 Television Programs ===
- Boardwalk Empire
- Breaking Bad
- Curb Your Enthusiasm
- Game of Thrones
- The Good Wife
- Homeland
- Justified
- Louie
- Modern Family
- Parks and Recreation

=== Special awards ===
- The Artist
- Harry Potter

== 2012 ==
The 2012 AFI Awards honored the Top 10 Films and Top 10 Television Programs of the year.

=== Top 10 Films ===
- Argo
- Beasts of the Southern Wild
- The Dark Knight Rises
- Django Unchained
- Les Misérables
- Life of Pi
- Lincoln
- Moonrise Kingdom
- Silver Linings Playbook
- Zero Dark Thirty

=== Top 10 Television Programs ===
- American Horror Story: Asylum
- Breaking Bad
- Game Change
- Game of Thrones
- Girls
- Homeland
- Louie
- Mad Men
- Modern Family
- The Walking Dead

== 2013 ==
The 2013 AFI Awards honored the Top 10 Films and Top 10 Television Programs of the year.

=== Top 10 Films ===
- 12 Years a Slave
- American Hustle
- Captain Phillips
- Fruitvale Station
- Gravity
- Her
- Inside Llewyn Davis
- Nebraska
- Saving Mr. Banks
- The Wolf of Wall Street

=== Top 10 Television Programs ===
- The Americans
- Breaking Bad
- Game of Thrones
- The Good Wife
- House of Cards
- Mad Men
- Masters of Sex
- Orange Is the New Black
- Scandal
- Veep

== 2014 ==
The 2014 AFI Awards honored the Top 11 Films and Top 10 Television Programs of the year.

=== Top 11 Films ===
- American Sniper
- Birdman or (The Unexpected Virtue of Ignorance)
- Boyhood
- Foxcatcher
- The Imitation Game
- Interstellar
- Into the Woods
- Nightcrawler
- Selma
- Unbroken
- Whiplash

=== Top 10 Television Programs ===
- The Americans
- Fargo
- Game of Thrones
- How to Get Away with Murder
- Jane the Virgin
- The Knick
- Mad Men
- Orange Is the New Black
- Silicon Valley
- Transparent

== 2015 ==
The 2015 AFI Awards honored the Top 10 Films and Top 10 Television Programs of the year.

=== Top 10 Films ===
- The Big Short
- Bridge of Spies
- Carol
- Inside Out
- Mad Max: Fury Road
- The Martian
- Room
- Spotlight
- Star Wars: The Force Awakens
- Straight Outta Compton

=== Top 10 Television Programs ===
- The Americans
- Better Call Saul
- Black-ish
- Empire
- Fargo
- Game of Thrones
- Homeland
- Master of None
- Mr. Robot
- UnREAL

=== Special Award ===
The AFI Special Award was given to Mad Men, which for "its contributions to America's cultural legacy". The show has been listed in AFI's awards list seven times.

== 2016 ==
The 2016 AFI Awards honored the Top 10 Films and Top 10 Television Programs of the year.

=== Top 10 Films ===
- Arrival
- Fences
- Hacksaw Ridge
- Hell or High Water
- La La Land
- Manchester by the Sea
- Moonlight
- Silence
- Sully
- Zootopia

=== Top 10 Television Programs ===
- The Americans
- Atlanta
- Better Call Saul
- The Crown
- Game of Thrones
- The Night Of
- The People v. O.J. Simpson: American Crime Story
- Stranger Things
- This Is Us
- Veep

=== Special Award ===
- O.J.: Made in America

== 2017 ==
The 2017 AFI Awards honored the Top 10 Films and Top 10 Television Programs of the year.

=== Top 10 Films ===
- The Big Sick
- Call Me by Your Name
- Dunkirk
- The Florida Project
- Get Out
- Lady Bird
- The Post
- The Shape of Water
- Three Billboards Outside Ebbing, Missouri
- Wonder Woman

=== Top 10 Television Programs ===
- Big Little Lies
- The Crown
- Feud: Bette and Joan
- Game of Thrones
- The Good Place
- The Handmaid's Tale
- Insecure
- Master of None
- Stranger Things
- This Is Us

=== AFI Special Award ===
- The Vietnam War

== 2018 ==
The 2018 AFI Awards honored the Top 10 Films and Top 10 Television Programs of the year.

=== Top 10 Films ===
- Black Panther
- BlacKkKlansman
- Eighth Grade
- The Favourite
- First Reformed
- Green Book
- If Beale Street Could Talk
- Mary Poppins Returns
- A Quiet Place
- A Star Is Born

=== Top 10 Television Programs ===
- The Americans
- The Assassination of Gianni Versace: American Crime Story
- Atlanta
- Barry
- Better Call Saul
- The Kominsky Method
- The Marvelous Mrs. Maisel
- Pose
- Succession
- This Is Us

=== AFI Special Award ===
- Roma

== 2019 ==
The 2019 AFI Awards honored the Top 10 Films and Top 10 Television Programs of the year. The winners were announced on December 4, 2019, while the ceremony was held on January 3, 2020.

=== Top 10 Films ===
- 1917
- The Farewell
- The Irishman
- Jojo Rabbit
- Joker
- Knives Out
- Little Women
- Marriage Story
- Once Upon a Time in Hollywood
- Richard Jewell

=== Top 10 Television Programs ===
- Chernobyl
- The Crown
- Fosse/Verdon
- Game of Thrones
- Pose
- Succession
- Unbelievable
- Veep
- Watchmen
- When They See Us

=== AFI Special Award ===
- Parasite
- Fleabag

== 2020 ==
The 2020 AFI Awards were announced on January 25, 2021, and the selections were honored in a virtual event on February 26, 2021. The juries were led by Jeanine Basinger and Richard Frank.

=== Top 10 Films ===
- Da 5 Bloods
- Judas and the Black Messiah (a 2021 film)
- Ma Rainey's Black Bottom
- Mank
- Minari
- Nomadland
- One Night in Miami...
- Soul
- Sound of Metal
- The Trial of the Chicago 7

=== Top 10 Television Programs ===
- Better Call Saul
- Bridgerton
- The Crown
- The Good Lord Bird
- Lovecraft Country
- The Mandalorian
- Mrs. America
- The Queen's Gambit
- Ted Lasso
- Unorthodox

=== AFI Special Award ===
- Hamilton

== 2021 ==
The 2021 AFI Awards were announced on December 8, 2021. The ceremony was scheduled to be held on January 7, 2022, but was postponed to March 11, 2022, due to COVID-19.

=== Top 10 Films ===
- CODA
- Don't Look Up
- Dune
- King Richard
- Licorice Pizza
- Nightmare Alley
- The Power of the Dog
- Tick, Tick... Boom!
- The Tragedy of Macbeth
- West Side Story

=== Top 10 Television Programs ===
- Hacks
- Maid
- Mare of Easttown
- Reservation Dogs
- Schmigadoon!
- Succession
- Ted Lasso
- The Underground Railroad
- WandaVision
- The White Lotus

=== AFI Special Award ===
- Belfast
- Squid Game
- Summer of Soul

== 2022 ==
The 2022 AFI Awards were announced on December 9, 2022. The juries were led by Jeanine Basinger and Richard Frank.

=== Top 10 Films ===
- Avatar: The Way of Water
- Elvis
- Everything Everywhere All at Once
- The Fabelmans
- Nope
- She Said
- Tár
- Top Gun: Maverick
- The Woman King
- Women Talking

=== Top 10 Television Programs ===
- Abbott Elementary
- The Bear
- Better Call Saul
- Hacks
- Mo
- Pachinko
- Reservation Dogs
- Severance
- Somebody Somewhere
- The White Lotus

=== AFI Special Award ===
- The Banshees of Inisherin

== 2023 ==
The 2023 AFI Awards were announced on December 7, 2023.

=== Top 10 Films ===
- American Fiction
- Barbie
- The Holdovers
- Killers of the Flower Moon
- Maestro
- May December
- Oppenheimer
- Past Lives
- Poor Things
- Spider-Man: Across the Spider-Verse

=== Top 10 Television Programs ===
- Abbott Elementary
- The Bear
- Beef
- Jury Duty
- The Last of Us
- The Morning Show
- Only Murders in the Building
- Poker Face
- Reservation Dogs
- Succession

== 2024 ==
The 2024 AFI Awards were announced on December 5, 2024.

=== Top 10 Films ===
- Anora
- The Brutalist
- A Complete Unknown
- Conclave
- Dune: Part Two
- Emilia Pérez
- Nickel Boys
- A Real Pain
- Sing Sing
- Wicked

=== Top 10 Television Programs ===
- Abbott Elementary
- The Bear
- Hacks
- A Man on the Inside
- Mr. & Mrs. Smith
- Nobody Wants This
- The Penguin
- Shōgun
- Shrinking
- True Detective: Night Country

=== AFI Special Award ===
- Baby Reindeer

== 2025 ==
The 2025 AFI Awards were announced on December 4, 2025.

=== Top 10 Films ===
- Avatar: Fire and Ash
- Bugonia
- Frankenstein
- Hamnet
- Jay Kelly
- Marty Supreme
- One Battle After Another
- Sinners
- Train Dreams
- Wicked: For Good

=== Top 10 Television Programs ===
- Adolescence
- Andor
- Death by Lightning
- The Diplomat
- The Lowdown
- The Pitt
- Pluribus
- Severance
- The Studio
- Task

=== AFI Special Award ===
- It Was Just an Accident

== Records ==
Game of Thrones earned eight mentions over its run, setting a new record. It also became the first and only continuing series to be awarded for all of its eligible seasons.

There have only been thirteen animated films to be officially listed at the AFIAs.

- Shrek (2001)
- Finding Nemo (2003)
- The Incredibles (2004)
- Happy Feet (2006)
- Ratatouille (2007)
- WALL-E (2008)
- Coraline and Up (both 2009)
- Toy Story 3 (2010)
- Inside Out (2015)
- Zootopia (2016)
- Soul (2020)
- Spider Man: Across the Spider-Verse (2023)

There have only been two animated television programs to be officially listed at the AFIAs.

- The Simpsons (2002)
- South Park (2004, 2006)

There have only been seven (both partially and wholly) non-English-language films to be officially listed at the AFIAs.

- Maria Full of Grace (2004)
- Babel and Letters from Iwo Jima (both 2006)
- The Farewell (2019)
- Minari (2020)
- Past Lives (2023)
- Emilia Pérez (2024)

There have only been two (both partially and wholly) non-English-language television programs to be officially listed at the AFIAs.

- Pachinko (2022)
- Shōgun (2024)
