= Harry Potter and the Goblet of Fire (disambiguation) =

Harry Potter and the Goblet of Fire is a novel by J. K. Rowling.

Harry Potter and the Goblet of Fire may also refer to:

- Harry Potter and the Goblet of Fire (film), the novel's film adaptation, directed by Mike Newell
- Harry Potter and the Goblet of Fire (soundtrack), the soundtrack based on the film, composed by Patrick Doyle
- Harry Potter and the Goblet of Fire (video game), a video game based on the film
