= Endless Forms Most Beautiful (album) =

2015 studio album by Nightwish

Studio album by Nightwish
- Released: 25 March 2015
- Recorded: August–October 2014
- Studios: Röskö Campsite (Kitee); Petrax (Hollola); Angel (London); Hats Off (Oxfordshire)
- Genre: Symphonic metal
- Length: 78:36
- Label: Nuclear Blast
- Producer: Tuomas Holopainen

Nightwish studio album chronology
Imaginaerum (2011)	Endless Forms Most Beautiful (2015)	Human. :II: Nature. (2020)

Singles from Endless Forms Most Beautiful
- 1. "Élan" Released: 13 February 2015; 2. "Endless Forms Most Beautiful" Released: 8 May 2015

Endless Forms Most Beautiful is the eighth studio album by the Finnish symphonic metal band Nightwish. It was released on 25 March 2015 in Japan, 27 March in Argentina and most of Europe, 30 March in the UK and 31 March in the US. The album is the band's first featuring singer Floor Jansen and the first with Troy Donockley as a full-time member. It was also the first without drummer Jukka Nevalainen, who took a break from the band due to severe insomnia. Drumming was provided by Kai Hahto of Wintersun and Swallow the Sun. The album includes only five Nightwish members, despite its being their first album release as a sextet.

Unlike its predecessor Imaginaerum, which has themes of imagination and fantasy, Endless Forms Most Beautiful addresses science and reason. Focusing on the evolutionary theories of Charles Darwin and Richard Dawkins, the latter part of the album cites passages from their books. Both authors influenced album tracks; The Ancestor's Tale inspired "Endless Forms Most Beautiful", and The Greatest Show on Earth: The Evidence for Evolution inspired "The Greatest Show on Earth". Some songs, such as "Edema Ruh" (inspired by Patrick Rothfuss' novel The Name of the Wind), still have fanciful themes.

The album's first single, "Élan", was introduced on 9 February 2015 (four days before its planned release date). "Endless Forms Most Beautiful", was announced as the second single on 17 April, and was later released with a lyric video on 8 May.

== Background ==
After releasing Imaginaerum in late 2011, the band began the Imaginaerum Tour in January 2012 with Anette Olzon as a vocalist and Troy Donockley as an unofficial member. On 28 September, before a show in Denver, Olzon became ill and was replaced by Elize Ryd and Alissa White-Gluz (vocalists for Amaranthe and The Agonist, respectively). The next day, Olzon gave her final performance with Nightwish in Salt Lake City.

A day later, Olzon posted on her blog that she disliked being replaced by Ryd and White-Gluz without being consulted: the following morning, she was fired. In the statement announcing Olzon's departure, Nightwish introduced Floor Jansen as her replacement for the rest of the tour.

In October 2013, after the tour, the band announced that Jansen and Donockley were official members. The album was introduced in May 2014, when Holopainen posted on his website that it would probably be ready at the end of January 2015 and demos would be circulated beginning in July 2015.

== Production ==
=== Concept ===
Endless Forms Most Beautiful was primarily inspired by the work of naturalist Charles Darwin. According to songwriter Tuomas Holopainen, the album's title is drawn from the last paragraph of Darwin's 1859 book On the Origin of Species which included the words "endless forms most beautiful" to describe evolution from one common ancestor to all living organisms:

There is grandeur in this view of life, with its several powers, having been originally breathed into a few forms or into one; and that, whilst this planet has gone cycling on according to the fixed law of gravity, from so simple a beginning endless forms most beautiful and most wonderful have been, and are being, evolved.

— Charles Darwin, On the Origin of Species

Titles such as Élan and The Greatest Show on Earth were considered for the album, but Holopainen considered the latter too "pompous" and the band eventually opted for Endless Forms Most Beautiful.

Tuomas said that he would like fans to listen to the album from beginning to the end (like watching a movie), rather than listening to random songs. According to Tuomas, Endless Forms Most Beautiful has a "very loose" concept: "It's all about beauty of life, the beauty of existence, nature, science". He likened it to Imaginaerum: "The previous album was a tribute to the power of imagination. Endless Forms Most Beautiful would be an equal tribute to science and the power of reason".

=== Songwriting ===
Like every Nightwish album, Endless Forms Most Beautiful was primarily written by Tuomas Holopainen with (as since 2002) singer and bassist Marko Hietala secondary songwriter. Some of Hietala's lyrics appeared on the album. About the songs after recording a first demo, Holopainen said: "It's still too early to analyze the material more closely, but the album will once again explore all the ends of the spectrum, bringing the very best out of the newcomers Floor [Jansen] and Troy [Donockley]. And stealthily the album ended up having a theme running through it." Holopainen composed the new album while he was writing the songs for his first solo album, Music Inspired by the Life and Times of Scrooge. He worked mainly late at night and in the morning: "I think I haven't written a song after 6 pm for this album".

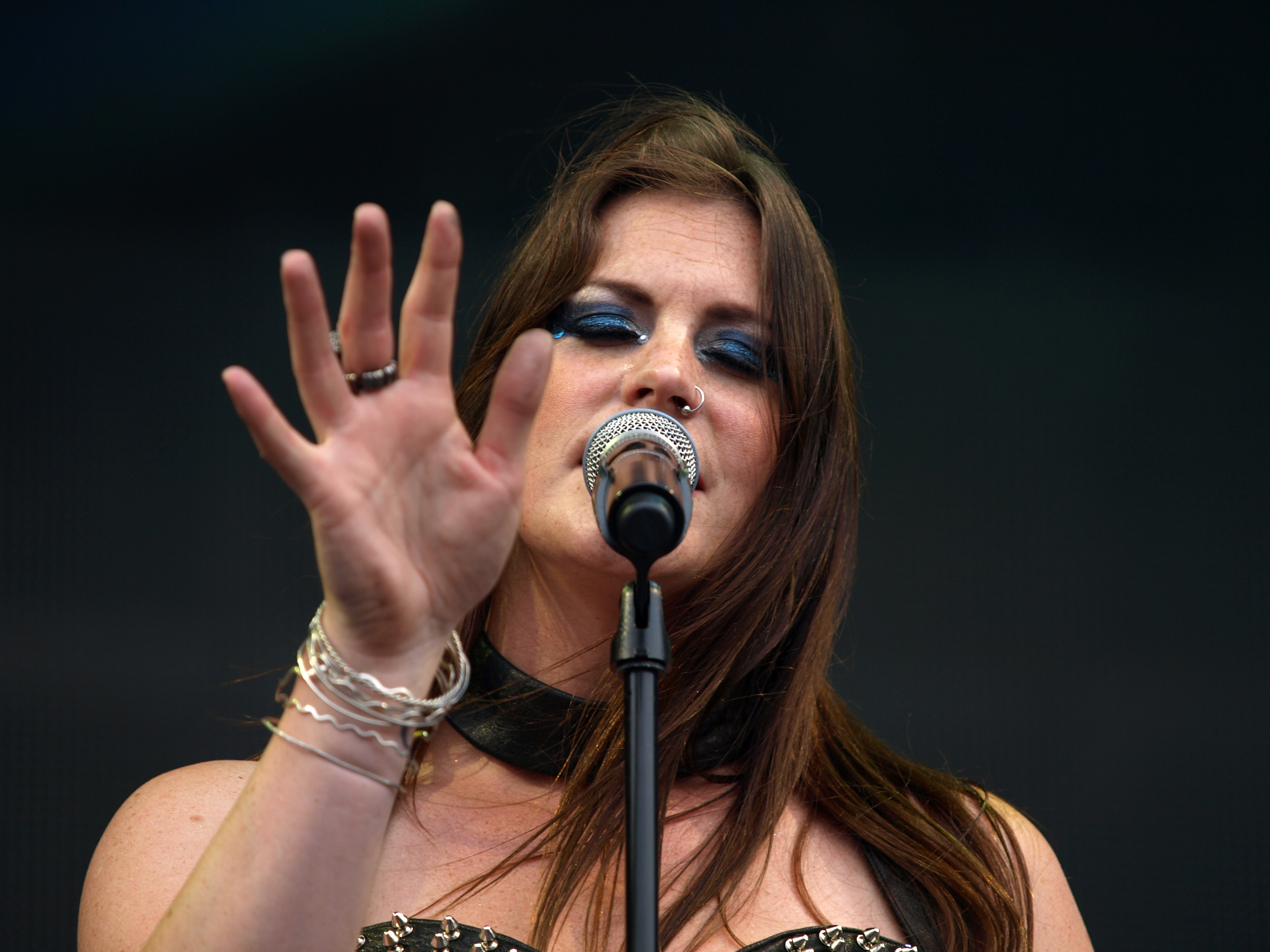
Endless Forms Most Beautiful is the first Nightwish album featuring Floor Jansen (pictured).

New members Jansen and Donockley discussed their roles in the new album; Jansen said, "[Holopainen's] style didn't change of course, but there are things that he hears me singing as well as for example Troy and Marko, and you can just feel that those parts really fit, and at the same time he's triggering me to do new things, so I'm gonna also find new, you know, sounds and borders within my sound, and 'Let's just try this!', and usually, you know, it just fits." Holopainen "challenged me using everything I have to offer. High, low, soft, whatever, but definitely lower stuff and very soft and intimate things." Asked if the album would include operatic singing, Jansen replied: "Yes, but not so much"; the band experimented with many different styles, including occasional operatic backing vocals. Holopainen later confirmed challenging the singer, since he thought her voice could accommodate heavier and softer songs. In another interview, he said that the band tried operatic vocals in some of the songs but "it just didn't feel right. We felt that these stories, these songs, don't really require that style of singing. It felt like the right approach to all of us, including Floor, that we should get rid of it mostly. It's very important to be humble before the songs so that you don't do things just because you can – or just to show off when it comes to singing, solos or whatever."

Despite being a composer and lyricist in her former band After Forever and her other band at the time, ReVamp, Jansen was not a part of the songwriting process for her first Nightwish album: "I don't feel the necessity of me being an active songwriting member, because the music is so good. It's about the songs and the music that goes first and not about my ego wanting to join like that. But if I can participate or add something with my creative input, of course I would love that. Of course, I have creative energy in me that needs to come out one way or another, but that's where ReVamp comes in." According to Holopainen, "She will bring a lot of interpretations, some arrangements and positive energy for sure." Donockley said about his role, "[Holopainen] writes with challenging parts, you know, especially for the pipes, because the pipes are very much a part of a style and a tradition, so it's always nice for me to really push the boundaries of the instrument. But it's not to saturation point, you know, it's not pipes over every song."

The album's style has been described by Nightwish as "more band-focused". Guitarist Emppu Vuorinen said soon after rehearsals began, "I don't know if it has something to do with age – but the need to show off has diminished even more. It's more like you want to do justice to the song and not strut your stuff." Holopainen called it heavier than its two predecessors, citing "Weak Fantasy", "Yours Is an Empty Hope" and the title song, with more prominent bass and guitars. Jansen called it a "100-percent Nightwish" album.

=== Recording ===
Holopainen, Hietala and audio engineer Tero (TeeCee) Kinnunen recorded a 12-song demo from late April to 14 May 2014. The band began rehearsing and recording over the following months in Eno, Finland, in a rented "cabin" in an isolated area of snow and trees they called "summer camp". According to the album booklet, the location was Röskö Campsite. Nightwish went straight from rehearsals to recording, according to Jansen, "so that whole band-vibe was also put into the recordings".

About their work environment, Donockley said: "It's hard to describe, the peace, the stillness, the geology, the biology of the place ... I've never seen anything like this. It's a wondrous place". According to Jansen, "I am very sensitive about environment. Don't put me in the middle of a city and maybe super shiny, fantastic studio and keep me inspired for weeks. But a place like this does. I love nature and I love calm. We can work for hours and then you can relax." Hietala outlined the pros and cons of the "summer camp" compared with a recording studio: "It's nice, everything set up and we can record whenever we want. When we have something ready, we can just record it and listen to it ... Actual studios are safer in the way that they are soundproofed. You don't have to worry about outside noise. [Here], if there's a thunderclap, you can hear it on the vocal track". Jansen said, "We all had our little cabin where we could sleep and have some privacy if we wanted to, which also allowed us to have our spouses, children, friends or whatever just coming around. In one of the main houses we built a rehearsal studio, and upstairs from that the recording studio. In the beginning of July we started rehearsing, and even though first they wanted to start with the instrumental base, I visited just out of curiosity. It was just so cool that I just stayed, which gave us even more time to go into details in regards to the vocals, something relatively new for Nightwish to do during the rehearsals."

On 6 August 2014, drummer Jukka Nevalainen announced that he would not be part of the upcoming album and tour due to severe insomnia. It would be the first Nightwish album without him: "During the last month, it has become evident for me that due to my insomnia, I can't fulfill my duties as a musician in the way that I'd want and with the precision that the music deserves. Thus I have decided to step aside from my duties as the drummer of Nightwish during the recording of the forthcoming album and the subsequent tour. I will still be involved in managing the day-to-day affairs of the band, but the dearest and the most important thing, playing, is, for the time being, not possible. Time will tell what the future holds. On a personal level, my decision obviously feels indescribably sad. Fortunately, looking at it with some distance, it is 'just' part of the constant, inevitable ebb and flow of life." Nevalainen said that his good friend Kai Hahto, drummer for melodic death metal bands Wintersun and Swallow the Sun and a longtime Nightwish drum technician, would be his replacement on the album.

On 24 August the band reported that the drum recording was done. They subsequently announced the finished recordings of other instruments: bass on 1 September, guitars on 6 September, and Jansen and Hietala's vocals on 26 September. Holopainen was surprised that the recording finished ahead of schedule: "I think it was because everything was so well-rehearsed this time. We've tried to work more like a band." On 28 September Nightwish reported that they were leaving the "summer camp" after three months of work for London to record the orchestra, choirs, and percussion.

On 8 October Nightwish recorded with Pip Williams and the orchestra at Angel Recording Studios. Jansen, who had never worked with an orchestra before, said that she was "stunned by the professionalism of the players, the conductor James Shearman, the studio engineers and by the amazing arrangements Pip made". On 14 October they were still in London, recording choir ensembles (including the Metro Voices) and percussion instruments. According to Holopainen, "This must be the sixth or seventh time we're working with these people. We've realized what they can do during these years. So it's really not a surprise any more but it hasn't ceased to amaze me. The level of professionalism is just unbelievable. But even more importantly, they clearly like what they're doing. The guys we've worked with for over 10 years are still up for it."

On 16 October Nightwish announced that evolutionary biologist and author Richard Dawkins would be a guest on the album. Holopainen wrote a letter to Dawkins, who answered two weeks later by email that he had never heard of the band; he became interested after listening to some of their songs on the Internet. His parts of the song "The Greatest Show on Earth" were recorded by Michael Taylor at Hats Off Studios in Oxford. Dawkins recorded narrations of writings by Carl Sagan, Walt Whitman, Darwin, Holopainen and himself; not all were used in the album, but Holopainen said he planned to incorporate others into the live show. Holopainen got to know more about Dawkin's work after Donockley introduced him to his books, all of which were read by Holopainen, except An Appetite for Wonder.

The album's mixing, by Holopainen and longtime collaborators Mikko Karmila and Tero Kinnunen, began on 29 October 2014. On 16 December Nightwish reported that mixing was finished. It was mastered by Mika Jussila at Finnvox in January 2015.

== Songs ==
"Shudder Before the Beautiful" opens with a quote by Richard Dawkins, and its lyrics include the "beauty of the world and everything it has to offer". Reminding Holopainen of Once and Oceanborn, it features the first duel between him and guitarist Emppu Vuorinen in about 15 years. "Weak Fantasy", primarily written by Hietala, is considered the album's heaviest song by Holopainen. Its lyrics, which criticize how some religions restrict lives, were also co-written by Hietala (who contributed to an originally-instrumental (and acoustic guitar-centered) part of the song which the band felt was too long). On a later interview in 2016, he commented further on the song, stating that it is "a combination of an interesting metal song with a few interesting parts that dabble in Celtic folk with the acoustic guitars." During live performances, the message "wake up or die" is shown at the screen behind the band. Donockley said the words were taken from the film Religulous, which is a favorite of him and Holopainen.

"Élan" is about "the meaning of life, which can be something different for all of us. It's important to surrender yourself to the occasional 'free fall' and not to fear the path less travelled by." Not intended for the album's track list, Holopainen liked the song more after the band began working on it. Following a suggestion by Donockley and Hietala, he replaced "Edema Ruh" with "Élan" as the album's first single. Although he was initially uncertain about recording "Yours Is an Empty Hope" (co-written by Hietala and also called one of the album's heaviest songs), Holopainen found its subject matter "inspirational". He refrained from explicating its lyrics because he did not want to "ruin" listener interpretations. According to Hietala, the song explores "living the 'here and now', not 'then'."

"Our Decades in the Sun" is a ballad for the band's parents. Holopainen said that it was "maybe the most difficult song to put together" because of its delicacy and intimacy, and band members wept while rehearsing and recording it. "My Walden", a Celtic song with a prominent contribution from Donockley, was considered by Holopainen a continuation of "I Want My Tears Back" from Imaginaerum. It is inspired by the book Walden written by Henry David Thoreau. "Endless Forms Most Beautiful" is inspired by Dawkins' book, The Ancestor's Tale, and "Edema Ruh" refers to the group of traveling minstrels in Patrick Rothfuss's The Name of the Wind; it was the first song written for the album.

"Alpenglow" has been called the "ultimate Nightwish song" by Holopainen, who referred to it as "a nice little interlude" with "a catchy chorus and toxic guitar riff". He also stated that it is the result of him wanting to write a love song for the album with the particular aim to find a new angle for storytelling, contrasting that there are enough "awfulnesses" like Bon Jovi’s "Always" already in existence. According to Holopainen, the most important secret to approach universal themes such as wonder, longing or death is to always find new ways to translate the respective emotions and stories into music.

"The Eyes of Sharbat Gula", an instrumental planned with lyrics, was written by Holopainen after he bought an issue of National Geographic with a reproduction of the iconic photo of Sharbat Gula. He said that the photograph "just made a huge impact on me. Those eyes, those wild, untamed and at the same time fearless and fearful eyes. I want to capture the essence of that photo in one of the songs". The song was intended to be about children in war, but he struggled with its lyrics. After a suggestion by Donockley, Holopainen decided to add only distant voices and a children's choir and said that it works as an intermission between the first part of the album and the final track.

"The Greatest Show on Earth", the longest Nightwish song to date, refers to "life and evolution by natural selection" similarly to Richard Dawkins' book with the same title, from where the song title comes. There are also two quotes spoken from the first chapter of Unweaving the Rainbow by Dawkins as well as the closing thoughts from On the Origin of Species by Darwin. The song features short excerpts from Dies Irae, Minuet in G major by Christian Petzold, Toccata and Fugue in D minor, BWV 565 by Johann Sebastian Bach and Enter Sandman by Metallica, accompanied with a Tibetan chant sung by male parts of the choir which are probably references to the evolution of music and arts as part of evolution of the human race. Holopainen said that the band is unlikely to play the full song live, but may perform a "band section" in the middle. During live performances, photographs of people are shown in the screen behind the band; most are stock pictures, but some depict members' relatives. Calling it "the most ambitious thing we ever did", he said the song was originally over 30 minutes long. According to Holopainen, the album is "nine great support acts ... one intermission and then the main act" ("The Greatest Show on Earth"). Hietala also said the song "is probably the culmination of everything that we've done together".

== Release, reception and legacy ==
Professional ratings
Review scores
Source	Rating
AllMusic	4/5 stars
About.com	4/5 stars
Blabbermouth.net	8.5/10 stars
Dangerdog Music Reviews	4.5/5 stars
The Guardian	4/5 stars
Metal Storm	8.5/10 stars
MusicReviewRadar	4/5
Ultimate Guitar	8/10 stars

Endless Forms Most Beautiful was released in late March 2015. It was first released in Japan on March 25, in continental Europe and Argentina on March 27, in the UK on March 30, and in the United States on March 31. In addition to a regular edition with 11 tracks, released on CD and as a digital download, the album was released as a double LP in different colors, a digibook edition with an instrumental CD, and two earbook editions. One earbook version included a CDs with instrumental and orchestral versions of the tracks, and a deluxe earbook included a vinyl LP.

The album received positive reviews. According to Don Lawson of The Guardian, Nightwish's use of a less-fanciful theme introduced elements which "result in their most ambitious and assured record yet" and he praised Holopainen's songwriting. Lawson wrote that Jansen "strikes a fine balance between operatic acrobatics and straightforward, soulful restraint, most notably on twinkling earworm 'Élan'." Metal Storm called Endless Forms Most Beautiful "a sweet album of awesome songs" which "doesn't try to be some over the top attempt to grandly announce a new era for the band" and "a smart move". The online magazine praised Jansen's vocals and how they challenged her voice compared to her previous work with ReVamp; she uses "the soft and sweet side, the lows, the hushed serenade, as well as an even harsher side".

Solomon Encina called the album the band's most accomplished effort in Metal Injection, although he found "Élan", "Alpenglow" and "Endless Forms Most Beautiful" repetitive and stale. Craig Hartranft, founder of Dangerdog Music Reviews, called Endless Forms Most Beautiful "pretty darn terrific". He described it as "the Nightwish you know and love: breathtaking arrangements paired with massive orchestration and beautiful vocals". MusicReviewRadar wrote: "[I]n Endless Forms Most Beautiful [Nightwish] evolved to their own personal and original style" leaving him "craving for their next album". According to the review team at Ultimate Guitar, the album needs several hearings to be fully understood but is "probably the most complete, well-written album in Nightwish's catalog". They considered "The Greatest Show on Earth" a pretentious title, but "closer to the truth than Nightwish has ever been before".

Five years after the album's release, two discoveries had been named in honor of the band, as well as the album. A new crab species, called the Tanidromites nightwishorum was discovered by curator of palaeontology, Dr Adiel A. Klompmaker on 10 July 2020, and was named in honor of the band in particular for the album. On 12 August 2020 a prehistoric rockshelter, called the Alpenglow Rockshelter, that was discovered in Pennsylvania, USA was also named for Nightwish, particularly in honor of the album's ninth track, "Alpenglow".

In 2021, it was elected by Metal Hammer as the 3rd best symphonic metal album of all time.

== Track listing ==
All lyrics are written by Tuomas Holopainen, except where noted; all music is composed by Holopainen, except where noted; all lead vocals by Floor Jansen, except where noted.

Endless Forms Most Beautiful track listing
No.	Title	Lyrics	Music	Length
1.	"Shudder Before the Beautiful"			6:29
2.	"Weak Fantasy"	Holopainen; Marko Hietala	Hietala; Holopainen	5:23
3.	"Élan"			4:45
4.	"Yours is an Empty Hope"	Holopainen; Hietala		5:34
5.	"Our Decades in the Sun"		Hietala; Holopainen	6:37
6.	"My Walden"		Holopainen; Hietala	4:38
7.	"Endless Forms Most Beautiful"			5:07
8.	"Edema Ruh"			5:15
9.	"Alpenglow"			4:45
10.	"The Eyes of Sharbat Gula"			6:03
11.	"The Greatest Show on Earth": I. "Four Point Six"; II. "Life"; III. "The Toolmaker"; IV. "The Understanding"; V. "Sea-Worn Driftwood"		Hietala (III); Holopainen	24:00
Total length:				78:36

=== Notes ===
- The digibook edition includes a second disc with an instrumental version of the album. In addition to this, the earbook edition includes a third disc featuring orchestral versions of all songs except for "My Walden" and "Edema Ruh".

== Personnel ==
All information except the lead vocal track specification from the album booklet.

Nightwish

- Floor Jansen – lead vocals
- Emppu Vuorinen – guitars
- Marko Hietala – bass, male vocals (2, 4, 11), acoustic guitar, backing vocals (1, 3, 5–9)
- Tuomas Holopainen – keyboards
- Troy Donockley – uilleann pipes, low whistles, bodhran, bouzouki, male vocals (tracks 6 and 8), backing vocals (tracks 3, 6, 8–10)
- All songs arranged by Troy Donockley, Kai Hahto, Marko Hietala, Tuomas Holopainen, Floor Jansen, Tero Kinnunen, Jukka Nevalainen and Emppu Vuorinen.

Additional personnel

- Kai Hahto – drums
- Richard Dawkins – spoken words on "Shudder Before the Beautiful" and "The Greatest Show on Earth"
- Pip Williams – orchestral and choir arrangements and directing
- Ilona Opulska – assistant to Williams
- James Shearman – conductor
- Metro Voices – choir
- Richard Ihnatowicz – music preparation

Metro Voices

- Jenny O'Grady – choirmaster
- Alexandra Gibson, Alice Fearn, Ann de Renais, Catherine Bott, Claire Henry, Deborah Miles Johnson, Eleanor Meynell, Emma Brain Gabbott, Grace Davidson, Helen Brooks, Jacqueline Barron, Jenny O’Grady, Joanna Forbes, Jo Marshall, Kate Bishop, Mary Carewe, Morag MacKay, Rosemary Forbes Butler, Sarah Eyden, Soophia Foroughi, Andrew Playfoot, Ben Fleetwood Smyth, Callum MacIntosh, David Porter Thomas, Gabriel Vick, Gerard O’Beirne, James Mawson, Lawrence Wallington, Lawrence White, Michael Dore, Neil Bellingham, Richard Henders, Robin Bailey, Stephen Weller, Steve Trowell, Tom Pearce

Children's Choir – Young Musicians London

- Lynda Richardson – choirmaster
- Omar Ait el Caid, Bertie Beaman, Delphine Christou Hill, Oliver Cripps, Eleanor Grant, Rowan Hallett, Theo Harper, Jane Jones, Asha Lincogle-Gabriel, Jenson Loake, Celine Markantonis, Kaela Simi Masek, Robert Masek, Marguerite Moriarty, Andrew Morton, Akinoluwa Olawore, Modadeogo Olawore, Christopher Sabiski, Alistair Spencer, George Webb

Production

- Tuomas Holopainen – production, mixing
- Tero (TeeCee) Kinnunen – co-production, engineering, mixing
- Nightwish – co-production
- Mikko Karmila – engineering, mixing
- Steve Price – orchestra engineering
- Jeremy Murphy – orchestra engineering assistant
- Jussi Tegelman – Soundscapes and music echoes in "The Toolmaker"
- Francesco Lupica's Cosmic Beam Experience ("Sea-Worn Driftwood")
- Mika Jussila – mastering
- Janne & Gina Pitkänen – cover art
- Ville Juurikkala – band photography

Orchestre de Grandeur

- Isobel Griffiths – orchestral contractor
- Lucy Whalley – assistant orchestral contractor
- Perry Montague-Mason – violins
- Emlyn Singleton – violins
- Dermot Crehan – violins
- Patrick Kiernan – violins
- Mark Berrow – violins
- Rita Manning – violins
- Boguslaw Kostecki – violins
- Everton Nelson – violins
- Chris Tombling – violins
- Steve Morris – violins
- Jackie Hartley – violins
- Emil Chakalov – violins
- Pete Hanson – violins
- Jim McLeod – violins
- Sonia Slany – violins
- Peter Lale – violas
- Bruce White – violas
- Martin Humbey – violas
- Rachel Bolt – violas
- Andy Parker – celli
- Martin Loveday – celli
- Dave Daniels – celli
- Jonathan Williams – celli
- Frank Schaefer – celli
- Paul Kegg – celli
- Chris Laurence – double basses
- Steve Mair – double basses
- Richard Pryce – double basses
- Andy Findon – flute, piccolo
- Anna Noakes – flute, piccolo
- David Theodore – oboe, cor anglais
- Nicholas Bucknall – b♭ clarinet
- Dave Fuest – b♭ clarinet, bass clarinet
- Julie Andrews – bassoon, contrabassoon
- Richard Watkins – French horns
- Philip Eastop – French horns
- Nigel Black – French horns
- Phil Cobb – trumpets
- Mike Lovatt – trumpets
- Kate Moore – trumpets
- Mark Nightingale – tenor trombones
- Ed Tarrant – tenor trombones
- Andy Wood – bass trombone
- Owen Slade – tuba
- Skaila Kanga – harp
- Paul Clarvis – ethnic percussion
- Stephen Henderson – timpani
- Frank Ricotti – orchestral percussion
- Gary Kettel – orchestral percussion

== Charts ==
=== Weekly charts ===
Weekly chart performance for Endless Forms Most Beautiful
Chart (2015)	Peak position
Australian Albums (ARIA)	16
Austrian Albums (Ö3 Austria)	4
Belgian Albums (Ultratop Flanders)	14
Belgian Albums (Ultratop Wallonia)	15
Canadian Albums (Billboard)	13
Czech Albums (ČNS IFPI)	1
Danish Albums (Hitlisten)	21
Dutch Albums (Album Top 100)	3
Finnish Albums (Suomen virallinen lista)	1
French Albums (SNEP)	12
German Albums (Offizielle Top 100)	2
Greek Albums (IFPI)	4
Hungarian Albums (MAHASZ)	2
Irish Albums (IRMA)	21
Irish Independent Albums (IRMA)	4
Italian Albums (FIMI)	18
Japanese Albums (Oricon)	31
New Zealand Albums (RMNZ)	32
Norwegian Albums (VG-lista)	3
Polish Albums (ZPAV)	10
Portuguese Albums (AFP)	21
Scottish Albums (Official Charts)	9
Spanish Albums (Promusicae)	13
Swedish Albums (Sverigetopplistan)	3
Swedish Hard Rock Albums (Sverigetopplistan)	1
Swiss Albums (Schweizer Hitparade)	2
UK Albums (Official Charts)	12
UK Independent Albums (Official Charts)	3
UK Rock & Metal Albums (Official Charts)	1
US Billboard 200	34
US Independent Albums (Billboard)	2
US Top Hard Rock Albums (Billboard)	4
US Top Rock Albums (Billboard)	8

=== Year-end charts ===
Year-end chart performance for Endless Forms Most Beautiful
Chart (2015)	Position
Belgian Albums (Ultratop Flanders)	109
Belgian Albums (Ultratop Wallonia)	174
Dutch Albums (Album Top 100)	85
Finnish Albums (Suomen virallinen lista)	2
French Albums (SNEP)	171
German Albums (Offizielle Top 100)	41
Swiss Albums (Schweizer Hitparade)	21
US Top Hard Rock Albums (Billboard)	43

== Certifications ==
Certifications for Endless Forms Most Beautiful
Region	Certification	Certified units/sales
Finland (Musiikkituottajat)	2× Platinum	43,742
Switzerland (IFPI Switzerland)	Gold	10,000^{^}
^{^} Shipments figures based on certification alone.
