= Harry Potter and the Goblet of Fire (soundtrack) =

Harry Potter and the Goblet of Fire (Original Motion Picture Soundtrack)

Film score by Patrick Doyle
- Released: 15 November 2005
- Recorded: 2005
- Studio: Air Lyndhurst Studios
- Genre: Soundtrack
- Length: 75:57

Patrick Doyle chronology
Nanny McPhee (2005)	Harry Potter and the Goblet of Fire (Original Motion Picture Soundtrack) (2005)	Jekyll & Hyde (2006)

Professional ratings
Review scores
Source	Rating
AllMusic	3.5/5 stars
Empire	4/5 stars
Filmtracks	4/5 stars
Movie Music UK	5/5 stars
Movie Wave	4/5 stars
SoundtrackNet	3.5/5 stars

Harry Potter and the Goblet of Fire (Original Motion Picture Soundtrack) was released on 15 November 2005. The film's score was composed by Patrick Doyle, conducted by James Shearman, recorded at Air Lyndhurst Studios and performed by the London Symphony Orchestra with orchestrations provided by Doyle, Shearman, Lawrence Ashmore, John Bell, Brad Dechter, Nicole Nevin and James McWilliam. The score included three main new themes: one representing the Triwizard Tournament, one representing Lord Voldemort, and one representing Harry Potter's crush on Cho Chang. Doyle incorporated an ominous reprisal of Hedwig's Theme into the score. A prominent minor theme is presented in "The Death of Cedric". The soundtrack entered the Billboard 200 at position eighty for the Week Ending 3 December, and also charted at four on the Top Soundtracks Chart.

Songs 22-24 are the songs performed during the Yule Ball scene by The Weird Sisters.

== Track listing ==
All tracks performed and composed by Patrick Doyle except where noted.

Harry Potter and the Goblet of Fire (Original Motion Picture Soundtrack) track listing
No.	Title	Writer(s)	Performer(s)	Length
1.	"The Story Continues (Contains Hedwig's Theme)"			1:31
2.	"Frank Dies"			2:12
3.	"The Quidditch World Cup"			1:52
4.	"The Dark Mark"			3:27
5.	"Foreign Visitors Arrive (Contains Hedwig's Theme)"			1:30
6.	"The Goblet of Fire"			3:23
7.	"Rita Skeeter"			1:42
8.	"Sirius Fire"			2:00
9.	"Harry Sees Dragons"			1:54
10.	"Golden Egg (Contains Hedwig Theme)"			6:10
11.	"Neville's Waltz"			2:11
12.	"Harry in Winter"			2:56
13.	"Potter Waltz"			2:19
14.	"Underwater Secrets"			2:28
15.	"The Black Lake"			4:38
16.	"Hogwarts' March"			2:47
17.	"The Maze"			4:44
18.	"Voldemort"			9:39
19.	"Death of Cedric"			1:59
20.	"Another Year Ends"			2:21
21.	"Hogwarts' Hymn"			2:59
22.	"Do the Hippogriff"	Jarvis Cocker; Jason Buckle	Cocker; Buckle; Jonny Greenwood; Phil Selway; Steve Claydon; Steve Mackey	3:39
23.	"This Is the Night"	Cocker	Cocker; Buckle; Greenwood; Selway; Claydon; Mackey	3:24
24.	"Magic Works"	Cocker	Cocker; Buckle; Greenwood; Selway; Claydon; Mackey	4:02
Total length:				75:57

== Charts ==
Weekly chart performance for Harry Potter And The Goblet Of Fire
Chart (2025)	Peak position
Hungarian Physical Albums (MAHASZ)	28
