= Gosford Park (soundtrack) =

Album by Patrick Doyle

Soundtrack album by Patrick Doyle and Ivor Novello
- Released: 15 January 2002
- Genre: Soundtrack
- Label: Decca Records

Gosford Park Original Motion Picture Soundtrack is the soundtrack to the 2001 film Gosford Park.

== Production ==
The director of Gosford Park, Robert Altman, discussed the direction the film's soundtrack would take with composer, Patrick Doyle, suggesting that the soundtrack should not attempt to direct the audience to any particular part of the film, but to support it nonetheless. Another potential issue in the soundtrack's composition was the integration of Ivor Novello songs with the overall score. Altman noted that both of these aspects were handled well by the composer. Doyle used the film's main character, Mary, as a focal point for his composition, taking influences from her Scottish nationality and incorporating them into the score. He described the collaboration with Altman as "one of the happiest of my career."

== Performers ==
=== Original score ===
Patrick Doyle's score was performed by ensembles of six to twelve members (the exact size depended on the piece) conducted by James Shearman. The arrangements utilised a six or seven piece string section, two woodwinds, piano, harp, classical guitar, and accordion, playing in various combinations. For swing and musette arrangements, a rhythm section of acoustic guitar, bass, and drums was added to the orchestra. On the swing pieces, guitarist John Parricelli played the Django Reinhardt-style acoustic lead guitar and Jamie Talbot played saxophone solos. The title piece is a piano solo performed by Brian Gascoigne.

Doyle's daughter Abigail sang two songs composed by Patrick Doyle, "Only for a While" and "The Way It's Meant to Be".

The original score's orchestrations were done by Doyle, Shearman, and Lawrence Ashmore.

=== Ivor Novello songs ===
Actor Jeremy Northam, who portrayed Welsh composer and musical theatre performer Ivor Novello in the film, recorded several Novello theatre songs for the soundtrack. In the film, Novello (as played by Northam) is featured singing four of these compositions while accompanying himself at the piano during a dinner party. For the soundtrack recording, Northam was accompanied on the four dinner party songs by classical pianist Christopher Northam, his older brother. In addition, Northam recorded Novello's song "The Land of Might-Have-Been" for the soundtrack in an orchestral arrangement that also featured Christopher Northam's piano.

In addition to the vocal performances, Christopher Northam recorded Novello's "Waltz of My Heart" as a piano solo for the soundtrack.

== Reception ==
The film review website SoundtrackNet reviewed the soundtrack positively. The critic, Glenn McClanan, praises Doyle's scoring as "effective and surprisingly well-developed." He goes on to say that the score was intended mainly for two purposes: to give the audience a sense of the film's setting and to impart to the audience a sense of emotion, and that the film is successful in both endeavours.

== Track listing ==
All music composed by Patrick Doyle, except as follows:

- 1, 6, 10, 11, 19, and 24 are songs with music composed by Ivor Novello and lyrics as noted in credits below.
- 16 and 20 are songs with music composed by Patrick Doyle and lyrics as noted in credits below.

Jeremy Northam's vocal performances are accompanied by Christopher Northam, piano.

No.	Composition	Artist
1	Waltz of My Heart (Ivor Novello / Christopher Hassall)	Christopher Northam, piano (instrumental)
2	Mr. Parks	orchestra
3	Gosford Park	orchestra
4	Bored to Sobs	orchestra
5	The Shirt	orchestra
6	And Her Mother Came Too (Ivor Novello / Dion Titheradge)	Jeremy Northam, vocal
7	Walking to Shoot	orchestra
8	No Smoke Without Fire	orchestra
9	Scherzo in G	orchestra
10	I Can Give You the Starlight (Ivor Novello / Christopher Hassall)	Jeremy Northam, vocal
11	What a Duke Should Be (Ivor Novello / Clifford Grey)	Jeremy Northam, vocal
12	Inspector Thompson	orchestra
13	Pull Yourself Together	orchestra
14	Life Goes On	orchestra
15	Secrets to Hide	orchestra
16	Only for a While (Patrick Doyle / Robert Altman)	Abigail Doyle, vocal with orchestra
17	Rather a Pasting	orchestra
18	Love Jam	orchestra
19	Why Isn't It You? (Ivor Novello / Christopher Hassall)	Jeremy Northam, vocal
20	The Way It's Meant to Be (Patrick Doyle / Abigail Doyle / Robert Altman)	Abigail Doyle, vocal with orchestra
21	Carpe Diem	orchestra
22	Good Luck	orchestra
23	Your Boy's Alive	orchestra
24	The Land of Might-Have-Been (Ivor Novello / Edward Moore)	Jeremy Northam, vocal, Christopher Northam, piano, with orchestra
