= James Shearman =

English conductor, orchestrator, and composer

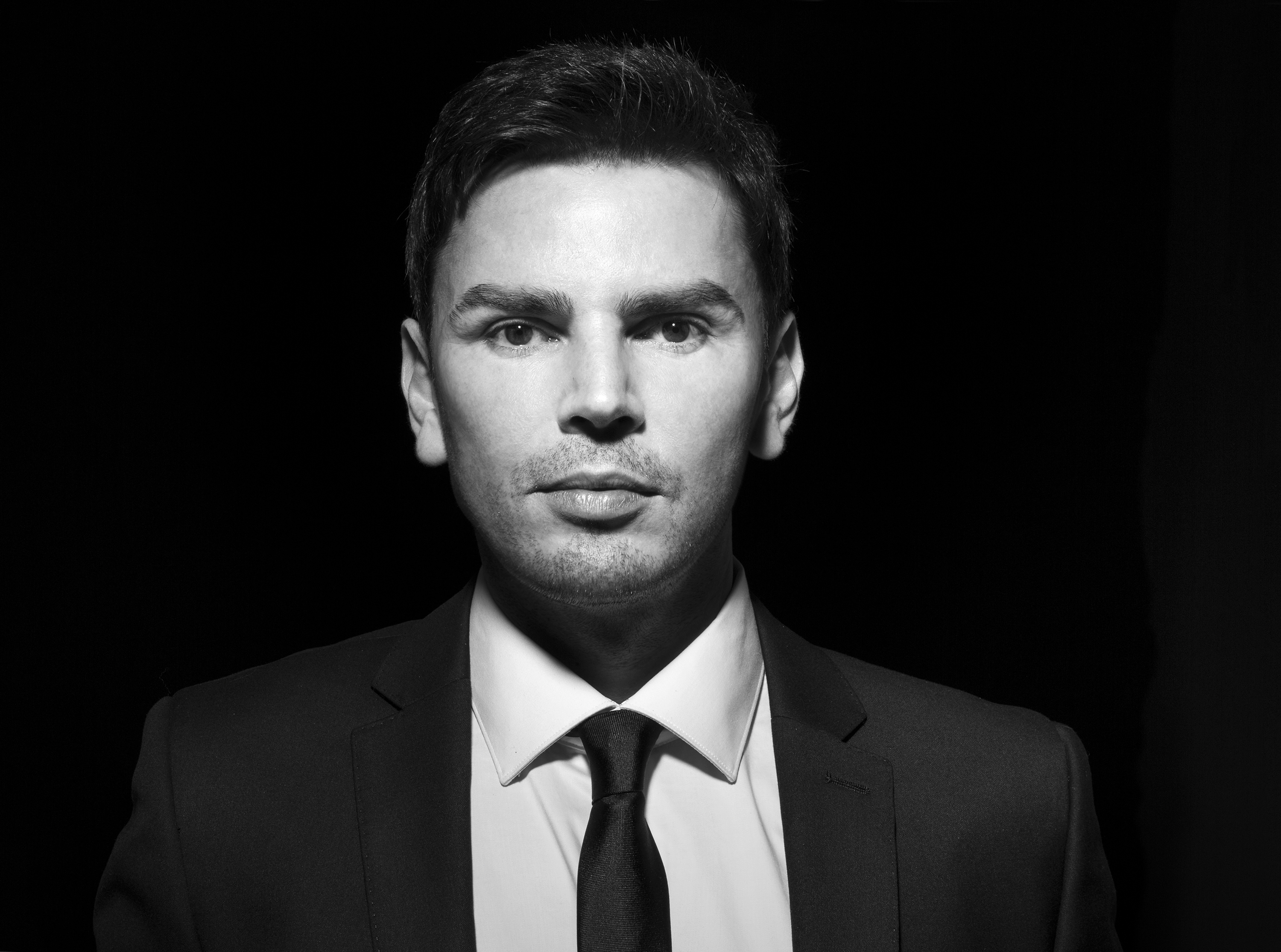
- Shearman in 2014

Background information
- Origin: England
- Occupations: Conductor; Orchestrator; Composer
- Years active: 1995–present
- Website: james-shearman.com

James Shearman is an English conductor, orchestrator, and composer. He is perhaps best known for his contributions to film scores including those for Gosford Park, Harry Potter and the Goblet of Fire, Manchester by the Sea and numerous others. He has collaborated frequently with composer, Patrick Doyle. In addition to his conducting and orchestration, Shearman is also a songwriter, having co-written the title track from Charlotte Church's 2000 album, Dream a Dream (among other songs). He regularly conducts orchestras, including the London Symphony Orchestra, Philharmonia Orchestra, Vienna Radio Symphony Orchestra, Royal Liverpool Philharmonic Orchestra, and the Qatar Philharmonic Orchestra.

== Early life and education ==
Shearman was born and grew up in England. He attended the Royal Academy of Music where he was one of four students in the four-year BMus Commercial Music degree program, studying composition and conducting. In his last year of study at the academy, Shearman was commissioned to compose an original piece to honor film composer, John Williams. The composition ("Metropolis — A Tribute to John Williams") was premiered in June 1996 during the British and American Film Music Festival at the Royal Academy of Music with Williams in attendance. Shearman was made a Fellow of the Royal Academy of Music in 2015.

== Career ==
Soon after his graduation from the Royal Academy of Music, Shearman began providing orchestrations to film scores. He first collaborated with composer Patrick Doyle on the 1998 film Great Expectations. This led to Shearman providing orchestrations and arrangements for Doyle on another 1998 film, Quest for Camelot. This partnership eventually resulted in Shearman becoming Doyle's principal orchestrator and conductor. He has gone on to provide conducting, orchestration, and/or arrangements for Doyle's scores for Thor, Rise of the Planet of the Apes, Brave, Harry Potter and the Goblet of Fire, Cinderella, and numerous others. In 2012, Shearman arranged the Brave orchestral suite for a Pixar in Concert event. In 2015, he conducted a series of concerts across Europe and the United States with Doyle entitled Shakespeare in Concert.

Over the course of his career, Shearman has also collaborated with numerous other composers including, Lesley Barber (Mansfield Park, Manchester by the Sea), Mark Isham (In The Valley of Elah, Reservation Road), Stephen Warbeck (Shakespeare in Love), Paul Cantelon (The Other Boleyn Girl), Jan A. P. Kaczmarek (Lost Souls), Alan Menken (Beauty and the Beast, Aladdin), and Hans Zimmer (Pearl Harbor).

He has also conducted a variety of orchestras both through his work with film scores and through live concerts. He made his concert conducting debut in 2004 with the City of Birmingham Symphony Orchestra, leading a concert of A.R. Rahman compositions. In March 2014, he conducted the Ulster Orchestra for the first time with The Music of Patrick Doyle from the Films of Sir Kenneth Branagh.

He made his Royal Festival Hall conducting debut with The Philharmonia Orchestra in October 2014. He has also conducted the London Symphony Orchestra, the Hollywood Studio Symphony, the Qatar Philharmonic Orchestra (at the 2017 Qatar British Festival), and numerous others. In 2017, Shearman made his Konzerthaus, Vienna and Vienna Radio Symphony Orchestra debut, sharing the conducting with American conductor John Mauceri for the televised 2017 Hollywood In Vienna concert: Fairytales and A Tribute to Danny Elfman. In April 2019, he made his Philharmonic Hall, Liverpool debut with the Royal Liverpool Philharmonic Orchestra and its Music from the Star Wars Saga concert.

In addition to his work with film scores and orchestral concerts, Shearman has also composed, conducted, and orchestrated songs for recording artists. He co-wrote (with Sam Babenia) the title track off of Charlotte Church's 2000 album, Dream a Dream. He has also worked with Conner Reeves, Oasis, Gary Barlow, and Nightwish. He conducted the choirs for the latter band's 2007 album, Dark Passion Play and the choirs and orchestra for the 2015 album, Endless Forms Most Beautiful. and was the arranger of the band's 2024 album Yesterwynde.

== Filmography ==
| Year | Title | Conductor | Orchestrator | Arranger | Composer | Notes |
|---|---|---|---|---|---|---|
| 1995 | Cracker | No | No | No | No | Music assistant Episode 3.5: "Best Boys (Part Two)" |
| 1995 | Othello | No | Yes | No | No | Additional orchestrator |
| 1998 | Great Expectations | No | Yes | No | No | Additional orchestrator |
| 1998 | Quest for Camelot | No | Yes | Yes | No | |
| 1998 | The Misadventures of Margaret | Yes | Yes | No | Yes | |
| 1998 | Shakespeare in Love | No | Yes | No | No | Additional orchestrator |
| 1999 | East/West | Yes | Yes | No | No | |
| 1999 | Mansfield Park | Yes | Yes | No | No | Additional orchestrator |
| 2000 | Love's Labour's Lost | Yes | Yes | Yes | No | |
| 2000 | Lost Souls | Yes | No | No | No | |
| 2001 | Bridget Jones's Diary | Yes | Yes | No | No | |
| 2001 | Pearl Harbor | Yes | No | No | No | |
| 2001 | Lara Croft: Tomb Raider | No | Yes | No | No | |
| 2001 | Gosford Park | Yes | Yes | No | No | |
| 2003 | Calendar Girls | Yes | Yes | No | No | |
| 2005 | Nanny McPhee | Yes | Yes | No | No | |
| 2005 | Harry Potter and the Goblet of Fire | Yes | Yes | No | No | |
| 2006 | The Black Dahlia | Yes | No | No | No | |
| 2006 | Eragon | Yes | Yes | No | No | |
| 2007 | In the Valley of Elah | Yes | No | No | No | |
| 2007 | Reservation Road | Yes | No | No | No | |
| 2008 | The Other Boleyn Girl | Yes | Yes | No | No | |
| 2008 | Nim's Island | Yes | Yes | No | No | |
| 2008 | W. | Yes | No | Yes | No | |
| 2011 | Thor | Yes | Yes | No | No | |
| 2011 | Rise of the Planet of the Apes | Yes | Yes | No | No | |
| 2011 | The Moth Diaries | Yes | Yes | No | No | |
| 2011 | Dolphin Tale | Yes | No | No | No | |
| 2012 | Brave | Yes | Yes | No | No | |
| 2013 | Flight of the Storks | Yes | No | No | No | Miniseries (2 episodes) |
| 2013–14 | Borgia | Yes | No | No | No | 17 episodes |
| 2014 | Jack Ryan: Shadow Recruit | Yes | Yes | No | No | |
| 2015 | Cinderella | Yes | No | No | No | |
| 2016 | Manchester by the Sea | No | Yes | No | No | |
| 2016 | Close to the Enemy | Yes | No | No | No | Miniseries (7 episodes) |
| 2017 | Beauty and the Beast | No | Yes | No | No | |
| 2017 | Murder on the Orient Express | Yes | No | No | No | |
| 2017 | The Emoji Movie | Yes | Yes | No | No | |
| 2018 | Irreplaceable You | No | Yes | No | No | |
| 2019 | Aladdin | No | Yes | No | No | |
| 2023 | Miraculous: Ladybug & Cat Noir, The Movie | Yes | No | No | No | |
| 2026 | Supergirl | Yes | Yes | Yes | No | |

== Discography ==
List of credits on selected albums
| Album | Year | Artist | Role | Notes |
|---|---|---|---|---|
| Earthbound | 1997 | Conner Reeves | Orchestra conductor | |
| Twelve Months, Eleven Days | 1999 | Gary Barlow | String arrangements | UK #35 |
| Dream a Dream | 2000 | Charlotte Church | Composer, arranger | Co-wrote "Dream a Dream" |
| The Opera Band | 2004 | Amici Forever | Producer, orchestrator, composer | |
| Once | 2004 | Nightwish | Conductor | FIN #1 |
| Dark Passion Play | 2007 | Nightwish | Conductor | US #84 |
| Imaginaerum | 2011 | Nightwish | Conductor | US #27 |
| Endless Forms Most Beautiful | 2015 | Nightwish | Conductor | US #34 |
| Human. :II: Nature. | 2020 | Nightwish | Conductor | US #110 |
| Yesterwynde | 2024 | Nightwish | Conductor | |
