= Metro Voices =

UK choir

Metro Voices is a choir group based in London, England, that specialises in performing for the motion pictures. They work closely with the London Philharmonic Orchestra and with acclaimed British composer Craig Armstrong. They are known from their light and melodic singing (heard in the soundtrack from Love Actually) to their flamboyant and bombastic chorus (heard in the soundtrack from Romeo + Juliet and Pirates of the Caribbean: Dead Man's Chest).

Metro Voices was formed in 1996, by singer and vocal coach Jenny O'Grady.

== Partial filmography ==
- Ronin (1998)
- The Talented Mr. Ripley (1999)
- Message in a Bottle (1999)
- Sunshine (1999)
- Messenger: The Story of Joan of Arc (1999)
- Sleepy Hollow (1999)
- The Beach (2000)
- Miracle Maker (2000)
- Shiner (2000)
- Unbreakable (2000)
- Chocolat (2000)
- Gabriel & Me (2001)
- Shrek (2001)
- Lara Croft: Tomb Raider (2001)
- Atlantis: The Lost Empire (2001)
- Kiss of the Dragon (2001)
- Spy Game (2001)
- The Quiet American (2002)
- Xenosaga Episode I: Der Wille zur Macht (2002) (Video game)
- Love Actually (2003)
- The Lion King 1½ (2004)
- Teacher's Pet (2004)
- Shrek 2 (2004)
- Ray (2004)
- Sahara (2005)
- The Island (2005)
- Kinky Boots (2005)
- The Omen (2006)
- Pirates of the Caribbean: Dead Man's Chest (2006)
- The Nativity Story (2006)
- Blood Diamond (2006)
- 300 (2006)
- The Water Horse (2007)
- Pirates of the Caribbean: At World's End (2007)
- Elizabeth: The Golden Age (2007)
- Bee Movie (2007)
- Quest for a Heart (2007)
- The Water Horse (2007)
- Arn: The Knight Templar (2007)
- Good (2008)
- Milk (2008)
- The Mummy: Tomb of the Dragon Emperor (2008)
- Babylon A.D. (2008)
- Monsters vs Aliens (2009)
- 9 (2009)
- Astro Boy (2009)
- Robin Hood (2010)
- Tinkerbell and the Great Fairy Rescue (2010)
- Kick-Ass (2010)
- How to Train Your Dragon (2010)
- Megamind (2010)
- Transformers: Dark of the Moon (2011)
- Kung Fu Panda 2 (2011)
- Puss in Boots (2011)
- Prometheus (2012)
- Frankenweenie (2012)
- Promised Land (2012)
- Madagascar 3: Europe's Most Wanted (2012)
- Imaginaerum (2012)
- Stoker (2013)
- World War Z (2013)
- Turbo (2013)
- Transcendence (2014)
- Guardians of the Galaxy (2014)
- Bloodborne (2015) (Video game)
- Poltergeist (2015)
- Everybody's Gone to the Rapture (2015) (Video game)
- Avengers: Age of Ultron (2015)
- Pan (2015)
- The Order: 1886 (2015)(Video game)
- Kung Fu Panda 3 (2016)
- Kubo and the Two Strings (2016)
- Guardians of the Galaxy Vol. 2 (2017)
- Dumbo (2019)
- The SpongeBob Movie: Sponge on the Run (2020)
