= Acoustic Adventures – Volume One =

Compilation album by Sonata Arctica
- Released: 21 January 2022
- Studio: Note On Studio
- Genre: Acoustic rock, Hard rock, Power metal
- Label: Atomic Fire
- Producer: Mikko Tegelman and Sonata Arctica

Sonata Arctica chronology
Acoustic Adventures – Volume One (2022)	Acoustic Adventures – Volume Two (2022)

Singles from Acoustic Adventures – Volume One
- 1. "The Rest of the Sun Belongs to Me" Released: 3 December 2021

Acoustic Adventures – Volume One is an acoustic album by the Finnish metal band Sonata Arctica. It is the first part of a duo of acoustic albums released by the band in that year.

== Track listing ==
All songs written by Tony Kakko. All songs arranged by Sonata Arctica, except "The Rest Of The Sun Belongs To Me" arranged by Masi Hukari and Sonata Arctica.

No.	Title	Original album	Length
1.	"The Rest of the Sun Belongs to Me"	Winterheart's Guild (2003) (Japanese bonus track)	5:52
2.	"For the Sake of Revenge"	Unia (2007)	3:32
3.	"A Little Less Understanding"	Talviyö (2019)	4:30
4.	"Alone in Heaven"	Stones Grow Her Name (2013)	5:18
5.	"Tallulah"	Silence (2001)	5:29
6.	"Don't Say a Word"	Reckoning Night (2004)	6:15
7.	"As If the World Wasn't Ending"	The Days of Grays (2009)	3:51
8.	"Paid in Full"	Unia (2007)	4:00
9.	"Tonight I Dance Alone"	Stones Grow Her Name (2012) (European & North American bonus track)	3:17
10.	"The Wolves Die Young"	Pariah's Child (2014)	3:59
11.	"Wolf & Raven"	Silence (2001)	4:25
12.	"On the Faultline"	The Ninth Hour (2016)	5:21
Total length:			55:49

== Personnel ==
=== Sonata Arctica ===
- Tony Kakko - Lead and backing vocals
- Elias Viljanen - Guitars, banjo and backing vocals
- Henrik Klingenberg - Keyboards and backing vocals
- Pasi Kauppinen - Bass and backing vocals
- Tommy Portimo - Drums and percussion

=== Additional personnel ===
- Matti Tegelman - contrabass in "For The Sake Of Revenge" and "Don't Say A Word"
- Produced by Mikko Tegelman and Sonata Arctica
- Recorded at Studio57 by Pasi Kauppinen and Mikko Tegelman
- Mastered by Janne Tolsa at Note On Studio
- Cover layout by Janne Pitkänen
