= Acoustic Adventures – Volume Two =

Compilation album by Sonata Arctica
- Released: 30 September 2022
- Studio: Note On Studio
- Genre: Acoustic rock, Hard rock, Power metal
- Label: Atomic Fire
- Producer: Mikko Tegelman and Sonata Arctica

Sonata Arctica chronology
Acoustic Adventures – Volume One (2022)	Acoustic Adventures – Volume Two (2022)

Acoustic Adventures – Volume Two is an acoustic album by the Finnish metal band Sonata Arctica. It is the second part of a duo of acoustic albums released by the band in that year.

== Track listing ==
All songs written by Tony Kakko. All songs arranged by Sonata Arctica.

No.	Title	Original album	Length
1.	"I Have a Right"	Stones Grow Her Name (2012)	4:40
2.	"Black Sheep"	Silence (2001)	4:01
3.	"Half a Marathon Man"	Pariah's Child (2014)	5:00
4.	"Broken"	Winterheart's Guild (2003)	5:13
5.	"Letter to Dana"	Ecliptica (1999)	6:18
6.	"FullMoon"	Ecliptica (1999)	4:53
7.	"Shamandalie"	Reckoning Night (2004)	3:57
8.	"San Sebastian"	Silence (2001)	3:39
9.	"Gravenimage"	Winterheart's Guild (2003)	5:11
10.	"Flag in the Ground"	The Days of Grays (2009)	3:54
11.	"My Land"	Ecliptica (1999)	4:56
12.	"Victoria's Secret"	Winterheart's Guild (2003)	3:02
Total length:			54:44

== Personnel ==
=== Sonata Arctica ===
- Tony Kakko - Lead and backing vocals
- Elias Viljanen - Guitars, banjo and backing vocals
- Henrik Klingenberg - Keyboards and backing vocals
- Pasi Kauppinen - Bass and backing vocals
- Tommy Portimo - Drums and percussion

=== Additional personnel ===
- Matti Tegelman - contrabass in "Gravenimage"
- Produced by Mikko Tegelman and Sonata Arctica
- Recorded at Studio57 by Pasi Kauppinen and Mikko Tegelman
- Mastered by Janne Tolsa at Note On Studio
- Cover layout by Janne Pitkänen
