= Pariah's Child =

2014 studio album by Sonata Arctica

Studio album by Sonata Arctica
- Released: 28 March 2014 (Europe); 31 March 2014 (United Kingdom); 1 April 2014 (North America)
- Recorded: 2013–2014 at Studio57, Kakkoslaatu Studio, The Lanceland Room, Magic 7-Studio and Secret Location Studio
- Genre: Power metal, symphonic metal, progressive metal
- Length: 53:04
- Label: Nuclear Blast
- Producer: Pasi Kauppinen

Sonata Arctica chronology
Stones Grow Her Name (2012)	Pariah's Child (2014)	The Ninth Hour (2016)

Singles from Pariah's Child
- 1. "The Wolves Die Young" Released: 11 February 2014; 2. "Cloud Factory" Released: 28 February 2014; 3. "Love" Released: 4 April 2014

Professional ratings
Review scores
Source	Rating
Angry Metal Guy	3.0/5
Metal.de	7/10
MetalCrypt	3.5/5
Metal Hammer	6/7
Metal Rules	4/5
Metal Storm	7.5/10 stars

Pariah's Child is the eighth studio album by Finnish power metal band Sonata Arctica. It was released on 28 March 2014 by Nuclear Blast. It is the first Sonata Arctica release with new bassist Pasi Kauppinen, who replaced Marko Paasikoski.

== Background and recording ==
In a June 2013 interview concerning keyboardist Henrik Klingenberg's own band Silent Voices, he confirmed Sonata Arctica would go into recording for their eighth studio album in September 2013. Concerning the progress and style of this new album, he also mentioned "The bulk of the album, we already have the demos..." as well as "we want to focus on making songs that work live."

During rehearsals, Henrik mentioned on his blog that songs they were rehearsing for the new album seemed to hearken towards Sonata Arctica's earlier days, and that they would try to record a 10-minute track. He also commented that, differently from their previous album, they recorded everything at the same place, as a band.

On 9 January 2014 the band announced via their official website that the album would be titled Pariah's Child and would be released on 28 March 2014.

On 12 February the band released the video for "The Wolves Die Young" via Radio Rock.

== Songs and themes ==
Kakko has described Pariah's Child as "the album that should have been done after Reckoning Night besides Unia." He also commented:

I think it sort of started with the fact that our first album was released 15 years ago and now we are going to have an anniversary tour. We are going to rehearse our old songs for the tour so that perhaps motivated us to do faster songs now. We also started to think that what we really are and what we would like to be. What is Sonata Arctica? The first thing people think about our band is probably power metal. Our band has lived and survived its puberty and obstinate age and now we can gradually revert to type.

The album also marks the return of wolf-themed songs, which were absent in their previous album, Stones Grow Her Name. According to Kakko, "wolf is just once again a metaphor, for instance, for fear and processing it in your life. Fear make people do things. Or actually denying the fact that you fear something."

He also commented on the album artwork upon the release announcement:

As the music on the album is bowing more towards the "old" Sonata, meaning more power metal style elements and wolves in many of the songs in one form or another, it was clear we need a wolf on the cover. An abandoned wolf. A pariah. Or Pariah's child, actually. The new generation to bring the old logo back.

The art was once again made by Janne Pitkänen, also known as Toxic Angel.

The opening track and first single, "The Wolves Die Young", was described by Henrik as a typical Sonata Arctica song. It was one of the first songs to be written for the album. The song received a video shot both in Sweden and Finland. The band was filmed performing in Lahti on the course of 2 or 3 hours while producer Patric Ullaeus handled the rest of it in Sweden.

"Running Lights" was originally planned as a Japanese bonus track, but the band was so pleased with its final form that they decided to make it a regular track. Tommy Portimo described his drum work at the track as a tribute to Jörg Michael. Tony said he wrote the lyrics on a train ride to the studio the day after Lou Reed died, and the track was in a way a tribute to him.

Henrik considers "Take One Breath" as the most progressive song of the album, with a piano work that demanded bigger efforts from him. Guitarist Elias Viljanen says the song moves towards the "newer" Sonata Arctica. Tony described it as one of the heaviest songs. The lyrics cover the topics of transhumanism and French Humanism. Kakko originally wrote it for a possible solo release.

The second single, "Cloud Factory", was written much before the other songs, when the band was still rehearsing for Stones Grow Her Name. Henrik described its melody as "annoying" and thus it would be a good choice for a second single, so that other people are "annoyed" too. Kakko explained the lyrics in an interview:

I knew the song was going to be about children getting stuck in that same town and factory where their fathers and grand-fathers got stuck too because it's a safe and, in a way, a happy place to be. The factory offers them livelihood and some form of happiness but they are stuck there nonetheless and they are slaves to their town. They never get to see the world and search for their true happiness from anywhere else but that tiny village or that one factory everybody goes to and their children will also go to.

"Blood" is another of the heaviest songs. The keyboard intro was made by Tony and it was one of the latest songs to be rehearsed. Pasi and Elias have both described it as one of their favorite songs of the album, and the lyrics are about fear.

Henrik described the lyrics of "What Did You Do in the War, Dad?" as the saddest he ever heard by Tony. After Tony finished writing the song, he texted Tommy saying he had written the best song of the album. Tony also stated that the song made him cry sometimes and that the song is "something new for Sonata Arctica, lyrically at least."

"Half a Marathon Man" is "definitely not a serious song", according to Henrik. It is a "simple, easy and fun" rock song, and one of the last to be rehearsed for the album. It was played just twice by the band before recording, just 24 hours after it was written, the fastest pace ever by the band. Kakko wrote it on the course of two or three hours in a morning and showed it to his band mates later that night during a sauna party in his house. The sounds of steps heard on the song are actually Kakko himself jogging.

"X Marks the Spot" is a comic song. Henrik consider it to be close to Stone Grows Her Name's "Cinderblox" in feeling and attitude. He also said the song has some guest vocals, but he didn't specify by whom. Kakko considers it to be the hardest song to write for the album, and also said it took him quite some time until he got it right the way he was pleased. Regarding its lyrics, he explained:

It's about what you want to fill the blank with. I decided to throw rocks at those people who blindly give their lives away to religion or other weird organizations like cults. They really give away their freedom of thoughts and go the wrong direction. I had one friend in time who was that way. It pissed me off, it's a waste of good human. It's unfortunate.

The third single and second video "Love" is a short ballad. Tommy used two different drum kits in this song, whereas Pasi played the fretless bass guitar. The song reminded Elias of Silence's "Tallulah". Regarding the lyrics, Tony said that people always say he doesn't write happy love songs, so he decided to write this story about two partners who meet at a young age and stay together for all their lives. The song was one of 60 works that Kakko composed through the years and kept as a "reserve" for future albums.

=== "Larger Than Life" ===
Ending the album and clocking at just nearly ten minutes, "Larger Than Life" is the third longest song ever by the band (second longest being The Ninth Hour's "White Pearl, Black Oceans – Part II, By the Grace of the Ocean", longest being Silence's "The Power of One"). The song features some orchestrations, including a harp. Henrik consider it the next great, big thing by the band since Reckoning Night's "White Pearl, Black Oceans [Part I]" Tommy said he considers it at the moment of the interview his "all time favorite song". According to Elias, the song has sad and happy moments, like life itself. Kakko created the song after fooling around with some orchestra sounds, by joining different pieces of music together.

The lyrics tell the story of an actor at young age that gets a role that makes him very famous, and life eventually provides him with everything an artist could wish. However, he didn't make a life for himself, and he decides to give that role to someone else and start a new life. In another interview, Kakko, gave a different version of his end, stating the character was frustrated for having nobody to share his achievements with and he ultimately decides to search for someone, who he eventually finds.

== Track listing ==
All tracks are written by Tony Kakko.

No.	Title	Length
1.	"The Wolves Die Young"	4:13
2.	"Running Lights"	4:26
3.	"Take One Breath"	4:19
4.	"Cloud Factory"	4:17
5.	"Blood"	5:54
6.	"What Did You Do in the War, Dad?"	5:13
7.	"Half a Marathon Man"	5:43
8.	"X Marks the Spot"	5:20
9.	"Love"	3:50
10.	"Larger Than Life"	9:57
Total length:		53:06

Korea & Japanese Bonus Track
No.	Title	Length
11.	"No Pain"	5:26
Total length:		58:32

== Personnel ==
- Tony Kakko – vocals, additional keyboards, programming, arrangements, additional acoustic guitar, choirs and backing vocals
- Elias Viljanen – guitars
- Pasi Kauppinen – bass
- Henrik Klingenberg – keyboards, Hammond
- Tommy Portimo – drums

Guest musicians

- Laura Hynninem – Harp on "Take One Breath", "Larger Than Life" and "No Pain"
- Jaakko Koskinen – The Preacher on "X Marks the Spot"
- International Lowerflabbi Congregation Choir – "X Marks the Spot"
- Masi Hukari – Spoken description of blood on "Blood"; flute on "Half a Marathon Man", proofreading, lead vocal recording, coaching
- Funky Buttapplause Group – Clapping on Cloud Factory
- Mikko P. Mustonen – Orchestrations in "Larger Than Life"
- M&N – additional backing vocals on "Take One Breath", "What Did You Do in the War, Dad?"
- Leena – Wolf howl on "Blood"

== Charts ==
Chart (2014)	Peak position
Austrian Albums (Ö3 Austria)	30
Belgian Albums (Ultratop Flanders)	101
Belgian Albums (Ultratop Wallonia)	87
Dutch Albums (Album Top 100)	52
Finnish Albums (Suomen virallinen lista)	1
French Albums (SNEP)	74
German Albums (Offizielle Top 100)	31
Japanese Albums (Oricon)	70
Spanish Albums (PROMUSICAE)	78
Swedish Albums (Sverigetopplistan)	50
Swiss Albums (Schweizer Hitparade)	13
