= Live in Finland =

2011 live album by Sonata Arctica

Live album by Sonata Arctica
- Released: 11 November 2011
- Recorded: 15 April 2011 in Oulu, Finland
- Genre: Power metal
- Length: CD 1: 71:11; CD 2: 42:32; DVD: 164:48
- Label: Nuclear Blast

Sonata Arctica chronology
The Days of Grays (2009)	Live in Finland (2011)	Stones Grow Her Name (2012)

Live in Finland is a live album and DVD recorded by the Finnish power metal band Sonata Arctica. Live in Finland was recorded at Club Teatria in Oulu, Finland on 15 April 2011 during "The Days Of Grays" World Tour, and was released on 11 November 2011. Along with the CD, there is a DVD in stereo and Surround 5.1 sound, which also includes Finnish commentary track by the band, making-of videos, two documentaries, photos, and music videos. The DVD's cover was created by Xabier Loebl.

== Track list: CD 1 - "Live in Finland" ==
No.	Title	Length
1.	"Intro (Everything Fades to Gray)"	2:18
2.	"Flag in the Ground"	4:27
3.	"Last Amazing Grays"	5:44
4.	"Juliet"	5:51
5.	"Replica"	4:42
6.	"Blank File"	4:09
7.	"As If the World Wasn't Ending"	3:53
8.	"Paid in Full"	4:21
9.	"Instrumental Exhibition"	3:36
10.	"The Misery"	5:16
11.	"In Black & White"	5:14
12.	"Letter to Dana"	5:12
13.	"Caleb"	6:23
14.	"Don't Say a Word / Outro"	10:05
Total length:		71:11

== Track list: CD 2 - "Sonata Arctica Open Air II" ==
No.	Title	Length
1.	"Paid in Full"	4:24
2.	"8th Commandment"	3:59
3.	"Replica"	4:45
4.	"Tallulah"	5:37
5.	"Caleb"	6:14
6.	"White Pearl, Black Oceans"	8:06
7.	"Draw Me"	3:57
8.	"FullMoon"	5:30
Total length:		42:32

== Track list: DVD 1 ==
No.	Title	Length
1.	"Intro"	2:33
2.	"Flag in the Ground"	4:20
3.	"Last Amazing Grays"	5:46
4.	"Juliet"	5:59
5.	"Replica"	4:42
6.	"Blank File"	4:09
7.	"As If the World Wasn't Ending"	3:54
8.	"Paid in Full"	4:21
9.	"Victoria's Secret"	4:48
10.	"Instrumental Exhibition"	3:16
11.	"The Misery"	5:23
12.	"FullMoon"	5:47
13.	"In Black & White"	5:50
14.	"Mary-Lou"	5:47
15.	"Shy"	4:33
16.	"Letter to Dana"	5:25
17.	"Caleb"	6:30
18.	"Don't Say a Word"	6:15
19.	"Outro"	7:05
Total length:		96:48

== Track list: DVD 2 ==
No.	Title	Length
1.	"Sonata Arctica Open Air II: 1. White Pearl, Black Oceans; 2. Draw Me; 3. In Black & White; 4. Don't Say a Word"	26:20
2.	"Acoustic Live at Alcaraz, Milano: 1. Mary-Lou; 2. Shy; 3. Letter to Dana"	17:07
3.	"Bonus: Making Of's: Live in Finland, Flag in the Ground; Tour Document: Latin-American Tour Documentary, Made in Finland Tour Documentary; Music Videos (Don't Say a Word, Paid in Full, Flag in the Ground) & More..."	116:22
Total length:		159:49

== Personnel ==
- Tony Kakko - vocals, acoustic guitar
- Elias Viljanen - electric and acoustic guitars & backing vocals
- Henrik Klingenberg - keyboards, keytar, acoustic bass & backing vocals
- Marko Paasikoski - bass, acoustic guitar & backing vocals
- Tommy Portimo - drums, cajón

== Charts ==
Chart (2011)	Peak position
Finnish Albums (Suomen virallinen lista)	20
German Albums (Offizielle Top 100)	92
Spanish Albums (Promusicae)	75

== Info ==
- Mixed by Pasi Kauppinen at Studio57
- Mastered by Svante Forsbäck at Chartmakers

== Credits ==
- All songs written by Tony Kakko, except "Instrumental Exhibition" which was written by Henrik Klingenberg and Elias Viljanen
- Arrangements by Sonata Arctica
