= Successor (EP) =

2000 EP by Sonata Arctica

EP by Sonata Arctica
- Released: 7 August 2000
- Recorded: 2000 at Tico Tico studios
- Genre: Power metal
- Length: 30:39
- Label: Spinefarm
- Producer: Sonata Arctica; Ahti Kortelainen

Sonata Arctica chronology
Ecliptica (1999)	Successor (2000)	Silence (2001)

Successor is an EP by Sonata Arctica, released through Spinefarm Records on 7 August 2000.

== Recording ==
Successor comprises some live versions of Sonata Arctica's songs, an edited version of the song "FullMoon" from the full length album Ecliptica, two new songs and two cover songs from German bands.

The cover songs, which also appear in the Takatalvi EP, are:

- "Still Loving You", originally recorded by the Scorpions in their LP Love at First Sting (1984).
- "I Want Out", originally recorded by the power metal band Helloween in the 1988 album Keeper of the Seven Keys: Part II.

The two songs composed for the album are the acoustic ballad "Shy" (originally an upbeat hard rock demo song from when the band were still called Tricky Means) and "San Sebastian", that was re-released on the 2001 album Silence (this song was to be released in Ecliptica, but the band chose to release it on this EP).

Live tracks were performed on 16 June 2000 at Provinssirock festival, Seinäjoki, Finland.

== Critical reception ==
Powermetal.de called the cover songs the definitive highlight of the EP. The two new songs were noted as terrible and the rest of the EP was called unspectacular. Vampster noted the Scorpions cover as extraordinary but Helloween cover was said to lack the energy of the original. "San Sebastian" was called average, while "Shy" was called a great ballad. The two live tracks were noted as great, especially "My Land".

== Track listing ==
All tracks are written by Tony Kakko.

No.	Title	Length
1.	"FullMoon (edit)"	4:00
2.	"Still Loving You" (Scorpions cover)	4:33
3.	"I Want Out" (Helloween cover)	3:52
4.	"San Sebastian"	4:46
5.	"Shy"	4:18
6.	"Replica (live)"	4:48
7.	"My Land (live)"	4:22
8.	"UnOpened (live)" (Japanese and South American versions only)	4:04
9.	"FullMoon (live)" (Japanese and South American versions only)	4:54
10.	"8th Commandment (live)" (French and South American versions only)	3:54
11.	"Letter to Dana (live)" (French and South American versions only)	5:32
12.	"Kingdom for a Heart (live)" (South American version only)	3:40

== Personnel ==
- Tony Kakko – vocals, additional keyboards
- Jani Liimatainen – guitars
- Janne Kivilahti – bass guitar
- Mikko Härkin – keyboards
- Tommy Portimo – drums
