= Songs of Silence (Sonata Arctica album) =

2002 live album by Sonata Arctica

Songs of Silence – Live in Tokyo

Live album by Sonata Arctica
- Released: 1 July 2002
- Recorded: 4 September 2001 at Shibuya On Air East, Tokyo, Japan
- Genre: Power metal
- Length: 60:07
- Label: Spinefarm

Sonata Arctica chronology
Silence (2001)	Songs of Silence – Live in Tokyo (2002)	Winterheart's Guild (2003)

Alternative cover
- Cartoon cover art for Asian releases

Songs of Silence – Live in Tokyo is a live album by Finnish power metal band Sonata Arctica. Both Japanese and Korean versions have an exclusive cover art and one bonus track, and their first edition had a bonus CD containing three tracks.

== Track listing ==
All tracks are written by Tony Kakko.

No.	Title	Length
1.	"Intro"	1:11
2.	"Weballergy"	4:25
3.	"Kingdom for a Heart"	4:10
4.	"Sing in Silence"	3:49
5.	"False News Travel Fast"	5:20
6.	"Last Drop Falls"	5:15
7.	"Respect the Wilderness"	4:03
8.	"FullMoon"	5:24
9.	"The End of This Chapter"	5:58
10.	"The Power of One" (Asian bonus track)"	9:35
11.	"Replica"	5:13
12.	"My Land"	5:02
13.	"Black Sheep"	4:08
14.	"Wolf & Raven"	6:09
Total length:		60:07

Bonus CD (Asian 1st edition only)
No.	Title	Length
1.	"Blank File"	4:33
2.	"Land of the Free"	4:52
3.	"PeaceMaker (studio version)"	3:27
Total length:		72:19

== Personnel ==
- Tony Kakko – vocals
- Jani Liimatainen – guitar
- Marko Paasikoski – bass guitar
- Mikko Härkin – keyboards
- Tommy Portimo – drums

== Charts ==
Chart (2002)	Peak position
Finnish Albums (Suomen virallinen lista)	22

== Info ==
- Mixed by Mikko Karmila at Finnvox Studios
- Mastered by Mika Jussila Finnvox Studios
- Cover art by Janne "ToxicAngel" Pitkänen
- Photos in cover taken by Timo Isoaho and Mape Ollila

== Notes ==
- At the end of "False News Travel Fast", Jani Liimatainen plays a riff that is closely similar to the main riff of the song "Speed of Light" by Stratovarius (a similar riff is also used in "Future Shock"). Jani Liimatainen also plays that riff before the first chorus of "Blank File" in the same concert.
