= Talviyö =

2019 studio album by Sonata Arctica

Studio album by Sonata Arctica
- Released: 6 September 2019
- Recorded: September 2018–May 2019
- Studio: Studio57
- Genre: Power metal
- Length: 56:28
- Label: Nuclear Blast
- Producer: Mikko Tegelman, Sonata Arctica

Sonata Arctica chronology
| The Ninth Hour (2016) | Talviyö (2019) | Clear Cold Beyond (2024) |

Singles from Talviyö
- 1. "A Little Less Understanding" Released: 21 June 2019; 2. "Cold" Released: 23 August 2019; 3. "Who Failed the Most" Released: 6 September 2019

Professional ratings
Review scores
| Source | Rating |
|---|---|
| Angry Metal Guy | 1.5/5 |
| Blabbermouth.net | 8/10 |
| Brave Words | 6/10 |
| Distorted Sound | 6/10 |
| Metal.de | 6/10 |
| Metal Crypt | 3.75/5 |
| Metal Injection | 6.5/10 |
| Sonic Perspectives | favorable |

Talviyö (Finnish for "winter night") is the tenth studio album by Finnish power metal band Sonata Arctica. It was released on 6 September 2019 by Nuclear Blast.

== Background and recording ==
The album was produced by the band and Mikko Tegelman, a producer they already wanted for their previous album, The Ninth Hour, but was unavailable due to scheduling conflicts.

According to vocalist, additional keyboardist and main songwriter Tony Kakko, the band had been willing to create an album with a more "live" sound, but could never properly do it on their own. In order to make sure Tegelman would be able to work with them, Kakko had all songs ready before they went into studio. In the album's promotional material, Kakko said "the idea was to create an album that is musically in line with at least the previous two albums".

In June and July 2018, he showed some demos of songs he had written earlier that year to the rest of the band and by the time they entered the studio, they already knew what to do. Under Tegelman's guidance, Tommy Portimo (drummer) and Pasi Kauppinnen (bassist) played their instruments together, which, according to Kakko, "give the whole rhythm section a whole organic feel and that gave it a much stronger foundation for the album and made it much easier to develop the album". He ultimately called it "a really pleasant album to make songwriting-wise".

The recordings started in September 2018 and the album was mixed and mastered in May 2019.

=== Title ===
The title of the album is a Finnish word for "winter night". According to Kakko, he was looking for a simple name and started searching for translations of "night" in other languages via Google Translate. Eventually, he came back to his own mother tongue and suggested the title "Talvi". The other members considered it "boring" and he jokingly suggested "Talviyö", an expression that he felt most people outside of Finland would struggle to pronounce. The other members laughed and they realized "that's what it should be called".

=== Cover ===
The cover photograph is by Onni Wiljami. The original picture was edited by Wiljami) so as to depict a nighttime situation, among other changes.

== Song information ==
Kakko explained that the album is not a concept one, but admitted that the songs are somehow connected, thematically speaking. He considers it a natural continuation of the albums the band has been releasing since Stones Grow Her Name. He also sees it the third album of the band's third age.

Kakko admitted that the opening track "Message From the Sun" could be "misleading" because "it's more of the power metal side of Sonata Arctica for all our power metal fans." The song talks about the mythology behind the northern lights.

"Whirlwind" includes sounds and words by Kakko's son; those were originally recorded in the background of the song's demo and after listening to that recording many times, the band felt that removing them would make the song look like it was missing something.

"Cold" received a video, which was released on 23 August 2019. It was filmed in Tampere and directed by Patric Ullaeus. "Storm the Armada" and "Who Failed the Most" discuss environmental concerns, with the latter addressing it in a political manner by asking whether humankind is choosing the right leaders, environment-wise.

The so-called Caleb saga, which started on Silence's "The End of This Chapter" and was continued on Reckoning Night's "Don't Say a Word", Unia's "Caleb", The Days of Grays's "Juliet" and The Ninth Hour's "Til Death's Done Us Apart"; is continued on the album with "The Last of the Lambs".

"Ismo's Got Good Reactors" is an instrumental track with musical references to several places around the World, including Japan. The title of the track is a comment a child made during a boat trip with a friend of Kakko. According to him, the outboard engine was about to fall but he managed to grab it and place it back, and the child said "Ismo's got good reactors!". The friend was actually named Mikko and the child actually meant "reactions".

"Demon's Cage" is a follow-up to The Ninth's Hour's "Fairytale" and "The Garden" is a "thank you" song for spouses in general.

"A Little Less Understanding" was the first song to be revealed, along with the album's title, cover and release date. According to Kakko, it is "lyrically somewhat of a follow up for 'I Have a Right' (from Stones Grow Her Name) and talks about the difficulty of making the right choices with the upbringing of a new human being". About selecting it as the album's first single, Kakko said he thinks it is "nowhere near the best song on the album", but the band had no idea which song to release first, so they ended up accepting advice from their manager, who though it "would function as a ramp towards the album being the most simple song on the album."

Kakko was initially unsure whether the longest song "The Raven Still Flies" would make it to the album, because he considered it "too complex and weird", but his bandmates approved it as soon as he showed it to them. The lyrics deal with the feeling of loss of a parent towards a missing child.

== Track listing ==
All songs written by Tony Kakko

| No. | Title | Length |
|---|---|---|
| 1. | "Message from the Sun" | 4:06 |
| 2. | "Whirlwind" | 6:31 |
| 3. | "Cold" | 4:28 |
| 4. | "Storm the Armada" | 5:08 |
| 5. | "The Last of the Lambs" | 4:22 |
| 6. | "Who Failed the Most" | 4:44 |
| 7. | "Ismo's Got Good Reactors" (Instrumental) | 3:43 |
| 8. | "Demon's Cage" | 4:57 |
| 9. | "A Little Less Understanding" | 4:34 |
| 10. | "The Raven Still Flies^{[a]}" | 7:39 |
| 11. | "The Garden" | 6:16 |
| Total length: | | 56:28 |

Japanese edition bonus track
| No. | Title | Length |
|---|---|---|
| 7. | "You Won't Fall" | 5:08 |
| Total length: | | 61:36 |

Notes

- ^{^[a]} The band's official website lists the song under the title "The Raven Still Flies With You"

== Personnel ==
- Tony Kakko – vocals, additional keyboards
- Elias Viljanen – guitars
- Pasi Kauppinen – bass
- Henrik Klingenberg – keyboards
- Tommy Portimo – drums

Technical personnel

- Mikko Tegelman, Pasi Kauppinen – mixing
- Svante Forsbäck – mastering at Chartmakers West
- Onni Wiljami – cover art

== Charts ==
| Chart (2019) | Peak position |
|---|---|
| Austrian Albums (Ö3 Austria) | 54 |
| Belgian Albums (Ultratop Wallonia) | 113 |
| Finnish Albums (Suomen virallinen lista) | 2 |
| French Albums (SNEP) | 133 |
| German Albums (Offizielle Top 100) | 26 |
| Japanese Albums (Oricon) | 69 |
| Spanish Albums (PROMUSICAE) | 35 |
| Swiss Albums (Schweizer Hitparade) | 22 |
