= The Ninth Hour (album) =

2016 studio album by Sonata Arctica

Studio album by Sonata Arctica
- Released: 7 October 2016
- Recorded: 2016 at Studio57 in Nedervetil, Finland
- Genre: Symphonic metal, power metal
- Length: 62:04
- Label: Nuclear Blast
- Producer: Sonata Arctica

Sonata Arctica chronology
Pariah's Child (2014)	The Ninth Hour (2016)	Talviyö (2019)

Singles from The Ninth Hour
- 1. "Closer to an Animal" Released: 11 August 2016; 2. "Life" Released: 16 September 2016; 3. "We Are What We Are" Released: 20 October 2016

Professional ratings
Review scores
Source	Rating
Angry Metal Guy	3.0/5
Distorted Sound	7/10
Metal.de	6/10
Metal Hammer.de	6/7
Metal Hammer	3/5 stars
Rock Hard	6.5/10

The Ninth Hour is the ninth studio album by Finnish power metal band Sonata Arctica. It was released on 7 October 2016 by Nuclear Blast.

== Background and recording ==
Vocalist, keyboardist and songwriter Tony Kakko confirmed Sonata Arctica would start recording their ninth studio album in April 2016 in several home studios in Finland, with the main recording and mixing taking place at the Studio57 in Nedervetil, Finland. He also described the artwork of this new album, explaining:

The artwork of our ninth studio album The Ninth Hour depicts a future utopian landscape on the background. Nature and human technologies are in balance. In the middle we have an hour glass contraption with a knob for us to meddle with. The right-hand side cup represents the nature side with no humans left, on the left we have the human dystopia after we have destroyed Nature. The idea I had was, that turning the knob will tilt the hour glass in one direction or another, and the other cup will slowly empty and that future will be erased. Biblically we are expected to repent and sacrifice on The Ninth Hour...to dive right back to a more mundane reality, it's a fact that we are currently living in critical, historical times. Our decisions will define the future. Not only ours as a race, but the future of this entire planet. We need to make sacrifices and in many cases we will repent our already made choices.

Kakko says musical inspiration for the album came by opening his eyes and ears and letting everything in. The album title is inspired by The Ninth Hour described in the Bible, which is the moment when people are supposed to sacrifice and remorse according to that book.

In a 2019 interview, Kakko called The Ninth Hour a "stressful album" due to its recording process:

We had the North American tour with Nightwish in the middle of the period when I was supposed to be writing the songs, but that was something that, at the time, we could not say no to. [...] when I got back home, I found myself inundated with work. I had to write so many songs from scratch. I didn't have anything! There was a lot of stress. You didn't see me much in the studio. I was at home, writing songs!

== Song information ==
The album opener and first single is "Closer to an Animal", a track that Kakko worked on two years before the album recording and which was brought around midway through the sessions. It has a reprise, titled "On the Faultline (Closure to an Animal)", which closes the regular edition of the album and marks keyboardist Henrik Klingenberg's first usage of an acoustic piano with the band. He mentions an influence of 80s music in his performance at the track.

"Life" was the first song in which the band worked on, but also the last to be finished, which made it the most altered song throughout the sessions. According to Kakko, "we had three different versions. I wasn't happy, the guys were totally excited by the first version and made it their own. But I thought it was pretty awful (laughs). I told them, 'We are putting it on hold.' I got back to it later and I think I got it right, edited some parts and changed things around".

"Fairytale" is a satire on the political events of the United States by the time of the album sessions. "We Are What We Are" was one of the few songs Kakko prepared as a demo for the band to listen to before the recording sessions. Unlike what he did for Pariah's Child, he did not record a demo for every song he wrote for The Ninth Hour. The song features Nightwish's Troy Donockley on Overton low whistle. Kakko showed it to him amidst their North American tour and suggested the guest performance.

Bassist Pasi Kauppinen saw some Finnish folk music influences on "Til Death's Done Us Apart". It is part of the so-called Caleb saga, a series of songs that started on Silence's "The End of This Chapter"; was continued on Reckoning Night's "Don't Say a Word", Unia's "Caleb" and The Days of Grays's "Juliet"; and would later continue with Talviyö's "The Last of the Lambs".

Kakko first introduced "Among the Shooting Stars" to the rest of the band during the Stones Grow Her Name sessions, but they rejected it. He then reworked it for this album. The song talks about a boy and girl that turn into werewolves. "Rise a Night" revisits their early power metal sound and talks about a group of adventurers leaving their dying planet to find a new place for their kind, eventually arriving on Earth.

"Fly, Navigate, Communicate" is a Devin Townsend Project-influenced song that compares human relations to flying procedures (flying, navigating, communicating). Kakko described it as "the hardest, most aggressive and speediest" song on the album. Some members were even reluctant about actually having it on the album. "Candle Lawns" is another song reminiscent of Stones Grow Her Name's sessions. Kakko wrote it during the mixing of the album for a movie project by a friend in America and then reworked it for The Ninth Hour. It is about a child describing a graveyard. In another interview, he described it as "a story about friends that are so close they are practically brothers and they go fighting together and have the same career. Then one of them gets killed and he tells his friend to take care of his family for him."

"White Pearl, Black Oceans – Part II, 'By the Grace of the Ocean'" continues the story introduced in Reckoning Night's "White Pearl, Black Oceans...". It was originally intended to be the album closing track. Says Kakko:

I started writing it in April. I had this sample of symphonic-sounding music. I thought it could make a great intro or part of the song. [...] There's lots of pressure behind it because the first [part] has lots of big meaning and was in the hearts of so many Sonata Arctica fans. [...] I had to be really careful that the second part would be a worthy sequel. I didn't make that task easy by killing the two main characters at the end of the first one (laughs).

== Track listing ==
All tracks are written by Tony Kakko, except where noted

No.	Title	Length
1.	"Closer to an Animal"	5:25
2.	"Life"	5:07
3.	"Fairytale"	6:39
4.	"We Are What We Are"	5:25
5.	"Till Death's Done Us Apart"	6:06
6.	"Among the Shooting Stars"	4:10
7.	"Rise a Night"	4:28
8.	"Fly, Navigate, Communicate"	4:27
9.	"Candle Lawns"	4:32
10.	"White Pearl, Black Oceans – Part II, "By the Grace of the Ocean""	10:13
11.	"On the Faultline (Closure to an Animal)"	5:34
Total length:		62:06

Digipak bonus track
No.	Title	Length
12.	"Run to You" (Bryan Adams cover (written by Adams and Jim Vallance))	3:34

Japanese bonus track
No.	Title	Length
10.	"The Elephant"	4:13

== Personnel ==
Credits adapted from the band's official website:

- Tony Kakko – vocals, additional keyboards, programming, arrangements
- Elias Viljanen – guitars
- Pasi Kauppinen – bass, fretless bass on "On the Faultline (Closure to an Animal)", recording and mixing
- Henrik Klingenberg – keyboards
- Tommy Portimo – drums

Guest musicians

- Troy Donockley – Overton low whistle on "We Are What We Are" (recorded at Warterworld Studio in North Yorkshire, England)
- Mikko P. Mustonen – orchestrations on "White Pearl, Black Oceans – Part II, 'By the Grace of the Ocean'"
- Aaron Newport – spoken word on "Closer to an Animal" and "The Elephant" (recorded at Eleven Productions, Indianapolis, Indiana, United States by Victor Jobe)
- Tónursson Chanters Group – additional backing vocals on "The Elephant" (recorded and mixed at Studio57 by Pasi Kauppinen)

Technical staff

- Svante Forsbäck – mastering at Chartmakers West
- Janne "ToxicAngel" Pitkänen – cover and layout
- Ville Juurikkala – band photography
- Sonata Arctica – producing and arrangements

== Charts ==
Chart (2016)	Peak position
Austrian Albums (Ö3 Austria)	43
Belgian Albums (Ultratop Flanders)	112
Belgian Albums (Ultratop Wallonia)	53
Finnish Albums (Suomen virallinen lista)	2
French Albums (SNEP)	96
German Albums (Offizielle Top 100)	22
Italian Albums (FIMI)	68
Japanese Albums (Oricon)	55
Scottish Albums (OCC)	96
Spanish Albums (PROMUSICAE)	86
Swedish Albums (Sverigetopplistan)	60
Swiss Albums (Schweizer Hitparade)	18
