= Ancestry (band) =

Mexican power metal band

- Logo of Ancestry

Background information
- Origin: Chihuahua, Chihuahua, Mexico
- Genres: Power metal, progressive metal
- Years active: 2007–present
- Label: Dynamo Records
- Members: Eduardo Tavasci; Luiz Monge; Pablo Mota; Fosco Castellanos; Derek Avila

Ancestry is a Mexican power metal band formed at the end of 2007 in Chihuahua, Chihuahua. The band's music incorporates melodic, symphonic, and progressive elements.

The band released its debut album, Revelations, in 2011, followed by Transitions. The latter was originally released in 2016 and later re-recorded and reissued in 2021 with Eduardo Tavasci on vocals. The album features a guest vocal performance by Tony Kakko of Sonata Arctica on the song "Darkest Day".

Ancestry has also received coverage in international metal media, including the British magazine Terrorizer, where their song "Reach for the Sky" appeared in the Fear Candy compilation series.

== History ==
=== Formation and early years ===
Ancestry was founded in late 2007 in Chihuahua, Chihuahua, by guitarist Luiz Monge and drummer Derek Avila. The initial lineup consisted of Lobo Gamboa on vocals, Luiz Monge and Eduardo Cuadros on guitars, César Castillo on bass, Alan Garcia on keyboards, and Derek Avila on drums. The band initially worked on original compositions while also performing cover songs by bands such as DragonForce, Sonata Arctica, and Stratovarius.

Their second live performance was as an opening act for Argentine heavy metal band Rata Blanca, marking an important early milestone for the band.

During 2008, Ancestry developed the material that would become its debut album and began performing live. After recording their demo, Rebuilding the Temples, Derek Avila left the band and was replaced by Edgar Salais on drums. Alan Garcia subsequently left the band, feeling that the responsibility of the band was too demanding, but returned shortly before the band traveled to Mexico City to begin recording Revelations.

In January 2009, Ancestry traveled to Mexico City to begin recording its debut album, Revelations, at Allory Studios. The band parted ways with Lobo Gamboa, which led to a hiatus during the second half of 2009 and the first half of 2010. Alex Gavilán later joined the band as vocalist, allowing Ancestry to resume work on the album. The lineup consisting of Alex Gavilán, Luiz Monge, Eduardo Cuadros, Alan Garcia, César Castillo, and Edgar Salais completed the recording of Revelations. Additional recordings were subsequently made at True Records Studios in El Paso, Texas, where the album was also mixed and mastered.

=== Revelations ===
In January 2009, Ancestry traveled to Mexico City to begin recording their debut album, Revelations, at Allory Studios. The project had originally been arranged with a Mexican record label that had expressed interest in the band and proposed supporting the album's production. The band contributed financially toward the production and recording expenses. However, after the band arrived in Mexico City, the representative of the label ceased contact, leaving the production expenses unresolved.

The engineers and producers working at Allory Studios, Andrew Friedman and José Luis Senil, were impressed by the project and offered to continue working with Ancestry without charging the band for the remaining studio work. The band recorded the instrumental foundation of the album in Mexico City, including drums, bass, rhythm guitars and keyboards.

The recording process was interrupted due to the departure of vocalist Lobo Gamboa. The band subsequently entered a hiatus during the second half of 2009 and the first half of 2010. Alex Gavilán later joined as vocalist, allowing Ancestry to resume work on the album. Gavilán recorded the lead and backing vocals, while Eduardo Cuadros and Luiz Monge contributed additional backing vocals.

Additional recordings were subsequently completed at True Records Studios in El Paso, Texas, where the album was mixed and mastered. The album was released independently on March 28, 2011.

=== Transitions ===
Following a hiatus beginning in 2013, Ancestry resumed activity in 2015 and began work on their second album, Transitions.

Before the recording of Transitions, the band parted ways with Edgar Salais who later returned before departing again. César Castillo also left the band before the recording of Transitions to focus on his family duties. Jorge Pretalia joined the band as drummer, while Pablo Mota joined on bass for a show opening for Deep Purple. Both became official members of the band after the show. The first version of Transitions was recorded with Alex Gavilán on vocals, Luiz Monge and Eduardo Cuadros on guitars, Alan Garcia on keyboards, Pablo Mota on bass, and Jorge Pretalia on drums. This version was released in 2016 and was later superseded by a re-recorded and remixed edition.

Following the departure of Alex Gavilán, Eduardo Cuadros, Alan Garcia, and Jorge Pretalia also left the band. Pablo Mota moved from bass to guitar, Eduardo Tavasci joined as lead vocalist, and Derek Avila returned as drummer. The band continued without a keyboardist. Fosco Castellanos later joined as bassist.

The album was recorded, produced and mixed by Luiz Monge at "Time Room Studios", and mastered by Jens Bogren at Fascination Street Studios. The album was subsequently re-recorded with Tavasci on vocals and remixed. The definitive edition was released in 2021 under Dynamo Records, a label headed by Eric de Haas.

The album features guest vocals by Tony Kakko of Sonata Arctica on the song "Darkest Day". Kakko also participated in an acoustic version of the song, which was included as a bonus track on Transitions.

=== Reception in Japan ===
Both Revelations and Transitions received a strong initial response in Japan. For each album, the first shipment sold out on its first day of sale. Additional copies were subsequently supplied, and each of the next two shipments also sold out on its first day of availability, resulting in three consecutive first-day sellouts for each album.

=== Revelations Ultimate Edition ===
In 2026, Ancestry revisited its debut album, Revelations, after beginning to recreate the album's keyboard parts for use as backing tracks during live performances. The band had been performing without a live keyboardist and initially recorded new instrumental parts to create the sequences and guides required for live performances. As a substantial portion of the album had already been recreated, the project was expanded into a complete re-recording.

Unlike a conventional remaster or remix, Revelations Ultimate Edition was recorded entirely from scratch, including all vocals and instrumental parts. The new recording features updated arrangements, expanded vocal and instrumental parts, and a more modern production approach. The project was intended to allow the songs to reach their full musical and production potential, which the band felt had not been fully represented by the production of the original 2011 recording.

The album was recorded, produced, mixed and mastered by guitarist Luiz Monge. It contains the ten original songs from Revelations, performed with Eduardo Tavasci on lead vocals, followed by four bonus tracks. The bonus material includes acoustic versions of "Screaming in Silence" and "Ashes Brought to Life", as well as two additional versions of "Reaper of Souls": one featuring Tim "Ripper" Owens on lead vocals and another performed as a duet by Owens and Tavasci.

Revelations Ultimate Edition was released physically on May 26, 2026, through Dynamo Records, and was made available on digital platforms on September 7, 2026.

== Musical style ==
Ancestry's musical style is primarily rooted in power metal, combining melodic, progressive and neoclassical elements. Melody is a central component of the band's musical identity, particularly through vocal lines, guitar leads, harmonized guitars and keyboard melodies. This approach allows the band to incorporate different riffs, rhythms, tempos and song structures while retaining a recognizable sound. Their compositions can range from fast-paced and technically demanding material to heavier, slower-paced sections, while also incorporating ballads and instrumental compositions.

The band's approach evolved between its first two albums. Revelations has a predominantly fast, melodic and technically demanding character, reflecting the band's early interest in challenging instrumental performances. Its arrangements feature numerous guitar solos, harmonized guitar passages and high-register vocals, while keyboards are used in a more traditional power metal style, including piano, harpsichord, strings, pads and choral textures. The album also incorporates heavier material and ballads, allowing it to explore different aspects of melodic metal.

Transitions represents a more mature approach to composition and songwriting. Compared with Revelations, it contains a greater emphasis on heavier riffs and slower-paced material, while its compositions place less emphasis on instrumental speed and more on musical development and structure. The vocal writing generally favors a lower and more moderate register, while the keyboard arrangements incorporate a more modern metal approach, including pads, arpeggiators and lead sounds alongside more traditional power metal elements. The album also features a more conceptually oriented and predominantly philosophical approach to its lyrics.

Progressive elements are present throughout Ancestry's music, including changes in rhythm and meter, contrasting sections, shifts in tempo and key, and unconventional song structures. These elements are particularly prominent in the instrumental compositions on the band's first two albums. Invocation of Power in D minor on Revelations is a neoclassical instrumental featuring guitar–keyboard unisons, harmonized guitars and extended instrumental passages, while Survival Instinct on Transitions is a progressive metal instrumental characterized by irregular meters, unconventional rhythms and progressive song structures.

The band's influences include power metal groups such as Stratovarius, Sonata Arctica, DragonForce and Angra, as well as musical influences outside metal. Rather than following a single stylistic model, Ancestry combines these influences with different approaches to melody, harmony, rhythm and arrangement, allowing its music to move between different metal styles while maintaining a consistent musical identity.

== Members ==
=== Current members ===
- Eduardo Tavasci – lead vocals (2017–present)
- Luiz Monge – lead guitar, backing vocals (2007–present)
- Pablo Mota – lead guitar, backing vocals (2018–present; bass 2015–2017)
- Fosco Castellanos – bass (2018–2024, 2025–present)
- Derek Avila – drums (2007–2008, 2017–present)

=== Former members ===
- "Lobo" Gamboa – lead vocals (2007–2009)
- Alex Gavilán – lead vocals (2010–2016)
- Edgar Salais – drums (2008–2011; 2011–2013)
- Jorge Pretalia – drums (2015–2017)
- Alán García – keyboards (2007–2009; 2009–2016)
- Eduardo Cuadros – guitars (2007–2017)
- César Castillo – bass (2007–2012)
- Fernando Gasson – bass (2013)
- Salvador Guerrero – bass (2024–2025)

== Discography ==
=== Studio albums ===
- Revelations (2011)
- Transitions (2016)

=== Reissues ===
- Transitions Ultimate Edition (2021)
- Revelations Ultimate Edition (2026)

=== Singles ===
- "Ashes to Oblivion"
- "Reach for the Sky"
- "Through the Haze of Darkness"
- "A Need for Light"
- "Darkest Day (Acoustic Version)"
- "Imminent Conquest"
- "Reaper of Souls" (duet version)

=== Music videos ===
- "Reaper of Souls"
- "Circle of Karma"
- "Ashes to Oblivion"
- "Reach for the Sky"
- "Through the Haze of Darkness"
- "Survival Instinct"
- "Darkest Day"
- "Darkest Day (Acoustic Version)"
- "Matter of Time"
- "Brightest Night"
- "Imminent Conquest"
- "Reaper of Souls" (duet version)
- "Invocation of Power in D minor"
