= We Are What We Are =

We Are What We Are can refer to:

- We Are What We Are (2010 film), a 2010 Mexican film
- We Are What We Are (2013 film), a 2013 American film
- "We Are What We Are", a song by Sonata Arctica on the album The Ninth Hour
