= The Days of Grays =

2009 studio album by Sonata Arctica

Studio album by Sonata Arctica
- Released: 8 September 2009
- Recorded: 2009 at Tico Tico Studio (drums and bass); Fantom Studios and Magic-7 Studio (guitars); Lanceland 2 and Kakkos-studio (keyboards); Studio 57 (hammond organ); Kakkos-studio (vocals); Rock Valley-Studios (cello); Great Sounds Studio (female vocals)
- Genres: Power metal, symphonic metal, progressive metal
- Length: 59:20
- Label: Nuclear Blast
- Producers: Tony Kakko, Sonata Arctica

Sonata Arctica chronology
Unia (2007)	The Days of Grays (2009)	Live in Finland (2011)

Singles from The Days of Grays
- 1. "The Last Amazing Grays" Released: 26 August 2009; 2. "Flag in the Ground" Released: September 2009

Professional ratings
Review scores
Source	Rating
AllMusic	3/5 stars
Lords of Metal	62/100
The Metal Circus	8/10 stars
Metal Storm	8/10 stars
Metal Symphony	3.5/5 stars

The Days of Grays is the sixth full-length studio album by Finnish power metal band Sonata Arctica. The album was released in South America on 8 September 2009, on 16 September in Finland, 18 September in Europe and 22 September in North America through Nuclear Blast. The special edition of the album includes the album along with an orchestral CD as a digipak.

It is the first album with guitarist Elias Viljanen and also the first since 1999's Ecliptica in which vocalist Tony Kakko also plays the keyboards.

== History ==
Sonata Arctica keyboardist Henrik Klingenberg described the album as:

a bit darker and maybe not so complex as [2007's] "Unia". Nevertheless, it's definitely not a back-to-the-roots album with fast power metal. All the trademark SONATA stuff is on there, solos, lots of singing [and] some slower songs.

—

The first single from the album is "The Last Amazing Grays". It was released by Nuclear Blast Records only in Finland on 26 August. The band ran a fan art contest to choose the artwork for their second announced single, "Flag in the Ground" which the press release calls "an uplifting story about a young couple fighting their way to freedom and their own land in North America back in early 1800s." The winner of the contest was Simo Heikkinen from Finland. The name for The Days of Grays apparently took a very long time to come to as the band had a name for the record that was deemed more appropriate "for a death metal band or something" according to Henrik Klingenberg. In a French interview, Tony Kakko stated that the original name was Deathaura, the name of a song on the album.

The track "Juliet" continues the so called Caleb saga, a series of songs that started on Silence's "The End of This Chapter", was continued on Reckoning Night's "Don't Say a Word", Unia's "Caleb" and would be later continued on The Ninth Hour's "Till Death's Done Us Apart" and Talviyö's "The Last of the Lambs".

"Everything Fades to Gray" features the lyrics "It's not fair, it's not fair, there was a time now" relating to the Twilight Zone episode Time Enough at Last and "The Truth Is Out There" is about the popular TV series The X-Files.

== Track listing ==
All music by Tony Kakko except "Nothing More" by Henrik Klingenberg, all lyrics by Tony Kakko, songs arranged by Sonata Arctica.

All tracks are written by Tony Kakko.

No.	Title	Length
1.	"Everything Fades to Gray (Instrumental)"	3:06
2.	"Deathaura": "The Premonition" (1:32); "The Witch-Hunt" (0:38); "Exposing the Heathen" (0:38); "Envy" (0:20); "The Fear" (0:38); "The Grudge" (0:32); "The Curse" (0:26); "The Flames" (0:20); "Endless Inquisition" (Instrumental) (2:04); "...Together, Today, for All Eternity" (0:50)"	7:58
3.	"The Last Amazing Grays"	5:40
4.	"Flag in the Ground"	4:08
5.	"Breathing"	3:55
6.	"Zeroes"	4:23
7.	"The Dead Skin"	6:14
8.	"Juliet"	5:59
9.	"No Dream Can Heal a Broken Heart"	4:33
10.	"As If the World Wasn't Ending"	3:49
11.	"The Truth Is Out There"	5:03
12.	"Everything Fades to Gray (Full Version)"	4:32
Total length:		59:20

Limited Edition bonus track
No.	Title	Length
13.	"In the Dark"	5:21

Limited Edition "Orchestral Bonus CD"
No.	Title	Length
1.	"Deathaura"	7:56
2.	"The Last Amazing Grays"	5:10
3.	"Flag in the Ground"	3:55
4.	"Juliet"	6:02
5.	"As If the World Wasn't Ending"	3:56
6.	"The Truth Is Out There"	5:06
7.	"In the Dark"	5:22
Total length:		37:27

U.S. Edition bonus track
No.	Title	Length
13.	"In My Eyes You're a Giant"	4:42

Japanese Edition bonus tracks
No.	Title	Length
13.	"Nothing More"	3:55
14.	"In My Eyes You're a Giant"	4:42

Japanese Edition "Live Bonus CD" - Official bootleg live around Europe 2008
No.	Title	Length
1.	"Paid in Full (Live in France)"	4:26
2.	"Black Sheep (Live in Italy)"	5:56
3.	"Draw Me (Live in Switzerland)"	4:06
4.	"It Won't Fade (Live in France)"	6:22
5.	"Replica (Live in Switzerland)"	4:38
6.	"Don't Say a Word (Live in Switzerland)"	6:08
Total length:		32:06

== Personnel ==
- Tony Kakko – vocals, additional keyboards
- Elias Viljanen – guitar
- Marko Paasikoski – bass guitar
- Henrik Klingenberg – keyboards, Hammond
- Tommy Portimo – drums
- Johanna Kurkela – female vocals (on 2, 9)
- Perttu Kivilaakso (Apocalyptica) – Cello (on 1, 6, 11, 12 and "In My Eyes You're a Giant")

== Charts ==
Chart (2009)	Peak position
Austrian Albums (Ö3 Austria)	52
Belgian Albums (Ultratop Wallonia)	96
Dutch Albums (Album Top 100)	50
Finnish Albums (Suomen virallinen lista)	2
French Albums (SNEP)	41
German Albums (Offizielle Top 100)	24
Italian Albums (FIMI)	56
Japanese Albums (Oricon)	40
Swedish Albums (Sverigetopplistan)	31
Swiss Albums (Schweizer Hitparade)	26

"The Last Amazing Grays"

Chart (2009)	Peak position
Official Finnish Charts	3

== Certifications ==
Region	Certification	Certified units/sales
Finland (Musiikkituottajat)	Gold	17,807

== Release history ==
Region	Date
South America	8 September 2009
Finland	16 September 2009
Japan	16 September 2009
Rest of Europe	18 September 2009
North America	22 September 2009
