= Don't Say a Word (EP) =

2004 EP by Sonata Arctica

EP by Sonata Arctica
- Released: 30 August 2004
- Recorded: Tico Tico Studios
- Genre: Power metal
- Length: 8:17 (single); 17:31 (EP)
- Label: Nuclear Blast
- Producer: Sonata Arctica; Markus Staiger

Sonata Arctica chronology
Reckoning Night (2004)	Don't Say a Word (2004)	Unia (2007)

Don't Say a Word is a song by Finnish metal band Sonata Arctica. It was released simultaneously as both a single and as the band's fourth EP released on 30 August 2004 through the label Nuclear Blast.

== Song information ==
Don't Say a Word is the second song (third chronologically) of the "Caleb Saga" — a series of connected songs that share a story about an abusive relationship.

The band has spoken favorably of the song. In 2014, guitarist Jani Liimatainen said that he "still thinks it is the best song Sonata has ever written." Elias Viljanen, who replaced Liimatainen as the band's guitarist in 2007, has said about the solo:

I made it a challenge for myself to play the solo of Don't Say A Word note for note the same way Jani had played it on the album. The guys kept rooting for me to play it anyway I wanted to, but I felt that solo was so damn good, challenging and impressive that I started working on duplicating it bit by bit.

== Track listing ==
=== Single ===
No.	Title	Writer(s)	Length
1.	"Don't Say a Word (Edit)"	Tony Kakko	4:15
2.	"World in My Eyes (Depeche Mode cover)"	Tony Kakko	4:02
Total length:			8:17

=== EP ===
No.	Title	Writer(s)	Length
1.	"Don't Say a Word (Edit)"	Tony Kakko	4:15
2.	"Ain't Your Fairytale"	Tony Kakko	5:18
3.	"World in My Eyes (Depeche Mode cover)"	Martin L. Gore	4:02
4.	"Two Minds, One Soul (Vanishing Point cover)"	Vanishing Point	3:56
Total length:			17:31

== Personnel ==
- Tony Kakko – vocals, keyboards
- Jani Liimatainen – guitars
- Marko Paasikoski – bass
- Henrik Klingenberg – keyboards, Hammond organ
- Tommy Portimo – drums

== Cover versions ==
"Don't Say a Word" was covered by German symphonic metal band Xandria for their 2015 EP Fire & Ashes.
