= Stones Grow Her Name =

2012 studio album by Sonata Arctica

Studio album by Sonata Arctica
- Released: May 16, 2012 (Finland); May 18, 2012 (Europe); May 22, 2012 (North America); May 23, 2012 (Japan)
- Recorded: November 2011 at Studio 57, Nedervetil, Finland (bass, drums, hammond); January and February 2012 at Kakkoslaatu Studios (lead and backing vocals, additional keyboards); January and February 2012 at Sonic Pump Studios (trumpets, saxophones, acoustic guitars, viola caipira, banjos, violin, double bass, additional backing vocals, violin); January 2012 at Tico Tico Studio, Kemi, Finland (double bass)
- Genres: Heavy metal, power metal, symphonic metal
- Length: 53:16
- Label: Nuclear Blast
- Producer: Sonata Arctica

Sonata Arctica chronology
Live in Finland (2011)	Stones Grow Her Name (2012)	Pariah's Child (2014)

Professional ratings
Review scores
Source	Rating
AllMusic	3/5 stars
Angry Metal Guy	2.0/5
Metal.de	8/10
MetalCrypt	3.5/5
MetalReview	71/100
Metal Storm	7/10 stars
Rock Hard	8.5/10

Stones Grow Her Name is the seventh studio album by Finnish power metal band Sonata Arctica. It was released in Finland on May 16, 2012, in Europe on May 18, 2012, in North America on May 22, 2012 and in Japan on May 23, 2012. It was the last album to feature longtime bassist Marko Paasikoski.

In a 2014 interview about the album's successor Pariah's Child, vocalist and songwriter Tony Kakko referred to it as "a rock album [more] than anything else", comparing it to the more back-to-the roots sound of the 2014 band's release. Yet in a 2019 interview promoting the band's then new album Talviyö, Kakko said Stones Grow Her Name marked "some kind of maturity point for us", citing him becoming a father for the first time as an influence.

== Song information ==
Regarding the song "Cinderblox", Kakko stated:

"As you might figure, it started out as a... joke. Me fooling around with this banjo sound I came across. Wrote a riff which turned into a song. And when we then decided it's gonna be recorded for this album all we had to do was to find someone to play the banjo. We did! [...] This is the one song that still makes me smile every time I hear it."

"Somewhere Close to You" was originally written for a possible solo release by Kakko, but ended up on the album. "Losing My Insanity" was originally written by Tony Kakko for Ari Koivunen's Fuel for the Fire. The final two tracks, "Wildfire, Part: II – One With the Mountain" and "Wildfire, Part: III – Wildfire Town, Population: 0" continue the story introduced in "Wildfire" from Reckoning Night.

== Track list ==
All tracks are written by Tony Kakko.

No.	Title	Length
1.	"Only the Broken Hearts (Make You Beautiful)"	3:23
2.	"Shitload of Money"	4:52
3.	"Losing My Insanity"	4:03
4.	"Somewhere Close to You"	4:13
5.	"I Have a Right"	4:47
6.	"Alone in Heaven"	4:31
7.	"The Day"	4:14
8.	"Cinderblox"	4:03
9.	"Don't Be Mean"	3:17
10.	"Wildfire, Part: II – One with the Mountain"	7:53
11.	"Wildfire, Part: III – Wildfire Town, Population: 0"	8:00
Total length:		53:16

European and North American Bonus Track
No.	Title	Length
12.	"Tonight I Dance Alone"	3:27
Total length:		56:43

Japanese Bonus Track
No.	Title	Length
12.	"One-Two-Free-Fall"	3:49
Total length:		57:05

== Tour Edition ==
On October 24, 2012 a special 2 disc "Tour Edition" of the album was released in Japan to commemorate the band's appearance at the Loud Park Festival. The first disc contains the standard Japanese version of the album with "One-Two- Free-Fall" serving as the bonus track. The second disc features acoustic versions of "Only the Broken Hearts (Make You Beautiful)" "I Have a Right" "Alone In Heaven" and "Somewhere Close to You" respectively.

== Personnel ==
- Tony Kakko – vocals, additional keyboards
- Elias Viljanen – guitars
- Marko Paasikoski – bass
- Henrik Klingenberg – keyboards
- Tommy Portimo – drums

=== Guest artists ===
- Mika Mylläri – trumpet on "Shitload of Money"
- Sakari Kukko – saxophone on "Shitload of Money"
- Peter Engberg – acoustic guitar, viola caipira and banjo on "I Have a Right", "Alone in Heaven", "The Day", "Don't Be Mean", "Cinderblox" and "Wildfire, Part:II – One with the Mountain"
- Timo Kotipelto – additional backing vocals on "Only the Broken Hearts (Make You Beautiful)", "Shitload of Money", "I Have a Right" and "Alone in Heaven"
- Lauri Valkonen – double bass at "Cinderblox" and "Wildfire, Part:II – One with the Mountain"
- Pekka Kuusisto – violin at "Don't Be Mean", "Cinderblox", "Wildfire, Part:II – One with the Mountain" and "Wildfire, Part:III – Wildfire Town, Population: 0"
- Anna Lavender – spoken parts on "I Have a Right"
- Mikko P. Mustonen – Orchestration on "Wildfire, Part:III – Wildfire Town, Population: 0"

=== Additional personnel ===
- Masi Hukari – recording assistant and lyrics proofreader
- Nino Laurenne – producer
- Ahti Kortelainen – studio master technician
- Mikko Karmila – mixing
- Pelri Ahvenainen – recording engineer
- Ville – monitor technician
- Svante Forsbäck – mastering engineer

== Charts ==
Chart (2012)	Peak position
Austrian Albums (Ö3 Austria)	29
Belgian Albums (Ultratop Flanders)	131
Belgian Albums (Ultratop Wallonia)	64
Dutch Albums (Album Top 100)	72
Finnish Albums (Suomen virallinen lista)	1
French Albums (SNEP)	74
German Albums (Offizielle Top 100)	24
Hungarian Albums (MAHASZ)	13
Italian Albums (FIMI)	72
Japanese Albums (Oricon)	44
Norwegian Albums (VG-lista)	35
Spanish Albums (Promusicae)	87
Swedish Albums (Sverigetopplistan)	37
Swiss Albums (Schweizer Hitparade)	21
US Billboard Independent	43

== Certifications ==
Region	Certification	Certified units/sales
Finland (Musiikkituottajat)	Gold	12,362
