= Ecliptica =

1999 studio album by Sonata Arctica

Studio album by Sonata Arctica
- Released: 22 November 1999; 24 October 2014 (15th anniversary edition)
- Recorded: 1999 at Tico Tico Studio; 2014 (15th anniversary edition)
- Genre: Power metal
- Length: 47:11
- Labels: Spinefarm; Nuclear Blast (15th anniversary edition)
- Producer: Sonata Arctica

Sonata Arctica chronology
Ecliptica (1999)	Successor (2000)

15th anniversary edition artwork

Professional ratings
Review scores
Source	Rating
Allmusic	2/5 stars
Metal Storm	8.8/10

Ecliptica is the first full-length album by the power metal band Sonata Arctica. It was released in 1999 through Spinefarm Records in Europe and through Century Media in the United States. It is the band's only album featuring bassist Janne Kivilahti. In 2016, vocalist, keyboardist and songwriter Tony Kakko described the album as "like the extension of our demo, we didn't know what we were doing so that reflects on the album and makes kind of cute if you will."

In 2017, Loudwire ranked it as the 16th best power metal album of all time.

== Songs and themes ==
Regarding the track "Blank File", which covers the topic of privacy on the Internet, vocalist Tony Kakko once stated:

I had a vision of how things would be in the future [laughs]. Now that we're in the future, it's not as horrendously bad, although people are being really bad about their privacy. If you upload your family pictures online somewhere, even if you think you've erased them from the server, they're still there. "Blank File" is all about that. [...] I didn't consider computers per se at the time. [...] The starting point was all of the phone cards we had at the time, and when you're shopping on the concord, someone knew what you bought. I found that somehow, disturbing. It's great to realize that after so long, your songs are still valid.

The theme would be again mentioned in the band's next album, Silence, on the track "Weballergy".

In the song "Letter to Dana", the title character, Dana O'Hara, is named after The X-Files's Dana Scully.

== 15th anniversary re-recording ==
In 2014, Sonata Arctica announced through their Facebook page that they had re-recorded the entire album for its 15th anniversary. The new edition is titled Ecliptica - Revisited; 15th Anniversary Edition and was released on 24 October 2014, with the same track-listing as the original regular edition release plus one unreleased bonus track.

Commenting on the album, keyboardist Henrik Klingenberg (who was not a member of the band at the time Ecliptica was released) said:

When it first was suggested to us by our Japanese label that we'd re-record our debut album, it felt a bit weird, but somehow the idea grew on us. Being that only Tony [Kakko] and Tommy [Portimo] played on the original one, we thought that it would be a fun thing to do. We're definitely not trying to re-write history. The original "Ecliptica" is the starting point of this band and a very special album with a certain feel of innocence and enthusiasm which cannot be recreated as such since we're not teenagers anymore. Having said that, this new version is more of a tribute and an update on how these songs sound when played by our current lineup. We wanted to stay true to the original album as much as possible and not turn this into some weird re-arranged project where you couldn't tell which song was being played.

The re-recording's first single was "Kingdom for a Heart", released digitally on 12 September 2014. According to Klingenberg, the song was chosen in order to "represent the overall sound of the album".

On an interview held after the album release, Klingenberg said the only significant changes applied to the album were the lower keys and the rearranged solos, and that the band resisted the "temptation" to give the songs a "complete overhaul". He also said most of the album was recorded in the band members' own home studios, during breaks from their Pariah's Child World Tour. He also commented:

I think we all play much better these days than 10 or 15 years ago, so of course that affected the new recording as well; however, part of the charm with the original Ecliptica is that it wasn't played with a click track so the tempos go up and down and also there's an element of danger - the guys were young and their playing wasn't as tight as it is now. I think that kinda youthful enthusiasm is something that is missing from the new one and, of course, it's impossible to recreate that kind of feel.

== Track listing ==
All tracks are written by Tony Kakko except "8th Commandment" and "Picturing the Past", co-written by Jani Liimatainen.

No.	Title	Length
1.	"Blank File"	4:05
2.	"My Land"	4:36
3.	"8th Commandment"	3:41
4.	"Replica"	4:55
5.	"Kingdom for a Heart"	3:51
6.	"FullMoon"	5:05
7.	"Letter to Dana"	6:00
8.	"UnOpened"	3:42
9.	"Picturing the Past"	3:36
10.	"Destruction Preventer"	7:40
Total length:		47:11

Bonus track on Korean, Japanese, and South American editions
No.	Title	Length
11.	"Mary-Lou"	4:30
Total length:		51:41

Remastered 2008 Edition bonus tracks
No.	Title	Length
11.	"Mary-Lou"	4:32
12.	"Letter to Dana (Returned to Sender)"	4:38
Total length:		56:21

15th Anniversary Edition bonus tracks
No.	Title	Writer(s)	Length
11.	"Mary-Lou" (Bonus track on Korean, Japanese, and South American editions)		4:32
12.	"I'm Haunted" (Bonus track on Japanese edition - Rerecorded song from their days as Tricky Beans.)		2:43
13.	"I Can't Dance" (Genesis cover)	Tony Banks, Phil Collins, Mike Rutherford	3:52
Total length:			58:16

== Personnel ==
- Tony Kakko – vocals, keyboards
- Jani Liimatainen – guitars
- Janne Kivilahti – bass
- Tommy Portimo – drums
- Raisa Aine – flute on "Letter to Dana"

=== Technical staff ===
- Ahti Kortelainen - production at Tico Tico Studios
- Mikko Karmila - mixing at Finnvox Studios
- Mika Jussila - mastering at Finnvox Studios

=== 15th anniversary edition line-up ===
- Tony Kakko – vocals, keyboards
- Elias Viljanen – guitars
- Pasi Kauppinen – bass
- Henrik Klingenberg - keyboards
- Tommy Portimo – drums

== Charts ==
Chart (1999)	Peak position
Finnish Albums (Suomen virallinen lista)	18
Japanese Albums (Oricon)	57

== Certifications ==
Region	Certification	Certified units/sales
Finland (Musiikkituottajat)	Gold	31,760
