= Silent Voices (band) =

Finnish progressive metal band

- Origin: Kokkola, Finland
- Genres: Progressive metal
- Years active: 1995–present
- Label: Inner Wound Recordings
- Website: Silent Voices

Silent Voices is a Finnish progressive metal band from Kokkola, Finland. It was formed in 1995 by Henrik Klingenberg (keyboards), Pasi Kauppinen (bass), Timo Kauppinen (guitars), and Jukka-Pekka Koivisto (drums). A few years after their formation, the lineup saw the addition of Michael Henneken on vocals, who left in 2006. In September 2013, the band announced that their new singer was Teemu Koskela (Winterborn), and in May 2014 founding member Jukka-Pekka Koivisto left and was replaced with Jani "Hurtsi" Hurula (Isänta Meidän).

The band has published an EP (with Klingenberg on vocals) and four studio albums, and are currently in the process of promoting their fourth and are touring whenever possible.

Their latest album Reveal The Change was released on November 29, 2013 in Europe and December 03 in North America.

== Band members ==
=== Current members ===
- Timo Kauppinen – guitars (1995–present)
- Pasi Kauppinen – bass (1995–present)
- Jani "Hurtsi" Hurula – drums (2014–present)
- Henrik Klingenberg – keyboards (1995–present)
- Teemu Koskela – vocals (2013–present)

=== Former Members ===
- Michael Henneken – vocals (1997–2006)
- Jukka-Pekka Koivisto – drums (1995–2014)

== Discography ==
- Nothing Lasts Forever (EP) (1997)
- Chapters of Tragedy (2002)
- Infernal (2004)
- Building Up the Apathy (2006)
- Reveal the Change (2013)
