= Unia =

2007 studio album by Sonata Arctica

Studio album by Sonata Arctica
- Released: 25 May 2007
- Recorded: December 2006 – January 2007 at Tico Tico Studio; Sonic Pump Studio (guitars, acoustic guitars); Studio 57 (string, hammond organ); 2ndrate Soundcave (vocals, backing vocals, keyboards); Jani's Lair (guitarsolos); The Lanceland Room (keyboards, keyboard solos)
- Genre: Power metal, progressive metal
- Length: 58:35
- Label: Nuclear Blast
- Producer: Tony Kakko, Sonata Arctica

Sonata Arctica chronology
| Reckoning Night (2004) | Unia (2007) | The Days of Grays (2009) |

Singles from Unia
- 1. "Paid in Full" Released: 27 April 2007

Professional ratings
Review scores
| Source | Rating |
|---|---|
| Allmusic | 3/5 stars |

Unia (English: Dreams), released on 25 May 2007, is the fifth full-length studio album by the power metal band Sonata Arctica, following the album Reckoning Night. The first single from the album was "Paid in Full", released on 27 April 2007. This is also the last album that features guitarist Jani Liimatainen, who was later replaced by Elias Viljanen after the album was released.

The album was mixed at Finnvox Studios, and mastered at Cutting Room Studios in Stockholm, Sweden. The album was also released as a limited edition noble book in 7" size (1000 copies), exclusively available via mailorder from Nuclear Blast records. The limited edition came with a differing track listing and bonus tracks "To Create a Warlike Feel" and "Out in the Fields".

== Sound and themes ==
Unia is darker and more aggressive than Sonata Arctica's earlier work, with mid-tempo songs, more inclusion of 7 string guitars and a minimal amount of solos. It has been described as a significant "turning point".

Vocalist Tony Kakko has once admitted that Unia being released just after Reckoning Night "was probably a shock to many people". He also described it as "a liberating experience. From there we took slowly some other direction". Commenting further on the album, he also stated:

Back then our band thought we are in some kind of pit and that we needed to do something different. To be honest, in that time it would have been better to do a solo album, but there was no time nor possibility for it. Unia is one of the closest albums to me personally.

Drummer and founding member Tommy Portimo said that Unia "brought many good things. I think our band needed that little shaking. [...] That album felt very natural. Although we realized it was very far from what we were before. But it was just a natural shaking." Guitarist Jani Liimatainen considers it his least favorite album among the ones he recorded with the band, calling it "too experimental for my taste".

The track "Caleb" continues what the band refers to as "the so-called Caleb saga", a series of songs that started on Silence's "The End of This Chapter" and is continued on Reckoning Night's "Don't Say a Word", The Days of Grays's "Juliet"; The Ninth Hour's "Till Death's Done Us Apart" and Talviyö's "The Last of the Lambs".

== Track listing ==
All tracks are written by Tony Kakko, songs arranged by Sonata Arctica.

| No. | Title | Length |
|---|---|---|
| 1. | "In Black and White" | 5:03 |
| 2. | "Paid in Full" | 4:24 |
| 3. | "For the Sake of Revenge" | 3:23 |
| 4. | "It Won't Fade" | 5:58 |
| 5. | "Under Your Tree" | 5:14 |
| 6. | "Caleb" | 6:16 |
| 7. | "The Vice" | 4:08 |
| 8. | "My Dream's But a Drop of Fuel for a Nightmare" | 6:13 |
| 9. | "The Harvest" | 4:21 |
| 10. | "The Worlds Forgotten, the Words Forbidden" | 2:57 |
| 11. | "Fly With the Black Swan" | 5:08 |
| 12. | "Good Enough Is Good Enough" | 5:30 |
| Total length: | | 58:35 |

European Edition
| No. | Title | Length |
|---|---|---|
| 10. | "To Create a Warlike Feel" | 5:03 |
| 11. | "The Worlds Forgotten, the Words Forbidden" | 2:57 |
| 12. | "Fly with the Black Swan" | 5:08 |
| 13. | "Good Enough Is Good Enough" | 5:30 |
| Total length: | | 63:38 |

Japanese bonus tracks
| No. | Title | Length |
|---|---|---|
| 13. | "They Follow" | 4:50 |
| 14. | "Out in the Fields" (Gary Moore cover) | 4:06 |
| 15. | "My Dream's But a Drop of Fuel for a Nightmare (Instrumental)" | 6:13 |
| Total length: | | 73:44 |

== Personnel ==
Sonata Arctica

- Tony Kakko − vocals, additional keyboards
- Jani Liimatainen − guitars, acoustic guitars (on tracks 11, 14)
- Marko Paasikoski − bass guitar
- Henrik Klingenberg − lead keyboards, hammond organ, piano (on track 2)
- Tommy Portimo − drums

Additional personnel

- Selestina Choir on "In Black and White", "Under Your Tree", "To Create a Warlike Feel" and "Caleb" conducted by Tarja Vanhala.
- Acoustic guitars, Bouzouki, Chromaharp, Cavaquinho and Q-chord on "They Follow", "Under Your Tree", "The Harvest", "It Won't Fade" and "Fly With the Black Swan" by Peter Engberg.
- Finnish vocals in "To Create a Warlike Feel" by Jarkko Martikainen
- Opening narration in "Caleb" by Milla V
- Vocals, "whatevergod..." ("Caleb") and backing vocals, "just passion and rage" ("In Black and White") performed by Starbuck.

String orchestra on "Good Enough Is Good Enough"

- Tuomas Airola − cello
- Elar Kuiv − violin
- Kati Niemelä − violin/viola
- Anna-Leena Kangas − viola
- Oskari Hannula − double bass
- Bowed string instruments arranged and conducted by Tuomas Airola.

== Charts ==
| Chart (2007) | Peak position |
|---|---|
| Austrian Albums (Ö3 Austria) | 62 |
| Finnish Albums (Suomen virallinen lista) | 1 |
| French Albums (SNEP) | 101 |
| German Albums (Offizielle Top 100) | 35 |
| Japanese Albums (Oricon) | 23 |
| Swedish Albums (Sverigetopplistan) | 27 |
| Swiss Albums (Schweizer Hitparade) | 40 |

"Paid in Full"

| Chart (2007) | Peak position |
|---|---|
| Official Finnish Charts | 1 |

== Certifications ==
| Region | Certification | Certified units/sales |
|---|---|---|
| Finland (Musiikkituottajat) | Gold | 24,604 |
