= Silence (Sonata Arctica album) =

2001 studio album by Sonata Arctica

Studio album by Sonata Arctica
- Released: 21 June 2001
- Recorded: 2000–2001
- Studio: Tico Tico Studio
- Genre: Power metal
- Length: 61:53
- Label: Spinefarm
- Producer: Sonata Arctica

Sonata Arctica chronology
Successor (EP) (2000)	Silence (2001)	Winterheart's Guild (2003)

Professional ratings
Review scores
Source	Rating
The Metal Observer	4.5/5 stars
Chronicles of Chaos	8/10 stars
Kerrang!	4/5 stars
Lords of Metal	9.6/10 stars

Silence is the second full-length album by Finnish power metal band Sonata Arctica, released in 2001 through Spinefarm Records. It is the only studio album to feature keyboardist Mikko Härkin, and the first album with original member Marko Paasikoski on bass, who returned to the band the previous year. Stratovarius lead singer Timo Kotipelto sang guest vocals on the album.

== Concept and themes ==
The cover art, featuring a landscape divided into night, summer and winter, was meant to depict nature. However, Tony explained that the cover was not supposed to feature too much symbolism, except for the footprints leading away from the campfire. He explained:

That thing is like representing a snippet of your life that really makes you go one way or the other. Either way can be the good way, not the bad way necessarily. The album is one of those things that's a bit different, a more difficult album.... make it go one way or the other.

The title of the album was at first supposed to be longer, but Kakko's then-girlfriend suggested "silence" and he reflected on how important silence was for him:

[silence] is a creating force because when you're on the road for half a year or something like that I can't make new music at all so I need something like a month or two to get my head working again. So that's my "silence" it seems.

The second track "Weballergy" is considered by Kakko to be a sequel to Ecliptica's "Blank File", as both of them cover the theme of Internet privacy.

"The End of This Chapter" starts the so-called Caleb saga, a series of songs that is continued in Reckoning Night's "Don't Say a Word", Unia's "Caleb", The Days of Grays's "Juliet", The Ninth Hour's "Till Death's Done Us Apart", and Talviyö's "The Last of the Lambs".

"The Power of One" is the longest Sonata Arctica song to date, at a length of 10:43, not including an extra minute of silence followed by an outtake from the narrator.

== Track listing ==
All songs written by Tony Kakko

No.	Title	Length
1.	"...Of Silence"	1:17
2.	"Weballergy"	3:51
3.	"False News Travel Fast"	5:18
4.	"The End of This Chapter"	7:00
5.	"Black Sheep"	3:42
6.	"Land of the Free"	4:24
7.	"Last Drop Falls"	5:13
8.	"San Sebastian (Revisited)"	4:37
9.	"Sing in Silence"	3:51
10.	"Revontulet"	1:32
11.	"Tallulah"	5:20
12.	"Wolf & Raven"	4:15
13.	"The Power of One"	11:33
Total length:		61:53

Remastered 2008 Edition bonus tracks
No.	Title	Length
14.	"Respect the Wilderness" (also appears in Japanese edition before "The Power of One")	3:52
15.	"Peacemaker"	3:31
16.	"Wolf & Raven (Remake 2008)"	4:25
Total length:		73:41

== Personnel ==
Sonata Arctica

- Tony Kakko – vocals, additional keyboards
- Jani Liimatainen – guitars
- Mikko Härkin – keyboards
- Marko Paasikoski – bass
- Tommy Portimo – drums

Guest vocalists

- Timo Kotipelto – backing vocals and last line (on track 3)
- Nik Van-Eckmann – male voices (on tracks: 1, 4, 7 and 13)
- Renay Gonzalez – female voice (on track 4)

Technical staff

- Produced by Ahti Kortelainen at Tico Tico Studios
- Mixed by Mikko Karmila at Finnvox Studios in April 2001
- Mastered by Mika Jussila at Finnvox Studios
- Cover art and logo by Eric Philipp
- Inlay drawings by Tero Junkkila
- Original logo concept by Janne "ToxicAngel" Pitkänen
- Art Direction and background photos by T. Kakko
- Band photo by Toni Härkönen

== Charts ==
Chart (2001)	Peak position
Finnish Albums (Suomen virallinen lista)	3
Japanese Albums (Oricon)	16

== Certifications ==
Region	Certification	Certified units/sales
Finland (Musiikkituottajat)	Gold	27,188
