= Winterheart's Guild =

2003 studio album by Sonata Arctica

Studio album by Sonata Arctica
- Released: 21 February 2003
- Recorded: September – November 2002
- Studio: Tico Tico Studio
- Genre: Power metal
- Length: 54:57
- Label: Spinefarm
- Producer: Sonata Arctica

Sonata Arctica chronology
Songs of Silence – Live in Tokyo (2002)	Winterheart's Guild (2003)	Reckoning Night (2004)

Winterheart's Guild is the third studio album by the power metal band Sonata Arctica. It was released in 2003 through Spinefarm Records. In a 2014 interview, vocalist, keyboardist and songwriter Tony Kakko said inspiration for writing "The Ruins of My Life" came from the film Braveheart. In 2019, he would refer to the album's recording process as a "nightmare" because he only had "two or three" songs ready when the band went in the studio.

== Reception ==
Professional ratings
Review scores
Source	Rating
AllMusic	2/5 stars
Sputnikmusic	4/5

Loudwire named the album at eleventh in their list "Top 25 Power Metal Albums of All Time." Metal Hammer also included it in their 2016 list of 10 essential power metal albums.

== Track listing ==
All songs written by Tony Kakko

No.	Title	Length
1.	"Abandoned, Pleased, Brainwashed, Exploited"	5:36
2.	"Gravenimage"	7:00
3.	"The Cage"	4:36
4.	"Silver Tongue"	3:58
5.	"The Misery"	5:08
6.	"Victoria's Secret"	4:43
7.	"Champagne Bath"	3:57
8.	"Broken"	5:18
9.	"The Rest of the Sun Belongs to Me" (Japanese edition bonus track)	4:22
10.	"The Ruins of My Life"	5:14
11.	"Draw Me" (In the Japanese edition, the silence after 5:05 between studio outtakes are removed.)	9:27
Total length:		54:57

== Personnel ==
- Tony Kakko – vocals, keyboards
- Jani Liimatainen – guitar
- Marko Paasikoski – bass guitar
- Tommy Portimo – drums
- Jens Johansson – keyboard solos on "The Cage", "Silver Tongue", "Victoria's Secret" and "Champagne Bath"

Technical personnel

- Recorded by Ahti Kortelainen at Tico Tico Studios in September–November 2002
- Mixed by Mikko Karmila at Finnvox Studios and mastered by Mika Jussila at Finnvox Studios in November–December 2002.
- Produced by Sonata Arctica

== Charts ==
Chart (2003)	Peak position
Finnish Albums (Suomen virallinen lista)	3
French Albums (SNEP)	63
German Albums (Offizielle Top 100)	88
Japanese Albums (Oricon)	18

== Certifications ==
Region	Certification	Certified units/sales
Finland (Musiikkituottajat)	Gold	24,986
