= Reckoning Night =

2004 studio album by Sonata Arctica

Studio album by Sonata Arctica
- Released: 22 September 2004
- Recorded: April – June 2004
- Studio: Tico Tico Studio
- Genre: Power metal
- Length: 55:20
- Label: Nuclear Blast
- Producers: Sonata Arctica, Markus Staiger

Sonata Arctica chronology
Winterheart's Guild (2003)	Reckoning Night (2004)	Unia (2007)

Professional ratings
Review scores
Source	Rating
Allmusic	4.5/5 stars
Metal Storm	9/10 stars
Lords of Metal	(9.2/10)

Reckoning Night is the fourth full-length studio album by the Finnish power metal band Sonata Arctica, as well as the first to feature keyboardist Henrik Klingenberg. The track "Don't Say a Word" continues the so called Caleb saga, a series of songs that started on Silence's "The End of This Chapter" and is continued on Unia's "Caleb", The Days of Grays's "Juliet", The Ninth Hour's "Till Death's Done Us Apart", and Talviyö's "The Last of the Lambs".

== Track listing ==
All tracks are written by Tony Kakko, except for "My Selene" by Jani Liimatainen

No.	Title	Length
1.	"Misplaced"	4:42
2.	"Blinded No More"	5:33
3.	"Ain't Your Fairytale"	5:26
4.	"Reckoning Day, Reckoning Night..."	3:21
5.	"Don't Say a Word"	5:48
6.	"The Boy Who Wanted to Be a Real Puppet"	4:44
7.	"My Selene"	5:28
8.	"Wildfire"	4:36
9.	"White Pearl, Black Oceans..."	8:47
10.	"Shamandalie"	4:04
11.	"Wrecking the Sphere" (Japanese Bonus Track)	7:02
12.	"Jam" (Hidden Track)	2:51
Total length:		55:20

- The hidden track "Jam" is on all albums, but is often mistaken for the Japanese/Korean-only bonus track "Wrecking the Sphere". "Jam" is a jammed Flamenco-style tune (as the name implies) and is significantly shorter than "Wrecking the Sphere", which is a typical song.
- Also released as limited and numbered seabag (1,000 copies, available only per Nuclear Blast mailorder) with digipack CD, T-Shirt and gimmicks.

== Personnel ==
- Tony Kakko – Vocals
- Jani Liimatainen – Guitars
- Henrik Klingenberg – Keyboards, Deep/harsh backing vocals (on "Wildfire")
- Marko Paasikoski – Bass
- Tommy Portimo – Drums
- Nik Van-Eckmann – Male voice (on "Don't Say a Word", "White Pearl, Black Oceans..." and "Wildfire")

== Charts ==
Chart (2004)	Peak position
Finnish Albums (Suomen virallinen lista)	2
French Albums (SNEP)	132
German Albums (Offizielle Top 100)	71
Japanese Albums (Oricon)	14
Swedish Albums (Sverigetopplistan)	57
Swiss Albums (Schweizer Hitparade)	85

== Certifications ==
Region	Certification	Certified units/sales
Finland (Musiikkituottajat)	Gold	19,733
