= Sonata Arctica =

Finnish power metal band

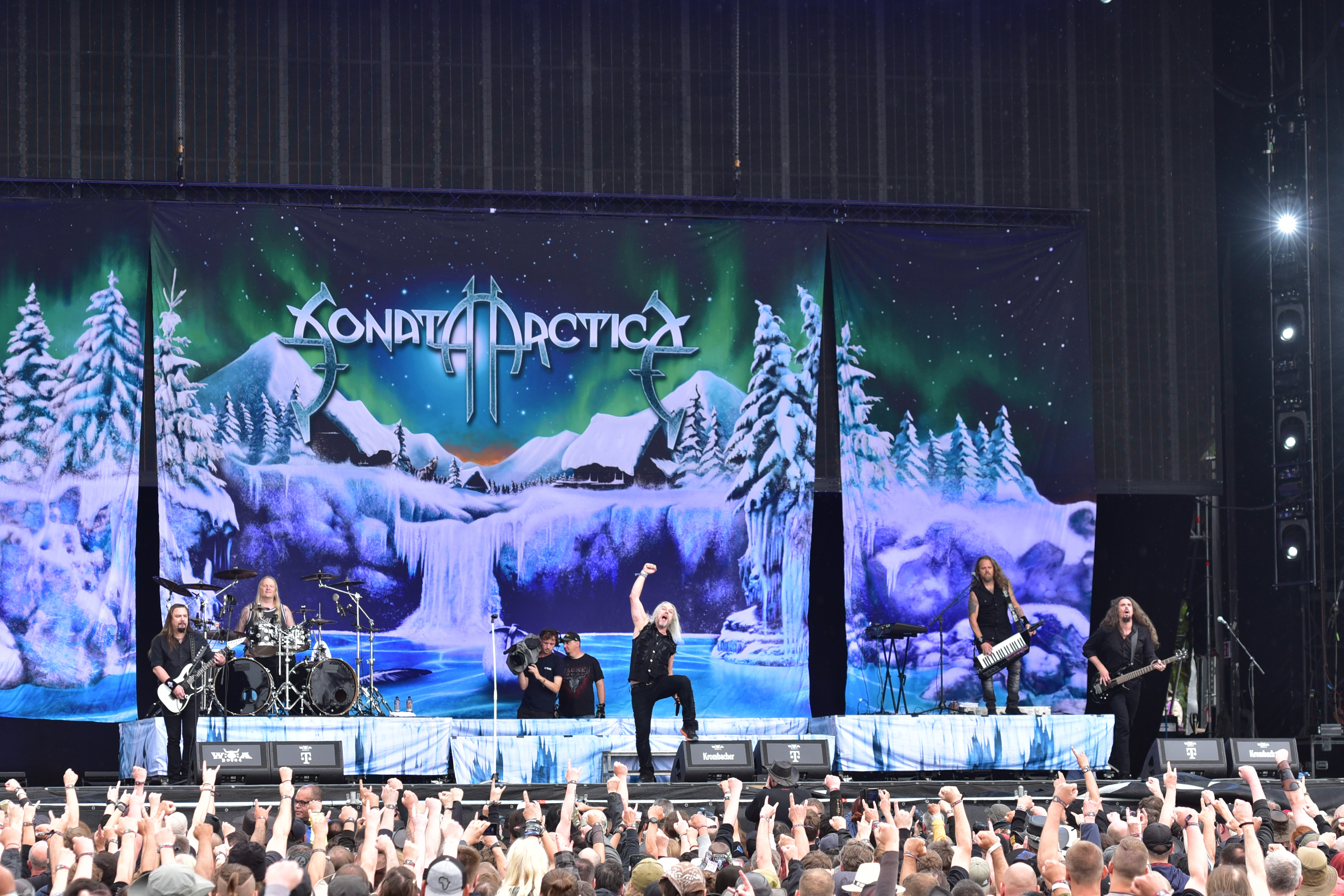
- Sonata Arctica performing live at Wacken Open Air 2024

Background information
- Also known as: Tricky Beans (1995–1997); Tricky Means (1997–1999)
- Origin: Kemi, Finland
- Genres: Power metal; symphonic metal; progressive metal
- Years active: 1995–present
- Labels: Spinefarm, Nuclear Blast, Atomic Fire
- Members: Tommy Portimo; Tony Kakko; Henrik Klingenberg; Elias Viljanen; Pasi Kauppinen
- Past members: Jani Liimatainen; Marko Paasikoski; Pentti Peura; Janne Kivilahti; Mikko Härkin
- Website: www.sonataarctica.info

Sonata Arctica is a Finnish power metal band from the town of Kemi. Created as a hard rock band named Tricky Beans, they later changed to Tricky Means and finally to Sonata Arctica, when they shifted to power metal. The current lineup consists of drummer Tommy Portimo, lead singer Tony Kakko, keyboardist Henrik Klingenberg, guitarist Elias Viljanen and bassist Pasi Kauppinen. All the musicians of the band's history except Portimo also acted as backing vocalists.

As of 2024, the band has released eleven full-length albums (three via Spinefarm Records, eight via Nuclear Blast, and one via Atomic Fire).

== History ==
=== Formation and early years (1996–1999) ===
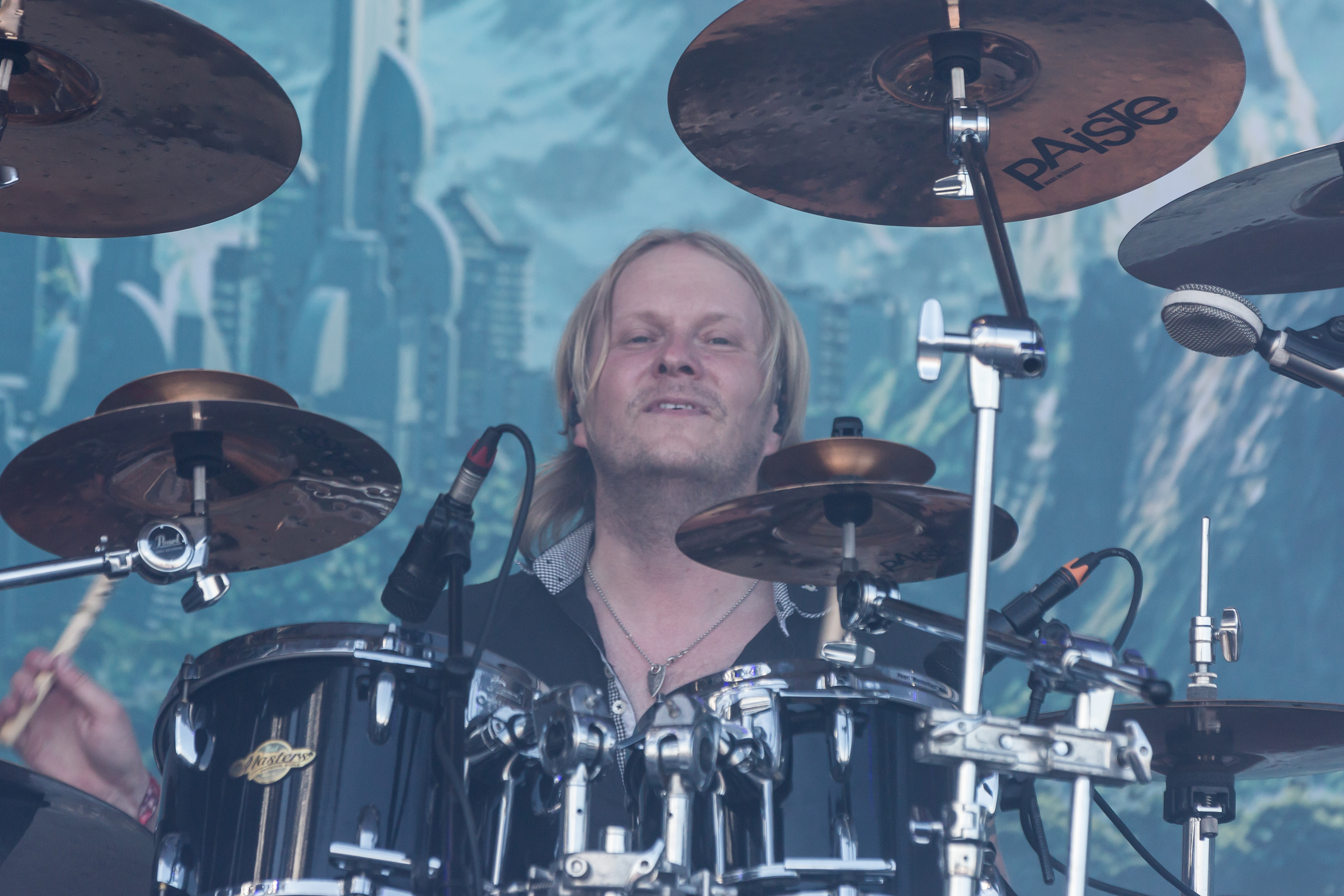
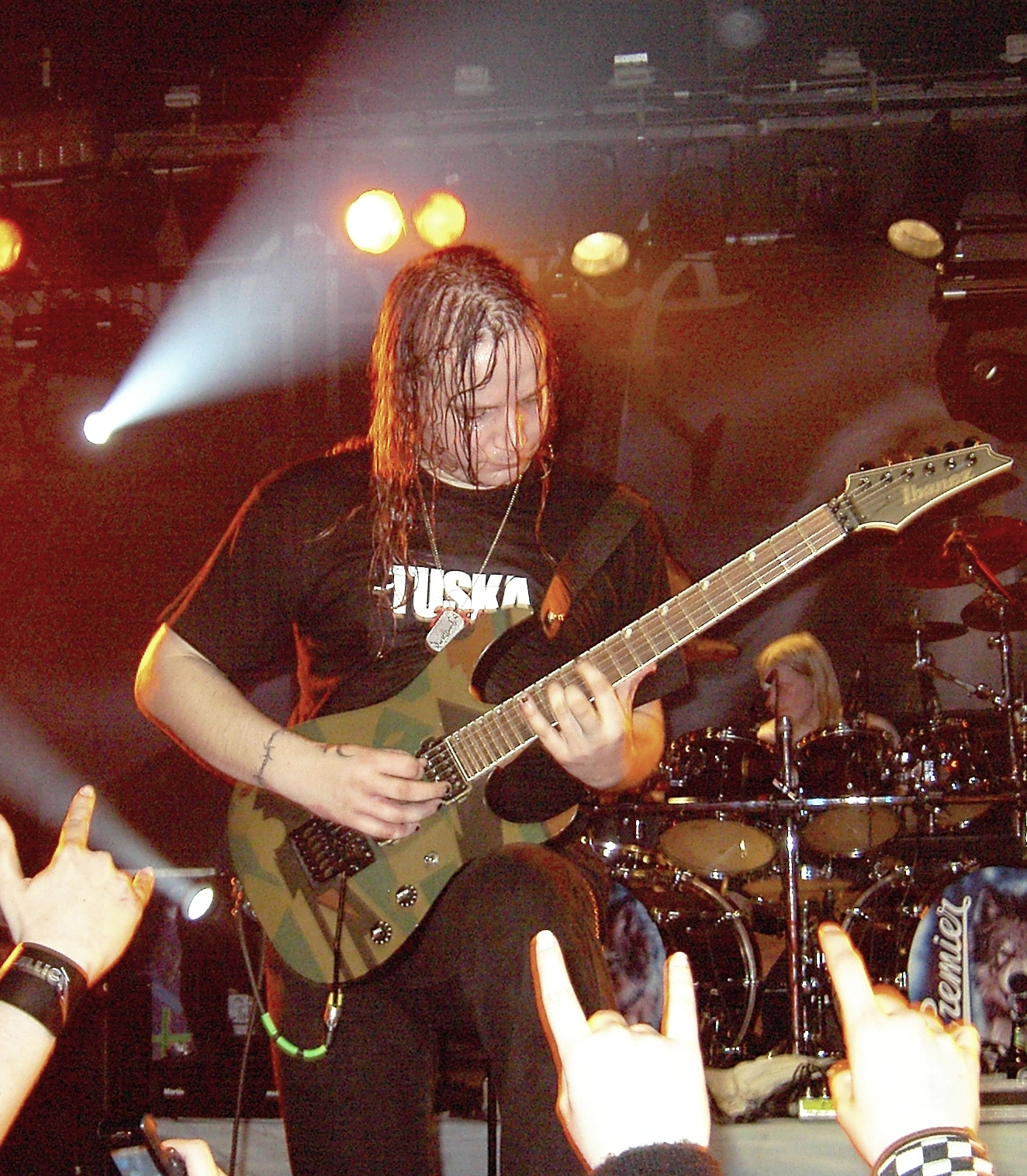
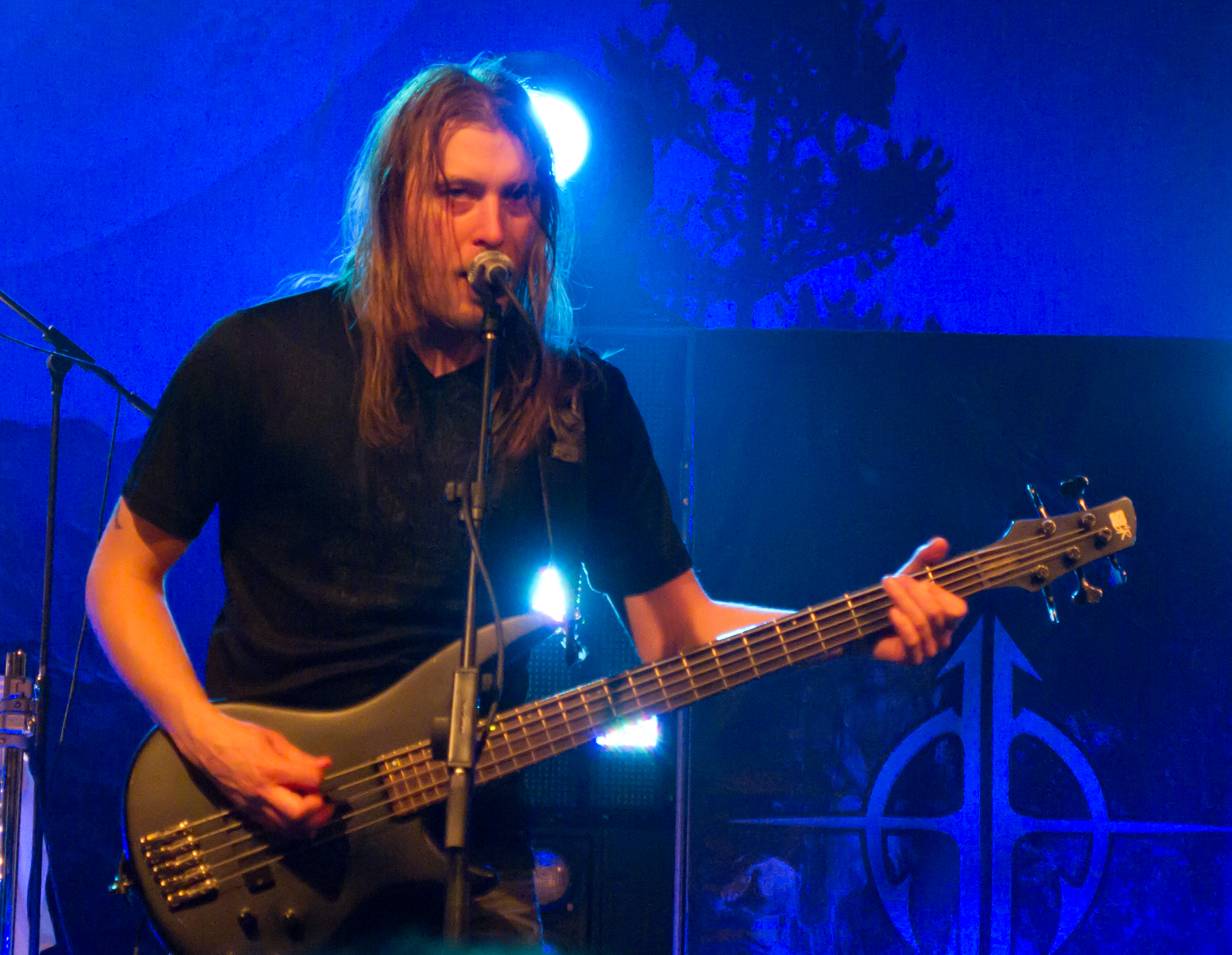
The founding members of Sonata Arctica: Tommy Portimo (left), Jani Liimatainen (center), Marko Paasikoski (right)

The band was founded by drummer Tommy Portimo and guitarists Jani Liimatainen and Marko Paasikoski in Kemi. At the end of 1995, lead vocalist Tony Kakko was added and bassist Pentti Peura joined in 1996. Originally named Tricky Beans, initially they played hard rock rather than the power metal with which they became famous. Kakko explained that when he was invited to join the band, Paasikoski said the band was going to play "a mixture of Megadeth and Spin Doctors". During their early career, they recorded three demos which were never sent to a recording label — Friend 'til the End, Agre Pamppers and PeaceMaker. According to Kakko, the band's first name was based on one of their early songs, which was "about a lady who was tricky and I didn't really know what I was talking about (laughs)". Their first show was about to take place but they were still unnamed, so they had to come up with something.

In 1997 the band changed their name to Tricky Means, and from that point until 1999 their style was thoroughly worked upon and ultimately was drastically changed, acquiring a strong emphasis on the keyboard melodies and relying on an easily distinguishable rhythm line maintained both by the bass and the guitar. Vocalist Tony Kakko developed a clean singing style which relies both on falsetto and tenor voices. Kakko has stated that the change of sound was influenced by fellow Finnish power metal band Stratovarius. At that time, Pentti Peura was fired and Marko Paasikoski left due to a lack of gigging. Two months later the band got signed to a three-album deal with Spinefarm, which left Marko displeased. The band finally changed their name to Sonata Arctica, because they thought they wouldn't be able to sell metal albums with the previous name and also because Spinefarm asked them to do so. "Sonata Arctica" was suggested by a friend of the band: "sonata" for the music and "arctica" for their home (Kemi, in Northern Finland).

In 1997, they recorded a demo entitled FullMoon in Kemi's Tico Tico Studios, which was their first real metal recording. The line-up consisted of Portimo, Liimatainen, Kakko and new bassist Janne Kivilahti (who started first as second guitarist). The demo was sent to Spinefarm Records by a friend of the band and a recording deal soon followed.

=== Ecliptica and Silence (1999–2002) ===
"Fullmoon" (1999)
Sample of "Fullmoon" from Ecliptica. This was one of the most popular songs on the album and is a long running setlist staple.

Later that year, Sonata Arctica's first single, entitled "UnOpened", was released in Finland. Soon after, the band had closed deals with labels from around the world, prior to the release of their debut album. The debut Ecliptica arrived by the end of 1999 and had a worldwide release. Tony Kakko then decided to focus on singing and the band began seeking a new keyboard player. Mikko Härkin (ex-Kenziner) was eventually invited to fill the position.

At the beginning of 2000, Sonata Arctica was chosen to support the well-known power metal band Stratovarius throughout their European tour. Marko Paasikoski returned to the band to play bass in the wake of Janne Kivilahti's departure after the tour. According to Kakko, Kivilahti left because he thought they weren't going anywhere and Paasikoski was their first choice as the new bassist since he left just before the band got their first record deal.

Throughout Winter 2000/2001, the band worked on composing and recording their next album — Silence — which was released in June 2001. An extensive tour followed, which included concerts throughout Europe (together with Gamma Ray) and Japan. In 2002 Sonata Arctica made its first incursion to America, putting on shows in Brazil and Chile. A live album entitled Songs of Silence was also released that year, consisting of gigs from their tour in Japan. By the end of 2002, Mikko Härkin left the band for personal reasons.

=== Winterheart's Guild and Reckoning Night (2003–2006) ===
In the search for another keyboardist, the band received many applications and two of them were invited for auditions. Since they were well aware of the candidates' ability, the band decided to pick the new member based on personality. To this end, they spent a night drinking with each of the potentials to find out which one would fit best into the band's personality and mentality. Henrik Klingenberg was eventually chosen and joined the band in time to take part in the tour that followed the release of Winterheart's Guild. With the end of their contract with Spinefarm Records, the band received invitations from most European recording labels and eventually opted for Nuclear Blast.

"Don't Say a Word" (2004)
Sample of "Don't Say a Word" from Reckoning Night. This album demonstrated their departure towards a more progressive sound.

Their third album — Winterheart's Guild was recorded with the help of the seasoned keyboard player Jens Johansson from Stratovarius who recorded the keyboard solos, while Kakko took care of the basics. The album was released in 2003.

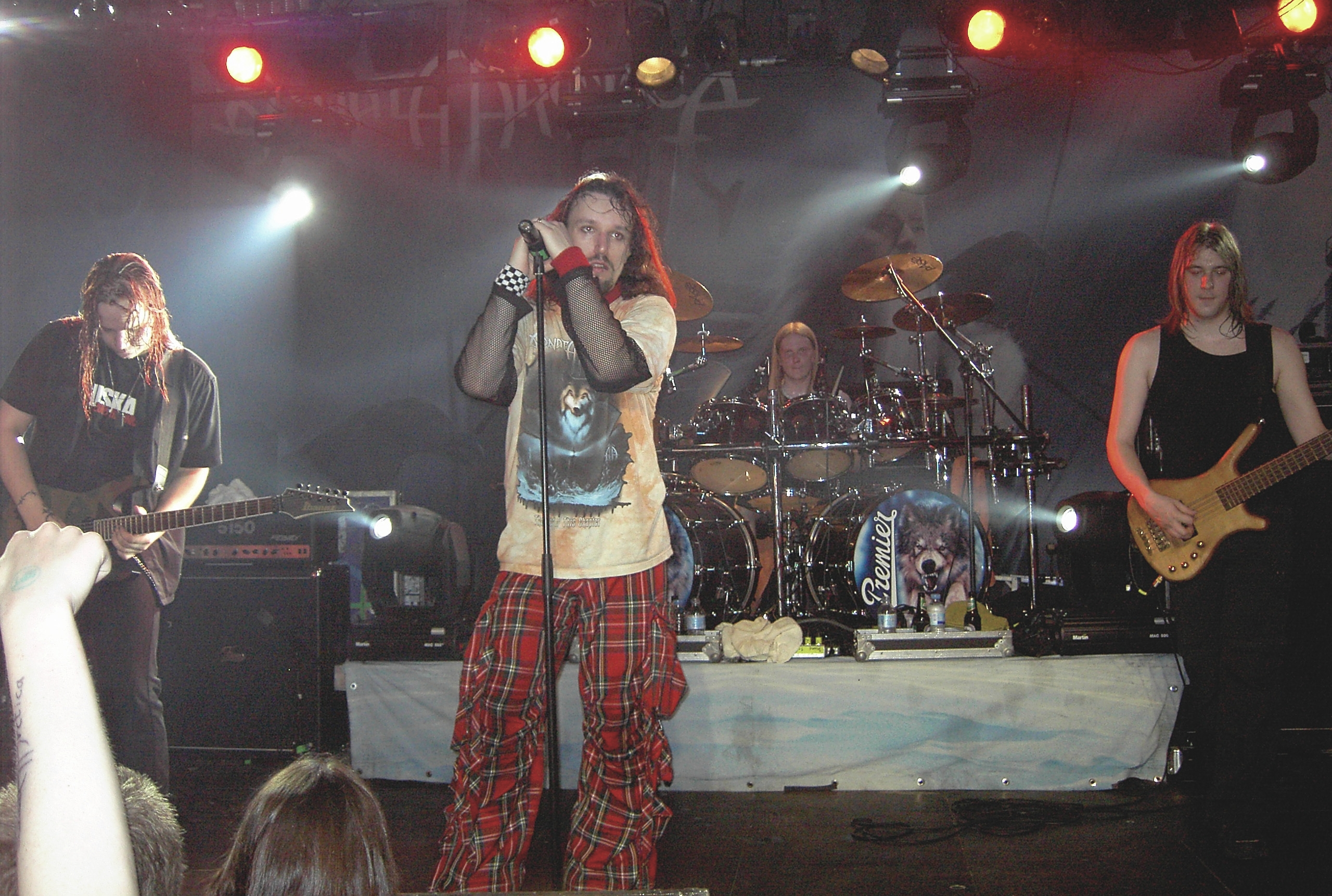
Sonata Arctica performing in Helmond, Netherlands, in April 2006

In early 2004, the band was chosen as the opener for Iron Maiden's Japanese tour. Additionally, Tommy Portimo became a father; his wife gave birth to a baby girl in March. Reckoning Night was recorded in three months and released in October, with Klingenberg introducing the use of the organ to the band. Both the single and the EP of this release remained on the top of the Finnish charts simultaneously for over six weeks. A promotional tour was to follow, but Sonata Arctica was invited by the popular Nightwish to join their European tour, and thus made a change of plans.

In early 2005, Nightwish invited the band to open the concerts of their North American tour. This tour eventually got cancelled, but the members of Sonata Arctica opted to still make a short tour, playing concerts in Canada and the United States. On 21 October 2005, Sonata Arctica opened for Nightwish at the Hartwall Areena, Helsinki.

In 2006, the band released a live CD and DVD entitled For the Sake of Revenge, which was recorded in Tokyo in February 2005. Then, Spinefarm Records released a compilation album to get the most out of their contract with the band, since Sonata Arctica had changed to another label. The compilation is entitled The End of This Chapter and was released in Japan in August 2005 and in Europe in May 2006.

A computer video game was also planned, based on Sonata Arctica characters and music. The name of the game was going to be Winterheart's Guild, after the album. The game was to be developed by Zelian Games, and was to be an Action-RPG in a style between Fallout and Diablo. The game was cancelled for unannounced reasons but a demo was shown at the Leipzig video game conference in 2006, featuring Henrik Klingenberg as the playable character. In December 2006, the band began recording their fifth studio album.

=== Unia and The Days of Grays (2007–2011) ===
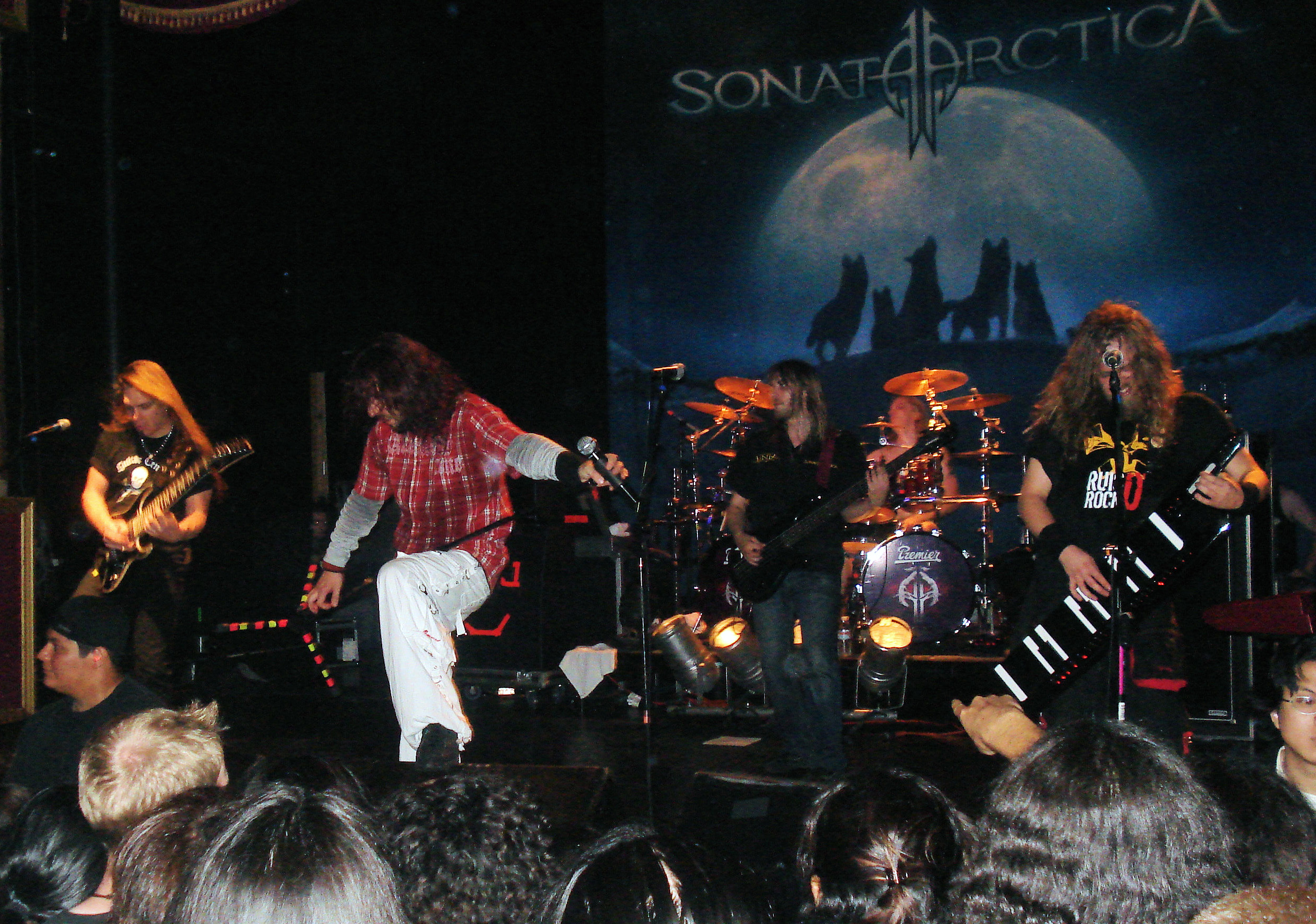
Sonata Arctica performing at the Galaxy Theatre in September 2007

On 25 May 2007, Unia was released. The album's first single, "Paid in Full", was released on 27 April 2007. On 6 August 2007, the band announced on their website that guitarist Jani Liimatainen had been asked to leave the band due to problems related to his conscription. He was replaced by Elias Viljanen who had already filled in for him in the band's Finnish and Japanese shows during the spring and summer.

In October 2007, Sonata Arctica headlined the ProgPower USA VIII. Later, the band supported Nightwish across their 2008 tour of the United States and Canada and headlined at the shows that Nightwish cancelled due to Anette Olzon's sudden severe sickness.

It was announced on 4 September 2008 that the band's first two albums would be re-released with bonus tracks by Spinefarm UK on October 6. The Days of Grays was released on September 16, 2009 in Finland and September 22 in the USA. Henrik stated that the new album would be in the same vein as Unia, but not as complex and darker. Singles from this album include "Flag in the Ground" and "The Last Amazing Grays". On 28 August 2009, the music video of "Flag in the Ground" was released to the web. The limited 2CD European edition of the album featured many of the album tracks with all instruments performed by a symphony orchestra.

The band also toured with DragonForce for the third U.S. leg of the Ultra Beatdown. In early 2010 they engaged on an Australian tour with Ensiferum and Melbourne band Vanishing Point. In April 2010, Sonata Arctica embarked on their USA and Canada Headlining tour for The Days of Grays. In October they headlined in Chile in support of the same album.

=== Stones Grow Her Name (2011–2013) ===
"Cinderblox" (2012)
Sample of "Cinderblox" from Stones Grow her Name. After orchestrally complex previous albums with Unia and Days of Grays, Sonata Arctica went for a somewhat simpler sound.

In January 2011, the band hinted in an online interview for Metaleater magazine that they were writing songs for a new album while on their current tour. Elias is quoted as saying, "I've been working on some new riffs, quite dark. Tony's been stuck in his bed scratching notes about some girl and her 'Luna Lust'." Tommy states later, "We've just got back from Cozumel, we had a good time, had lots of beers, loads more sun and thought about putting a bit more Queen stuff back into the music again." In April, the band recorded a live DVD in Oulu, Finland, entitled Live in Finland, which was released on 11 November 2011 (11/11/11).

It was announced on 20 February 2012 through the official Sonata Arctica website that the new album entitled Stones Grow Her Name would be released on 18 May in Europe and 22 May in North America.

The Album's first single and video "I Have A Right" was released on April 18, the second single from the album, "Shitload of Money" was released on September 14.

The Stones Grow Her Name World Tour began in April with summer festivals until August.

=== Pariah's Child, The Ninth Hour and Talviyö (2014–2023) ===
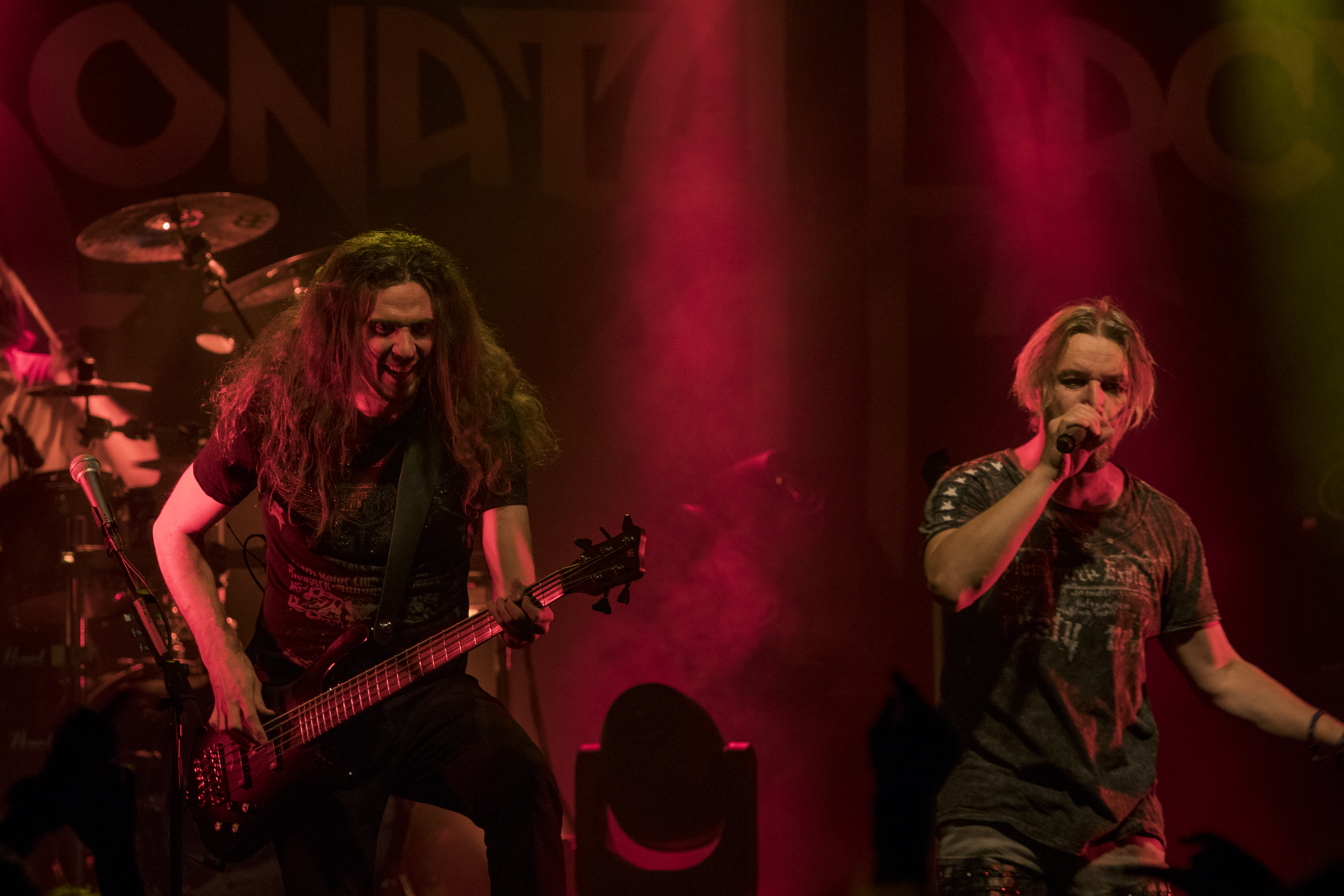
Pasi Kauppinen and Tony Kakko performing in 2019

In a June 2013 interview concerning Henrik Klingenberg's own band Silent Voices, Henrik confirmed Sonata Arctica would go into recording for their eighth studio album in September 2013. When pushed for more information, he assured jovially: "If it doesn't come out by next year, we're in big trouble!" Concerning the progress and style of this new album, he also mentioned "The bulk of the album, we already have the demos ..." as well as "we want to focus on making songs that work live."

During rehearsals, Henrik mentioned on his blog that songs they were rehearsing for the new album seemed to hearken towards Sonata Arctica's earlier days. He also mentioned their plan to record a 10-minute track for the new album.

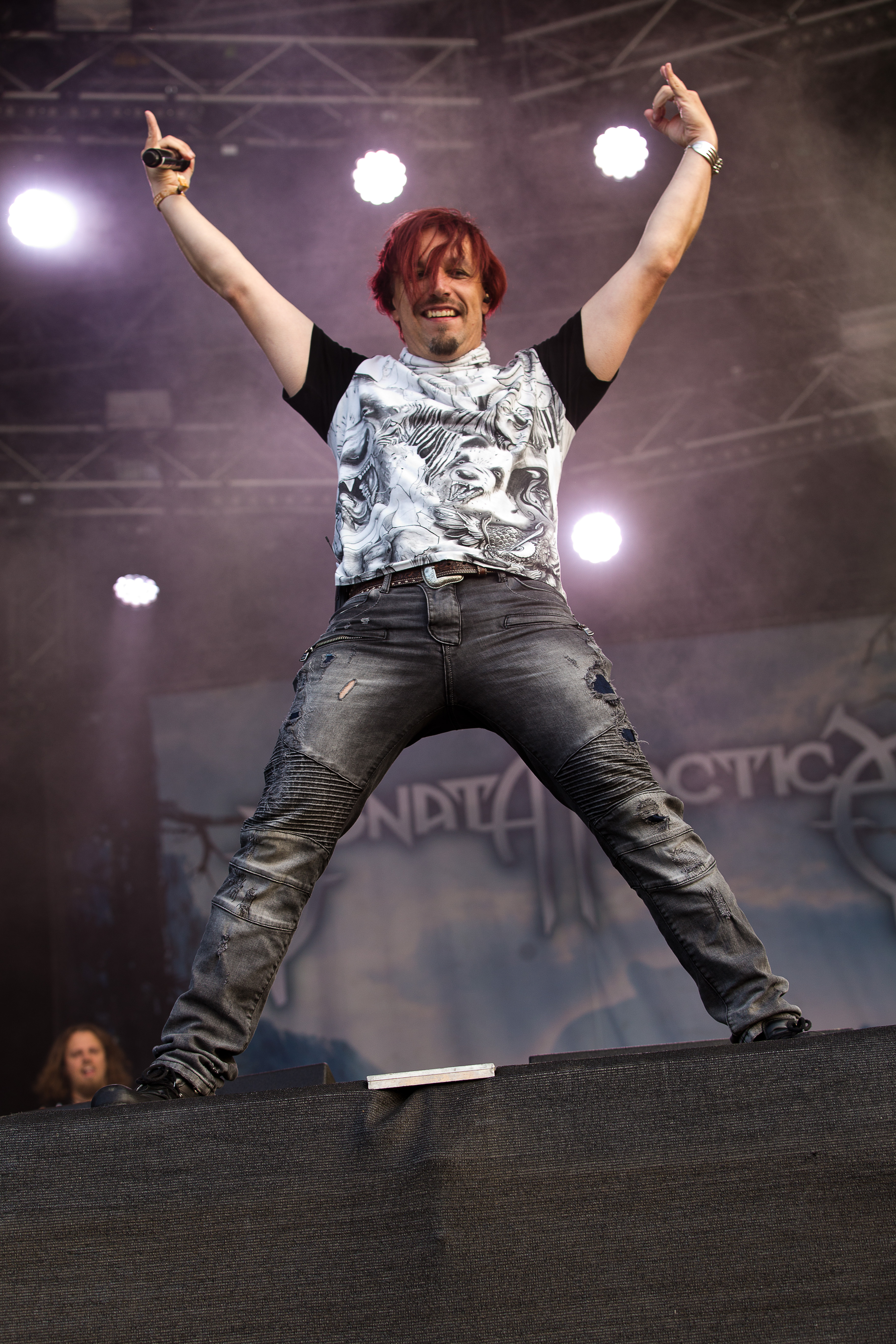
Tony Kakko at Rockharz festival 2016

On 26 August 2013 the band officially announced on their Facebook page that Marko Paasikoski had left the band due to unsolvable issues with being part of a touring ensemble, and was replaced by bassist Pasi Kauppinen. On January 9, 2014, the band officially announced via their official website that the band's next studio album, Pariah's Child, will be released on March 28, 2014.

Tony Kakko commented on the style of the new album as well as its album artwork upon the release announcement:

As the music on the album is bowing more towards the "old" Sonata, meaning more power metal style elements and wolves in many of the songs in one form or another, it was clear we need a wolf on the cover. An abandoned wolf. A pariah. Or Pariah's child, actually. The new generation to bring the old logo back.

In summer 2014, the band re-recorded their first album, Ecliptica. It was released in October 2014. Tony stated that the band was hoping to record the songs in a manner faithful to the original, not in a manner that would completely change the feel of their original album.

On 3 September 2014, Ouergh Records announced a Sonata Arctica tribute album. The album, A Tribute to Sonata Arctica featured bands from across the globe covering Sonata Arctica songs, with a focus on newer bands that were influenced by Sonata Arctica. Prominent bands included: Xandria, Van Canto, Stream of Passion, Arven, Powerglove, and Timeless Miracle. The album was endorsed by Tony Kakko. The tribute album was released September 12, 2015.

In 2014, writer Marko J. Ollila released a biography of the band, titled simply Sonata Arctica. The book was published by Paasilinna Publishing Ltd. and was originally only in Finnish. An English translation was published on 5 December 2014 as an e-book. The book covered the band's history from its formations up to the 2014 re-record of Ecliptica. It also included a fictional short-story written by Kakko, which was the singer's debut as a writer of material other than lyrics.

On 18 December 2015, Sonata Arctica released a Christmas-themed single, Christmas Spirits.

In February 2016, the band announced their plans to start recording a new album and release it in the final quarter of 2016. In July 2016, they announced on their Facebook page that the yet-to-be-titled album was mixed. On July 21, they officially announced the album's title, album artwork, and release date on their Facebook page. Their ninth studio album, The Ninth Hour, was released on October 7, 2016. The artwork featured a future Utopian landscape with technology and nature in the balance.

In November 2018, the band revealed that they were working on a new album, which its production had finished in 2019. On 21 June 2019 they released a lyric video for "A Little Less Understanding" and revealed the name of the tenth studio album Talviyö which was released via Nuclear Blast on 6 September 2019.

=== Clear Cold Beyond (2023–present) ===
The band released "First in Line", the first single from their eleventh studio album Clear Cold Beyond on 13 October 2023; the album was released on 8 March 2024.

In March 2026, Portimo posted on social media that the band's next album should be released in 2027.

== Musical style and influences ==
When asked if the band identified themselves with power metal, melodic metal or none of them, Kakko stated:

I always think that it's "Melodic Metal". That's is the easiest thing to me because melody is very important to me and we all think we sound something like metal so ... haha – Melodic Metal. They are all the same for me really ... there's so many names it's kind of confusing.

In a 2007 interview with C.B.Liddell, Tony Kakko cited the English rock band Queen as his biggest musical influence.

A lot of people seem to mention a Queen influence in our music... Queen has always been the biggest band for me.

He also cites Stratovarius' Visions.

== Band members ==
Current

- Tommy Portimo – drums (1995–present)
- Tony Kakko – lead vocals (1996–present), keyboards (1996–2000, 2003, 2007–present)
- Henrik Klingenberg – keyboards, keytar, backing vocals (2003–present)
- Elias Viljanen – guitars, backing vocals (2007–present)
- Pasi Kauppinen – bass, backing vocals (2013–present)

Former

- Jani Liimatainen – guitars, backing vocals (1995–2007), lead vocals, keyboards (1995–1996)
- Marko Paasikoski – bass (1995–1996, 2000–2013), guitar (1996–1997), backing vocals (1995–1997, 2000–2013)
- Pentti Peura – bass, backing vocals (1996–1998)
- Janne Kivilahti – bass, backing vocals (1998–2000)
- Mikko Härkin – keyboards, backing vocals (2000–2002)

== Discography ==
Studio albums

- Ecliptica (1999)
- Silence (2001)
- Winterheart's Guild (2003)
- Reckoning Night (2004)
- Unia (2007)
- The Days of Grays (2009)
- Stones Grow Her Name (2012)
- Pariah's Child (2014)
- The Ninth Hour (2016)
- Talviyö (2019)
- Clear Cold Beyond (2024)
