= Jani Liimatainen =

Finnish musician (born 1980)

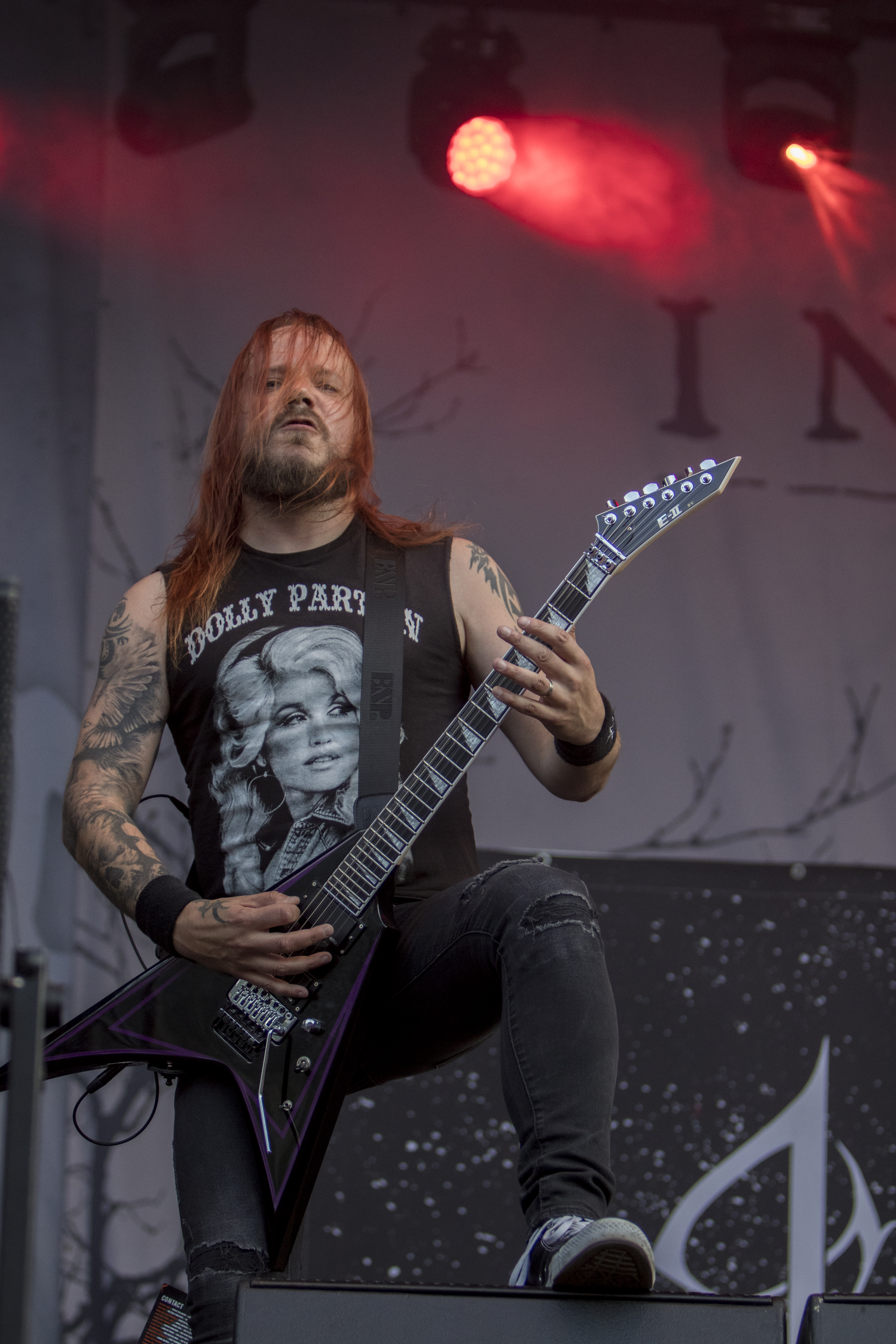
- Liimatainen performing with Insomnium at John Smith Rock Festival 2019

Background information
- Born: 9 September 1980 (age 45); Kemi, Finland
- Genres: Power metal, melodic death metal, symphonic metal
- Occupations: Musician, songwriter, producer
- Instruments: Guitar, keyboards
- Years active: 1996–present
- Member of: Cain's Offering; Dream Asylum; Sydänpuu
- Formerly of: Sonata Arctica; Altaria; Insomnium; The Dark Element

Jani Allan Kristian Liimatainen (born 9 September 1980) is a Finnish guitarist. He came to prominence as the guitarist for the power metal band Sonata Arctica between 1996 and 2007, and has since played in and founded bands such as Altaria, Cain's Offering, The Dark Element and Insomnium. Liimatainen's playing style is well known for his meticulous and fast soloing and riffs.

== Early life ==
Liimatainen started playing the guitar when he was around 12 years old. Later, he founded the band Tricky Beans together with young people from Kemi. The band adopted the name Sonata Arctica in 1999.

== Career ==
=== Sonata Arctica ===
Liimatainen was a founding member of Sonata Arctica and appeared on the band's studio albums Ecliptica, Silence, Winterheart's Guild, Reckoning Night and Unia and on the band's four EPs and two live albums between 1999 and 2007. Sonata Arctica's fourth studio album Reckoning Night contains the song "My Selene" composed and written by Liimatainen. Liimatainen was fired from Sonata Arctica due to conscription ambiguities in May 2007.

Along with Sonata Arctica, Liimatainen was a member of the Altaria band between 2001 and 2004. He can be heard on the band's Invitation and Divinity albums, of which Divinity has the songs "Unchain the Rain" and "Falling Again" composed and written by him. Liimatainen also played keyboards on both albums.

=== Cain's Offering and Timo Kotipelto ===
Nowadays, Liimatainen plays guitar in the band he founded Cain's Offering, whose first album Gather the Faithful was released in autumn 2009. The second album Stormcrow was released in May 2015. Liimatainen is the band's producer and main songwriter.

Liimatainen also gigs with Stratovarius and Cain's Offering singer Timo Kotipelto as the Kotipelto & Liimatainen duo. The duo released the acoustic cover album Blackoustic in October 2012. The album also contains one new song by Liimatainen, "Where My Rainbow Ends".

=== Other projects ===
Liimatainen has a band called Sydänpuu with drummer Risto Koskinen from Kemi, where he sings and plays guitar, bass and keyboards. The band was founded in 2004 and has released two singles and demos so far. The single "Malja" was released in 2013.

Liimatainen also works as Antti Railio's gig guitarist and played some of the guitars on Railio's Vieras maa album. Starting in 2015, Liimatainen worked occasionally as guitarist-singer Ville Friman's accompanist on Insomnium's tours. He later became an official member of the band Insomnium from July 2019 until February 2024.

In 2016, Liimatainen started collaborating with former Nightwish singer Anette Olzon, and the first album of the resulting The Dark Element project was released in November 2017.

Liimatainen was also in a band called Dream Asylum.

Liimatainen's solo album My Father's Son was released on 6 May 2022.

=== Songs for other bands ===
Liimatainen has composed the song "River Runs Dry" for the band Sturm und Drang.

Liimatainen wrote lyrics for most of the songs on Arion's debut album Last of Us.

The Stratovarius album Nemesis has two songs that Liimatainen contributed to the composition and lyrics of: "If the Story Is Over" and "Out of the Fog".

=== Guest appearances ===
In October 2007, Liimatainen played guitar in the backing band of Paul Di'Anno on the singer's Finnish tour.

He has also made a guest appearance on Celesty's Reign of Elements album on the song "Revenge" and on Human Temple's Insomnia album in the song "Animal".

== Other ==
In 2013–2014, Liimatainen studied songwriting at the Lappia conservatory.

Liimatainen writes a blog called Jani Hates You All. The name of the blog is a tribute to Hank Moody from the series Californication.
