= Henrik Klingenberg =

Finnish musician (born 1978)

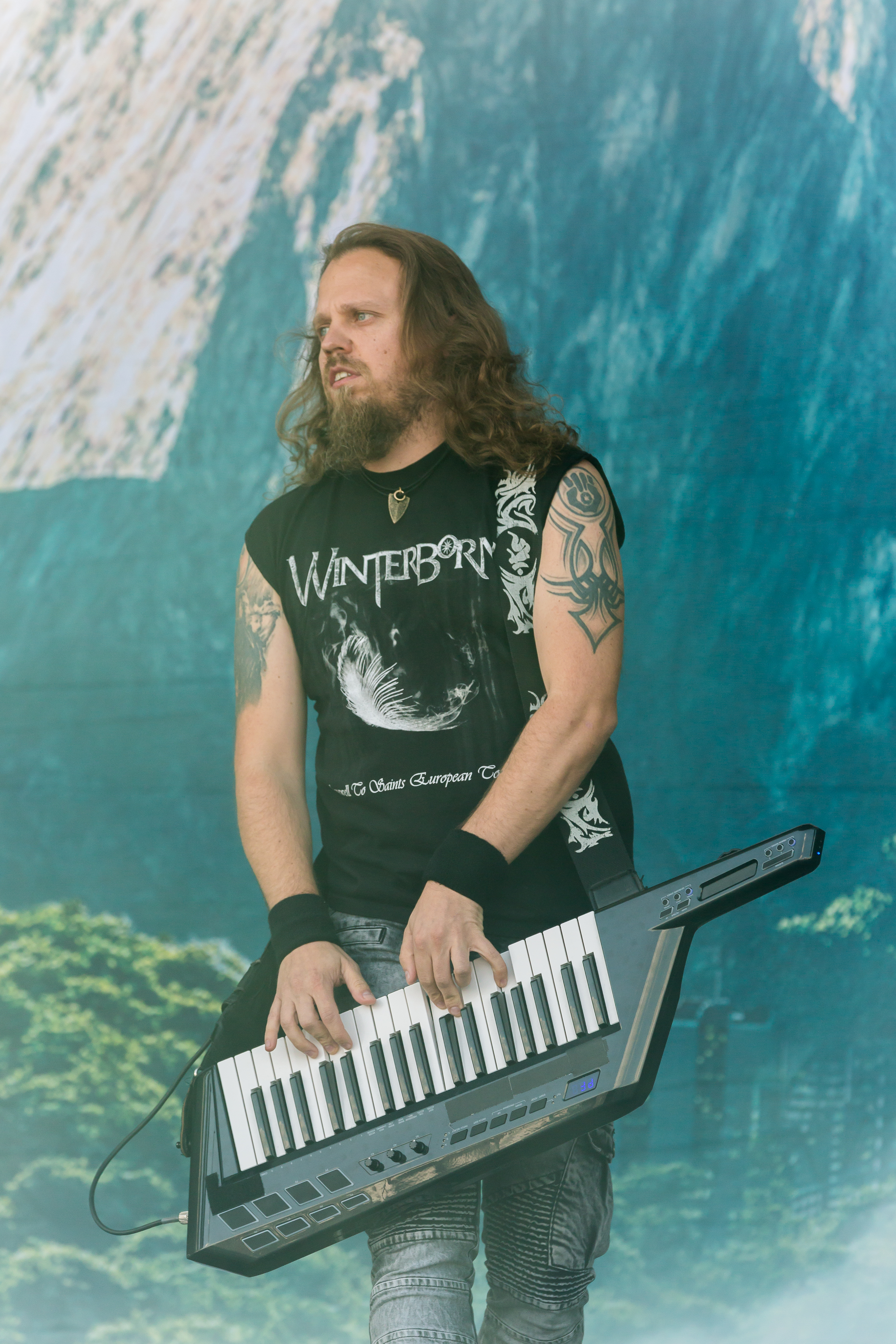
- Henrik Klingenberg in 2017

Background information
- Also known as: Henkka
- Born: 21 October 1978 (age 46); Mariehamn, Åland, Finland
- Origin: Kemi, Finland
- Genres: Power metal, progressive metal, melodic death metal, thrash metal, groove metal
- Occupation: Musician
- Instrument(s): Keyboards, keytar, vocals
- Years active: 1995–present
- Labels: Nuclear Blast
- Website: www.sonataarctica.info/site07/

Henrik "Henkka" Klingenberg (born 21 October 1978) is a Finnish keyboardist, keytarist and singer. He joined the Finnish power metal band Sonata Arctica in late 2002 and currently resides in Kemi, Finland, when not on tour.

Keyboardists he has listed as his favourites include Kevin Moore, Jon Lord, Jens Johansson and Matt Guillory. He claims that his musical inspiration is taken from life itself.

== Career ==
Although his main involvement is with Sonata Arctica, he is also a member of the band Silent Voices and a thrash/groove metal band called Mental Care Foundation (in which he is the vocalist rather than the keyboardist). He has also recently started a melodic death metal side project called Graveyard Shift as vocalist with his former Sonata Arctica bandmate Jani Liimatainen.

Before joining Sonata Arctica, he had participated in a large number of bands that he does not list on his bio page on the official Sonata Arctica website. His most well-known previous band was a progressive power metal band called Requiem, with whom he recorded two albums and contributed keyboards.

Henrik plays the keytar (formerly the Roland AX-1, then the Roland AX-7, then AX-1 again and now the Roland AX-Synth) and a Kurzweil, Korg KARMA or Korg Triton synthesizer. Recently he started to use Korg M3 instead of the Korg Karma. August 2009 in Lowlands his gear was just painted Roland AX-1 and Korg M3 and no racks. This seems to be his live gear from now on. He is endorsed by Korg and Roland (updated 16 September 2009) On a European leg of 2009 Henkka started using new Roland AX-Synth (painted violet) instead of his old AX-1 (updated 24 December 2009).

In February 2012 he released his first solo album, ...And the Weird Turned Pro, in which fellow Sonata Arctica bandmates Elias Viljanen and Pasi Kauppinen play the guitar and the bass, respectively (though Kauppinen was still not a member of the band). They are also joined by Finnish drummer Jari Huttunen.

== Personality ==
Sonata Arctica chose Klingenberg to join after spending time drinking with him and another candidate, since they wanted the newcomer to fit in with the other band members' socially as well as musically.

During live shows, Klingenberg's keytar allows him to add more energy and movement to the band's performances and he often wanders the stage whilst playing, in the same way that guitarists often do. On the Sonata Arctica live DVD For the Sake of Revenge, Klingenberg smashed his hand painted Roland AX-7 several times into the floor of the stage in an event that was referred to as 'The End of this Keyboard' (a reference to the band's song 'The End of this Chapter'). This act mirrored the instrument-destroying antics of The Who as well as being a cliché of rock and metal music and it showed Klingenberg to be a more traditional rock or metal performer.

In the documentary Men of the North in the Land of the Rising Sun, Klingenberg is shown wearing a traffic cone on his head, which has become a trademark of sorts for fans.
