= Tony Kakko =

Finnish musician (born 1975)

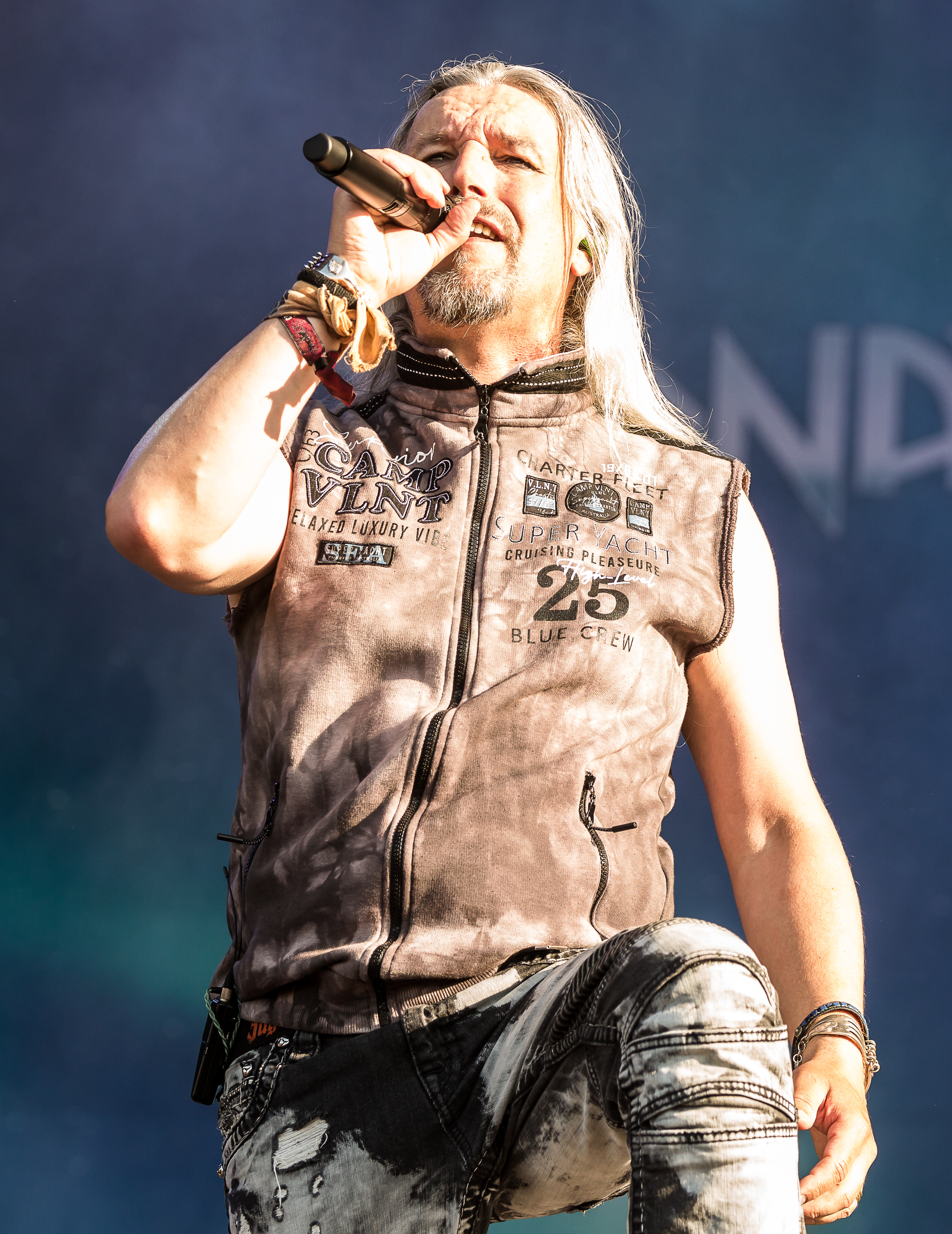
- Tony Kakko performing with Sonata Arctica in 2023

Background information
- Born: Toni Kristian Kakko; 16 May 1975 (age 51); Kemi, Finland
- Genre: Power metal
- Occupations: Musician, songwriter
- Instruments: Vocals, keyboard, acoustic guitar
- Years active: 1996–present
- Member of: Sonata Arctica; Northern Kings; Raskasta Joulua

Toni Kristian "Tony" Kakko (born 16 May 1975) is a Finnish musician, composer and vocalist. He is known as the vocalist, primary songwriter, and creative lead of the band Sonata Arctica since 1996.

== Biography ==
Kakko was born in Kemi, Finland and joined Sonata Arctica in 1996, after studying keyboards for two years and singing informally in local festivals. He initially performed both the keyboards and the vocals, but after the release of the band's first album, decided to concentrate on singing with the joining of Mikko Härkin. The metal bands, Stratovarius, Children of Bodom, Nightwish, Rhapsody of Fire and Helloween are amongst his biggest musical influences. Kakko also states the season of winter as one of his influences. His singing style is clean and generally high-pitched. He sings in the tenors range, and has begun to scream on later releases with Sonata, especially The Days of Grays, but also some screams in the background on Unia.

Kakko appeared as a guest male vocalist in Nightwish's 2001 remake of their song "Astral Romance", which appeared on the EP Over the Hills and Far Away. He also sang backing vocals on the song "Over the Hills and Far Away" and sang a duet with Tarja Turunen on the live version of "Beauty and the Beast." Kakko appears on stage with Tarja performing "Beauty and the Beast," on Nightwish's live DVD From Wishes to Eternity. He performed guest vocals in the song "Wasted Time" from Heavenly's album Virus and backing vocals for Before the Bleeding Sun, the fifth album of the Finnish band Eternal Tears of Sorrow, and Epica's song White Waters from the album Design Your Universe.

Since 2006, he has been involved in the metal music project Raskasta Joulua from Finland which records and performs Christmas carols in concerts. More recently, he has been involved with a project Northern Kings, in which he, along with Juha-Pekka Leppäluoto (Charon), Marko Hietala (Tarot, Nightwish) and Jarkko Ahola (Teräsbetoni) sings covers of classics from decades past.

In July 2015, it was announced that Kakko would replace Jukka Nevalainen as Nightwish's special guest at the 2015 edition of Rock in Rio.

In December 2018, Kakko was awarded with the title of Knight of The Order of The Lion of Finland.

== Selected discography ==
=== Northern Kings ===
- Reborn – 2007
- Rethroned – 2008

=== Guest appearances ===
- Nightwish – Over the Hills and Far Away – 2001
- Nightwish – From Wishes to Eternity (DVD) – 2001
- Heavenly – Virus – 2006
- Eternal Tears of Sorrow – Before the Bleeding Sun – 2006
- Nuclear Blast All-Stars: Into the Light – 2007
- Apocalyptica – Live Vocalist (Finland and Japan) – 2008, 2009
- Elias Viljanen – Fire-Hearted – 2009
- Stratovarius – Polaris – 2009
- Epica – Design Your Universe – 2009
- Van Canto – "Hearted", on Tribe of Force – 2010
- Powerglove – Saturday Morning Apocalypse – 2010
- Devil Down - Skylight - 2011
- Avalon – "We Will Find a Way", on The Land of New Hope – 2013
- Tuomas Holopainen – Music Inspired by the Life and Times of Scrooge – 2014
- Vanishing point – Circle of fire on Distant is the sun – 2014
- Dark Sarah – "Light in You" on Behind The Black Veil – 2015
- Hevisaurus – "100" – 2019
- Lordi – "Rollercoaster" on Lordiversity – 2021
- Ancestry Darkest Day on Transitions -2021
- Jani Liimatainen – "All Dreams Are Born to Die " on "My Father’s Son" – 2022
