= Dead End (band) =

Japanese heavy metal/hard rock band

- Dead End circa late 1987, from left to right: Minato, Joe, Morrie, You.

Background information
- Origin: Tokyo, Japan
- Genres: Heavy metal; hard rock
- Years active: 1984–1990; 2009–2015; 2026
- Labels: Night Gallery; Victor Invitation; BMG Victor; Danger Crue; Motorod; Metal Blade (NA)
- Past members: Motoyuki "Morrie" Ōtsuka; Tadashi "Crazy Cool Joe" Masumoto; Takahiro Kagawa; Masaaki Tano; Yuji "You" Adachi; Masafumi Minato
- Website: dead-end.jp

Dead End (stylized as DEAD END) was a Japanese heavy metal/hard rock band formed in Tokyo in late 1984. Following the release of their debut album Dead Line in 1986, the classic lineup of vocalist Morrie, bassist Crazy Cool Joe, guitarist You and drummer Minato was solidified in May 1987. They released three more studio albums and were one of few Japanese metal bands to have international exposure in the United States during the eighties, before dissolving in 1990.

Dead End reunited in 2009 after almost two decades and released the album Metamorphosis. Although he recorded the drums for the album, Minato declined to participate in the reunion beyond that. The remaining three members of the band continued to tour and record until 2015. Main composer You died unexpectedly in June 2020. Morrie and Joe performed a one-off concert as Dead End in 2026.

Although they achieved only limited commercial success in their homeland, Dead End had a significant impact on its rock scene, influencing numerous musicians in, or related to, the developing visual kei scene in the 1990s. Specifically, Morrie who inspired the visual appearance and rough vocal style of many prominent singers.

== History ==
=== 1984–1990: Formation to disbandment ===
"The name Dead End to us implied that we will be the last of something. Nothing like us would come after us, really the end, definitive."

— Morrie, on the band's name.

Dead End was formed in December 1984 by singer Morrie and guitarist Takahiro, both previously in the band Liar, bassist Crazy Cool Joe coming from the band Rajas, and drummer Tano from Terra Rosa. They had their first show in March 1985, at the Osaka Bourbon House in front of almost 500 people.

In 1986, they went on a nationwide tour called Dademonium Break Tour '86 Vol.1, after which guitarist Takahiro left and was replaced by You from Terra Rosa. In June they released their first records, the singles "Replica" and "Worst Song" on the independent label Night Gallery. Followed by their debut album Dead Line on June 30, which sold 20,000 copies, a rare achievement for a "house" band not yet signed to a major label. To commemorate the release of the album, the band played the Osaka Bourbon House again, and this time had a crowd of 800 people.

In 1987, drummer Tano left the band due to poor health, just before Dead End signed to major label Victor Invitation. He was replaced by Masafumi Minato from Saber Tiger after an audition held in May, completing the "classic" lineup that remained until their disbandment. On September 8 the band released their most successful album Ghost of Romance, which reached No.14 on the Oricon chart. At the end of the year Dead End signed with the American label Metal Blade Records for releases of Ghost of Romance and their next album. Ghost of Romance was released in December, and although it didn't enter the charts, it received a very good review in Kerrang! magazine.

On May 21, 1988 Dead End released their third album Shambara, followed by their first major single "Blue Vices" in December. That same month Psychoscape, a live video recording from their concert on September 24 at Shibuya Public Hall, was released. Shambara was released in the United States on September 1, and like the previous album it did not chart but received good reviews. Though music videos of "Danse Macabre" and "Blue Vices" were airing on MTV's Headbangers Ball television program, and their songs had decent airplay on rock radio stations, Morrie notes that "it just happened" and he "was not conscious of the US at that time."

The year 1989 started off with the band signing to major label BMG Victor, and they soon went to London, England to write songs and record video material until May. At this time their style changed, with the music being softer than their previous releases. On July 9 they held a concert in Shinjuku called Standing Convention Gig, where many new songs were played, that same month their second major single "So Sweet So Lonely" was released . On September 21 they released their fourth album Zero, in October they went on a live club tour and in mid-November a concert hall tour. It was this year when they started getting major exposure and promotion on TV. At the year's end they released their second live video Hyperd., which was recorded at their concert at Hibiya Open-Air Concert Hall.

After a concert at Nakano Sun Plaza on January 21, 1990, Minato left the band. Morrie and You then both began work on solo albums, but there was never any official announcement of Dead End disbanding. On April 21, the non-album single "Good Morning Satellite" was released, and on July 21 a self-titled live album recorded at their last concert was released.

=== 2009–2020: Reunion and You's death ===
On July 3, 2009, after almost 20 years, Morrie, Joe, You and Minato announced they would reunite as Dead End on August 15 at Jack in the Box 2009 Summer at Makuhari Messe. Morrie said the idea of a reunion first came to him when he asked his former bandmates to perform on Light & Lust, the 2006 album by his solo project Creature Creature. On October 1, a new Dead End album titled Metamorphosis was announced for release on November 11 by Danger Crue Records. Also released was a remastered release of Dead Line (also available in a limited edition including a DVD from a concert in January 1987 at Osaka Manichi Hall), SHM-CD releases of Ghost of Romance and Shambara, and reissues of Zero and Dead End on Blu-spec CDs in December, all with bonus tracks. They went on to perform sold-out concerts on November 17 at Osaka Big Cat and November 20 at Shibuya-AX, which Minato chose not to participate in. He later ceased to take part in the reunion altogether, with Shinya Yamada (Luna Sea) being support drummer before Kei Yamazaki (Venomstrip) took over the role.

On March 20, 2010, Dead End performed on the second day of the Rock May Kan venue's 30 anniversary concert Legend of Rock May Kan at JCB Hall, along with D'erlanger and 44 Magnum. Two days later, they performed at the concert Third Devour at Namba Hatch in Osaka, the third in a concert series called Four Wizards Night-Crawling, joined by Gastunk, Pay Money to My Pain and Cocobat. In August, they performed at Rock in Japan Festival 2010 in Hitachi Seaside Park and Jack in the Box Summer 2010.

In 2011, from January 22 to February 8 Dead End supported Acid Black Cherry on a Zepp tour. On August 8 they hosted a charity concert titled Fourth Devour at Shibuya O-East, where Pay Money to My Pain, Lynch. and Dead End themselves performed. All proceeds were donated to the victims of the 2011 Tōhoku earthquake and tsunami. In October they held a three-date tour called Death Ace 2011, with the final concert at Shibuya O-West on October 13 being broadcast live worldwide via Ustream. On October 23, they performed at the V-Rock Festival '11 held at Saitama Super Arena. On November 9, Dead End released their first single in over twenty years, "Conception", the first in a three-month series of consecutive releases. The second "Final Feast" was released on December 14, with the third "Yume Oni Uta" out on January 11, 2012. On the day of the third single's release, Dead End announced that their sixth studio album Dream Demon Analyzer would be released in March, and that the band will go on a nationwide tour, which ended on May 2 at Akasaka Blitz. Yamazaki performed drums on the record. On September 16, the band held a concert titled Kaosmoscape at Shibuya Public Hall to celebrate the 25th anniversary of their major label debut. A live video recording of the concert was released on December 12, 2012.

A tribute album to the band, titled Dead End Tribute - Song of Lunatics -, was released on September 4, 2013. It features many well-known artists, including Kiyoharu and Hitoki of Kuroyume, Hyde and Tetsuya of L'Arc-en-Ciel, Sugizo, Ryuichi and Shinya of Luna Sea, Yasu with Janne Da Arc members, Baki of Gastunk, Marty Friedman, members from Dir En Grey, La'cryma Christi, Versailles, Boris and many more. The album charted well, reaching No. 10 on Billboard Japan and No. 11 on Oricon. In 2014, Dead End performed abroad for the first time at Japan Music Fest on July 6 at the Olympia in Paris, France. The following year, they performed at the first night of Luna Sea's Lunatic Fest on June 28, 2015 and went on their own Witch Hunt Tour 2015.

Inactive for a few years, Morrie said that Dead End activities depended on You, and the guitarist admitted in 2019 that this was the case. In March 2019, You said that he wanted to make an acoustic solo album before working on Dead End. When this album was released in March 2020, You stated that Dead End would restart, and that he would be spending the next three months writing songs for the band. However, Dead End announced on June 19, 2020 that You had died from sepsis on June 16, aged 56.

=== 2020–present ===
Dead End's song "So Sweet So Lonely" was covered by Sugizo on his 2020 album Love & Tranquility as a tribute to You. Morrie held a concert in You's memory on the first anniversary of his death, where the singer reminisced and talked about his former bandmate in addition to performing. A memorial concert for You was also held at Spotify O-East on June 16, 2022, and included a "Dead End Session" featuring Morrie, Sugizo, Hiro and Sakito on guitars, Fire on bass, and Takeo Shimoda on drums. On September 7, 2022, Morrie released Ballad D, a "self-cover" album of Dead End songs, featuring Sugizo, Sakito and Heather Paauwe, that was also dedicated to You. For Morrie's 60th birthday event, Flesh Fate Festival at Ex Theater Roppongi on March 2, 2024, Morrie, Joe and Minato performed Dead End songs while cycling through Hiro, Sakito and Sugizo on guitar, and also featuring Sakura on additional percussion for two tracks.

Although Minato performs with Joe in the band D runkard Ball, and supports Morrie in Godland, in 2023, Joe and Morrie both expressed doubt on Dead End having any future activity. However, the two performed together as Dead End for an event at Spotify O-East on June 16, 2026. They were supported by former The Dead Pop Stars guitarist Taiji Fujimoto and The Yellow Monkey drummer Eiji Kikuchi. The other performing acts at the event were Cali Gari, Nightmare and The Legend of Rose.

== Music style ==
"Danse Macabre"
A hard rock song from the album
Ghost of Romance.

"Serafine"
A song from the album Zero, showing a softer sound.

Dead End, both in local and in Western media, was seen as a non-typical metal band whose music is hard to categorize. AllMusic author Eduardo Rivadavia, wrote that they're a "prototypical Japanese melodic heavy metal band", while in the '80s Kerrang! magazine review on Shambara, their music was described as similar to those of the English rock bands The Mission and The Cult, whose music takes cues from hard rock, gothic rock, and post-punk. In the same review, Morrie's vocal style was described as an intermediate between Graham Bonnet and Wayne Hussey. Also in the year before their disbandment Dead End's style changed, with the music being softer in sound and with more mass appeal than their previous releases. Contrary to the media, Morrie does not think of Dead End as a metal band. On the question "If there was one single song that best showcases the soul of Dead End" You said he is fond of some songs, but does not think there is a song that showcases Dead End, while for Morrie it is "Song of a Lunatic", that "is a look into the abyss, the back of my head."

The majority of the band's catalog of music is written by You, followed by Morrie, and then Takahiro, who wrote seven of eight songs on the first album. Morrie is responsible for all the lyrics, which are mostly in Japanese with some English lines (aside English-only "Night Song" and "I Can Hear the Rain"), and contributed three songs on the second, and four (two with the band's producer Hajime Okano) on the fourth album. Joe composed one song in each of the first three albums, and they all showcase the bass. The band usually does not discuss their ideas on sound and style, yet Morrie says, "we individually do what we want to do based on the songs that You creates, even if it destroys the original concept of the song." In regard to band's music and lyrics, Morrie described them as explosive and outward with an incentive kind of a death drive ("Thanatos"), but also "Eros".

=== Influence ===
Morrie's way of singing in the early years of Dead End was influenced by Ronnie James Dio, from whom he "learned how to crush the treble pitches", and by Baki of Gastunk, "who influenced him to establish his own style", leading to a combination of clean and distorted vocals. However, he claims his present way of singing and vocal approach is quite different now.

Dead End's music and music skills, lyrics, vocals and visual appearance at the time had a significant impact on the Japanese rock scene, influencing numerous musicians in, or related to, the developing visual kei scene in the late 1980s as well as 1990s. According to Japanese rock journalist, Yuichi Masuda, they thoroughly changed Japanese rock music which bands wouldn't be the same without them, and Dead End's success can be seen in their extraordinary influence on commercially successful successors. However, as Kiyoharu recalls, although the artists were aware of the influence, others in the audience and media mostly weren't until much later while the music industry was hiding it, giving credit for originality to newer bands for sake of better earning. As far back as 1991, Morrie was worried about rising imitation among Japanese rock bands.

The musicians who openly acknowledged the influence includes; Sugizo and Shinya from Luna Sea, Tetsuya and Sakura from L'Arc-en-Ciel, the latter being a roadie for them in the late 1980s, Hiro from La'cryma Christi, Yuana from Kagerou, Hitoki from Kuroyume, and Rikiji (Oblivion Dust) among others. Morrie also inspired the visual appearances and rough vocal styles of Ryuichi from Luna Sea, Hyde from L'Arc-en-Ciel, Yasu from Janne Da Arc and Acid Black Cherry, Kiyoharu from Kuroyume, and Aki from Laputa. Dead End went on to inspire modern bands such as Esprit D'Air, who released a cover of "Serafine" as a single in 2018. Additionally, Yoshiki from X Japan in the 1990s expressed fondness for the style of Dead End's drummer Minato.

== Members ==
Former members

- Motoyuki "Morrie" Ōtsuka (大塚基之) – vocals (1984–1990, 2009–2020, 2026; The Wild, Liar, Creature Creature)
- Tadashi "Crazy Cool Joe" Masumoto (増本正志) – bass, backing vocals (1984–1990, 2009–2020, 2026; Rajas)
- Takahiro Kagawa (香川孝博) – guitar (1984–1986; Liar, The Willard)
- Masaaki Tano (田野勝啓) – drums (1984–1987; Terra Rosa)
- Yuji "You" Adachi (足立祐二) – guitar (1986–1990, 2009–2020; his death, Jesus, Terra Rosa, Goatcore)
- Masafumi Minato (湊雅史) – drums (1987–1990, 2009; Saber Tiger)

Live support members

- Shinya Yamada (山田真矢) – drums (2009, Luna Sea)
- Kei Yamazaki (山崎慶) – drums (2010–2014, Venomstrip)
- Takeo Shimoda (下田武男) – drums (2015, Nuovo Immigrato)
- Taiji Fujimoto (藤本泰司) – guitar (2026, Judy and Mary, The Dead Pop Stars)
- Eiji Kikuchi (菊地英二) – drums (2026, The Yellow Monkey)

== Discography ==
Studio albums

- Dead Line (June 30, 1986) Night Gallery
  - Remastered release (November 11, 2009) No. 24 Danger Crue
- Ghost of Romance (September 8, 1987) No. 14 Victor Invitation
  - Remastered release (November 11, 2009) No. 77
- Shámbara (May 21, 1988) No. 29 Victor Invitation
  - Remastered release (November 11, 2009) No. 79
- Zero (September 21, 1989) No. 21 BMG Victor
  - Remastered release (December 23, 2009) No. 152 Ariola Japan
- Metamorphosis (November 11, 2009) No. 14 Danger Crue
- Dream Demon Analyzer (March 7, 2012) No. 23 Billboard Japan Top Albums No. 17 Motorod

Singles

- "Replica" (June 19, 1986; distributed for free at Osaka Bourbon House gig) Night Gallery
- "Worst Song" (June 1986)
- "Grave of the Shadow" (September 1987; Promo)
- "Replica/Worst Song" (February 1988; Limited)
- "Junk" (1988; US Promo) Metal Blade Records
- "Blue Vices" c/w "Wire Dancer" (December 16, 1988) Victor Invitation
- "So Sweet So Lonely" c/w "I'm in a Coma" (July 21, 1989) BMG Victor
- "I Want Your Love/So Sweet So Lonely" (1989; Promo)
- "Good Morning Satellite" c/w "Genshi no Kakera" (April 21, 1990) Oricon ranking: No. 75 BMG Victor
- "Conception" (November 9, 2011) Oricon: 37# Billboard Japan Hot Singles Sales No. 32 Motorod
- "Final Feast" (December 14, 2011) Oricon: 39# Billboard Japan Hot Singles Sales No. 34 Motorod
- "Yume Oni Uta" (January 11, 2012) Oricon: 36# Billboard Japan Hot Singles Sales No. 32 Motorod

Live albums

- Dead End (July 21, 1990) No. 54 BMG Victor
  - Remastered release (December 23, 2009) No. 253
- Dead End ~Live Act I~ (May 24, 1995) BMG Victor
- Dead End ~Live Act II~ (May 24, 1995) BMG Victor

Compilation albums

- All in One (June 21, 1997) BMG Victor
- Infinity ∞ (January 26, 2005) No. 198 BMG Victor

Tribute album

- Dead End Tribute - Song of Lunatics - (September 4, 2013) No. 11 Billboard Japan Top Albums No. 10 Motorod

Home videos

- Psychoscape (1988 VHS; September 22, 2004 DVD) No. 270 Victor Invitation
- Hyperd. (1989 VHS; May 23, 2001 DVD) BMG Victor
- Meguro Rockmaykan Live 1988.01 (2005 DVD included with Infinity ∞)
- Mainichi Hall Live 1987.01.11 (2009 DVD included in the re-release of Dead Line)
- Death Ace 2011 Live at Shibuya O-West (2012 DVD included with the limited edition of Dream Demon Analyzer)
- Dead End 25th Anniversary Live Kaosmoscape at Shibuya Public Hall 2012.09.16 (December 12, 2012 DVD and Blu-ray) No. 54 Motorod

Music videos

- "Danse Macabre" (1987)
- "Blue Vices" (1988)
- "So Sweet So Lonely" (1989)
- "Serafine" (1989)
- "Good Morning Satellite" (1990)
- "Princess" (2009)
- "Conception" (2011)
- "Final Feast" (2011)
- "Yume Oni Uta" (2012)

Various artists compilations

- Shoot the Guitarist (May 2, 1990)
  - Soundtrack to the film Fūsen. Includes instrumental versions of "Good Morning Satellite" and "Genshi no Karera".
