= Atom on Sphere =

- Origin: Tokyo, Japan
- Genres: Electronica; alternative dance; trip hop; big beat; synthpop
- Years active: 2011–present
- Label: Nayutawave Records (UMG) 2011–present
- Members: Ken Lloyd; Shigeo; Makoto Sakurai; Keitaimo

Atom on Sphere is a Japanese supergroup formed in 2011, combining rock and electronic music. They first performed as a special guest at an event organized and headlined by guitarist Shigeo's band The Samos on October 8, 2011 at Shibuya WWW. Their eponymous debut album was released on December 21, 2011, and performed live at an all-night record release party at Daikanyama Unit in Tokyo on December 23, 2011. All lyrics are in English.

== Members ==
- Ken Lloyd (Fake?, Oblivion Dust) – vocals
- Shigeo (The Samos, ex. SBK) – guitar, programming, backing vocals
- Makoto Sakurai (桜井 誠) (Dragon Ash) – drums, backing vocals
- Keitaimo (ケイタイモ; real name Keita Tanabe (田辺 啓太, Tanabe Keita)) (ex. Beat Crusaders) – bass, backing vocals

== Discography ==
Albums

- Atom on Sphere (21 December 2011, Nayutawave Records)
- The Secret Life of Mine (16 April 2019, INNOVATOR RECORDS)
