= Zero (Dead End album) =

Studio album by Dead End
- Released: September 21, 1989
- Recorded: May to July 1989 in London
- Genre: Heavy metal; hard rock
- Length: 59:37
- Label: BMG Victor (1989); Ariola Japan (2009)
- Producer: Hajime Okano

Dead End chronology
Shambara (1988)	Zero (1989)	Metamorphosis (2009)

Singles from Zero
- 1. "So Sweet So Lonely" Released: July 21, 1989; 2. "Good Morning Satellite" Released: April 21, 1989

Zero is the fourth studio album by Japanese metal band Dead End, released on September 21, 1989, in Japan by BMG Victor.

On December 23, 2009, it was remastered and re-released as Zero +2 with two bonus tracks, "Good Morning Satellite" and "Genshi no Karera", by Ariola Japan. "Good Morning Satellite" was used as soundtrack for the 1990 film Fuusen (ふうせん).

== Overview ==
Dead End released their first single on a major label, "Blue Vices", in September 1998. This was their first and last release on Victor Entertainment, as the band then transferred to BMG and released the single "So Sweet So Lonely" on July 21, 1989.

The group traveled to London in May 1989 to record the album, co-produced with Hajime Okano. Zero also featured the musical engineering of Steve Parker. They finished recording the album and a music video for "So Sweet So Lonely" in July, and returned to Japan.

Zero was released on September 21, 1989, and the following month, promotional tours for the album began. After a performance at Nakano Sun Plaza in January of the following year, Minato unexpectedly announced that he was leaving the band. After that, Morrie and You began working on their solo careers, and fans began to speculate that the band had broken up. Later, the rumors were confirmed.

== Legacy ==
Zero was a major influence on L'Arc-en-Ciel's debut album, Dune (1993).

The notable track "Serafine", being band's favorite and although not being a single was produced a music video, received several covers; Ryuichi Kawamura of Luna Sea covered it for Evergreen ~Anniversary Edition~ (2007), Arika Takarano, Sugizo, Tokie and Keishi Sasabuchi for Dead End Tribute – Song of Lunatics - (2013), Esprit D'Air released a cover and music video in 2018 with their lead singer Kai saying "it symbolizes part of my current life, and that means a lot to me", and by Morrie for Ballad D (2022) with a music video as well.

Sugizo covered "So Sweet So Lonely" for his 2020 album Ai to Chōwa in tribute to guitarist You, who died that same year and was cited by Sugizo as one of his greatest influences.

== Track listing ==
All lyrics are written by Morrie.

No.	Title	Music	Length
1.	"I Want Your Love"	Morrie and Hajime Okano	4:14
2.	"Sleep in the Sky"	Morrie	5:29
3.	"Baby Blue"	You	3:35
4.	"So Sweet So Lonely"	You and Hajime Okano	5:09
5.	"Crash 49"	Morrie and Hajime Okano	4:39
6.	"Trickster"	You	3:59
7.	"Hyper Desire"	Morrie	4:22
8.	"Promised Land"	You	4:24
9.	"I Spy"	You	3:27
10.	"I'm in a Coma"	You	4:37
11.	"Serafine"	You	5:48

Bonus tracks from Zero +2

No.	Title	Length
1.	"Good Morning Satellite"	4:39
2.	"Genshi no Karera" (原始のかけら)	5:08
Total length:		59:37

== Personnel ==
Dead End

- Morrie – vocals
- You – guitarr
- Crazy Cool Joe – bass
- Minato – drums

Production

- Hajime Okano and Dead End – production
- Steve Parker – engineering

== Chart performance ==
Year	Chart	Peak position
1989	Oricon	21
2009	Oricon	152

== See also ==
- 1989 in Japanese music
