= Tetsu Takano =

Japanese musician

- Promotional photograph of Tetsu Takano in Malice Mizer (1994)

Background information
- Born: Tetsu Takano; December 12, 1972 (age 53); Obihiro, Hokkaido, Japan
- Genres: Alternative rock; hard rock; gothic rock
- Occupations: Musician; singer-songwriter
- Instruments: Vocals; guitar
- Years active: 1991–present
- Label: Afro Skull Records
- Member of: Zigzo; Nil; The JuneJulyAugust; The Black Comet Club Band; Disco Volante; Sillys
- Formerly of: Malice Mizer: Mega8Ball; Ner-vous

Tetsu Takano (高野哲, Takano Tetsu; born December 12, 1972 in Obihiro, Japan) is a Japanese rock musician and singer-songwriter. He first became known as vocalist of the visual kei rock band Malice Mizer from 1992 to 1994. After leaving them, Tetsu formed and performed with Mega8Ball from 1995 to 1997. From 1999 to 2002 he was part of the supergroup Zigzo, who became quite popular despite being an independent band and reunited in 2012. In addition to Zigzo, Tetsu is currently active in the bands Nil, The JuneJulyAugust, Disco Volante and Sillys, all of which are on his record label Afro Skull Records.

== History ==
=== 1991–1994: Ner-vous and Malice Mizer ===
Tetsu Takano first entered music sometime in 1991 at the age of 18 as vocalist for the band Ner-vous. In January 1992, Ner-vous's drummer left and Kiyoshi Moro replaced him; however, he only had the chance to play with the band for two live shows before they disbanded. In March 1992, Tetsu went to see Kiyoshii play in his new band which included bassist Hiroyuki "Marawo" Kashimoto. Tetsu, Kashimoto, and Moro became good friends for years to come.

In August 1992, Tetsu became vocalist of the visual kei rock band Malice Mizer, alongside Mana, Közi, Yu~ki and Gaz. For the next two years they would perform live, release several demos, and have a song on an omnibus, shortly after which Gaz left and was replaced by Kami, before they were finally able to release their first full-length album, Memoire, in July 1994. Later that year the album would be released again as Memoire DX with the bonus track "Baroque", but at that point Tetsu had decided to leave the group. While the exact reason for his departure is not known, his parting words at his last show with them, on December 27, 1994, hinted at musical differences. This can arguably be verified by the sound of Tetsu's later musical endeavors, them being alternative and hard rock instead of gothic rock. While only eight Malice Mizer songs with Tetsu were recorded and released officially, nearly 10 more were written and performed by the band during that two-year period; these appear on a large number of bootlegs.

Mana said he contacted Tetsu in regards to him participating in the band's 25th anniversary concerts in September 2018, but the singer declined.

=== 1995-1998: Mega8Ball and Nil ===
Sometime in late 1994 or early 1995, Tetsu was part of the session band Forme'd Eros, providing vocals and guitar alongside Közi on bass and Yasu also on guitar and vocals. They performed only a few cover songs and the original composition, "Ima wa...". Around fall of 1995, Tetsu would team up with Yasu again to form Mega8Ball with Rikiji on bass and Nori on drums. Yasu left by the year's end and Rikiji had his friend Yoshiyuki replace him. Mega8Ball started touring again in 1996 and throughout 1997 until the release of their first album Hybrid. The band later disbanded and had its last live on December 29, 1997; Rikiji immediately joined Oblivion Dust. They released one demo tape, one album, and participated in an omnibus with Tetsu as lead vocalist. The band would later reunite without Tetsu in 2001. Rikiji has since become the only original member to stay in Mega8Ball and Tetsu has fondly referenced the band in online diary entries over the years.

Tetsu had grown tired of being in a band and not having control, so he decided to start his own solo unit. He recruited Kashimoto and Moro, friends from his Ner-vous days, as support members and entered the studio, eventually creating 20 songs. They became known as Nil in January 1998 debuting in his hometown of Tokyo. Nil's sound is self-described as "rock with punk, grunge, and funk mixed in". They toured and performed until November, when Kashimoto announced that he wanted to leave the band to pursue a traditional career. Tetsu and Moro continued on for several more lives, but eventually called it quits before the year's end. Moro would go on to start the band Mugiwara Boushi, performing as both drummer and vocalist.

=== 1998-2002: Zigzo and Nil restart ===
In early 1998, recently bandless musicians Ryo and Den (both ex:By-Sexual) and Sakura (ex:L'Arc-en-Ciel) started a session band that evolved into a full-fledged band when Tetsu joined in the summer of 1998. In February 1999, they debuted live under the secret band name Malice en Sex, a play-on words from their former band's names being Malice Mizer, L'Arc-en-Ciel, and By-Sexual. The name Zigzo, which is a streamlined romanization of the Japanese katakana spelling of "jigsaw," was soon officially decided upon. That summer they started touring, recording, and releasing at a feverish pace. Tetsu was the primary songwriter and lyricist of the group and only a few of the other songs were written by the group as a whole. They released eight singles, two albums, and several videos within the next two years and grew to have considerable success as a group. Zigzo announced their breakup and the band's final single "Chelsea" addressed some of the concerns by the band and of the fans. The band would have The Last Scene, its series of final shows, in March 2002.

While the exact reason of Zigzo's disbandment is not known, it is likely a decision on Tetsu's part that caused the end of the band, possibly out of his desire to create music outside the restrictions of the major music scene. In January 2002, before Zigzo even finished touring, Tetsu decided to restart Nil and got in contact with Kashimoto, who rejoined the band as well; the first song they composed was "Mona Lisa." Moro, who had grown tired of his band Mugiwara Boushi and moved to Jamaica, was not initially interested in rejoining, so Tetsu and Kashimoto held auditions for a new drummer and finally settled on female drummer Kaori Kobayashi. However, she didn't get a chance to play with the band, as Moro reconsidered and moved back to Japan in June 2002. He was welcomed back into the band and by the end of the month they had recorded their first mini album Nil from Hell. They then started touring right away and eventually recorded their second mini album Sayonara da Vinci by the end of the summer. Both mini albums were released back to back, the first in September and the second in December, and are meant to be complimentary albums. While certain similarities in lyrical content and musical style exist between Zigzo and Nil, themes such as Humanity, Love, Peace, War, Life, and Death have a much greater roll in the latter. Around this time, Tetsu formed his own record label, Afro Skull Records, which naturally Nil was signed to.

=== 2003-2010: Nil's first album and lineup changes ===
Nil would perform throughout 2003 writing new songs and only releasing one 4-track EP, Down to Dawn. In May 2004, Nil released their debut full-length album 12 Inplosion. Several more releases came out in a rather quick pace throughout the remainder of the year; Tetsu even wanted to start recording the second album mere months after the first album was released, but was talked into doing the cover album The Covering Inferno instead. In any case, the band had starting recording again in October 2004 for their second album. The constant recording and performing seemed to have fatigued Kashimoto and Moro to the point where they both decided to leave Nil at the end of the "Covering Inferno Tour" on January 10, 2005. While the reason for their departure is not known for sure, Tetsu and Nil recorded, released, and toured quite a lot compared to many other indie bands and it is possible that such a constant hectic schedule was too much for Kashimoto and Moro. Another possibility was the direction of the second album which was more pop than previously before. Whatever the reason may have been, Tetsu's ambitions for the band took a deep blow and Nil's second album Excalibur was completed during the turmoil and aftermath of their departure. The situation seemed frail and he openly reaffirmed his ambitions and Nil's fans repeatedly through his diary and fan-club messages that he would continue on. At one point he stated that his life work is Nil and that he would never stop the band. Moro and Kashimoto would later go on to perform together in bands such as Gold77, The High Streets, and Toguar and the Creeplands. In July 2006, Moro restarted Mugiwara Boushi under the name Mugi.

Drummer Sota "Furuton" Oofuruton (ex:Oblivion Dust and support drummer of Mega8Ball) and Masaru Kobayashi (ex:Soy Sauce Sonic, ex:Sads, The Cro-Magnons) joined the group and toured for the abbreviated Excalibur Tour. Two mini albums, Scherzo and Agape, were recorded and released right after the tour. Unfortunately, Furuton would disappear soon after the recording sessions, recommitting to his tour with Hyde from L'Arc-en-Ciel. Tetsu enlisted the support of Hiroyuki Kazama (ex:Fantastic Designs) who would eventually become a permanent member of Nil.

And so, the fourth stage of Nil had begun and the forming of a permanent lineup allowed the band more time to play together, try out new songs live, and record together at a somewhat slower pace. An extended "Agape Tour" started and ended by midsummer of 2006 and recording for their next release happened in between the days off during the tour. Tetsu, ever ambitious, also decided to record on his own as a solo artist in May and August 2006 he released The Ball and Wall, featuring acoustic takes of many ballad and mid-tempo Nil songs and their two unreleased tracks, "Beautiful You" and "Hotel."

=== 2010–present: The JuneJulyAugust, The Black Comet Club Band, Disco Volante and Sillys ===
In 2010 Tetsu formed the band The JuneJulyAugust, with Koji Kajiwara on drums, Hajime Sato on piano, and himself on vocals and guitar. They released their self-titled debut single on August 20, 2010, their first DVD on December 10, and their first album on January 12, 2011.

On November 20, 2011, Sakura held a birthday concert at Shibuya O-West where Tetsu performed with Nil. However, Tetsu, Sakura, Ryo and Den performed a surprise set as Zigzo and announced that the band will officially restart activities at a concert on March 17, 2012 at Akasaka Blitz.

On April 18, 2012, The JuneJulyAugust released their second album Edelweiss.

In 2015, Tetsu formed another band with Masaru Kobayashi, Kazama Hiroyuki and Hajime Sato, plus the addition of second drummer Jin Terui (Pulling Teeth). The Black Comet Club Band released their self-titled first album on October 7, 2015.

Tetsu, Kobayashi and Terui formed the band Disco Volante with Tōru Yoshida (Preppy Boys Slippy) in February 2022. Their first album, made with Mucc guitarist Miya, was released that April.

In February 2024, Tetsu announced the formation of Sillys, a trio of himself on guitar and vocals, Chirolyn (hide with Spread Beaver) on bass and vocals, and Seizi Kimura (Zeppet Store) on drums and vocals. They will hold their first tour throughout April.

In February 16th, 2025, it was announced that Nil would release their new full album "lil ill" on April 27th, along with a tour. It was also announced that Jin Terui would join Nil permanently as a drummer, replacing Hiroyuki Kazama.
