= Fake? =

Japanese rock group

- Origin: Tokyo, Japan
- Genres: Alternative rock; electronic rock; experimental rock
- Years active: 2001–present
- Labels: Warner Music Japan; Tokuma Japan Communications; Music Taste
- Members: Ken Lloyd; Inoran
- Website: Official website

Fake? is a Japanese rock band, currently consisting of vocalist Ken Lloyd and guitarist Inoran. Originally formed as a duo in 2001, Inoran left the group in 2005, and Ken continued Fake? as his solo project. After 21 years, Inoran rejoined the group in 2026.

== History ==
=== 2001–2005: Formation and Inoran's departure ===
In late 2001, Oblivion Dust vocalist Ken Lloyd joined up with Luna Sea guitarist Inoran to form Fake?. With both of their bands newly disbanded, the two musicians wanted to overturn the images associated with those previous groups; Ken said, "We didn't want to make something that people could easily predict—like, 'Oh, this is what happens when you combine INORAN from LUNA SEA with KEN from OBLIVION DUST.' Instead, we wanted to create something that would make people think, 'Wait, it turned out like this?' or 'They're doing that kind of thing, too?' We figured that no matter what we did, people would call it 'fake', so we just went ahead and named it FAKE?."

They duo did not go public until early 2002, when they held a secret two-day Show Case event at Liquidroom Shinjuku. A short time later, Fake? released their first single, "Taste Maximum". They released another single, "Someday", and their first album, Breathe In..., which reached the top 30 on the Oricon charts despite a lack of promotion, major magazine interviews, or photo-sessions. They then took part in the 2002 Summer Sonic Festival in Tokyo, Osaka and Hong Kong. They also played gigs at Nagoya Diamond Hall, Osaka Namba Hatch and Akasaka Blitz. On November 2, the band started its Live Tour, performing seven concerts in five towns. The final concert of the tour, on November 24 at Zepp Tokyo, was later broadcast in Japan by WOWOW.

In January 2003, Fake? released the album Tomorrow Today (with collaboration vocals of Kokia on the song "Care"). They toured for the rest of the year. Due to differences about the direction of their careers, they changed their record label from Warner Music Japan to Tokuma Japan Communications.

In the beginning of 2004, they performed the concert Stepping Stone Extra Date, which was later to be released as their first DVD. On March 13, they released the mini album New Skin. Shortly thereafter, they released another single "Praise", which was used as the opening theme for the Japanese broadcast of the South Korean cartoon Aqua Kids, and their third album The Art of Losing Touch. They began their Tour of Losing Touch, playing at six locations. The last event of this tour was on July 6 at the Shibuya-AX, where their Tour of Losing Touch DVD was recorded. Subsequent tours were titled Tour of Losing Touch: Live Like Billy and Tour of Losing Touch: Final.

In 2005, they released the single "Pulse", which was used as the second opening theme for the television anime Onmyō Taisenki, along with an English version, and released the album Made with Air. After the Tour of [?], Inoran left the band in October, due to musical differences. The Live Tour? Final at Shibuya-AX DVD, which was recorded on the last day of the tour, was released on December 21, 2005, together with a compilation album titled simply Fake?. Ken later said that, by the time of The Art of Losing Touch, what he wanted to do and what Inoran wanted to do no longer aligned, and by the time of Made with Air, they were on completely different paths, leading to Inoran's departure.

=== 2006–2017: Ken's solo project ===
Ken would later state that he still considered Fake? a band even after Inoran's departure, because he viewed himself as working together with the musicians who supported him. He also said that, had he begun a solo career instead, it would have sounded exactly the same as Fake?. In mid-2006, they released their fifth album Songs from Beelzebub, which includes a collaboration with Inoran's Luna Sea bandmate Shinya. The Live from Beelzebub Tour finished its Japanese leg on July 4 at the Ebisu Liquid Room and was followed by a show at Pentaport Rock Festival in South Korea on July 29.

In late 2006, Marilyn Is a Bubble was released with contributions from Anna Tsuchiya, Hidehiko Hoshino and Yutaka Higichi (both of Buck-Tick), "Ali" (Monoral) and others. K.A.Z, "d-kiku" and "Shigeo" (Mold, the Samos) each contributed a remix song (a total of three), that were released on the internet as a bonus to those who bought the albums Songs From Beelzebub and Marilyn Is a Bubble. After the band's "Live With Marilyn" tour in early 2007, along with a concert on July 28 at the Ebisu Liquid Room in Tokyo, the band took a break because Ken Lloyd was concentrated on the return of Oblivion Dust.

In early 2009, Ken announced that a new Fake? album was in the process of being written. On June 12, 2009 the band performed in New Jersey, United States at AnimeNEXT, where Ken announced that he hoped to bring his music to the US by the next year.

On February 24, 2010, Ken released the third endeavor of post-Inoran Fake?, entitled Switching On X, under the label Music Taste and being produced by Martin Glover. A suspected lack of promotion, as later indicated by the band's switch in management, likely led to the album reaching the band's worst Oricon ranking ever; it topped a meager 203rd for only one week on the chart. Around the time of the album release, Ken Lloyd created his first English official Facebook page and Twitter account. On his Facebook page he answered questions from fans around the world in video messages.

In April 2012, Ken announced he was working on new Fake? stuff, then later confirmed this with news about a new album compilation entitled Fake? 2002-2012 Decade Selection under Tokuma Japan Communications, with this album to include an exclusive song called "Feel It" (a collaboration with Inoran). On November 19, the band held a gig at Daikanyama Unit in Tokyo, where they released an exclusive EP called Nail. They announced a new gig on February 23, 2013, called Fake? Live -Decade-, where Inoran joined Fake? on stage. The concert was recorded and released on DVD as Fake -Decade Live- on October 2, 2013.

To commemorate their 15th anniversary, Fake? released "Mad Hatz' Merry Go Round" on February 25, 2017. That same day, they held an anniversary concert at Ebisu Liquidroom titled Queen's Banquet, where Inoran once again appeared as a guest.

=== 2026–present: Inoran's return ===
In November 2026, it was announced that Inoran had officially rejoined Ken in Fake?. They will hold a concert series titled Fake? Live 2027 'Full Circle' at Spotify O-East on February 28, 2027, and at EX Theater Roppongi on March 20, 2027. Their backing band will feature The Bonez guitarist Koki, Sid Bassist Aki, Rize drummer Nobuaki Kaneko, DJ Bass and d-kiku as manipulator.

== Current support members ==
- DJ Bass – DJ, also known as "Gyutang Clan", he started with Fake? in 2002 and has a solo career. He also collaborated with Inoran on his solo career in the last years.
- Koki – guitar
- Aki – bass
- Nobuaki Kaneko – drums

== Former support members ==
- DJ Uppercut – DJ (2002)
- Ju-ken – bass (2002)
- Hiko – bass (2002)
- Hasegawa Akihiko – bass (2003)
- Kaoru Noguchi – drums (2002 to 2006)
- Shibuya Ken – drums, he participated on the album Songs From Beelzebub in 2006 and was a support member in 2007.
- Morrissey – bass, (2003 to 2008), used to be the bassist for Camino. In the past, he's played support for Shuubi, Speena, and Breath and is currently playing in his own band, Stray Pig Vangard.
- Pablo – guitar, (2003 to 2008), previously in Giraffe in 1999. He was then a support guitarist for Fake? and Takui Nakajima. He is currently in Pay Money to My Pain and also he is Oblivion Dust support member.
- Eric Zay – guitar, (2006 to 2008), he's played support for Monoral, Sugizo, etc. Currently in his own band, Bloom Underground and also writes jingles for television. He is also one of the founders of independent record label Pure Records along with Casey Rankin.
- Rikiji – bass, collaborator in one gig at end of 2010.
- Mine – guitar, collaborator from 2009, also works with Anna Tsuchiya.
- Fire – bass, collaborator in 2009, also works with Sugizo
- Kife – programming, collaborator from 2009.
- Masuo – drums, he started with Fake? in 2008.

== Discography ==
=== Studio albums ===
- Breathe In... (July 10, 2002)
- Tomorrow Today (January 22, 2003)
- The Art of Losing Touch (June 23, 2004)
- Made with Air (June 17, 2005)
- Songs from Beelzebub (May 24, 2006)
- Marilyn Is a Bubble (November 22, 2006)
- Switching on X (February 24, 2010)
- The Lost Generation (September 17, 2014)

=== Mini-albums ===
- New Skin (March 17, 2004)
- Nail (November 19, 2012) (limited EP for those who bought it on "Fake? Showcase III" gig at Daikanyama UNIT)
- Stone (June 23, 2013) (limited EP for those who bought it on "Fallen Angels" gig at Daikanyama UNIT)
- Together (September 29, 2013) (limited EP for those who bought it on "Grind-A-Go-Go" gig at Daikanyama UNIT)

=== Compilation albums ===
- Fake? Best Album (December 21, 2005)
- Fake? 2002-2012 Decade Selection (August 1, 2012)

=== Singles ===
- "Taste Maximum" (February 27, 2002)
- "Someday" (May 22, 2002)
- "Here We Go" (December 11, 2002)
- "Praise" (April 21, 2004)
- "Just Like Billy" (November 25, 2004)
- "Pulse" (March 16, 2005)
- "Pulse" -English Version- (April 1, 2005)
- "Addicted" (February 25, 2015)
- "White Rabbit Inc" (December 6, 2016)

=== Home videos ===
- Stepping Stone Extra Date (June 3, 2004)
- www.hedfuc.com (November 25, 2004)
- Tour of Losing Touch Shibuya-Ax (December 22, 2004)
- Live Tour ? Final at Shibuya-Ax (December 21, 2005)
- Live From Beelzebub Tour (November 22, 2006)
- Used to Be a Bad Thing's PV (limited DVD for those who attended any gig of "Live with Marilyn" in early 2007)
- Fake -Decade Live- (October 2, 2013)

=== Bonus songs ===
- "Disco" (Death Club mix) remixed by K.A.Z
- "Retina" (Dilated Pupils mix) remixed by "Shigeo" (Mold, the Samos)
- "Closer to Marilyn" (The Other Dimension) remixed by "d-kiku"
