= Ken Lloyd =

British musician (born 1976)

- Born: Kentaro James Shibuya Lloyd; 25 March 1976 (age 50); London, England
- Origin: Japan
- Genres: Alternative rock; hard rock; post-grunge; punk rock; alternative metal; electronic rock; experimental rock
- Occupations: Musician; singer-songwriter
- Instruments: Vocals; guitar
- Years active: 1996–present
- Labels: Cutting Edge; Motorod; Warner Music Japan; Tokuma Japan Communications; Music Taste; Universal Music
- Member of: Oblivion Dust; Atom on Sphere
- Formerly of: Fake?

Kentaro James Shibuya Lloyd (Japanese: ケン・ロイド, Hepburn: Roido Ken; born 25 March 1976), better known as Ken Lloyd, is a British-born musician and singer-songwriter based in Japan. Fluent in both Japanese and English, he writes lyrics in both languages. He is currently in Oblivion Dust, Atom on Sphere and Fake?, the latter of which is now his solo project.

== Biography ==
With an English father lawyer and a Japanese mother, Lloyd graduated from secondary school in London, England and went to college in Japan. Once in Japan, he left college to join Oblivion Dust, with guitarist Kazuhito "K.A.Z" Iwaike, drummer Taka Motomura and bassist Derek Forbes. Lloyd began his career in the band on guitar but soon switched to lead vocalist. He later said that he joined the band whilst he was drunk. In response to his parents, who expressed concerns about his future, he printed the message "currently disobeying my parents" on his guitar pick.

== Career ==
Lloyd also worked as a VJ on the MTV Japan TV show British Code, where he played music videos by British bands. As Oblivion Dust became more popular, he left the show to concentrate on the band.

On 23 September 2001, Oblivion Dust disbanded. That same year, Lloyd joined up with Luna Sea guitarist Kiyonobu "Inoran" Inoue to form Fake?. In October 2005, Inoran left the group, leaving Lloyd the only member, effectively making it his solo project.

In 2007 he hosted a short-lived radio show at Inter-FM called Ken Lloyd's 13 Days, every Friday from January to March 2007. On 28 June Oblivion Dust announced their reunion and released their fifth album, the self-titled Oblivion Dust.

On 24 February 2010, Lloyd released the third post-Inoran album by Fake?, Switching On X. A suspected lack of promotion, as later indicated by the band's change in management, likely led to the album reaching the band's worst Oricon ranking ever; it reached a meagre 203 with only one week on the chart.

After another Oblivion Dust break, during which the members took time to work on each of their individual projects, the band announced two live shows for early 2011 titled "Ashes to Dust 2011". The shows were held at Shibuya-AX on 18 and 19 February. On 1 March 2011 the official fan club of the band, "Overdose", was renewed.

In early October 2011, it was announced that Lloyd had formed a new band, with other well-known Japanese musicians, called Atom on Sphere. Their debut album was released on 21 December 2011.
