= Sons of All Pussys =

Japanese rock band

- Also known as: S.O.A.P.
- Origin: Japan
- Genres: Alternative rock
- Years active: 2002–2006
- Label: Danger Crue
- Members: Ken; Ein; Sakura
- Website: Official site

Sons of All Pussys (typeset as SONS OF ALL PUSSYS, abbreviated as S.O.A.P.) was a Japanese rock band. Formed in 2002 by Ken, his former L'Arc-en-Ciel bandmate Sakura, and German born model Ein (who appeared in L'Arc-en-Ciel's PVs for "Heaven's Drive" and "Love Flies").

== Members ==
- Ken - vocals, guitar (L'Arc-en-Ciel)
- Ein - bass
- Sakura - drums (ex-L'Arc-en-Ciel, Zigzo, Lion Heads, Creature Creature, Rayflower, By-Sex)

== Discography ==
=== Mini albums ===
- Grace (February 6, 2003), Oricon Albums Chart Peak Position: 23
- Gimme a Guitar (March 26, 2003), Oricon Albums Chart Peak Position: 25
- High (November 26, 2003), Oricon Albums Chart Peak Position: 31

=== Singles ===
- "Paradise" (July 7, 2004), Oricon Singles Chart Peak Position: 11

=== Videos ===
- Bubble Festival 2003-Haru (October 20, 2003)
- Ichiban-Blow (October 20, 2004)
- S.S.J.B.F. in Budōkan (October 20, 2004)
