= Nil (band) =

Japanese rock band

- Origin: Tokyo, Japan
- Genres: Alternative rock
- Years active: 1998, 2002–present
- Label: Afro Skull Records
- Members: Tetsu Takano; Masaru Kobayashi; Jin Terui
- Past members: Hiroyuki "Marawo" Kashimoto; Kyoshi Moro; Sota "Furuton" Ofuruton; Hiroyuki Kazama
- Website: Official site

Nil (stylized as nil) is a Japanese rock band formed in 1998 by Tetsu Takano (ex-Malice Mizer, ex-Mega8Ball, Zigzo, The JuneJulyAugust), Hiroyuki Kashimoto and Kyoshi Moro. The original intent of Nil was to become Tetsu's solo unit and even though it has become a full-fledged band, all lyrics and songwriting has been solely handled by Tetsu. The band only lasted briefly during its first incarnation and went on hiatus by the end of 1998. It would not resurface until the middle of 2002 when they would start recording again and Tetsu formed his own record label, Afro Skull Records. The name "Nil" literally means "absolute zero" and as an acronym refers to "native irreligious language".

In 2005, Nil had many setbacks which resulted in the departure of founding members Kashimoto and Moro who both left the band on January 10, 2005, the last day of the "Touring Inferno" tour. Eventually replacement drummer Furuton (ex-Oblivion Dust, ex-Mega8Ball support) left the band after only 6 months. By the end of 2005 Nil finally settled down with the addition of Masaru Kobayashi (ex-Soy Sauce Sonix, ex-Sads, The Cro-Magnons) on bass and Kazama Hiroyuki (ex-Fantastic Designs) on drums.

In the years since resuming activities, Nil has recorded and released 5 full albums, 7 mini albums, 1 cover album, 1 live album, 1 compilation album, 3 singles, 2 fan-club only CDs and 8 DVDs. Tetsu has claimed that Nil is his life's work and despite some bumps in the road, he has shown no signs of slowing down with his music and the band Nil.

In February 16, 2025, it was announced that Nil would release their new full album lil ill on April 27th, along with a tour. It was also announced that Jin Terui (Pulling Teeth, The Black Comet Club Band, Disco Volante, ROODY'S) would join Nil permanently as a drummer, replacing Hiroyuki Kazama.

== Members ==
- Tetsu Takano (ex-Ner-vous, ex-Malice Mizer, ex-Mega8Ball, ex-Zigzo, The JuneJulyAugust, The Black Comet Club Band) – vocals, guitar, songwriter, leader (1998, 2002–present)
- Masaru Kobayashi (ex-Soy Sauce Sonix, ex-Sads, The Cro-Magnons, The Black Comet Club Band) – bass (2005–present)
- Jin Terui (Pulling Teeth, The Black Comet Club Band, Disco Volante, ROODY'S) – drums (2025–present)

=== Former ===
- Hiroyuki "Marawo" Kashimoto – bass (1998, 2002–2005)
- Kyoshi Moro (ex-Ner-vous, Mugiwara Boushi) – drums (1998, 2002–2005)
- Sota "Furuton" Ofuruton (ex-Oblivion Dust, ex-Mega8Ball support) – drums (2005)
- Hiroyuki Kazama (ex-Fantastic Designs, The Black Comet Club Band) – drums (2005–2025)

== Discography ==
=== Albums ===
- 12Inplosion (May 8, 2004), Oricon Albums Chart Peak Position: No. 161
  - The song "Hate Beat!" was used as the ending theme of the TV program Quiz! Hexagon.
- Excalibur (エクスカリバー, April 6, 2005) No. 184
- The Painkiller (January 24, 2007) No. 179
- The Great Spirits (March 19, 2008, compilation album) No. 211
- Multiness (マルチネス, September 10, 2008) No. 176
- Scotoma (September 16, 2009) No. 198
- Granvia (September 03, 2014) No. 161
- lil ill (April 27, 2025)

=== Mini albums ===
- Nil from Hell (September 1, 2002)
- Sayonara da Vinci (さよならダヴィンチ, December 1, 2002)
- Down to Dawn (September 18, 2003)
- The Covering Inferno (November 25, 2004, cover album) No. 220
- Agape (アガペー, November 2, 2005, limited edition EP available only at live appearances or by mail-order)
- Scherzo (スケルツオ, November 2, 2005) No. 259
- Man Woman (マンウーマン, October 25, 2006) No. 234
- Guitar and Skirt (ギタートスカート, November 22, 2006) No. 274
- Aria (December 13, 2006) No. 296
- Geron (ゲロン, September 12, 2007) No. 210
- Warp Rock (September 8, 2010) No. 223
- Wildflower EP (May 1, 2026)

=== Singles ===
- "Drop" (March 16, 2005), Oricon Singles Chart Peak Position: No. 121
- "Gita to Sukato" (ギタートスカート, November 22, 2006)
- "Aria" (December 13, 2006)

=== Live album ===
- Stroke! Swing!! Shout!!! (January 10, 2005)

=== Fan-club only CDs ===
- Thank You (July 2004)
- One Day Ver. DS Mix (November 2005)
- Thank You Rerecording (2010)

=== Compilations ===
- Search Out the Jams: The Pogo Tribute Album (October 8, 2008)
  - Contributed a cover of the song "1990 (Machiwabita Toki)" (1990(待ちわびた時))

=== DVDs ===
- Stronger Than Paranoid (July 2004, PV collection)
- Tears for Killers (March 4, 2006, limited edition collection of PVs available only at live appearances or by mail-order)
- The Pirates (February 2007)
- Tonight! Revolution! (March 24, 2007, live concert)
- MultinessSpecial (April 11, 2009, live concert)
- Sco-Tomato (September 13, 2009)
- "W.H.M" (January 1, 2010, live concert)
- The Warp Rock Studio (September 20, 2010, PV collection)
