= Bisexual (disambiguation) =

Bisexuality better known as bisexual, in human sexuality, describes a person that is sexually attracted to persons of both the same sex and persons of the opposite sex.

Bisexual may also refer to:

- Bisexual characteristics, having an ambiguous sexual identity (e.g., epicenity or androgyny)
- A bisexual flower (monoicy), in botany, one that possesses both male (pollen-producing) and female (seed-producing) parts
- A bisexual plant (monoecy), in botany, having separate male and female cones or flowers on the same plant
- Dioecy, in biology, a species that has members of two different distinct sexes (e.g., humans), opposed to unisexual (only one sex present, always females)
- The Bisexual, a 2018 British-American comedy-drama television series

== See also ==
- By-Sexual, a Japanese visual kei punk rock band from Osaka
- Hermaphrodite, an organism producing gametes of both sexes
