= Zigzo =

Japanese rock supergroup

- Also known as: Malice en Sex
- Origin: Tokyo, Japan
- Genres: Alternative rock; hard rock; punk rock
- Years active: 1999–2002, 2011, 2012–present
- Labels: Heat Wave/Triad, Crown Stones
- Members: Tetsu; Ryo; Den; Sakura
- Website: zigzo.net

Zigzo (stylized as ZIGZO) is a Japanese rock supergroup that originally started activities in 1999 and disbanded in 2002. Each member came from a prominent band and they became very popular in the indies scene. They disbanded after their last show on March 16, 2002, reportedly due to musical differences.

Tetsu subsequently formed Nil, The JuneJulyAugust and started his own record label, Ryo and Den formed the bands Pt. and Test-No., and Sakura joined Sons of All Pussys, Creature Creature, Rayflower and became guitarist for Lion Heads. In May 2011, Ryo, Den and Sakura teamed up again, this time to reform By-Sex. After a surprise performance on November 20, 2011, Zigzo officially restarted activities the following year on March 17.

== Reunion ==
On November 20, 2011, Sakura held a birthday concert at Shibuya O-West where each member performed with their current bands. However, together they performed a surprise set as Zigzo and announced that they will officially restart activities at a concert on March 17, 2012 at Akasaka Blitz titled The 2nd Scene Zigzo. At the show they released an album that was recorded "live" at a rehearsal on June 6, 2011. On October 10, 2012, they released their third studio album The Battle of Love.

The band's greatest hits album Got "S" and Dis-Star -Best of Zigzo-, released prior to their breakup, was re-released on Blu-spec CD2 on September 18, 2013, with a DVD of the music videos for all eight of their singles. Zigzo released their first mini album True Impulse on July 17, and three days later allowed fans to watch them rehearse at a special event at Tower Records in Shibuya. They also participated in the HIV/AIDS benefit concert Hope and Live ~ HIV/AIDS Support and Treatment Benefit Concert 2013, which was held on August 26–28 at Club Citta.

Zigzo released the album Forever Young on July 1, 2014, in celebration of their fifteenth anniversary. It includes a re-recording of their 1999 single "Himawari". The self-cover album Zippy Gappy Zombies was released on July 1, 2019 to celebrate their 20th anniversary. Sold only at concerts, its includes a track list as voted on by fans and one new song. Their fifth full album, Across the Horizon, was mastered by Miya of Mucc and was released on June 20, 2021.

== Members ==
- Tetsu Takano (高野哲) – vocals, rhythm guitar (ex-Malice Mizer, ex-Mega8Ball,→Nil, The JuneJulyAugust)
- Ryoji "Ryo" Okamoto (岡本竜治) – lead guitar (ex-By-Sexual,→Pt.,→Test-No., By-Sex)
- Hiroyuki "Den" Onishi (大西啓之) – bass (ex-By-Sexual, ex-Sister's No Future,→Pt.,→Test-No., By-Sex)
- Yasunori "Sakura" Sakurazawa (櫻澤泰徳) – drums, leader (ex-L'Arc-en-Ciel,→Sons of All Pussys, Lion Heads, Creature Creature, Rayflower, By-Sex)

== Discography ==
=== Studio albums ===
- Monster Music (October 1, 1999), Oricon Albums Chart Peak Position: No. 25
- Add9 Suicide (September 27, 2000) No. 38
- The Battle of Love (October 10, 2012) No. 46
- True Impulse (July 17, 2013, mini album) No. 59
- Forever Young (July 1, 2014) No. 60
- Across the Horizon (June 20, 2021)

=== Other albums ===
- Got "S" and Dis-Star -Best of Zigzo- (January 1, 2002, compilation album) No. 239 (2013 re-release)
- 20110620 (March 17, 2012, self-cover album sold only at concerts)
- Zippy Gappy Zombies (July 1, 2019, self-cover album sold only at concerts)
- Retake Best (2020 Ver.) (June 20, 2021, self-cover album sold only at concerts)

=== Singles ===
- "Chi to Ase to Namida no Uragawa no Happy" (血と汗と涙の裏側のハッピー; July 1, 1999), Oricon Singles Chart Peak Position: No. 22
- "Himawari" (ひまわり; "Sunflower", August 21, 1999) No. 43
- "Splash!" (February 23, 2000) No. 42
- "Tonight, I Will Fall" (June 21, 2001) No. 29
- "Walk" (September 20, 2000) No. 33
- "The World Introduction" (February 1, 2001) No. 48
- "Flow" (June 20, 2001) No. 43
- "Chelsea" (チェルシー; November 21, 2001) No. 61
- "Big Bang Boogie" (November 24, 2017)

=== Videos ===
- The 1st Scene Zigzo (December 1, 1999, VHS concert from August 31, 1999 at Akasaka Blitz)
- Songs from Gentle Heart ~ Video Clips '99 - '00 (February 21, 2001, VHS music videos)
- Wonderful Days (Fanclub-only VHS concert from December 27, 2001 at Shibuya-AX)
- The Last Scene Zigzo (June 2002, DVD concert from their last live on March 16, 2002 at Akasaka Blitz)
- The 2nd Scene Zigzo (June 16, 2012, DVD concert from their reunion live on March 17, 2012 at Akasaka Blitz)
- Beyond the Moment (January 11, 2013)
- Living in Asia "3 Days in a Well" Music Video #Big Bang Boogie (November 24, 2017, DVD concert and a music video)
