= Sonata Arctica discography =

Cataloging of published recordings by Sonata Arctica

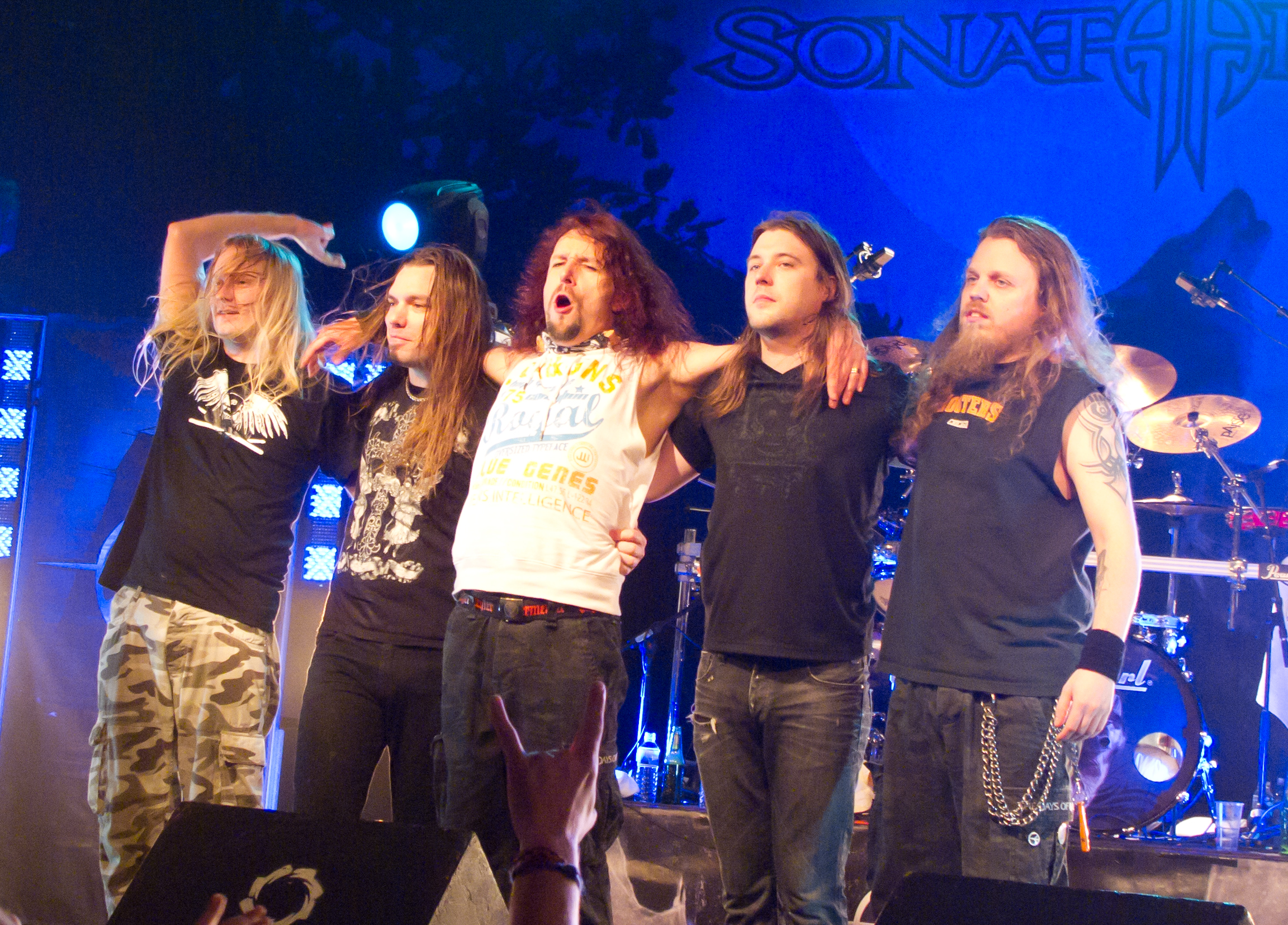
- Curtain call to Sonata Arctica in 2011
- Studio albums: 11
- Extended plays: 4
- Live albums: 3
- Compilation albums: 5
- Tribute albums: 1
- Singles: 29
- Video albums: 2
- Music videos: 18
- Demos: 4

The discography of Sonata Arctica includes eleven studio albums, three live albums, five compilation albums, four EPs, twenty nine singles, four demos, two video albums and eighteen music videos.

== Studio albums ==
Year	Album details	Chart peak positions								Finnish sales and certifications
Year	Album details	FIN	AUT	FRA	GER	JPN	NLD	SWE	SWI	Finnish sales and certifications
1999	Ecliptica: Released: 22 November 1999; Label: Spinefarm; Format: CD, CS, LP	18	—	—	—	57	—	—	—	Gold (31,000+)
2001	Silence: Released: 4 September 2001; Label: Spinefarm; Format: CD, CS, LP	3	—	—	—	16	—	—	—	Gold (27,000+)
2003	Winterheart's Guild: Released: 3 June 2003; Label: Spinefarm; Format: CD	3	—	63	88	18	—	—	—	Gold (24,000+)
2005	Reckoning Night: Released: 8 February 2005 (US) 11 October 2004 (DE); Label: Nuclear Blast; Format: CD, LP, digital download	2	—	132	77	14	—	57	85	Gold (19,000+)
2007	Unia: Released: 22 May 2007; Label: Nuclear Blast; Format: CD, LP, digital download	1	62	101	35	23	—	27	40	Gold (24,000+)
2009	The Days of Grays: Released: 22 September 2009; Label: Nuclear Blast; Format: CD, LP, digital download	2	52	41	24	40	50	31	26	Gold (17,000+)
2012	Stones Grow Her Name: Released: 22 May 2012; Label: Nuclear Blast; Format: CD, LP, digital download	1	29	54	24	44	72	37	21	Gold (12,000+)
2014	Pariah's Child: Released: 1 April 2014; Label: Nuclear Blast; Format: CD, LP, digital download	1	30	74	31	70	52	50	13	
2016	The Ninth Hour: Released: 7 October 2016; Label: Nuclear Blast; Format: CD, LP, digital download	2	43	96	22	55	163	60	18	
2019	Talviyö: Released: 6 September 2019; Label: Nuclear Blast; Format: CD, LP	2	—	133	26	69	—	—	22	
2024	Clear Cold Beyond: Released: 8 March 2024; Label: Atomic Fire; Format: CD, LP	7	29	—	26	—	—	—	12	
"—" denotes releases that did not chart or were not released in that country.

== Live albums ==
Year	Album details	Finnish chart peak
2002	Songs of Silence – Live in Tokyo: Released: 20 November 2002; Label: Spinefarm (SPI 147 CD); Format: CD	22
2006	For the Sake of Revenge: Released: 31 March 2006; Label: Nuclear Blast (NB 1619–2); Format: CD (+DVD), LP, digital download	25
2011	Live in Finland: Released: 11 November 2011; Label: Nuclear Blast (NB 2486–0); Format: CD (+DVD), LP, digital download	1

== Compilation albums ==
Year	Album details	Finnish chart peak	Finnish sales and certifications
2005	The End of This Chapter: Released: 24 August 2005; Label: Marquee (MIZP-60002); Format: CD (+DVD)	—	
2006	The Collection: Released: 15 November 2006; Label: Spinefarm (SPI 278 CD); Format: CD	16	Gold (+22,200)
2018	The Harvests (2007–2017): Released: 25 July 2018; Label: AVALON (MICP-90110); Format: 2 CD	—	
2022	Acoustic Adventures – Volume One: Released: 21 January 2022; Label: Atomic Fire; Format: CD, LP, digital download	5	
2022	Acoustic Adventures – Volume Two: Released: 30 September 2022; Label: Atomic Fire; Format: CD, LP, digital download	25	
"—" denotes releases that did not chart.

== Extended plays ==
Year	EP details
2000	Successor: Released: 7 August 2000; Label: Spinefarm (SPI 106 CD); Format: CD, CS, LP
2001	Orientation: Released: 22 August 2001; Label: Marquee (MICP-10256); Format: CD
2003	Takatalvi: Released: 21 November 2003; Label: Marquee (MICP-10403); Format: CD
2004	Don't Say a Word: Released: 30 August 2004; Label: Nuclear Blast (NB 1348–2); Format: CD

== Singles ==
Year	Song	Finnish chart peak	Album
1999	"UnOpened"	16	Ecliptica
2001	"Wolf & Raven"	3	Silence
2001	"Last Drop Falls"	3	Silence
2003	"Victoria's Secret"	1	Winterheart's Guild
2003	"Broken"	3	Winterheart's Guild
2004	"Don't Say a Word"	1	Reckoning Night
2004	"Shamandalie"	3	Reckoning Night
2006	"Replica 2006"	1	The Collection
2007	"Paid in Full"	1	Unia
2009	"Flag in the Ground"	—	The Days of Grays
2009	"The Last Amazing Grays"	3	The Days of Grays
2012	"I Have a Right"	—	Stones Grow Her Name
2012	"Shitload of Money"	—	Stones Grow Her Name
2013	"Alone in Heaven"	—	Stones Grow Her Name
2014	"The Wolves Die Young"	—	Pariah's Child
2014	"Cloud Factory"	—	Pariah's Child
2014	"Love"	—	Pariah's Child
2015	"Christmas Spirits"	—	Non-album single
2016	"Closer to an Animal"	—	The Ninth Hour
2016	"Life"	—	The Ninth Hour
2019	"A Little Less Understanding"	—	Talviyö
2019	"Cold"	—	Talviyö
2019	"Who Failed the Most"	—	Talviyö
2021	"The Rest of the Sun Belongs to Me"	—	Acoustic Adventures – Volume One
2023	"First in Line"	—	Clear Cold Beyond
2023	"A Monster Only You Can't See"	—	Clear Cold Beyond
2024	"Dark Empath"	—	Clear Cold Beyond
2024	"California"	—	Clear Cold Beyond
2026	"Freedom Concept"	—	TBA

== Demos ==
Year	Album details
1996	Agre Pamppers: Released as: Tricky Beans; Tracks: 4
1996	Friend Till the End: Released as: Tricky Beans; Tracks: 4
1997	PeaceMaker: Released as: Tricky Beans; Tracks: 4
1999	FullMoon: Released as: Tricky Means; Tracks: 4

== Video albums ==
Year	Video details	Finnish chart peak	Finnish sales and certifications
2006	For the Sake of Revenge: Released: 31 March 2006; Label: Nuclear Blast (NB 1618–2); Format: DVD (+CD)	1	Gold (+6,500)
2011	Live in Finland: Released: 11 November 2011; Label: Nuclear Blast (NB2486SP); Format: 2DVD+2CD, Blu-ray	—	

== Tribute album ==
Year	Video details	Finnish chart peak	Finnish sales and certifications
2015	A Tribute to Sonata Arctica: Released: 12 September 2015; Label: Ouergh Records; Format: CD, digital download	—	

== Music videos ==
- "Wolf & Raven" (2001)
- "Broken" (Live) (2003)
- "Don't Say a Word" (2004)
- "Paid in Full" (2007)
- "Flag in the Ground" (2009)
- "The Last Amazing Grays (Live)" (2011)
- "I Have a Right" (2012)
- "Shitload of Money" (2012)
- "Alone in Heaven" (2013)
- "The Wolves Die Young" (2014)
- "Cloud Factory" lyric video (2014)
- "Love" (2014)
- "Closer to an Animal" lyric video (2016)
- "Life" (2016)
- "Cold" (2019)
- "Who Failed the Most" (2019)
- "For the Sake of Revenge" (2022)
- "A Monster Only You Can't See" lyric video (2023)
- "Dark Empath" (2024)
- "California" (2024)
- "Angel Defiled" (2024)
