= Q.E.D. (Acid Black Cherry album) =

Q.E.D
- CD only edition cover

Studio album by Acid Black Cherry
- Released: August 26, 2009
- Genre: Rock; hard rock
- Length: 60:08
- Language: Japanese
- Label: Motorod

Acid Black Cherry chronology
Black List (2008)	Q.E.D (2009)	『2012』 (2012)

Q.E.D. is the second studio album by Acid Black Cherry, the solo project of singer Yasu (formerly of Janne Da Arc). It was released on August 26, 2009, by Motorod (Avex Trax) and re-released on April 16, 2025.

== Musical style and themes ==
Q.E.D. was revealed as a concept album, featuring a suspenseful story told through its songs, described in the liner notes and on the official band website. CD Journal noted that the album ranges from hard rock to "soft songs".

== Promotion and release ==
The album was released in three versions: two featuring CD and DVD, and one that included the CD and a special booklet with a photobook.

Acid Black Cherry embarked on a nationwide tour to promote the album from September to November, wrapping up at the Nippon Budokan. A special concert on December 24 was also announced. However, Yasu reported that due to severe sore throat during rehearsals, surgery on his vocal cords was deemed necessary. The first concert of the tour, as well as the December 24 special, were canceled, but the others went ahead as scheduled. After the tour ended, the singer took a break from his activities to undergo the surgery.

The final concert at the Nippon Budokan was recorded and released on the live album Acid Black Cherry 2009 Tour “Q.E.D.”.

== Commercial performance and reception ==
Q.E.D. reached number two on the Oricon Albums Chart, where it remained for thirteen weeks. The 2025 re-release went to fifth place. At Tower Records, the album ranked between first and third on the regional charts and third on the main Japanese rock and pop albums chart.

CD Journal highlighted the vocal melodies, describing them as "large in scale and full of presence".

== Track listing ==
All music is composed by Yasu.

No.	Title	Length
1.	"Mother"	4:56
2.	"cord name【JUSTICE】"	4:31
3.	"Jigsaw" (ジグソ)	5:23
4.	"Tsumi to Batsu ~Kamisama no Alibi~" (罪と罰〜神様のアリバイ〜)	4:16
5.	"Nemuri Hime" (眠り姫)	5:16
6.	"Cherry Cherry" (チェリーチェリー)	5:07
7.	"1954 LOVE/HATE"	4:27
8.	"I'm not a ghost"	4:47
9.	"Yasashii Uso" (優しい嘘)	4:35
10.	"Kuroi Taiyo" (黒い太陽)	4:35
11.	"Maria"	6:37
12.	"20+∞Century Boys"	5:00
Total length:		60:08
