= For the Sake of Revenge =

2006 live album by Sonata Arctica

Live album by Sonata Arctica
- Released: 31 March 2006
- Recorded: 5 February 2005 in Shibuya-AX, Tokyo
- Genre: Power metal
- Length: CD: 69:48; DVD: 109:48
- Label: Nuclear Blast

Sonata Arctica chronology
The End of This Chapter (2005)	For the Sake of Revenge (2006)	The Collection (2006)

Professional ratings
Review scores
Source	Rating
Allmusic	link

For the Sake of Revenge is a live album and DVD recorded by the Finnish power metal band Sonata Arctica. It was recorded at Shibuya AX, Tokyo, Japan on 5 February 2005. Along with the CD there is a DVD in stereo and Surround 5.1 sound, which also includes Finnish commentary track by the band, Misplaced Cameras On Tour, a biography, discography and some photos.

== CD track listing ==
No.	Title	Length
1.	"Prelude for Reckoning"	2:16
2.	"Misplaced" (from Reckoning Night)	4:43
3.	"Blinded No More" (from Reckoning Night)	5:16
4.	"FullMoon (extract from "White Pearl, Black Oceans")" (from Ecliptica)	5:49
5.	"Victoria's Secret" (from Winterheart's Guild)	5:03
6.	"Broken" (from Winterheart's Guild)	5:26
7.	"8th Commandment" (from Ecliptica)	3:56
8.	"Shamandalie" (from Reckoning Night)	3:54
9.	"Kingdom for a Heart" (from Ecliptica)	4:17
10.	"Replica" (from Ecliptica)	4:08
11.	"My Land" (from Ecliptica)	4:36
12.	"Black Sheep" (from Silence)	4:00
13.	"Gravenimage" (from Winterheart's Guild)	2:23
14.	"Don't Say a Word" (from Reckoning Night)	6:35
15.	"The Cage / "Vodka" / "Hava Nagila" -sing-along" (from Winterheart's Guild)	7:26
Total length:		69:48

== DVD track listing ==
No.	Title	Length
1.	"Prelude for Reckoning"
2.	"Misplaced"
3.	"Blinded No More"
4.	"FullMoon (extract from "White Pearl, Black Oceans")"
5.	"Victoria's Secret"
6.	"Broken"
7.	"8th Commandment"
8.	"Shamandalie"
9.	"Kingdom for a Heart"
10.	"Replica"
11.	"My Land"
12.	"Black Sheep"
13.	"Sing in Silence"
14.	"San Sebastian"
15.	"The End of This Keyboard" / sing-along"
16.	"Gravenimage"
17.	"Don't Say a Word"
18.	"The Cage"
19.	"Vodka / "Hava Nagila" - sing-along"
20.	"Draw Me (Outro)"
Total length:		109:48

- There is also a biography, discography and a bonus feature called "The Men of the North in the Land of the Rising Sun" in the extras section.

== Personnel ==
- Tony Kakko – vocals
- Jani Liimatainen – guitar, backing vocals
- Marko Paasikoski – bass guitar, backing vocals
- Henrik Klingenberg – keyboards, keytar, backing vocals
- Tommy Portimo – drums

== Charts ==
Chart (2006)	Peak position
Finnish Albums (Suomen virallinen lista)	25

== Certifications ==
Certifications for For the Sake of Revenge DVD
Region	Certification	Certified units/sales
Finland (Musiikkituottajat)	Gold	6,533

== Info ==
- Recorded at Shibuya AX, Tokyo, Japan on 5 February 2005
- Mixed by Pasi Kauppinen at Studio57
- Mastered by Svante Forsbäck at Chartmakers
- Artwork by Gina "Ravnheart" Pitkänen

== Notes ==
- On "Black Sheep", Tony Kakko sings different lyrics after the intro. Instead of singing "In love with the maiden, the flower of winter, lowbrow children, in grove of the inland", Tony sings "We're not Iron Maiden, and we're not from England, we are Sonata, and we come from Finland." After this, however, Tony sings the lyrics as heard on the Silence album.

- In the middle of "Kingdom for a Heart" they play few lines from "Letter to Dana".

- In the song "Shamandalie", Tony Kakko also changes the line "Time went by" to "Years went by".

- In "Full Moon", Tony changes the lyrics from "Sitting in a corner all alone" to "Standing in a corner all alone", and, at the end of the second verse changes "Mess on the floor again" to "Makes him insane to know".

== Credits ==
- All songs written by T. Kakko, except "Prelude For Reckoning" by Jani Liimatainen
- Arrangements by Sonata Arctica
