= Terra Rosa =

Japanese heavy metal band

- Origin: Osaka, Japan
- Genres: Heavy metal, hard rock, progressive metal
- Years active: 1982–1992, 1999, 2008, 2016, 2020
- Labels: Mandrake Root, King
- Members: Kazue Akao; Masashi "Jill" Okagaki
- Past members: Kouji Yamaguchi; Hiromi Suzuki; Jun Itakura; Yuji "You" Adachi; Masaaki Tano; Toshihiro Osaki; Yosuke Miyake
- Website: https://terra-rosa.net/

Terra Rosa (Japanese: テラ・ローザ, Hepburn: Tera Rōza; Italian for "Pink Earth") was a Japanese heavy metal band formed by keyboardist Masashi "Jill" Okagaki and female vocalist Kazue Akao in Osaka in 1982. Their musical style was notably under the influence of Western metal, most notably British band Rainbow. They released three original albums and a live album before disbanding in 1992. Okagaki and Akao have reunited several times for limited reunions since 1999. Tomoyuki Hokari of Ok Music called Terra Rosa an important band in Japanese metal and hard rock. Writing for Nikkan Spa!, Sharin Yamano proposed their impact on the metal scene in Kansai is similar to that which X Japan had in the Kantō region.

== History ==
Terra Rosa was formed in 1982 by vocalist Kazue Akao and former X-Ray keyboardist Masashi "Jill" Okagaki. Their early years saw many line-up changes, including future Dead End members Yuji "You" Adachi and Masaaki Tano. In 1987, Terra Rosa released their first album The Endless Basis on the independent record label Mandrake Root. Their lineup at the time included guitarist Yousuke Miyake, bassist Koji Yamaguchi, and Starless drummer Nobuo Horie. The band signed to a sublabel of King Records, and re-recorded and re-released The Endless Basis in 1989. Honesty, their second album, was also released in 1989 with guitarist Hiromi Suzuki and Marino drummer Jun Itakura. The band followed it up with Sase the following year, featuring Yoshitsugu Imai on guitar. Terra Rosa disbanded on January 17, 1992, after a concert at Umeda Banana Hall. Sharin Yamano later proposed that, by being so closely tied to Western heavy metal of the past, the band could not survive in the Japanese metal scene of the time.

In 1999, the album Primal, compiling older and rare tracks, was released and Akao, Okagaki, Miyake and Horie reunited for a performance. Former bass guitarist Koji Yamaguchi died in December 2006. Terra Rosa reunited for a performance to mourn Yamaguchi on January 5, 2008. They also released the self-cover album Terra Rosa of Angry Waves, re-recording the bassist's favorite songs as a tribute to him. In 2016, at former guitarist You's suggestion, Akao and Okagaki performed a limited tour with him, Animetal bassist Masaki and former Galneryus drummer Jun-ichi Satoh. They only performed older songs on the three-date tour, aside from one new composition by You, and reissued the 1999 Primal compilation as Primal Plus. A live album from the tour, Terra Rosa Live from Coda, was released in 2017. In 2020, Akao, Okagaki and Miyake held The Endless Basis Tour.

== Discography ==
=== Studio albums ===
- The Endless Basis (1987)
- Honesty (1989)
- Sase (1990)

=== Other albums ===
- Live... Final Class Day (1992, live album)
- Primal (1999, compilation)
- Terra Rosa of Angry Waves Tribute to Koji Yamaguchi (2008, re-recordings)
- Primal Plus (2016, expanded reissue of the 1999 compilation)
- Terra Rosa Live from Coda (2017, live album)
- Terra Rosa 30th Anniversary Premium Box (2019)
