= Misery Days =

Studio album by Oblivion Dust
- Released: July 23, 1998
- Genre: Alternative rock, experimental rock, hard rock
- Length: 54:03
- Language: English
- Label: Cutting Edge (JP)

Oblivion Dust chronology
Looking For Elvis (1997)	Misery Days (1998)	Reborn (1999)

Singles from Misery Days
- 1. "Therapy" Released: March 25, 1998; 2. "Trust" Released: May 20, 1998; 3. "Blurred" Released: January 13, 1999

Misery Days is the second album released by Oblivion Dust on July 23, 1998.

== Track listing ==
No.	Title	Length
1.	"Trust"	3:25
2.	"Therapy"	3:45
3.	"Wrong Decision"	4:47
4.	"Hello"	4:02
5.	"So Real (But I Don't Care)"	5:49
6.	"Blurred"	4:03
7.	"Faces of You"	3:30
8.	"Helium Love"	5:28
9.	"Pure"	3:47
10.	"Sinking"	4:33
11.	"Disappear (All of You)"	5:00
12.	"Future Womb"	5:53
