= Sakura (musician) =

- Also known as: Yutaka Noda; Sakura-Die-Nerima; Suck·D'ark·La
- Born: Yasunori Sakurazawa; November 20, 1969 (age 56)
- Origin: Nerima, Tokyo, Japan
- Genres: Alternative rock; hard rock; pop rock; art rock
- Occupation: Musician
- Instruments: Drums; guitar
- Years active: 1989–present
- Member of: Zigzo
- Formerly of: By-Sex; Creature Creature; Sons of All Pussys; L'Arc-en-Ciel
- Website: sakurazawayasunori.jp

Yasunori Sakurazawa (櫻澤 泰徳, Sakurazawa Yasunori; born November 20, 1969), known by his stage name Sakura, is a Japanese musician. He is best known as former drummer of the rock band L'Arc-en-Ciel from 1993 to 1997. After leaving them he formed the supergroup Zigzo, the trio Sons of All Pussys, and his solo project Lion Heads. Currently Sakura performs with the bands Rayflower, the reformed Zigzo, The Madcap Laughs, and Gibkiy Gibkiy Gibkiy.

== Life and career ==
Sakura was born in Nerima, Tokyo, the youngest of three children. He started taking piano lessons when he was a child. When he was in junior high school he became very interested in rock music, later taking formal music training. Initially he wanted to play guitar but soon changed his mind and devoted himself to percussion.

When Sakura was in high school, he was already playing in the percussion and brass sections for three different school bands. He started working as a roadie for well-known heavy metal band Dead End, when he was eighteen. Soon he began playing drums professionally and joined the visual kei bands Die+Kusse and the Harem Q. The latter released an album entitled Opium in 1991.

It was Dead End's manager who gave L'Arc-en-Ciel bassist Tetsuya Sakura's contact information around December 1992. In 1993, Sakura joined pop rock band L'Arc-en-Ciel. They released their debut album Dune soon afterward. In 1996, their fourth album True, became their first to sell over a million copies. But on February 24, 1997 Sakura was arrested for violating the Stimulants Control Law. In May, he received a two year prison sentence suspended for three years. Sakura officially announced his departure from L'Arc-en-Ciel on November 4, 1997.

In 1999 he started the hard rock supergroup Zigzo with Tetsu and former By-Sexual members Ryo and Den. After achieving moderate commercial success, they disbanded in 2002. That same year, Sakura formed the band Sons of All Pussys with his ex-L'Arc-en-Ciel bandmate Ken. He has also played drums for rock/pop band Tamamizu as support drummer during the first half of 2005. In July 2005 he formed his solo project Lion Heads, where he plays guitar under the alias "Sakura-Die-Nerima".

In summer 2009 Sakura became drummer for Dead End frontman Morrie's solo project Creature Creature. In 2009, he became the drummer for the rock band Rayflower, with Sophia keyboardist Keiichi Miyako. On May 15, 2010, he had his first show with the band Circuit9, in which he drums under the alias "Yutaka Noda" (野田ゆたか, Noda Yutaka). In May 2011, Sakura reunited with Ryo and Den to restart By-Sex. They released a mini-album titled Ago on August 17 and had their first show two days later at the 2011 Chain the Rock Festival. On November 20, 2011, Sakura held a birthday concert at Shibuya O-West. There, after a surprise performance, Zigzo announced that they would officially restart activities at a concert on March 17, 2012 at Akasaka Blitz.

In May 2012, Sakura formed the trio The Madcap Laughs with aie from Deadman and Kiyoshi. Four years later he joined Gibkiy Gibkiy Gibkiy alongside aie, Kazuma (Merry Go Round) and kazu (Kagerou).

Sakura supported Malice Mizer in place of Kami, his former drum protégé who died in 1999, for two 25th anniversary performances on September 8 and 9, 2018. In tribute, he dressed up as Kami and used his original drum kit for the shows.

== Other work ==
Sakura is a Pearl Drums, Sabian Cymbals and Remo drum-heads endorser, and has been giving drumming seminars at clinics since early on in his career. Pearl Instruments Japan released a special Sakura signature drumset model in 2003.

Sakura has authored two books, one called Sakura no Drumworks Quick Reference about drumming; and one part-biography part-fiction book called Sakurazawa no Honki (櫻澤の本気) which gathers the articles published in the magazine Arena 37º, in his column "Sakurazawa no Uwaki" (櫻澤の浮気), during his days in Zigzo. The latter was only available through mail order to customers living in Japan.

== Discography ==
With the Harem Q

- Opium (1991)

With L'Arc~en~Ciel

- Dune (1993)
- Tierra (1994)
- Heavenly (1995)
- True (1996)

With Lion Heads

- Zepetto (ゼペット; 2007)

With Creature Creature

- Inferno (2010)
- Phantoms (2012)

With Rayflower

- Flower Language (2010)
- Narcissus (2014)
- Color & Play (2015)
- Brilliant Anthology (2017)
- Endless Journey (2018)

With Circuit9

- Under the Sun (2011)

With By-Sex

- Ago (2011)

With The Madclap Laughs

- Midnight Love (2014)

With Gibkiy Gibkiy Gibkiy

- Fujouri Shugeki (不条理種劇; 2016)
- In Incontinence (2017)
