= Gekkouka =

Single by Janne Da Arc

from the album JOKER
- Released: January 19, 2005
- Genre: Rock
- Label: Motorod Records

"Gekkouka" (月光花, lit. "Moonlight flower") is the most successful single by the Japanese band Janne Da Arc. It was released on January 19, 2005. The song Gekkouka was featured as the first opening song for the anime series Black Jack. A number two hit on the Japanese Oricon charts, it was the twenty-second best-selling single of 2005.

== Track listing ==
1. "Gekkouka"
2. "WING"
3. "Gekkouka (Blackjack mix)"
