= Acid Black Cherry =

Japanese solo musical project

- Also known as: ABC
- Origin: Hirakata, Osaka
- Genres: Pop rock; alternative rock; progressive rock; hard rock
- Years active: 2007–2017 (on hiatus)
- Label: Motorod
- Members: yasu
- Website: Official Site

Acid Black Cherry (abbreviated as ABC) is the solo project of the former lead vocalist of Janne Da Arc, yasu. The group was formed after Janne Da Arc announced their indefinite hiatus.

== Information ==
Acid Black Cherry is the solo project of Yasunori Hayashi, best known by his stage name "yasu", the former vocalist of Janne Da Arc, formed after Janne Da Arc's hiatus announcement.

After performing several lives throughout fifteen locations nationwide beginning in May 2007, Acid Black Cherry debuted on July 18, 2007 with their single Spell Magic (stylized as SPELL MAGIC). Since their debut, the group has released nineteen singles, five studio albums and four cover albums, all of which peaked in the top five on the Oricon charts.

In 2011, ABC held their FREE LIVE 2011 in commemoration of their fourth anniversary in three locations around Osaka, a temporary parking lot at Chubu Centrair International Airport, an outdoor venue at the Maishima Arena and the Fuji-Q Highland Conifer Forest. While planned to only house a total of 40,000 people, the total number of entries exceeded 160,000.

Their third studio album, 2012 (stylized as 『2012』), released on March 21, 2012, became their first album to reach the number-one spot on the Oricon Albums Charts, selling over 200,000 copies. They would again take the number-one position five years later with their fifth studio album Acid BLOOD Cherry, released on June 21, 2017. Their fifteenth single Yes (イエス) had won first in the annual 2012 USEN Yearly Ranking and, as of October 5, 2018, the YouTube play count exceeds 17 million. It was suspected it was this song that helped give Acid Black Cherry more notoriety.

== Discography ==
=== Albums ===
==== Studio albums ====
Year	Album Information	Oricon Albums Charts	Reported sales
2008	BLACKLIST: Released: February 20, 2008; Label: motored; Formats: CD, CD+DVD (Type A), CD+DVD (Type B)	2	141,000
2009	Q.E.D: Released: August 26, 2009; Label: motored; Formats: CD, CD+DVD (Type A), CD+DVD (Type B)	2	111,000
2012	『2012』: Released: March 21, 2012; Label: motored; Formats: CD, CD+DVD (Music Clip), CD+DVD (Osaka-jo Hall Live)	1	200,000
2015	L -el-: Released: February 25, 2015; Label: motored; Formats: CD, CD+DVD (LIVE Edition), CD+DVD (Documentary Edition)	2	144,000
2017	Acid BLOOD Cherry: Released: June 21, 2017; Label: motored; Formats: CD, CD+DVD	1	

==== Cover albums ====
Year	Album Information	Oricon Albums Charts	Reported sales
2008	Recreation: Released: May 21, 2008; Label: motored; Formats: CD, CD+DVD	3	54,000
2010	Recreation 2: Released: June 30, 2010; Label: motored; Formats: CD, CD+DVD	7	44,000
2013	Recreation 3: Released: March 6, 2013; Label: motored; Formats: CD, CD+DVD	3	77,000
2017	Recreation 4: Released: January 25, 2017; Label: motored; Formats: CD, CD+DVD	5	41,867

=== Singles ===
Single #	Single information	Total sales (estimated)
1st / Debut Single	Spell Magic: Released: July 18, 2007; Oricon Top 20 Weekly Peak: #4; From Album: BLACKLIST	52,000
2nd	Black Cherry: Released: September 26, 2007; Oricon Top 20 Weekly Peak: #2; From Album: BLACKLIST	57,000
3rd	Aishitenai (愛してない / I don't love you): Released: November 28, 2007; Oricon Top 20 Weekly Peak: #2; From Album: BLACKLIST	55,000
4th	Fuyu no Maboroshi (冬の幻 / Winter Phantom): Released: January 16, 2008; Oricon Top 20 Weekly Peak: #2; From Album: BLACKLIST	56,000
5th	20+∞Century Boys: Released: August 26, 2008; Oricon Top 20 Weekly Peak: #4; From Album: Q.E.D	61,000
6th	Jigsaw (ジグソー): Released: November 19, 2008; Oricon Top 20 Weekly Peak: #3; From Album: Q.E.D	56,000
7th	Nemuri Hime (眠り姫 / Sleeping Princess): Released: February 18, 2009; Oricon Top 20 Weekly Peak: #2; From Album: Q.E.D	61,000
8th	Yasashii Uso (優しい嘘 / Kind Lie): Released: July 29, 2009; Oricon Top 20 Weekly Peak: #4; From Album: Q.E.D	49,000
9th	Re:birth: Released: August 18, 2010; Oricon Top 20 Weekly Peak: #2; From Album: 『2012』	65,000
10th	Shoujo no Inori III (少女の祈り / Girl's Prayer): Released: June 8, 2011; Oricon Top 20 Weekly Peak: #4; From Album: 『2012』	50,000
11th	Pistol (ピストル): Released: September 21, 2011; Oricon Top 20 Weekly Peak: #3; From Album: 『2012』	65,000
12th	Shangri-la (シャングリラ): Released: October 19, 2011; Oricon Top 20 Weekly Peak: #5; From Album: 『2012』	68,000
13th	Chou (蝶 / Butterfly): Release Date: November 16, 2011; Oricon Top 20 Weekly Peak: #3; From Album: 『2012』	67,000
14th	Crisis: Release Date: December 21, 2011; Oricon Top 20 Weekly Peak: #3; From Album: 『2012』	67,000
15th	Yes (イエス): Release Date: January 18, 2012; Oricon Top 20 Weekly Peak: #3; From Album: 『2012』	74,000
16th	Greed Greed Greed: Release Date: August 7, 2013; Oricon Top 20 Weekly Peak: #4; From Album:L -el-	81,000
17th	Kuro Neko ~Adult Black Cat~ (黒猫): Release Date: November 20, 2013; Oricon Top 20 Weekly Peak: #3; From Album:L -el-	83,000
18th	Kimi ga Inai, Ano Hi Kara... (君がいない、あの日から... / You're not here, from that day): Release Date: March 11, 2014; Oricon Top 20 Weekly Peak: #2; From Album:L -el-	74,000
19th	Incubus: Release Date: October 22, 2014; Oricon Top 20 Weekly Peak: #2; From Album:L -el-	72,000

== DVD/Blu-ray ==
	Release date	Title	Product number	Peak position	Chart run
1st	August 27, 2008	Acid Black Cherry 2008 tour "BLACK LIST"	AVBD-32111 (DVD)	2	10
2nd	March 24, 2010	Acid Black Cherry 2009 tour “Q.E.D.”	AVBD-32158 (DVD); AVXD-32209 (Blu-ray)	5	9
3rd	January 26, 2011	2010 Live “Re:birth” ～Live at OSAKA-JO HALL～	AVBD-32177/8 (DVD)	64	2
4th	January 26, 2011	2010 Live “Re:birth” ～Live at YOKOHAMA ARENA & OSAKA-JO HALL～	AVBD-32171 (DVD)	5	5
5th	October 17, 2012	Acid Black Cherry TOUR 『2012』	AVBD-32205 (DVD); AVXD-32212 (Blu-ray)	2	16
6th	July 17, 2013	Acid Black Cherry 5th Anniversary Live “Erect”	AVBD-32224 (DVD); AVXD-32226 (Blu-ray)	1	14
7th	February 17, 2016	2015 livehouse tour S -esu-	AVBD-32247 (DVD); AVXD-32248 (Blu-ray)	3	8
8th	March 16, 2016	2015 arena tour L -el-	AVBD-32249/50 (DVD); AVXD-32251 (Blu-ray)	3	11
9th	March 22, 2017	10th Anniversary Live History -BEST-	AVBD-32265/8 (DVD); AVXD-32269 (Blu-ray)	4	15

== Other ==
- jealkb - ROSES (2007.05.16, "D.D.D")
- Karaage!! (2008.02.25, "Fuyu no Maboroshi")
- kiyo - ARTISAN OF PLEASURE (2008.06.25, "Tears")
- 20-nen 200 Kyoku (2008.07.23, "Spell magic")
- 20 Years 200 Hits Complete Best + a Love Hi-Quality CD Edition Box (2009.03.04, "SPELL MAGIC")
- Hayate - Haya! ~Hayauta NON STOP Mega Mix~ (2009.03.11, "20+∞Century Boys")
- Siam Shade Tribute (2010.10.27, "1/3 no Junjou na Kanjou")
- Siam Shade Tribute vs Original (2011.07.27, "1/3 no Junjou na Kanjou")
- Parade II -Respective Tracks of Buck-Tick- (2012.07.04, "Romanesque")
