= Janne Da Arc =

Japanese visual kei rock band

- Also known as: Janne, JDA
- Origin: Osaka, Japan
- Genres: Pop rock; hard rock
- Years active: 1991–2007
- Labels: Cutting Edge; Motorod
- Past members: yasu you ka-yu kiyo shuji
- Website: www.janne.co.jp

Janne Da Arc was a Japanese visual kei rock band, formed in Hirakata, Osaka in 1991. Although inactive since 2007, they officially announced that they had disbanded on April 1, 2019. The band's name is often shortened to "Janne" (ジャンヌ) or "JDA".

== Career ==
The band was signed to the Motorod record label, which is owned by Avex Group. They have released three indie albums, nine major-label albums (including single collections), 26 singles, and 14 DVDs.

On May 9, 2006, they celebrated their tenth anniversary, the date marking when the final member, shuji, became an official member of the band. The band was not named after historical figure Joan of Arc, despite their song "Kyuuseishu (Messiah)" being about her - yasu named the band after a character in the manga Devilman by Go Nagai. A picture of the character can be seen on the art for the band's limited edition Janne Da Arc 10th Anniversary Indies Complete Box, released March 15, 2006.

Their sound is self-described as pop rock, but they played many musical styles such as alternative rock, progressive rock, hard rock and many others. Vocalist yasu takes many musical cues from his musical idol, Motoyuki "Morrie" Ōtsuka of the heavy metal band Dead End. However, the members of Janne Da Arc have proven themselves to be very versatile as well as proficient at their chosen instruments, and are influenced by many bands and musical styles.

As of January 26, 2007, the members of Janne Da Arc are pursuing solo projects, concurrent with their work in the band.

On May 19, 2009, they released a 10th Anniversary Complete Box Set.

On April 1, 2019, Janne Da Arc officially disbanded due to legal matters with their bassist, ka-yu, and health problems of their vocalist, yasu. The announcement was made by agency Uprise Product and elaborated on the circumstances of ka-yu's departure. It noted that during the time the band was preparing for an announcement of a new album and a live tour last September, it had received documents addressed to ka-yu from a law firm. The announcement continued on saying that "if the contents of the document were true," then it represented "acts that went against society and what was right." As a result of these documents, the band decided to cease activity with any projects related to ka-yu.

== Members ==
- yasu (Yasunori Hayashi), vocalist, born January 27, 1975, in Hirakata, Osaka, Japan. Favorite artists include Dead End and Boøwy. yasu also plays the guitar and keyboard, the latter of which he uses to compose most of his music. In 2007 he started his solo project, Acid Black Cherry.
- you (Yutaka Tsuda), guitarist, born July 24, 1974, in Kobe, Japan. Favorite artists include Unicorn and Nuno Bettencourt.
- ka-yu (Kazuyuki Matsumoto), bassist, born January 21, 1975, in Hirakata, Osaka, Japan. Favorite artists include Crazy Cool Joe (Dead End bassist) and Boøwy. ka-yu is characterized by his more visual kei look in comparison to the rest of the band members. In 2010 he has announced the start of a new project called DAMIJAW, starting out with an album on April 28.
- kiyo (Masanobu Kiyose), keyboardist, born June 27, 1974, in Hirakata, Osaka, Japan. Favorite artists include Earth, Wind, and Fire and Keith Emerson.
- shuji (Shuji Suematsu), drummer, born November 21, 1974, in Kobe, Japan. Favorite artists include X Japan and Loudness.

All the members, with the exception of ka-yu, graduated from Hirakata West High School in the same class. For the release of their single Furimukeba..., Janne Da Arc returned to their high school to give a special performance, which became the feature film Hirakata.

== Discography ==
=== Singles ===
- "Red Zone" - March 19, 1999 / June 20, 2001
- "Lunatic Gate" - September 22, 1999
- Eden: Kimi ga Inai (Eden: 君がいない, "Eden: You're Not Here") - January 13, 2000
- "Heaven's Place/Vanity" - April 12, 2000
- Will: Chizu ni nai Basho (Will: 地図にない場所, "Will: A Place Unmapped") - June 26, 2000
- "Mysterious" - November 8, 2000
- "Dry?" - January 31, 2001
- "Neo Venus" - April 25, 2001
- "Seed" - July 25, 2001
- "Sylvia" (シルビア, Shirubia) - October 24, 2001
- "Feel the Wind" - December 12, 2001
- "Shining Ray" - August 7, 2002
- Maria no Tsumeato (マリアの爪痕, "Maria's Scar") - November 20, 2002
- Kasumi Yuku Sora Se ni Shite (霞ゆく空背にして, "Turning My Back on the Misty Sky") - January 16, 2003
- Rainy: Ai no Shirabe (Rainy: 愛の調べ, "Rainy: Song of Love") - May 8, 2003
- Ueta Taiyou (餓えた太陽, "Thirsted Sun") - August 20, 2003
- "Freedom" - March 24, 2004
- "Kiss Me" - April 7, 2004
- "Dolls" - May 19, 2004
- "Romance" - May 26, 2004
- "Black Jack" - June 2, 2004
- "Love is Here" - November 17, 2004
- Gekkouka (月光花, "Moonlight Flower") - January 19, 2005 - No. 2
- "Diamond Virgin" (ダイヤモンドヴァージン, Daiyamondo Vaajin) - May 18, 2005
- Furimukeba (振り向けば…, "If I Turn Around...)/Destination" - February 8, 2006 - No. 2
- "Heaven/Mobius (メビウス, Mebiusu)" - May 10, 2006 - No. 2 Ranked Platinum (selling more than 250,000 copies) by RIAJ in 2008

=== EPs ===
- Dearly - April 17, 1998
- Resist - December 5, 1998
- Chaos Mode - March 17, 1999

=== Albums ===
No.	Information	sales
1st / Debut Album	D・N・A: Released: March 8, 2000; Format: CD5", CD5"+DVD; Oricon Top 200 Weekly peak: No. 11	77,150 copies sold
2nd	Z-Hard: Released: February 28, 2001; Format: CD5", CD5"+DVD; Oricon Top 200 Weekly peak: No. 16	36,830 copies sold
3rd	Gaia: Release Date: January 23, 2002; Format: CD5", CD5"+DVD; Oricon Top 200 Weekly peak: No. 6	71,320 copies sold
4th	Another Story: Release Date: February 13, 2003; Format: CD5", CD5"+DVD; Oricon Top 200 Weekly peak: No. 4	75,639 copies sold
5th	Arcadia: Release Date: July 7, 2004; Format: CD5", CD5"+DVD; Oricon Top 200 Weekly peak: No. 2 (No. 1 on daily chart)	102,484 copies sold
6th	Joker: Release Date: June 15, 2005; Format: CD5", CD5"+DVD; Oricon Top 200 Weekly peak: No. 4	165,349 copies sold

Videos

- 1999 Tour "Chaos Mode" (June 30, 1999)
- 5 Stories <Clips & More> (September 27, 2000)
- Fate or Fortune: Live at Budokan (March 28, 2001)
- Six Clips (March 13, 2002)
- 100th Memorial Live Live Infinity 2002 at Budokan (December 26, 2002)

DVDs

- 1999 Tour "Chaos Mode" (September 27, 2000)
- 5 Stories <Clips & More> (September 27, 2000)
- Fate or Fortune: Live at Budokan (March 28, 2001)
- Six Clips (March 13, 2002)
- 100th Memorial Live: Live Infinity 2002 at Budokan (December 26, 2002)
- Another Story Clips (March 19, 2003)
- Singles Clips (November 12, 2003)
- Danjiri Night (December 25, 2003)
- Arcadia Clips (September 29, 2004)
- Hirakata (February 16, 2005)
- Live 2005 "Dearly" at Osaka-jō Hall 03.27 (March 27, 2005)
- 10th Anniversary Special Live: Osaka Nanba Rockets 2006.5.9 (September 20, 2006)
- Live 2006 Dead or Alive: Saitama Super Arena 05.20 (September 20, 2006)
- Tour Joker 2005 at Budokan (March 25, 2009)

Blu-ray

- Tour Joker 2005 at Budokan (March 25, 2009)

Box sets

- Janne Da Arc 10th Anniversary Indies Complete Box (3CD, 1DVD) (March 15, 2006)
- Janne Da Arc Major Debut 10th Anniversary Complete Box (6CD, 3DVD) (May 19, 2009)
