= The Collection (Sonata Arctica album) =

2006 compilation album by Sonata Arctica

Compilation album by Sonata Arctica
- Released: 15 November 2006
- Recorded: 1999–2005
- Genre: Power metal
- Length: 78:34
- Label: Spinefarm
- Producer: Sonata Arctica

Sonata Arctica chronology
For the Sake of Revenge (2006)	The Collection (2006)	Unia (2007)

The Collection is Sonata Arctica's second compilation album. It was released on 15 November 2006 by Spinefarm Records.

== Track listing ==
All tracks are written by Tony Kakko.

No.	Title	Length
1.	"The Ruins of My Life (Winterheart's Guild)"	5:14
2.	"8th Commandment (Ecliptica)"	3:44
3.	"Don't Say a Word (Single Version) (Reckoning Night)"	4:15
4.	"Victoria's Secret (Winterheart's Guild)"	4:46
5.	"Tallulah (Silence)"	5:23
6.	"Wolf & Raven (Silence)"	4:17
7.	"Black Sheep (Silence)"	3:44
8.	"Broken (Winterheart's Guild)"	5:18
9.	"Kingdom for a Heart (Ecliptica)"	3:53
10.	"FullMoon (Ecliptica)"	5:08
11.	"My Land (2006 re-make) (Ecliptica)"	4:51
12.	"The Cage (Winterheart's Guild)"	4:39
13.	"Last Drop Falls (Silence)"	5:14
14.	"UnOpened (Ecliptica)"	3:43
15.	"San Sebastian (Revisited) (Silence)"	4:37
16.	"Ain't Your Fairytale (Reckoning Night)"	5:17
17.	"Replica (2006 re-make) (Ecliptica)"	4:31
Total length:		78:34

== Track listing: CD 2 (UK special edition) ==
All tracks are written by Tony Kakko.

No.	Title	Length
1.	"Wolf & Raven (Promo video)"
2.	"8th Commandment (Live At Tavastia 2004) (Video)"
3.	"My Land (Live At Tavastia 2004) (Video)"
4.	"Intro (from Songs of Silence – Live in Tokyo)"	1:11
5.	"Weballergy (from Songs of Silence – Live in Tokyo)"	4:25
6.	"Kingdom for a Heart (from Songs of Silence – Live in Tokyo)"	4:10
7.	"Sing in Silence (from Songs of Silence – Live in Tokyo)"	3:49
8.	"False News Travel Fast (from Songs of Silence – Live in Tokyo)"	5:20
9.	"Replica (from Songs of Silence – Live in Tokyo)"	5:13
10.	"My Land (from Songs of Silence – Live in Tokyo)"	5:02
11.	"Black Sheep (from Songs of Silence – Live in Tokyo)"	4:08
12.	"Wolf & Raven (from Songs of Silence – Live in Tokyo)"	6:09
13.	"Bonus: Still Loving You (Scorpions cover) (Studio version)"	4:31
14.	"Bonus: I Want Out (Helloween cover) (Studio version)"	3:50
15.	"Bonus: San Sebastian (Studio version)"	4:44
16.	"Bonus: Shy (Studio version)"	4:16

== Personnel ==
- Tony Kakko – vocals, keyboards
- Jani Liimatainen – guitars
- Marko Paasikoski − bass guitar
- Henrik Klingenberg – keyboards
- Tommy Portimo − drums

== Certifications ==
Region	Certification	Certified units/sales
Finland (Musiikkituottajat)	Gold	22,776
