= Yuji Adachi =

Japanese guitarist (1964–2020)

You
- Promotional photograph of You, circa 2020

Background information
- Also known as: You
- Born: Yuji Adachi (足立祐二); March 10, 1964; Osaka, Japan
- Died: June 16, 2020 (aged 56)
- Genres: Heavy metal, hard rock
- Occupations: Musician, songwriter, music instructor
- Instrument: Guitar
- Years active: 1981–2020
- Formerly of: Dead End, Terra Rosa

Yuji Adachi (Japanese: 足立祐二, Hepburn: Adachi Yūji; March 10, 1964 – June 16, 2020), also known as You, was a Japanese musician, best known as guitarist of the influential heavy metal band Dead End. Before joining Dead End in 1986, he was in the band Terra Rosa, and also ran a guitar school.

== Career ==
You was largely influenced by UFO guitarist Michael Schenker. At 16, he joined his first band Steeler, performing covers of UFO, Rainbow, and Deep Purple. In 1982, You was a member of Terra Rosa and a year later of Jesus, before joining Dead End in 1986. That same year the band released their debut studio album, Dead Line, on the independent record label Night Gallery. You became the main composer of their songs. They released three more major studio albums until 1990, when Dead End disbanded.

You formed the short-lived band Goatcore with Color bassist Marry. He later also worked with Ryuichi Kawamura (from Luna Sea), Nami Tamaki and Cozy Murakami among others and released two solo albums. In 2009, Dead End reunited and released two studio albums.

In 2016, You reunited with his Terra Rosa bandmates Kazue Akao and Masashi "Jill" Okagaki to perform a limited-time tour, supported by Animetal bassist Masaki and former Galneryus drummer Jun-ichi Satoh. They only performed older songs at the three shows, with the exception of one new composition by You. A live album from the tour, Terra Rosa Live from Coda, was released in 2017. You released his fourth solo album Andromedia on March 13, 2019. The instrumental album features The Yellow Monkey member Eiji "Annie" Kikuchi on drums and Atsushi Hasegawa of Ded Chaplin on bass. That same day, a remastered version of Jesus' demo tape Le Dernier Slow was released. In addition to bonus live tracks, it also includes a new recording of "Sahara", which You had written just as he left the band decades earlier at age 19. Youcoustic, the guitarist's first acoustic album, was released on March 18, 2020.

You performed live with Hasegawa and drummer Tetsuya Hoshiyama on June 14, 2020, for an audience-less concert that was streamed online. On June 19, 2020, Dead End announced that You had died from sepsis on June 16, aged 56. On August 9, Tokyo FM aired a special memorial program to You hosted by Ryuichi Kawamura and featuring guests such as his Dead End bandmates, Eiji Kikuchi and music critics. Sugizo, who cites You as one of his guitar influences, included a cover of Dead End's "So Sweet So Lonely" on his December 2020 album Love & Tranquility as a tribute to You. Morrie held a concert in You's memory on the first anniversary of his death, where the singer reminisced and talked about his former bandmate in addition to performing. He covered You's solo song "Immoral", after writing lyrics to go with the instrumental. A memorial concert for You was held at Spotify O-East on June 16, 2022. In addition to a Dead End session featuring Morrie and Sugizo, a group featuring members of Terra Rosa performed in addition to several others.

== Discography ==
=== Albums ===
- Psychical Island (September 21, 1990)
- You's Alien (August 24, 2005)
- Maniac Love Station (April 3, 2013) Oricon Albums Chart: 192
- Andromedia (March 13, 2019) 93
- Youcoustic (March 18, 2020) 150

== Guitars ==
You had about 50 guitars at home, and more than 100 guitar effects. He had a signature model with Fernandes Guitars, the NTG-YOU "Marin-chan." (まりんちゃん。). He also had the ST "YOU" MODEL Type-III with the brand Freedom.
