= Morrie (musician) =

Japanese musician (born 1964)

- Born: Motoyuki Ōtsuka; March 4, 1964 (age 62); Tatsuno, Hyōgo, Japan
- Genres: Rock; heavy metal
- Occupations: Singer-songwriter; musician
- Instruments: Vocals; guitar
- Years active: 1984–1995; 2005–present
- Label: BMG Japan
- Formerly of: Dead End Creature Creature
- Website: morrie.jp

Motoyuki Ōtsuka (Japanese: 大塚基之, Hepburn: Ōtsuka Motoyuki; born March 4, 1964, in Tatsuno, Hyōgo), known mononymously as Morrie, is a Japanese singer-songwriter. He is best known as vocalist and co-founder of the influential heavy metal band Dead End, active from 1984 to 1990, and Morrie's distinctive visual appearance and rough vocal style inspired many later prominent musicians in Japan's visual kei movement. When they disbanded, he began a solo career for five years, before moving to New York City and going into hiatus. He reemerged in 2005 with the solo project Creature Creature, which utilizes several well-known Japanese musicians, reunited with Dead End four years later, and released his first solo album in twenty years in 2015.

== History ==
=== 1984–1995: Dead End and solo career ===
In December 1984, Morrie formed Dead End alongside his fellow former-Liar bandmate, Takahiro Kagawa, Tadashi Masumoto ("Crazy Cool Joe") and Masaaki Tano. Only he and Joe remained, and until the 1987 were joined by Yuji Adachi ("You") and Masafumi Minato, just before they signed a major contract with Victor Entertainment. Although achieved only limited commercial success in their homeland until January 1990, they managed to have a contract with an American label with their songs and videos aired on MTV and radio stations. Morrie's distinctive visual appearance and rough vocal style inspired many later prominent musicians in Japan's visual kei movement.

In 1990, Morrie started a solo career and gradually went to live in New York City. He went there because was interested, besides the Avant-garde music scene, in the production work by Roli Mosimann on Infected and Mind Bomb by The The. Ultimately, Mosimann would produce all three Morrie's studio albums. His first release was the single "Paradox" on October 21, 1990, and exactly one month later his debut solo album "Ignorance" was published. In the upcoming five years, he released a few more singles (second "Shisen no Kairaku" featured cover of "In My Room" by The Walker Brothers) and two more studio albums, Romantic na, Amari ni Romantic na in 1992 and Kage no Kyoen in 1995, before seemingly withdrawing from the public eye for almost ten years.

=== 2005–2012: Return to music and Creature Creature ===
In 2005, Morrie's solo best of album Ectoplasm was released and marked his return to music. At the end of the year he announced the formation of his rock band Creature Creature, that included bassist Tetsuya (from L'Arc-en-Ciel), guitarist Minoru Kojima (from The Mad Capsule Markets), and drummer Shinya Yamada (from Luna Sea). They performed at the year-end event Danger IV at Nippon Budokan as a secret musical act. In 2006, three singles were released on the same day of July, and on August 30 their debut studio album Light&Lust was released on Danger Crue Records. During the album's recording, Morrie was joined by Dead End members You, Minato and Joe, and their producer Hajime Okano, who each contributed to several songs. Morrie said it was a moving moment for him, and said about the meeting that "I was curious what kind of musician and persons they became. After they played I started thinking that a Dead End reunion would be extraordinary". The band performed only two times that year, at the next Danger V event and the held Light&Lust concert at Shibuya-AX in December.

It was quiet for another two years, until June 2009, when two Creature Creature concerts in Tokyo and Osaka were held starting the Simone and the Wrath tour series, but with different a line-up, featuring guitarist Hiro (from La'cryma Christi), guitarist Shinobu (from Guy's Family), bassist Hitoki (from Kuroyume), and drummer Sakura (from L'Arc-en-Ciel). In August, Morrie and the other Dead End members reunite, and held a their first concert in almost twenty years. In November they released their new album and did not stop with activity in upcoming years. In December, with Creature Creature, Morrie held two concerts in Shanghai, China, and performed at the Jack in the Box and Beat Shuffle events at Nippon Budokan and Omiya Sonic City respectively.

On July 21, 2010, Creature Creature's second studio album Inferno was released and throughout this and next year they held the smaller Purgatory, Inferno, and Paradise tours. The single "Psyche Telos" was released on June 12, 2011, by Psyche Records, a record label owned by Morrie. In September they went on the Exorcising Orpheus tour, and released a live concert video of the same name recorded at the Paradise tour finale. In June and August 2012, the singles "Rakuen/Ataraxia" and "Kurumeki/Sexus", as well as the Sodom and Gomorah tour, were followed by the release on October 17 of the band's third studio album Phantoms.

=== 2012–present: Renewed solo career ===
In 2012, Morrie performed his first solo live concert in twenty years. Extasis was held on his birthday, where he performed old and new songs. The following year he held The Nostalgia of the Infinite birthday and two Nowhere Nobody concerts. For his fiftieth anniversary in 2014, Morrie held his third consecutive birthday concert, Now I Here Eternity, with Sugizo, Kiyoharu, You and Joe as special guests. The Boys of the Flesh concert followed in May. On December 25, 2014, Morrie pre-released his fourth studio album Hard Core Reveire, his first in nearly twenty years. It received a general release on January 21, 2015, via Morrie's own indie label Nowhere Music. The album's music is uniquely experimental, while the concept is that reality is a dream, a hardcore illusion of waking up. On March 4, a book commemorating Morrie's 50th birthday was released in a limited amount of 500 copies. Titled Book of M: From Nowhere To Nowhere and based on the concept "from birth to death", it was accompanied by a 25-minute long DVD. Over the years he continued to perform his Solitude one-man solo shows.

Morrie is featured on three songs from Aoki Yutaka's album Lost in Forest, and one song, for which he also contributed lyrics, to the album Oneness M by Sugizo. On March 15, 2017, Creature Creature's released their fourth studio album Death is a Flower, and the band held the second part of its tour between December 2016 and March 2017. Because they felt they had "come full circle" conceptually with Death is a Flower, and because Morrie wanted to focus on his solo activities, Creature Creature went on hiatus after July 8, 2018.

On August 27, 2017, Morrie performed an intimate solo show at Kraine Theater in New York City. It was his first official solo live performance outside Japan. He reprised the performance at Kraine Theater on January 31, 2018, a third performance on August 26 was part of his solo tour Morrie the Universe "Solitude" Season 6 which began in September. On April 19, 2019, his fifth studio album In The Shining Wilderness was released, followed by a solo tour with a band in February and March, and then his 7th solo Solitude tour series until December 2019. On September 7, 2022, Morrie released his sixth studio album Ballad D, a "self-cover" album of Dead End songs, featuring Sugizo, Sakito and Heather Paauwe.

In 2024, Morrie formed the duo Godland with former Gastunk vocalist Baki. Their support band consisted of Minato, Sugizo, and Thee Michelle Gun Elephant bassist Koji Ueno. Morrie had originally asked X Japan's Heath to play bass for the duo, but he declined as he was undergoing treatment for an unspecified illness. Morrie celebrated his 60th birthday by holding the Flesh Fate Festival at Ex Theater Roppongi on March 2, 2024. The event featured many guests and was split into four different sections covering the singer's career: Ballad D, Morrie Solo Band, Godland, and Dead End. Godland released their self-titled first album on April 15, 2026. The duo supported it with a short tour, which featured Janne Da Arc's Shuji on drums.

== Musical style and lyrics ==
Morrie's lyrics throughout his career were inspired by philosophical questions about the human being, I, good and evil, justice, truth, beauty, as well those people who devoted their lives trying to solve them. Compared to Dead End, in Creature Creature, he freely explores his ideas with other musicians and the creation is "more centripetal with lyrical content evoked by philosophical questions of being and what is I". In the classical music he is especially fond of Richard Wagner and Johann Sebastian Bach.

== Creature Creature support members ==
Morrie's backing band for Creature Creature:

Name	Instrument	Live support period	Studio appearances
Minoru	Guitar	December 2005 – December 2006	Light & Lust, Inferno
Hiro (La'cryma Christi)	Guitar	December 2006 – July 2018	Inferno, Phantoms, Death is a Flower
Shinobu (The Legendary Six Nine)	Guitar	June 2009 – July 2018	Inferno, Phantoms, Death is a Flower
Tetsuya	Bass guitar	December 2005	Light & Lust
Hitoki (Kuroyume)	Bass guitar	December 2006 – July 2018	Inferno, Phantoms, Death is a Flower
Takumi "Fire" Matsuda (Dt.)	Bass guitar	December 28, 2006	
Shinya	Drums	December 2006	Light & Lust
Sakura	Drums	June 2009 – August 2012	Inferno, Phantoms
Hiroshi Sasabuchi (Plastic Tree)	Drums	October 2012 – July 2018	Phantoms, Death is a Flower

== Discography ==
=== Solo work ===
Studio albums

- Ignorance (November 21, 1990)
- Romantic na, Amari ni Romantic na (ロマンティックな、余りにロマンティックな; April 21, 1992)
- Kage no Kyoen (影の饗宴; January 21, 1995)
- Hard Core Reverie (January 21, 2015) Oricon #252
- In the Shining Wilderness (光る曠野; April 19, 2019)
- Ballad D (September 7, 2022) Oricon #35 Billboard Japan Top Albums #30

Compilation albums

- Ectoplasm (April 20, 2005)

Singles

- "Paradox" (パラドックス; October 21, 1990)
- "Shisen no Kairaku" (視線の快楽; November 21, 1991)
- "Sayonara, Toriaezu" (さよなら、とりあえず; August 21, 1993)
- "Barairo ni Somaru" (薔薇色に染まる; December 16, 1993)
- "Inu" (犬; January 21, 1995)

=== Creature Creature ===
Albums

- Light&Lust (August 30, 2006) Oricon #15
- Inferno (July 21, 2010) Oricon #40
- Phantoms (October 17, 2012) Oricon #51
- Death is a Flower (March 15, 2017) Oricon #144

Singles

- "Paradise" (パラダイス; July 19, 2006) Oricon #29
- "Red" (July 19, 2006) Oricon #27
- "Kaze no Tou" (風の塔; July 19, 2006) Oricon #26
- "Psychetelos" (June 12, 2011)
- "Rakuen/Ataraxia" (楽園へ / Ataraxia; June 20, 2012) Oricon #89
- "Kurumeki/Sexus" (くるめき / Sexus; August 8, 2012) Oricon #139

DVDs

- Exorcising Orpheus: Paradise Tour Final (October 20, 2011) Oricon #185
- Beyond Light & Lust (April 23, 2020)

== Notes ==
a. Ōtsuka's surname is sometimes also spelled as Otsuka, Ohtsuka.
