= Rikiji =

Japanese musician

Rikiji Masuda (増田 力司, Masuda Rikiji; born January 11, 1971 in Saitama) is a Japanese musician and bassist. He is known for his work with Oblivion Dust and Mega8Ball.

His musical career started as the bassist of Three Eyes Jack from 1989 to 1995, under the nickname "ChaChaMaru" (ちゃちゃ丸). In fall 1995 Rikiji formed Mega8Ball with vocalist/guitarist Tetsu Takano. The band later disbanded and had their last live performance on December 29, 1997.

In January 1998, almost immediately after, he joined Oblivion Dust. Then on December 23, 2000, Rikiji left Oblivion Dust, who later disband in September 2001. In early 2001 he reformed Mega8Ball, being the only original member. Oblivion Dust and Rikiji reunited in September 2007.
