= By-Sexual =

Japanese visual kei punk rock band

- By-Sexual in 1990; Clockwise from top: Ryo, Den, Sho, Nao

Background information
- Also known as: By-Sex, Alzheimer
- Origin: Osaka, Japan
- Genres: By-Sexual: Punk rock; pop punk; new wave; By-Sex: Pop punk; alternative rock
- Years active: By-Sexual: 1988–1995, 2011, 2016, 2017; By-Sex: 1996–1998, 2011
- Labels: Free-Will; Pony Canyon (By-Sexual); Noir (By-Sex)
- Members: Sho; Ryo; Den; Nao
- Past members: Sakura

By-Sexual (stylized as BY-SEXUAL) was a Japanese visual kei punk rock band from Osaka. They were active from 1988 to 1995, when vocalist Sho left the band and they went on hiatus. In August 1996, the remaining members restarted the group under the name By-Sex (stylized as BY-SEX) with Ryo taking over vocals in addition to guitar. In February 1998, Nao left and the group disbanded.

On September 3, 2011, By-Sexual reunited for a show at Shinagawa Stellar for the victims of the 2011 Tōhoku earthquake and tsunami. Around the same time, Ryo and bassist Den teamed up with their Zigzo bandmate Sakura to perform as By-Sex. The four reunited again for the October 14, 2016 Visual Japan Summit at Makuhari Messe and Chain the Rock Festival on August 26, 2017.

== History ==
By-Sexual was formed in April 1988 in Osaka. That year they released the demo "Bad Boy Blues" on Free-Will records. They signed to Pony Canyon and in February 1990 they released their major debut, "So Bad Boy". Their first album Culture Shock followed in April. It reached number 6 on the Oricon chart and was named one of the top albums from 1989 to 1998 in a 2004 issue of the music magazine Band Yarouze.

Their song "Bakumatsu Junjoden" was used as the theme song for the 1991 movie of the same name starring Riho Makise and sold over 100,000 copies.

In January 1995, vocalist Sho left the band and they went on hiatus. However the remaining members continued to play together under the name Alzheimer. In August 1996, they restarted the group under the name By-Sex with Ryo changing to vocals and guitar. In February 1998, Nao left and the group disbanded.

Sho made an attempt at a solo career, but soon changed to managing bands before retiring from the music industry altogether. Both Ryo and Den went on to form the bands Zigzo, Pt. (Platinum), and are currently in Test-No.. Nao joined Nitro (now known as Food), Nakata Band (who later changed their name to The Heavenly Curve) with Zi:Kill bassist Seiichi, and Badub. Den and Nao were both support members for Machine (duo of Penicillin's Hakuei and Spread Beaver's Kiyoshi).

On May 9, 2011, it was announced via Nao's Twitter and Den's blog that By-Sexual would reunite for one night. All proceeds were donated to the Japanese Red Cross for the victims of the 2011 Tōhoku earthquake and tsunami. By-Sexual's first concert in sixteen years was held on September 3 at Shinagawa Stellar to an audience of 2,000. Around the same time, Ryo and Den teamed up with their Zigzo bandmate Sakura to restart By-Sex. They released a mini-album titled Ago on August 17 and had their first show two days later at the 2011 Chain the Rock Festival.

In 2014, Ryo and Sho performed an acoustic set together at that year's Chain the Rock Festival on August 30.

By-Sexual reunited once again to perform on the first day of the Visual Japan Summit on October 14, 2016, at Makuhari Messe. They were joined by Hisashi of Glay for "Be Free".

The band will perform at the second night of the 10th anniversary Chain the Rock Festival on August 26, 2017.

== Members ==
By-Sexual

- Sho Yamanoi – vocals (1988–1995, 2011, 2016, 2017)
- Ryoji "Ryo" Okamoto – guitar (1988–1995, 2011, 2016, 2017), (Zigzo, Pt., Test-No.)
- Hiroyuki "Den" Onishi – bass (1988–1995, 2011, 2016, 2017), (Sister's No Future, Zigzo, Pt., Test-No.)
- Naoyuki "Nao" Fujimoto – drums (1988–1995, 2011, 2016, 2017), (Nitro/Food, Nakata Band/The Heavenly Curve, Badub)

By-Sex

- Ryoji "Ryo" Okamoto – vocals, guitar (1996–1998, 2011)
- Hiroyuki "Den" Onishi – bass (1996–1998, 2011)
- Naoyuki "Nao" Fujimoto – drums (1996–1998)
- Yasunori "Sakura" Sakurazawa – drums (2011), (L'Arc~en~Ciel, Zigzo, Sons of All Pussys, Lion Heads, Rayflower)

== Discography ==
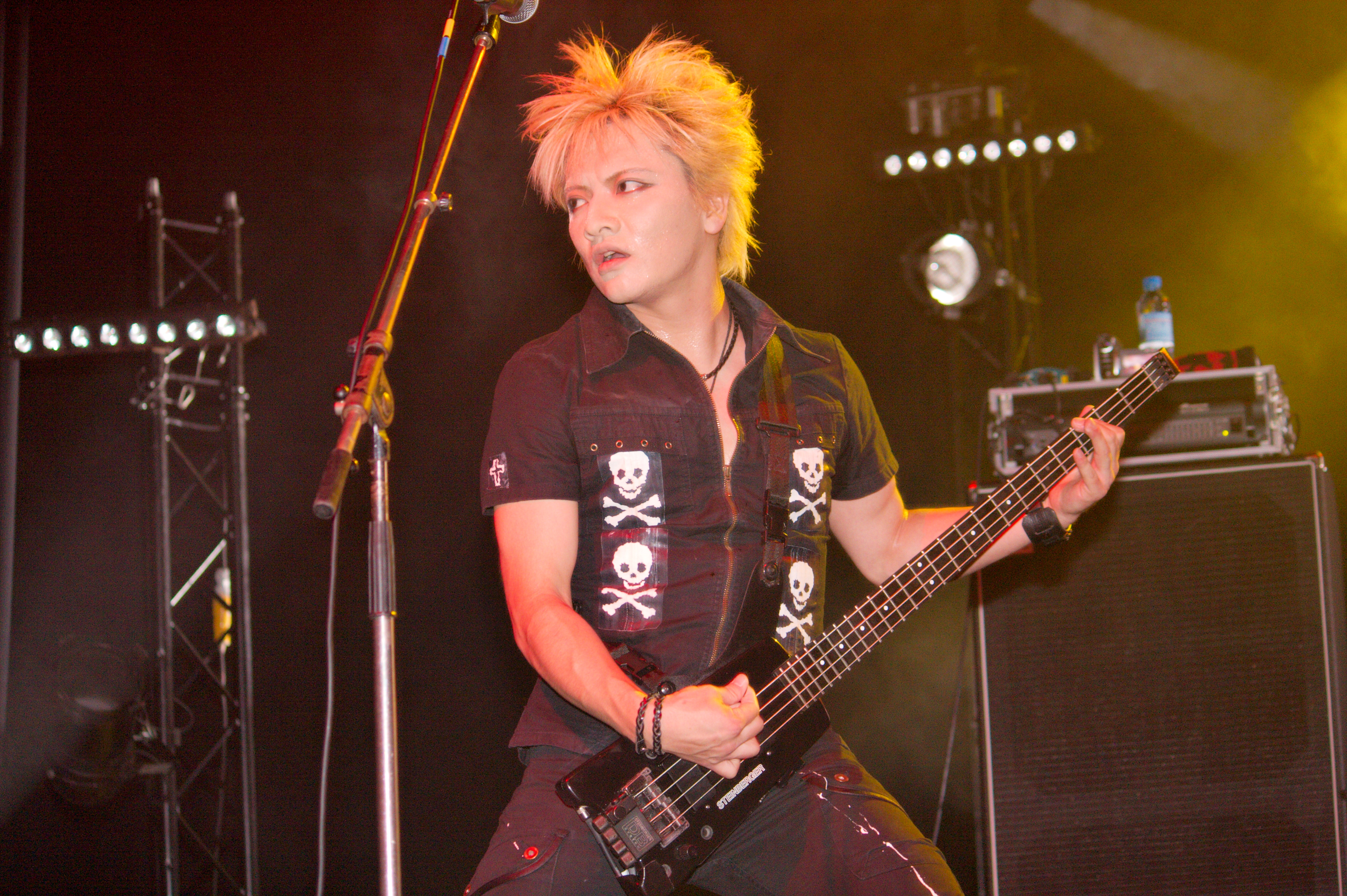
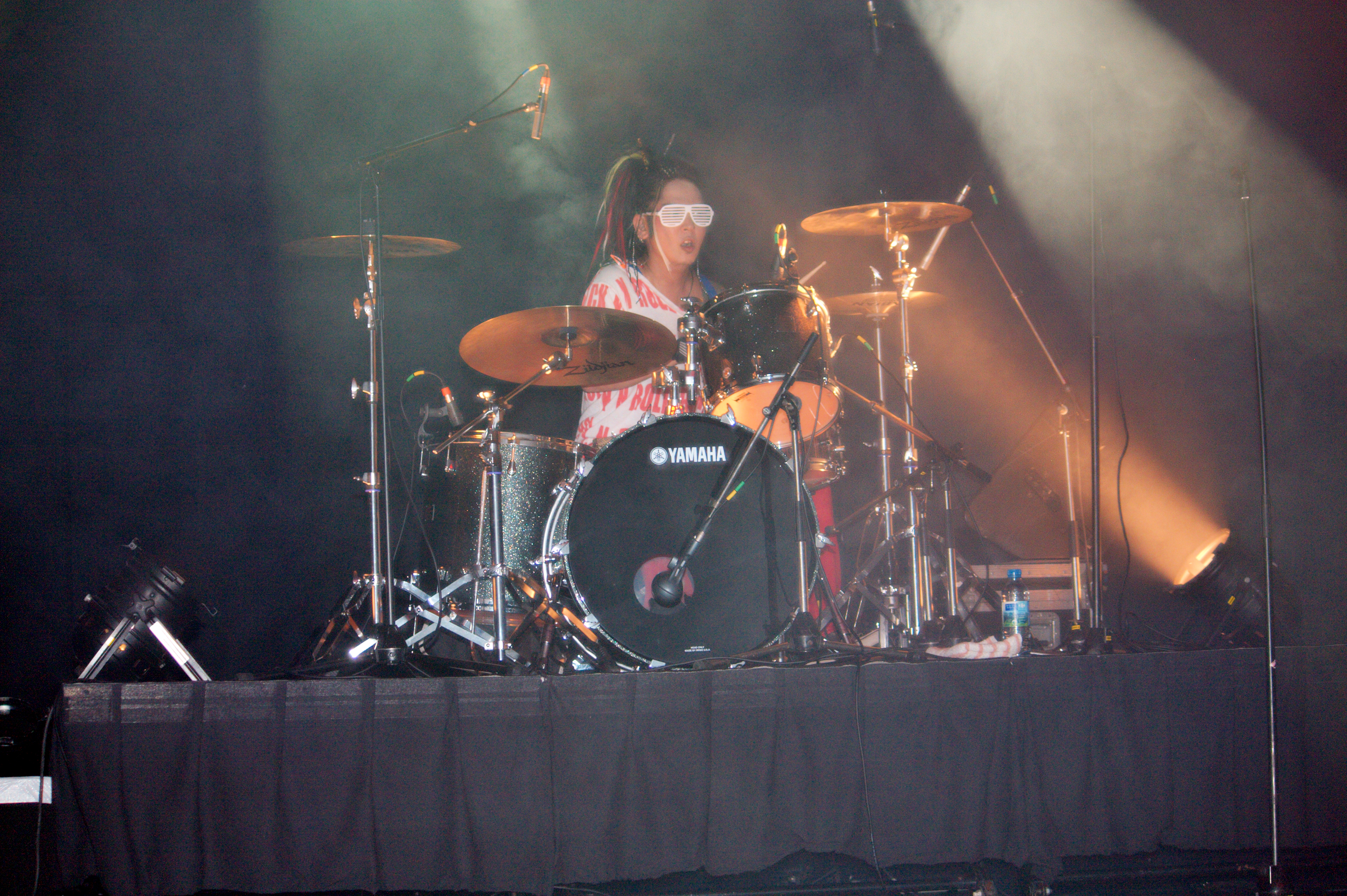
Den and Nao performing with Machine in 2008.

=== As By-Sexual ===
Studio albums

- Culture Shock (April 21, 1990) Oricon Albums Chart Peak Position: No. 6
- Sexuality (November 14, 1990) No. 5
- Cracker (October 9, 1991) No. 5
- 4D Pocket (September 18, 1992) No. 9
- Coupling Party (November 20, 1992) No. 14
- Young Spirits (June 2, 1993) No. 21
- 94 Love (April 6, 1994) No. 21
- Cool (November 18, 1994) No. 40

Compilation albums

- Album (April 5, 1995) No. 34
- Anthology By-Sexual Best (December 18, 2002)
- Platinum Best (July 19, 2017) No. 256

Singles

- "So Bad Boy" (February 21, 1990), Oricon Singles Chart Peak Position: 16
- "Be Free" (March 21, 1990) No. 14
- "Get, Start, Don't Stop, Go Go!" (July 25, 1990) No. 12
- "Flapper" (October 24, 1990) No. 8
- "Dynamite Girl" (April 24, 1991) No. 14
- "Bakumatsu Junjoden/Okita Sousi wa B Cup" (幕末純情伝／沖田総司はBカップ; June 21, 1991) No. 12
- "Hysteric" (September 21, 1991) No. 12
- "Hurry Up! Let It Go!" (January 1, 1992) No. 20
- "Deep Kiss" (September 18, 1992) No. 25
- "Thank You for Smile" (May 21, 1993) No. 56
- "Media Junky" (September 17, 1993) No. 43
- "Romantic" (March 18, 1994) No. 56
- "Cool Heart" (October 21, 1994) No. 66

Demo

- "Bad Boy Blues" (1988)

Home videos

- Film By-Sexual 1 (September 21, 1999)
- Film By-Sexual 2 ~Live in Shibuya Kokaido~ (January 1, 1991)
- Film By-Sexual 3 (November 21, 1991)
- Film By-Sexual 4 ~Cracker Shop 24h~ (April 1, 1992)
- Film By-Sexual 5 (April 28, 1994)
- By-Sexual MVP '90-'94 Music Video Parade (May 20, 1994)
- Film By-Sexual 6 ~Live at the Hibiya Music Stadium~ (January 20, 1995)

Books

- Penalty Area (June 1991)
- In and Out of By-Sexual Kaizoku Ban (In and Out of BY-SEXUAL 海賊版; December 1991)
- Kongetsu no By-Chan!! (今月のばいちゃん！！; September 1993)

=== As By-Sex ===
- Ago (August 17, 2011)
