= Oblivion Dust =

Japanese rock band

- Origin: Japan
- Genres: Alternative rock; post-grunge; industrial rock; hard rock
- Years active: 1996–2001, 2007–present
- Labels: Cutting Edge, Motorod/Avex Trax, Nayutawave, Virgin
- Members: Ken Lloyd; K.A.Z; Rikiji
- Past members: Derek Forbes; Matt Garrett; Taka; Furuton; Masaru
- Website: obliviondust.net

Oblivion Dust is a Japanese rock band first active from 1996 to 2001; they reunited in 2007. Although they were originally largely influenced by early 1990s American grunge bands, since reuniting their music has become straight alternative rock. They stand out in the Japanese scene as most of their songs are written and sung in fluent English.

== History ==
=== 1996–2001: Formation and disbandment ===
In May 1995 the band Addict of the Trip Minds stopped activities due to differences in the direction of the band. The drummer Taka Motomura (who played on the self-titled album Addict of the Trip Minds in 1994) and the bassist Derek Forbes (who had joined the band a short while ago) decided to form a new band and take a "western style". In late 1995 they recruited Kazuhito "K.A.Z" Iwaike as lead guitarist and in early 1996 recruited Ken Lloyd as vocalist and (in the beginning) guitarist. They started to make songs and went to Los Angeles to record their first album (not released until the following year) with Ray McVeigh (The Professionals, Zilch, Wild Crash 500, etc.) as producer (he would also be the producer of their second and third album). However, once recording of the album was completed Derek Forbes dropped out of the band and was replaced on bass by Koozie "Jer Koozie" Johns as support member in a few shows from mid 1996 until the end of that year. Then he left the band and was replaced by Matt Garrett as an official member.

Soon after, thanks to the help and support of hide, they signed with alternative label Cutting Edge, a label owned by the Avex Group. The name of the band was changed to Oblivion Dust in September 1996, with their debut under this name in November 1996.

In January 1997, they released their first single, "Sucker". In March they released their second single, "Numb". In April the group toured the West Coast of the United States with a series of ten concerts. In May, they released one more single, and in June they released their first full-length album entitled Looking for Elvis. In July, they returned to the West Coast of the US to play ten more concerts, and Matt Garrett left the band. In September they had their first Japanese tour, consisting of a total of 11 shows and five extra shows in October.

In January 1998, a new bassist joined the band as official member: Rikiji Masuda. That same month they played as the opening band for the UK electronic group, The Prodigy, in Tokyo before a crowd of 10.000 fans, gaining a name for themselves. 1998 also saw the release of two singles and their second album, Misery Days. Between both singles, they toured the West Coast of the United States again in April. For the rest of year they toured Japan. In November 1998, Souta "Furuton" Oofuruton replaced Taka Motomura, who left around August.

In 1999 Oblivion Dust released four new singles, another new album called Reborn and their first video, "Overdose". They toured all year long, playing with other well known bands such as Marilyn Manson and Zilch. In September their official fan club, Embryo, was temporarily opened, and December saw the opening of their official website.

The band began 2000 with a nationwide Reborn tour. In February their fan club was officially opened. In May their new song entitled "S.O.S." appeared on the Japanese version of the Mission: Impossible 2 soundtrack. In the same year, the band played numerous sold-out gigs; they also played at the Summer Sonic Festival, and released two singles, a new album called Butterfly Head and their second video. The gig performed on December 23 at the Tokyo Bay NK Hall turned out to be Rikiji's last, as he decided to quit the band soon after.

In January 2001, their support guitarist since September 1998, Masaru "May" Yoshida, gained the status of an official member, and the band was joined by a new bassist Ju-ken, as a support member. The members didn't enjoy their new roles for long, because only a few months later, on June 30, Oblivion Dust announced that they would officially disband. The last release was the compilation album entitled Radio Songs ~ Best of Oblivion Dust, which came out two months later. Finally the group held their last two concerts on September 22 and 23, titled "Last Two Nights Thank You & Good Bye".

=== 2007–present: Reunited ===
On June 28, 2007 it was announced that Ken, K.A.Z and Rikiji had decided to get back together, playing two concerts called "Resurrected" on September 8 and 9. On November 7, it was announced that they would release three digital downloads in three weeks before the release of their new album in stores on January 23, 2008. This self-titled album was available in a regular edition and a limited edition that came with a DVD with the full performance of the September 9 gig and the "Never Ending" music video.

Early in 2008, Oblivion Dust had a short tour to signify their reformation. They then performed at the second night of the hide memorial summit on May 4, alongside X Japan, Luna Sea, and others. There they performed their cover of hide's song "Genkai Haretsu", which they had previously recorded for the 1998 tribute album Tribute Spirits.

In mid-2008, the band released the single "Girl in Mono/Bed of Roses" and announced an album for early 2009. However, in early 2009 it was announced that the album was delayed, because the members didn't have enough time due to their side projects.

In late 2010, the band announced Ashes to Dust 2011. The two shows were held at Shibuya-AX on February 18 and 19. On March 1, 2011 the band's official fan club Overdose was renewed. They went on their first nationwide tour in three years, titled Re-Creation Tour 2011, starting on June 11 and ending on July 18. The last gig was broadcast on Ustream, and was watched by over 8,000 people around the world. Oblivion Dust released their first material in over three years, the digital single "Tune", on December 14, 2011. Their sixth studio album, 9 Gates for Bipolar, followed on April 11, 2012. Their first release after signing to Nayutawave Records, a sub-label of Universal Music Japan, it includes the song "Sail Away" which features K.A.Z's former Spin Aqua bandmate Anna Tsuchiya. Three days later the band embarked on another nationwide tour, titled Static Sound Tour 2012.

== Members ==
- Kentaro "Ken" Lloyd – vocals (1996–2001, 2007–present)
- Kazuhito "K.A.Z" Iwaike – guitar (1995–2001, 2007–present)
- Rikiji Masuda – bass (1998–2000, 2007–present)

Support members

- Yuji – guitar (2011–present; guitarist of Rikiji's band Mega8Ball)
- Arimatsu – drums (2011–present; has collaborated with several bands/artists such as Vamps and Anna Tsuchiya)

Former members

- Derek Forbes – bass (1995–1996)
- Matt Garrett – bass (1997)
- Taka Motomura – drums (1995–1998)
- Souta "Furuton" Oofuruton – drums (1998–2001)
- Masaru "May" Yoshida – guitar (2001, support member 1998–2000)

Former support members

- Koozie "Jer Koozie" Johns – bass (some shows in 1996)
- Josh Lazie – bass (1997)
- Ju-ken – bass (2001)
- Masuo – drums (2007–2008; has collaborated with several bands/artists such as J and Ken's band Fake?)
- Pablo – guitar (2007–2011; began in the band Giraffe, which disbanded in 1999, then became a support guitarist for Ken's band Fake? and for Takui Nakajima. He is currently in the hard rock outfit out of LA/Tokyo, Pay Money to My Pain.)

== Discography ==
Albums

- Looking for Elvis (June 25, 1997)
- Misery Days (July 23, 1998)
- Reborn (December 26, 1999), Oricon Albums Chart peak position: No. 69
- Butterfly Head (November 22, 2000) No. 50
- Oblivion Dust (January 23, 2008) No. 59
- 9 Gates for Bipolar (April 11, 2012) No. 54
- Dirt (July 20, 2016, mini-album) No. 49
- Shadows (November 1, 2022, mini-album) Oricon Digital Albums Chart peak position: No. 19

Singles

- "Sucker" (January 22, 1997)
- "Numb" (March 26, 1997)
- "Falling" (May 20, 1997)
- "Therapy" (March 25, 1998)
- "Trust" (May 20, 1998)
- "Blurred" (January 13, 1999, two editions)
- "You" (March 25, 1999), Oricon Singles Chart peak position: No. 68
- "Goodbye" (October 27, 1999) No. 65
- "Crazy" (December 26, 1999) No. 79
- "Forever" (July 12, 2000) No. 60
- "Designer Fetus" (September 27, 2000) No. 35
- "Girl in Mono/Bed of Roses" (August 27, 2008) No. 86

Digital singles

- "Haze" (December 26, 2007)
- "When You Say" (January 2, 2008)
- "Never Ending" (January 9, 2008)
- "Tune" (December 14, 2011)
- "Swarm" (May 31, 2024)

Compilations

- Radio Songs ~ Best of Oblivion Dust (August 8, 2001) No. 46
- Single Collection (December 27, 2001, Box set: 11 single CDs + 1 live CD)

Other appearances

- Tribute Spirits (May 1, 1999, Track 12 "Genkai Haretsu")
- Mission: Impossible II Soundtrack (May 31, 2000, Track 18 "S.O.S")

VHS & DVDs

- Overdose (October 27, 1999, VHS, live concert)
- Overdose (March 27, 2000, DVD, live concert)
- Oblivion Dust - The Video (July 12, 2000, VHS, music videos)
- Oblivion Dust - The DVD (September 19, 2001, DVD, music videos)

Limited items

- Video Therapy (VHS for those who attended their concert at Hibiya on April 3, 1999)
- Dear Embryo (CD for their fan club in September 1999)
- Free Sample Edit (mini disc with six songs for those who bought the single "Forever" on July 12, 2000)
- Forever -English Version- (CD for those who attended their concert at Tokyo Bay NK Hall on December 23, 2000)
- Oblivion Dust Last Two Nights "Thank You & Goodbye" (VHS sold out to those who requested it in late 2001)
- Sail Away (Ken Lloyd version) (exclusive at iTunes Japan from April 11, 2012)
- Roads to Oblivion (November 26, 2014), Oricon DVDs Chart peak position: No. 38
