= Shibuya-AX =

Concert hall in Shibuya, Tokyo, Japan

SHIBUYA-AX
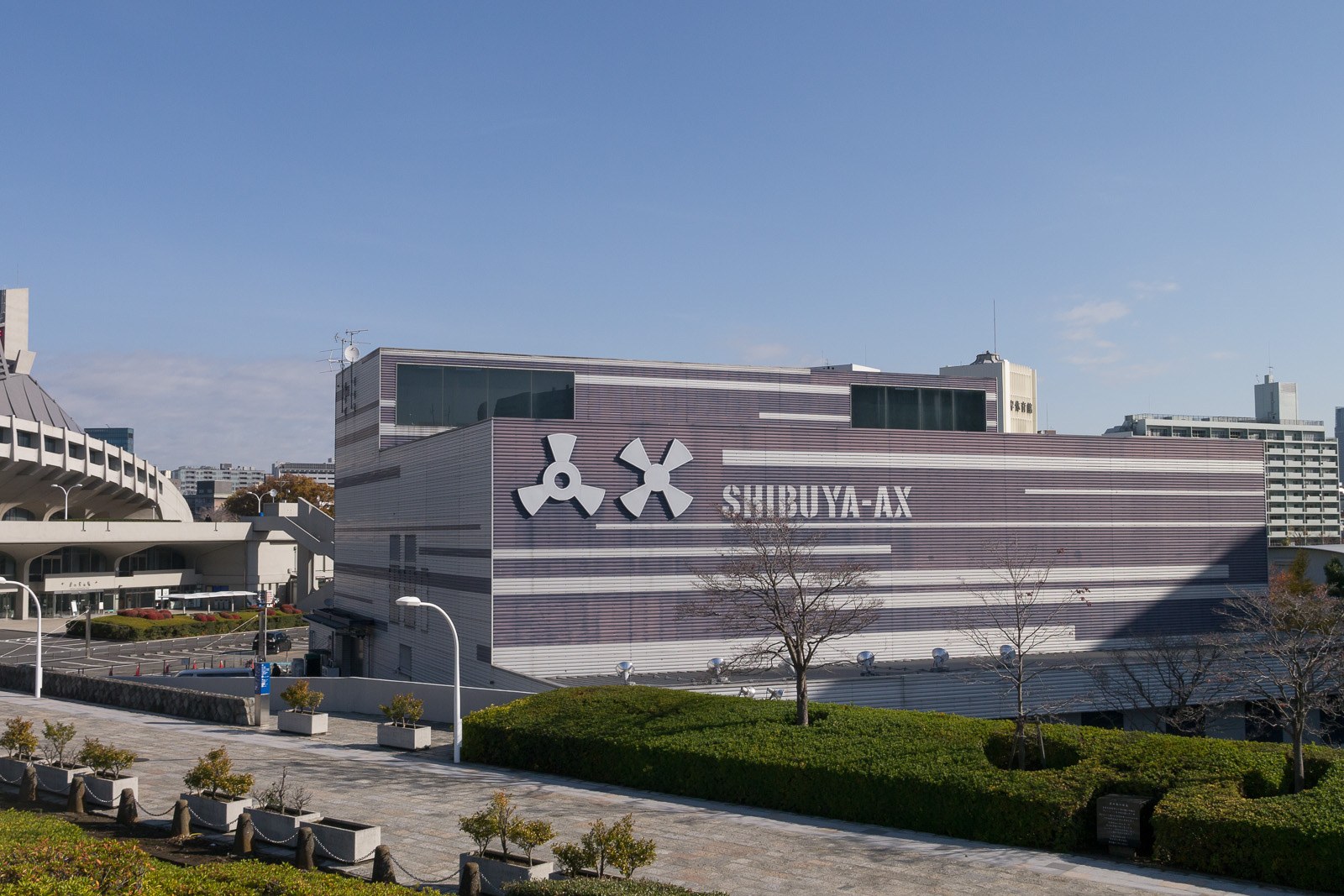
- The venue in 2012
- Interactive map of SHIBUYA-AX
- Location: 2-1-1 Jinnan Tokyo, Japan
- Coordinates: 35.666199°N 139.700001°E
- Owner: Dentsu and Nippon Television
- Seating type: standing
- Capacity: 1,500
- Type: Music venue

Construction
- Opened: December 16, 2000
- Closed: May 31, 2014

Website
- http://www.shibuya-ax.com

Shibuya-AX (stylized as SHIBUYA-AX) was a concert hall in Tokyo, Japan, near the Yoyogi National Gymnasium.

== Layout ==
Shibuya-AX was the only purpose-built concert hall or "live house" in the Tokyo metropolitan area that could accommodate 1,500 people. It was a popular venue for concerts by both Japanese and western artists.

== History ==
The site originally served as a parking lot for the Yoyogi National Gymnasium. Because regulations prohibited the construction of a permanent entertainment facility on the land, Shibuya-AX was built and operated as a "temporary structure" for over a decade.

On September 27, 2013, it was announced through the venue's official website that it would seize operations on May 31, 2014. The staff of Shibuya-AX requested J, the artist with the most performances at the concert hall, perform one last time at the venue. The concerts, entitled -Thank You AX!! Good Bye AX!!-, were held on May 3–4, 2014. The building was demolished and reverted back into a parking lot for the Yoyogi National Gymnasium.

== Notable events ==
- Following their formation in 2001, EXILE's first tour, Styles of Beyond, kicked off at this venue in April 2003.
- Buck-Tick's 2004 live album At the Night Side contains songs that were recorded at their April 30, 2003 performance here.
- Sonata Arctica's performance in this venue on February 5, 2005 (during the Reckoning Night world tour) was recorded and later released as a live DVD For the Sake of Revenge (released in 2006).
- Lady Gaga performed here on June 8, 2009, during The Fame Ball Tour.
- From May 5 to 9, 2011, J held five consecutive concerts here titled "J 14th Anniversary Special Live Set Fire Get Higher -Fire Higher 2011-", each day with different bands such as Mass of the Fermenting Dregs, Nothing's Carved in Stone, Avengers in Sci-Fi, Pay Money to My Pain and The Hiatus.
- South Korean Girl Group, T-ara held First Showcase in this venue on July 5, 2011, before release their debut Japanese single Bo Peep Bo Peep .
- Shibuya-AX served as one of the venues for A-Nation 2012 Music Week.
- For consecutive 3 years, Shibuya-AX was the official "home" of Shibuya-based pop idol group Passpo☆ (last show was on March 1, 2014)
