= Undead Indeed =

Live album (live DVD) by Tarot
- Released: 11 June 2008
- Recorded: 17 August 2007
- Venue: Rupla Club, Kuopio, Finland
- Genre: Heavy metal
- Length: 240 minutes
- Label: King Foo Entertainment

Tarot chronology
Crows Fly Black (2006)	Undead Indeed (2008)	Gravity of Light (2010)

Undead Indeed is the first live DVD/2CD by Finnish heavy metal band Tarot. It was recorded in Rupla Club, Kuopio, Finland, on 17 August 2007. The DVD was released on 11 June 2008.

== CD & DVD ==
=== Track listing (DVD) ===
1. Intro (Band coming on stage)
2. Crows Fly Black
3. Traitor
4. Pyre of Gods
5. Wings of Darkness
6. Back in the Fire
7. Tides
8. Bleeding Dust
9. Veteran of the Psychic Wars (Blue Öyster Cult cover)
10. Angels of Pain
11. Warhead
12. Follow Me Into Madness
13. Before the Skies Come Down
14. Ashes to the Stars
15. Undead Son
16. You
17. Crawlspace
18. Guitar solo
19. Rider of the Last Day
20. I Rule

=== CD ===
1. Crows Fly Back
2. Traitor
3. Pyre of Gods
4. Tides
5. Bleeding Dust
6. Angels Of Pain
7. Follow Me Into Madness
8. Before the Skies Come Down
9. Ashes to the Stars
10. Undead Son
11. You
12. Crawlspace
13. Rider of the Last Day
14. I Rule

== 2 DVD Version ==
=== Track listing (DVD 1) ===
1. Crows Fly Black
2. Traitor
3. Pyre of Gods
4. Wings of Darkness
5. Back in the Fire
6. Tides
7. Bleeding Dust
8. Veteran of the Psychic Wars (Blue Öyster Cult cover)
9. Angels of Pain
10. Warhead
11. Follow Me Into Madness
12. Before the Skies Come Down
13. Ashes to the Stars
14. Undead Son
15. You
16. Crawlspace
17. Guitar solo
18. Rider of the Last Day
19. I Rule

=== Bonus material (DVD 2) ===
- Marko & Zac Interview
- Stigmata Archives
- 21st Century Live Scenes
- Pyre Of Gods (promotional video)
- Ashes To The Stars (promotional video)

== 2 CD version ==
2CD version cover

=== Track listing (CD 1) ===
1. Crows Fly Black
2. Traitor
3. Pyre of Gods
4. Wings of Darkness
5. Back in the Fire
6. Tides
7. Bleeding Dust
8. Veteran of Psychic Wars
9. Angels of Pain
10. Warhead

=== Track listing (CD 2) ===
1. Follow Me Into Madness
2. Before the Skies Come Down
3. Ashes to the Stars
4. Undead Son
5. You
6. Crawlspace
7. Rider of the Last Day
8. I Rule
9. Guardian Angel (bonus track)
10. Things That Crawl at Night (bonus track)

The last two tracks were recorded at a separate performance on 6 January 2008.

== Performers ==
- Marko Hietala – vocals, bass
- Zachary Hietala – guitar
- Janne Tolsa – keyboard
- Pecu Cinnari – drums
- Tommi "Tuple" Salmela – sampler, vocals

== Charts ==
Chart (2008)	Peak position
Finnish Albums (Suomen virallinen lista)	18
