= Roses from the Deep =

2025 album by Marko Hietala

Studio album by Marko Hietala
- Released: 7 February 2025
- Genre: Heavy metal
- Length: 53:50
- Label: Nuclear Blast
- Producer: Tuomas Wäinölä

Marko Hietala chronology
| Mustan sydämen rovio (2019) | Roses from the Deep (2025) |

Singles from Roses from the Deep
- 1. "Left on Mars" Released: 13 March 2024; 2. "Frankenstein's Wife" Released: 4 September 2024; 3. "Impatient Zero" Released: 26 November 2024

Roses from the Deep is the second solo studio album by Finnish singer, songwriter and bassist Marko Hietala of Nightwish and Tarot fame, released on 7 February 2025 via Nuclear Blast.

== Background and promotion ==
In December 2020, Hietala told Nightwish he had decided to leave to focus on other projects. He had been suffering from several mental disorders, including depression, for a decade. Despite medication, he had kept on getting worse. After the recording of Human. :II: Nature. and in part due to the respite brought by COVID-19 pandemic, Hietala finally reached the conclusion that leaving the band would prevent his illnesses from worsening. On 12 January 2021, Hietala made his departure public and announced his withdrawal from the public eye. On 18 June 2022, Northern Kings made a comeback that ended their 12-year hiatus and Hietala's 17-month break from the public.

On 13 March 2024, Hietala released the first single titled "Left on Mars" as a duet with Tarja Turunen. On 4 September 2024 Hietala released the second single, "Frankenstein's Wife". On 26 November 2024, the third single, "Impatient Zero" was released, simultaneously with the announcement of his second solo album Roses from the Deep which was released on 7 February 2025.

== Critical reception ==
Professional ratings
Review scores
| Source | Rating |
|---|---|
| Kerrang! | 4/5 stars |
| Metal Hammer (Germany) | 4/7 stars |

Writing for Kerrang!, Steve Beebee rated Roses from the Deep 4/5 and described the album as "better than any of us could have expected".

== Track listing ==
All tracks are written by Marko Hietala.

| No. | Title | Length |
|---|---|---|
| 1. | "Frankenstein's Wife" | 5:25 |
| 2. | "Left on Mars" (featuring Tarja Turunen) | 5:01 |
| 3. | "Proud Whore" | 5:02 |
| 4. | "Two Soldiers" (with vocals from JP Leppäluoto) | 4:50 |
| 5. | "The Dragon Must Die" | 8:12 |
| 6. | "The Devil You Know" | 4:12 |
| 7. | "Rebel of the North" | 4:00 |
| 8. | "Impatient Zero" | 5:59 |
| 9. | "Tammikuu" | 4:34 |
| 10. | "Roses from the Deep" | 6:31 |
| 11. | "Impatient Zero" (edit) | 4:16 |
| Total length: | | 53:50 |

== Personnel ==
- Marko Hietala – lead vocals, bass
- Tuomas Wäinölä – guitar, synth
- Anssi Nykänen – drums

== Charts ==
Chart performance for Roses from the Deep
| Chart (2025) | Peak position |
|---|---|
| Finnish Albums (Suomen virallinen lista) | 3 |
| Scottish Albums (OCC) | 81 |
| UK Album Downloads (OCC) | 48 |
| UK Independent Albums (OCC) | 20 |
| UK Rock & Metal Albums (OCC) | 8 |
