= The Spell of Iron MMXI =

Studio album by Tarot
- Released: 11 April 2011
- Genre: Heavy metal
- Length: 42:06
- Label: King Foo Entertainment

Tarot chronology
Gravity of Light (2010)	The Spell of Iron MMXI (2011)

The Spell of Iron MMXI is the ninth album by Finnish heavy metal band Tarot, released on 11 April 2011. It is a re-recording of the band's 1986 debut album for its 25th anniversary. It is the final album to feature Pecu Cinnari before his death in 2016.

== Track listing ==
1. "Midwinter Nights" - 4:15
2. "Dancing on the Wire" - 3:34
3. "Back in the Fire" - 4:58
4. "Love's Not Made for My Kind" - 6:20
5. "Never Forever" - 2:50
6. "The Spell of Iron" - 4:38
7. "De Mortui Nil Nisi Bene" - 3:35
8. "Pharao" - 3:26
9. "Wings of Darkness" - 3:27
10. "Things That Crawl at Night" - 5:03

Bonus track

11. "I Walk Forever" (Live) - 5:26

== Personnel ==
- Marko Hietala – lead vocals, bass, acoustic guitar
- Zachary Hietala – guitars
- Janne Tolsa – keyboards
- Pecu Cinnari – drums
- Tommi Salmela – samples, co-lead vocals, backing vocals

== Charts ==
Chart (2011)	Peak position
Finnish Albums (Suomen virallinen lista)	16
