= Fire-Hearted =

2009 studio album by Elias Viljanen

Studio album by Elias Viljanen
- Released: 24 June 2009
- Recorded: 2009
- Genre: Progressive metal, power metal
- Label: Spinefarm
- Producer: Elias Viljanen

Elias Viljanen chronology
The Leadstar (2005)	Fire-Hearted (2009)	The Evillusionist (2021)

Fire-Hearted is the third studio album by metal musician Elias Viljanen as solo artist. The album features Marko Hietala (ex-Nightwish, ex-Tarot, ex-Northern Kings) and Tony Kakko (Sonata Arctica, ex-Northern Kings) on vocals. Also contributing is Jari Kainulainen (Evergrey, Ex-Stratovarius) on bass, Henrik Klingenberg (Sonata Arctica) on keyboards and Mikko Sirén (Apocalyptica) on drums. The album was out in June 2009. The song "Last Breath of Love" with Hietala on vocals can be heard on Viljanen's Myspace together with the title-track.

== Track listing ==
All songs written by Elias Viljanen except where noted.

1. "Fire-Hearted" - 04:18
2. "Last Breath of Love" (Elias Viljanen, Marko Hietala) - 03:41
  - featuring Marko Hietala on vocals
3. "Cruel Groove" - 2:52
4. "Kiss of Rain" (Elias Viljanen, Tony Kakko) - 3:53
  - featuring Tony Kakko on vocals
5. "Head Up High" - 2:58
6. "Up to Speed" - 2:29
7. "Supernatural" - 4:13
8. "One Tonight" - 3:53
9. "The Triumph" - 3:37
10. "My Guiding Light" - 3:00
11. "Showstopper" - 3:51
12. "Beautiful Piece" (Elias Viljanen, Jaan Wessman) - 4:04
  - featuring Jaan Wessman on fretless bass guitar

== Credits ==
- Elias Viljanen – guitars
- Henrik Klingenberg – keyboards
- Jari Kainulainen – bass guitar
- Tomi Ylönen – drums

=== Guests ===
- Marko Hietala (ex-Nightwish) – vocals (on "Last Breath of Love")
- Tony Kakko (Sonata Arctica) – vocals (on "Kiss of Rain")
- Jaan Wessman – fretless bass guitar (on "Beautiful Piece")
- Mikko Sirén (Apocalyptica) – drums (on "Supernatural", "Beautiful Piece", "Last Breath of Love", "Kiss of Rain", "Fire-Hearted" and "One Tonight")
