= Mustan sydämen rovio =

2019 album by Marko Hietala

Studio album by Marko Hietala
- Released: 24 May 2019
- Genre: Hard rock, heavy metal, progressive rock, folk metal
- Length: 52:03
- Label: Nuclear Blast

Marko Hietala chronology
Mustan sydämen rovio (2019)	Roses from the Deep (2025)

Singles from Mustan sydämen rovio
- 1. "Isäni ääni" Released: 15 May 2019

Mustan Sydämen Rovio (Pyre of the Black Heart) is the debut solo album by Finnish singer and bassist Marko Hietala of Nightwish and Tarot fame, released on 24 May 2019 via Nuclear Blast.

Hietala is credited in the album with his birth name Marko, instead of Marco. He said he adopted the version with "c" when he was young and trying to sound "cool", but that now it doesn't matter to him anymore. He intends to be credited as Marko in all his future projects. He also referred to the "Marco" spelling as "the last lie I had constructed about myself".

An English version of the album was released on 24 January 2020.

== Background, production and song information ==
Mustan Sydämen Rovio spent 2.5 years in the making, with work on it commencing when Nightwish took a break in 2016.

It features songs that Hietala had been writing for years, some dating back to 20 years before its release. According to him, these are songs that either felt "too personal" for him or that couldn't fit his main bands. They discuss both personal and fictional stories. He defined the album's sound as "hard prog".

Nightwish's then session drummer Kai Hahto was initially considered for the album, but he got himself injured while renovating his house and was replaced by Hietala's old friend Anssi Nykänen.

"Isäni ääni", a tribute to fathers in general, was released as a single on 15 May 2019 and received a video directed by Ville Lipiäinen, who has directed several videos for Nightwish. The lyrics are inspired by his father, who died in 2012 following complications of alcoholism, which Hietala himself suffered from. He has been teetotal since 2010.

== Track listing ==
No.	Title	Length
1.	"Kiviä"	5:15
2.	"Isäni ääni"	4:37
3.	"Tähti, hiekka ja varjo"	5:01
4.	"Kuolleiden jumalten poika"	4:41
5.	"Laulu sinulle"	7:10
6.	"Minä olen tie"	5:05
7.	"Juoksen rautateitä"	3:51
8.	"Vapauden kuolinmarssi"	5:02
9.	"Unelmoin öisin"	5:38
10.	"Totuus vapauttaa"	5:43
Total length:		52:03

== Personnel ==
- Marko Hietala – lead vocals, bass
- Tuomas Wäinölä – guitar
- Vili Ollila – keyboards
- Anssi Nykänen – drums

== Pyre of the Black Heart ==
Pyre of the Black Heart

Studio album by Marko Hietala
- Released: 24 January 2020
- Genre: Hard rock, traditional heavy metal, progressive rock, folk metal
- Length: 52:03
- Label: Nuclear Blast

Marko Hietala chronology
Pyre of the Black Heart (2020)	Roses from the Deep (2025)

Singles from Pyre of the Black Heart
- 1. "Stones" Released: 22 November 2019; 2. "Death March for Freedom" Released: 2 April 2020

Mustan Sydämen Rovio was re-released in English under the title Pyre of the Black Heart on 24 January 2020, also via Nuclear Blast. Hietala says he wrote the songs both in Finnish and in English, which facilitated translations. He was initially unsure whether he would release two different albums at once or one album half in Finnish, half in English, before making the decision of releasing two different albums on different dates.

The English-language release was followed by a European tour, with shows opened up by Oceanhoarse.

=== Track listing ===
No.	Title	Length
1.	"Stones"	5:15
2.	"The Voice of My Father"	4:37
3.	"Star, Sand and Shadow"	5:01
4.	"Dead God's Son"	4:42
5.	"For You"	7:10
6.	"I Am the Way"	5:05
7.	"Runner of the Railways"	3:51
8.	"Death March for Freedom"	5:02
9.	"I Dream"	5:38
10.	"Truth Shall Set You Free"	5:42
Total length:		52:03

=== Personnel ===
- Marko Hietala – lead vocals, bass
- Tuomas Wäinölä – guitar
- Vili Ollila – keyboards
- Anssi Nykänen – drums

=== Critical reception ===
Professional ratings
Review scores
Source	Rating
Kerrang!	4/5 stars
Metal Hammer (Germany)	5/7 stars

Writing for Kerrang!, Steve Beebee rated Pyre of the Black Heart 4/5 and said it mostly "gives insight into what Marko's capable of when given a free run. It's a one-off, almost certainly, but a distraction of the most endearing kind.
