= Breathing Fire (disambiguation) =

Breathing Fire is a 1991 martial arts film.

- "Breathing Fire", song by Fu Manchu from King of The Road 2000
- "Breathing Fire", song by Tarot from To Live Again and Follow Me into Madness
- "Breathing Fire", song by Anne-Marie from Speak Your Mind

== See also ==
- Fire breathing (disambiguation)
