= Difference (album) =

Studio album by Dreamtale
- Released: April 25, 2005
- Studio: Goldenworks
- Genre: Power metal
- Length: 49:25
- Label: Spinefarm Records
- Producer: Timo Tolkki

Dreamtale chronology
Ocean's Heart (2003)	Difference (2005)	Phoenix (2008)

Professional ratings
Review scores
Source	Rating
Metal.de	6/10 stars
Imperiumi	7.5/10 stars
Soundi	4/5 stars
Scream Magazine	5/6 stars
Jærbladet	3/5 stars
Powermetal.de	
Vampster	

Difference is the third album of the Finnish power metal band Dreamtale. It was released on 25 April 2005 on Spinefarm Records. It was also released in Japan. It features on vocals for the first time in the band Jarkko Ahola of the band Teräsbetoni.

== Track listing ==
1. "Lost Souls" (3:12)
2. "Wings of Icaros" (4:54)
3. "New Life" (4:50)
4. "Lucid Times" (7:31)
5. "Mirror" (3:28)
6. "World's Child" (3:57)
7. "Sail Away" (3:46)
8. "Fly" (4:07)
9. "Secret Door" (3:55)
10. "We Are One" (4:18)
11. "Green Fields" (3:11)
12. "Powerplay" (4:15) (bonus in Japanese release)

== Personnel ==
- Jarkko Ahola – vocals
- Rami Keränen – guitar
- Esa Orjatsalo – guitar
- Turkka Vuorinen – keyboards
- Pasi Ristolainen – bass
- Pete Rosenbom – drums
