= Everlasting Flame =

Studio album by Dreamtale
- Released: 1 April 2022
- Genres: Power metal, symphonic metal
- Length: 60:36
- Label: Self-released

Dreamtale chronology
Seventhian... Memories of Time (2016)	Everlasting Flame (2022)	Aetherbound (2026)

Everlasting Flame is the eighth studio album by Finnish power metal band Dreamtale. It was released independently by the band in 2022.

On Suomen virallinen lista, the official Finnish album charts, Everlasting Flame entered at number 27 in week 14 of 2022, but only remained for that one week.

Several lineup changes preceded the release, with six years having passed since the previous Dreamtale album. A single from the album was released, "The Glory". "Sleeping Beauty" had been a single previously, but was re-recorded for this album, alongside a new version of "Lady Dragon" which was originally found on the 2008 Dreamtale album Phoenix.

== Reception ==
Imperiumi gave a very strong score, 9 out of 10, struggling to find anything negative. There might be a song or two too many, with the outro being a "slightly unnecessary addition". There was "not a single weak track, even though not all the songs are outright hits". Kaaoszine gave 5 out of 5, among others highlighting the overall composition of the album: "how skillfully album is composed in terms of musical storytelling, as it doesnt let you get bored for a split second, it always keeps you intrigued and captivated". The reviewer liked the album so much that she liked "to thank Dreamtale for this wonderful journey" and "for staying true to power-metal".

Desibeli.net stated that Dreamtale's "melodic and sometimes symphonic metal that does not lack catchiness, lift and carrying capacity", and individual tracks could be described as "super catchy" and "ridiculously catchy". Some tracks near the end of the album were "weirder" and possible to laugh at, bringing "a lot of color to the whole".

Inferno.fi and Soundi were a bit lower with a 3 out of 5 rating. Metalliuola gave 8 out of 10.

== Track listing ==
1. "King of Kings" – 4:52
2. "Blood of the Morning Star" – 5:25
3. "Last Goodbyes" – 3:21
4. "Ghostride" – 6:09
5. "Immortal Souls" – 4:59
6. "No Shadow Goes Too Far" – 4:33
7. "Summer Rose" – 3:50
8. "The Glory" – 3:55
9. "Eye for an Eye" – 4:44
10. "Lady Dragon (2022)" – 5:04
11. "Silent Scream" – 4:06
12. "Tanhupullo" – 2:32
13. "Sleeping Beauty (2022)" – 4:49
14. "Pirates' Lullaby" – 2:17

== Personnel ==
- Nitte Valo – vocals
- Jarno Vitri – vocals
- Rami Keränen – guitars
- Zsolt Szilágyi – guitars
- Mikko Hepo-Oja – bass
- Akseli Kaasalainen – keyboards
- Arto Pitkänen – drums
