= Angel of Light =

Angel of Light or variants thereof may refer to:

- Lucifer, also known as the "Angel of Light"

== Music ==
- Angels of Light, American folk rock band founded by Michael Gira
- The Angels of Light (UK band)
- Angel of Light, a 2019 album by Angel Witch
- "Angel of Light", a song by Dreamtale from the 2011 album Epsilon
- "Angel of Light", a song by Petra from the 1981 album Never Say Die
- "Angel of Light", a song by Mercyful Fate from the 1994 album Time
- Symphony No. 7 (Rautavaara), subtitled Angel of Light

== Other uses ==
- Angels of Light (theater group), from Liberty, Texas

== See also ==
- Angel of Darkness (disambiguation)
