= Rethroned =

Studio album by Northern Kings
- Released: November 19, 2008; February 25, 2009 (Japan)
- Genre: Symphonic metal
- Length: 53:44
- Label: Warner Music Finland
- Producer: Erkka Korhonen

Northern Kings chronology
Reborn (2007)	Rethroned (2008)

Professional ratings
Review scores
Source	Rating
RevelationZ	8.5/10 stars

Rethroned is the second studio album by Finnish symphonic metal band Northern Kings. It was released on November 19, 2008, as a CD in Finland and to download via the European iTunes Store. Upon release, the album entered the Finnish charts at number 16. The album was released in Japan on February 25, 2009, with the Michael Jackson cover "They Don't Care About Us" as a bonus track. The iTunes edition included also the orchestral version of "They Don't Care About Us".

The first single and music video released off this album was the Seal cover "Kiss from a Rose" (originally from the soundtrack of the film Batman Forever). The album also includes two other movie-based tracks: "Training Montage" (from Rocky IV) and "A View to a Kill" (from the 1985 James Bond 007 film of the same title).

== Track listing ==
No.	Title	Writer(s)	Vocals	Length
1.	"Training Montage" (From the movie Rocky IV)	Vince DiCola	Instrumental	3:32
2.	"Wanted Dead or Alive" (Bon Jovi cover)	Jon Bon Jovi, Richie Sambora	Marko Hietala	3:51
3.	"Kiss From a Rose" (Seal cover)	Seal	Entire group	4:48
4.	"A View to a Kill" (Duran Duran cover)	Duran Duran, John Barry	Entire group	5:18
5.	"Nothing Compares 2 U" (Prince cover)	Prince	Tony Kakko	6:39
6.	"My Way" (Frank Sinatra cover)	Music: Claude François, Jacques Revaux; English lyrics: Paul Anka	Jarkko Ahola	4:22
7.	"Strangelove" (Depeche Mode cover)	Martin Gore	Entire group	4:34
8.	"Take On Me" (A-ha cover)	Magne Furuholmen, Morten Harket, Pål Waaktaar	Entire group	3:57
9.	"I Should Be So Lucky" (Kylie Minogue cover)	Mike Stock, Matt Aitken, Pete Waterman	Juha-Pekka Leppäluoto, Jarkko Ahola	4:42
10.	"Killer" (Adamski cover)	Adamski, Seal	Entire group	4:31
11.	"Róisín Dubh (Black Rose): A Rock Legend" (Thin Lizzy cover)	Phil Lynott, Gary Moore	Jarkko Ahola, Marko Hietala	7:30
Total length:				53:44

Japanese Bonus Track
No.	Title	Writer(s)	Vocals	Length
12.	"They Don't Care About Us" (Michael Jackson cover)	Michael Jackson	Entire group	4:46
Total length:				58:30

iTunes Bonus Track
No.	Title	Writer(s)	Vocals	Length
13.	"They Don't Care About Us (Orchestral Edit)" (Michael Jackson cover)	Michael Jackson	Entire group	4:43
Total length:				63:13

== Personnel ==
- Marko Hietala – vocals
- Tony Kakko – vocals
- Jarkko Ahola – vocals
- Juha-Pekka Leppäluoto – vocals

Additional musicians

- Erkka Korhonen (of the Ari Koivunen band) – guitar
- Erkki Silvennoinen – bass
- Mirka Rantanen – drums
- Vili Olila – piano, keyboards
- Mikko P. Mustonen – orchestrations
- Two Finger Choir – backing vocals
