= Fire breathing =

Fire breathing, fire-breathing, firebreathing, fire breather, or firebreather may refer to:

- Fire-breathing monster, a mythological or fantastical monster able to breathe fire
- Fire breathing (circus act), the act of making a plume of fire by creating a precise mist of fuel from the mouth
- Firebreather (comics), a comic series about a teenage half-dragon
  - Firebreather (film), a 2010 animated film based on the comic
- Firebreather (game), a heroic fantasy play-by-mail game
- "Firebreather", a 2017 song by Macklemore from Gemini

== See also ==
- Breathing Fire (disambiguation)
