= Reborn (Northern Kings album) =

Studio album by Northern Kings
- Released: October 31, 2007
- Genre: Power metal; symphonic metal
- Length: 68:47
- Label: Warner Music Finland
- Producer: Erkka Korhonen

Northern Kings chronology
Reborn (2007)	Rethroned (2008)

Professional ratings
Review scores
Source	Rating
AllMusic	2.5/5 stars
emp.de	positive
whiskey-soda.de	+1

Reborn is the debut studio album by Finnish heavy metal cover supergroup Northern Kings, released on October 31, 2007. The album sold over 17,000 copies in Finland alone and was certified gold.

Two singles were released from the album: "We Don't Need Another Hero" (Tina Turner cover, from the soundtrack of Mad Max Beyond Thunderdome) and "Hello" (Lionel Richie cover). A music video was also produced for the first single.

== Track listing ==
No.	Title	Writer(s)	Vocals	Length
1.	"Don't Stop Believin'" (Journey cover)	Jonathan Cain, Neal Schon & Steve Perry	Marko Hietala	5:29
2.	"We Don't Need Another Hero" (Tina Turner cover)	Graham Lyle & Terry Britten	Entire group	4:48
3.	"Broken Wings" (Mr. Mister cover)	Mr. Mister & John Lang	Tony Kakko	5:32
4.	"Rebel Yell" (Billy Idol cover)	Billy Idol & Steve Stevens	Juha-Pekka Leppäluoto	7:29
5.	"Ashes to Ashes" (David Bowie cover)	David Bowie	Tony Kakko	4:39
6.	"Fallen on Hard Times" (Jethro Tull cover)	Ian Anderson	Marko Hietala	3:54
7.	"I Just Died in Your Arms" (Cutting Crew cover)	Nick Van Eede	Jarkko Ahola	5:49
8.	"Sledgehammer" (Peter Gabriel cover)	Peter Gabriel	Tony Kakko	5:08
9.	"Don't Bring Me Down" (Electric Light Orchestra cover)	Jeff Lynne	Jarkko Ahola	4:06
10.	"In the Air Tonight" (Phil Collins cover)	Phil Collins	Marko Hietala	4:35
11.	"Creep" (Radiohead cover)	Radiohead & Albert Hammond	Juha-Pekka Leppäluoto	5:38
12.	"Hello" (Lionel Richie cover)	Lionel Richie	Jarkko Ahola	4:31
13.	"Brothers in Arms" (Dire Straits cover)	Mark Knopfler	Juha-Pekka Leppäluoto	6:59
Total length:				68:47

Special Edition
No.	Title	Writer(s)	Vocals	Length
14.	"We Don't Need Another Hero (Orchestra Remix)" (Tina Turner cover)	Graham Lyle & Terry Britten	Entire group	4:52
15.	"Creep (Killdivo Remix)" (Radiohead cover)	Radiohead & Albert Hammond	Juha-Pekka Leppäluoto	5:38
Total length:				79:17

== Personnel ==
=== Northern Kings ===
- Marko Hietala – vocals
- Tony Kakko – vocals
- Jarkko Ahola – vocals
- Juha-Pekka Leppäluoto – vocals

=== Musicians ===
- Erkka Korhonen: Lead & Rhythm Guitars
- Erkki Silvennoinen: Bass
- Anssi Nykanen, Sami Osala: Drums, Percussion
- Vili Ollila: Piano, Keyboards, Programming
- Two Finger Choir: Backing Vocals

== Production ==
- Vocal arrangements: Aleksi Parviainen & Erkka Korhonen (tracks 1, 2, 4, 6, 7, 9–13) & Tony Kakko (3, 5, 8)
- Arranged by Aleksi Parviainen (1–6, 8, 10, 11), Jarko Ahola (7, 9, 12) & Mikko Mustonen (13)
- Produced, recorded and engineered by Erkka Korhonen
- Mixed by Mikko Karmila
- Mastered by Svante Forsback
