= World Changed Forever =

Studio album by Dreamtale
- Released: 26 April 2013
- Genre: Symphonic power metal
- Length: 58:22
- Label: Secret Door Records

Dreamtale chronology
Epsilon (2011)	World Changed Forever (2013)	Seventhian... Memories of Time (2016)

Professional ratings
Review scores
Source	Rating
Soundi	3/5 stars
Imperiumi	9/10 stars
Kaaoszine	8.5/10 stars

World Changed Forever is the sixth studio album by Finnish power metal band Dreamtale. Released on The Secret Door Records label on 26 April 2013 in Finland, it reached number 41 on Suomen virallinen lista, The Official Finnish Charts.

== Track listing ==
1. "The Shore" – 2:23
2. "Island of My Heart" – 5:37
3. "Tides of War" – 4:03
4. "We Have No God" – 5:29
5. "The Signs Were True" – 5:09
6. "The Heart After Dark" – 4:26
7. "Join the Rain" – 4:32
8. "Back to the Stars" – 6:17
9. "World Changed Forever" – 6:05
10. "My Next Move" – 3:52
11. "Dreamtime" – 6:34
12. "Destiny's Chance" – 3:54
13. "The End of Our Days" – 4:22 (Korean edition bonus track)

== Personnel ==
- Erkki Seppänen – vocals
- Rami Keränen – guitar, backing vocals
- Seppo Kolehmainen – guitar
- Akseli Kaasalainen – keyboards
- Heikki Ahonen – bass
- Petteri Rosenbom – drums
