= The Leadstar =

Studio album by Elias Viljanen
- Released: August 19, 2005
- Recorded: Rantajätkät Studios, Finland
- Label: Lion Music

Elias Viljanen chronology
Taking the Lead (2002)	The Leadstar (2005)	Fire-Hearted (2009)

The Leadstar is the second solo album by Sonata Arctica guitarist Elias Viljanen released by Lion Music in 2005.

== Track listing ==
1. "Lord of the Strings" – 01:24
2. "High-Powered" – 03:45
3. "Touching the Sky" – 04:28
4. "Unity for Life" – 03:09
5. "Northern Storm" – 03:16
6. "Fast & Furious" – 04:31
7. "Magic Seven" – 03:27
8. "Follow the Leadstar" – 04:10
9. "Driving Force" – 04:07
10. "Hello (Lionel Richie Cover)" – 04:05
11. "Evilized" – 02:23
12. "Home-Coming" – 02:44

== Personnel ==
- Elias Viljanen – guitars
- Rami Herckman – bass guitar
- Tomi Ylönen – drums
- Jari Koivisto – guitars
- Jukka Talasmäki – guitars

=== Guest musicians ===
- Lacu Lahtinen – drums
- Jani Kemppinen – keyboards
- Jaan Wessman – bass guitar
- Lars Eric Mattsson – guitars
- Janne Juutinen – drums
- John Kärppä – guitars
