= Crows Fly Black =

Studio album by Tarot
- Released: 27 October 2006
- Recorded: 2006
- Genre: Heavy metal
- Label: King Foo Entertainment
- Producer: J. Tolsa/M. Hietala

Tarot chronology
Suffer Our Pleasures (2003)	Crows Fly Black (2006)	Gravity of Light (2010)

Professional ratings
Review scores
Source	Rating
Metal Temple	7/10
Scream Magazine	4/6

Crows Fly Black is the seventh album by Finnish heavy metal band Tarot, released on 27 October 2006. This album is accompanied by the single "You", and the music video "Ashes to the Stars". This is the first album to officially acknowledge Tommi 'Tumple' Salmela as a member of the band, referred to as an 'old-new' member; until then, Tommi's role was limited to sampling and backing vocals, while in this album, Tommi takes role of fully fledged vocalist.

== Track listing ==
1. Crows Fly Black - 6:31
2. Traitor - 3:38
3. Ashes to the Stars - 5:25
4. Messenger of Gods - 4:23
5. Before the Skies Come Down - 4:06
6. Tides - 5:33
7. Bleeding Dust - 4:23
8. You - 3:44
9. Howl! - 4:22
10. Grey - 4:49
11. *Veteran of Psychic Wars (Bonus Track) - 5:06

== Charts ==
Chart (2006)	Peak position
Finnish Albums (Suomen virallinen lista)	5

== Personnel ==
Tarot

- Marko Hietala – vocals & backing vocals, bass, acoustic guitar
- Zachary Hietala – guitars
- Janne Tolsa – keyboards
- Pecu Cinnari – drums
- Tommi Salmela – samples, vocals & backing vocals

Guest musicians

- Emppu Vuorinen (Nightwish) – guitar solo on "Traitor"
- MC Raaka Pee (Turmion Kätilöt) – backing vocals
