= Zachary Hietala =

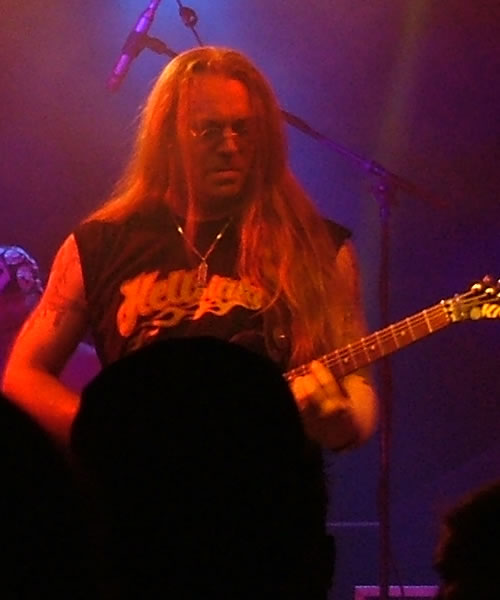
- Zachary Hietala live with Tarot.

Background information
- Birth name: Sakari Hietala
- Born: 10 August 1962 (age 63)
- Origin: Tervo, Finland
- Genres: Heavy metal, power metal
- Occupation(s): Musician, songwriter
- Instrument: Guitar
- Years active: 1986–present

Sakari "Zachary" Hietala (born August 10, 1962 in Tervo, Finland) is the guitarist, co-songwriter and founding member of Finnish heavy metal band Tarot (formerly Purgatory) in early 1980s, together with his younger brother Marko Hietala, who joined Nightwish in 2001. Zachary works as a youth instructor in his hometown, Kuopio, as well as teaching music theory to ninth and tenth grade students, and takes part in the management of the official Tarot website, responding to questions and comments made by fans on the forum.

Zachary Hietala plays guitar in Marenne, and is one of the composers in the band's debut album that was released in February 2009.

== Discography ==
=== Tarot ===
- Spell of Iron (1986)
- Follow Me into Madness (1988)
- To Live Forever (1993)
- To Live Again Live CD (1994)
- Stigmata (1995)
- For the Glory of Nothing (1998)
- Shining Black Best of (2003)
- Suffer Our Pleasures (2003)
- Crows Fly Black (2006)
- Undead Indeed Live DVD (2008)
- Gravity of Light (2010)
- The Spell of Iron MMXI (2011)

=== Marenne ===
- The Past Prelude (2009)
