= Aetherbound =

Studio album by Dreamtale
- Released: 31 July 2026
- Recorded: 2024–2025
- Genre: Power metal
- Length: 52:23
- Label: Self-released

Dreamtale chronology
Everlasting Flame (2022)	Aetherbound (2026)

Singles from Aetherbound
- 1. "Battleheart" Released: 26 January 2024; 2. "Mirror Mirror" Released: 4 May 2026; 3. "The Wave of Time" Released: 27 May 2026; 4. "Tale of Dreams" Released: 24 June 2026

Aetherbound is the ninth studio album by Finnish power metal band Dreamtale. It was released independently by the band in 2026. The album was first announced to be in the works in June 2024. On Suomen virallinen lista, the official Finnish album charts, Aetherbound entered at number 43, as well as number 6 in the physical charts.

Several singles preceded the release, including "Battleheart", "Mirror Mirror", "The Wave of Time", and "Tale of Dreams".

== Track listing ==
1. "Fairy Dance" – 3:36
2. "No Tomorrow" – 4:25
3. "Battleheart" – 2:48
4. "Helper's High" – 4:46
5. "Tale of Dreams" – 4:10
6. "Cosmic Play" – 3:58
7. "See You Again" – 3:07
8. "Mirror Mirror" – 4:44
9. "The Wave of Time" – 4:04
10. "Blackwind Arms" – 3:34
11. "License to Live" – 4:24
12. "Turn the Tide" – 4:30
13. "Thunderpath" – 4:17

== Personnel ==
- Nitte Valo – vocals
- Jarno Vitri – vocals
- Rami Keränen – guitars
- Zsolt Szilágyi – guitars
- Mikko Hepo-Oja – bass
- Akseli Kaasalainen – keyboards
- Arto Pitkänen – drums
