= Seventhian... Memories of Time =

Studio album by Dreamtale
- Released: 23 November 2016
- Recorded: 2016
- Genre: Symphonic power metal
- Length: 86:14
- Label: Secret Door

Dreamtale chronology
World Changed Forever (2013)	Seventhian... Memories of Time (2016)	Everlasting Flame (2022)

Professional ratings
Review scores
Source	Rating
Earshot.at	7.5/10
Imperiumi	8/10
Metalliluola	7/10

Seventhian... Memories of Time is the seventh studio album by Finnish power metal band Dreamtale, released globally on the Secret Door Records label on 9 December 2016. It was released earlier in Japan, on 23 November 2016. It comes as a two-piece CD set; the first disc, "Seventhian", contains new songs, and the second disc, "Memories of Time", contains new re-recorded versions of the band's older tracks, with the disc title being a reference to one of their tracks from the band's first album Beyond Reality.

== Track listing ==
=== Disc 1: Seventhian ===
1. "Dreality" – 3:28
2. "For Our Future" – 4:05
3. "October Is Mine" – 4:07
4. "Picnic Inferno" – 4:18
5. "Cabal Toyboy" – 4:41
6. "True Life" – 4:19
7. "Reality Reborn" – 4:29
8. "Fusion Illusion" – 4:44
9. "Names on the Wall" – 4:30
10. "Greenback Hunter" – 3:44
11. "Moral Messiah" – 4:14
12. "Embrace My Scars" – 5:12

=== Disc 2: Memories of Time ===
1. "Refuge From Reality" – 4:51
2. "Call of the Wild" – 4:51
3. "Angel's Eyes" – 4:17
4. "Two Hundred Men" – 3:55
5. "My Only Wish" – 4:53
6. "World's Child" – 4:52
7. "Take What the Heavens Create" – 2:52
8. "Firebird" – 3:52

Total runtime: 86:14

== Personnel ==
- Rami Keränen – guitar and backing vocals
- Erkki Seppänen – vocals
- Janne Juutinen – drums
- Seppo Kolehmainen – guitar
- Akseli Kaasalainen – keyboards
- Heikki Ahonen – bass
