= Northern Kings =

Finnish cover band

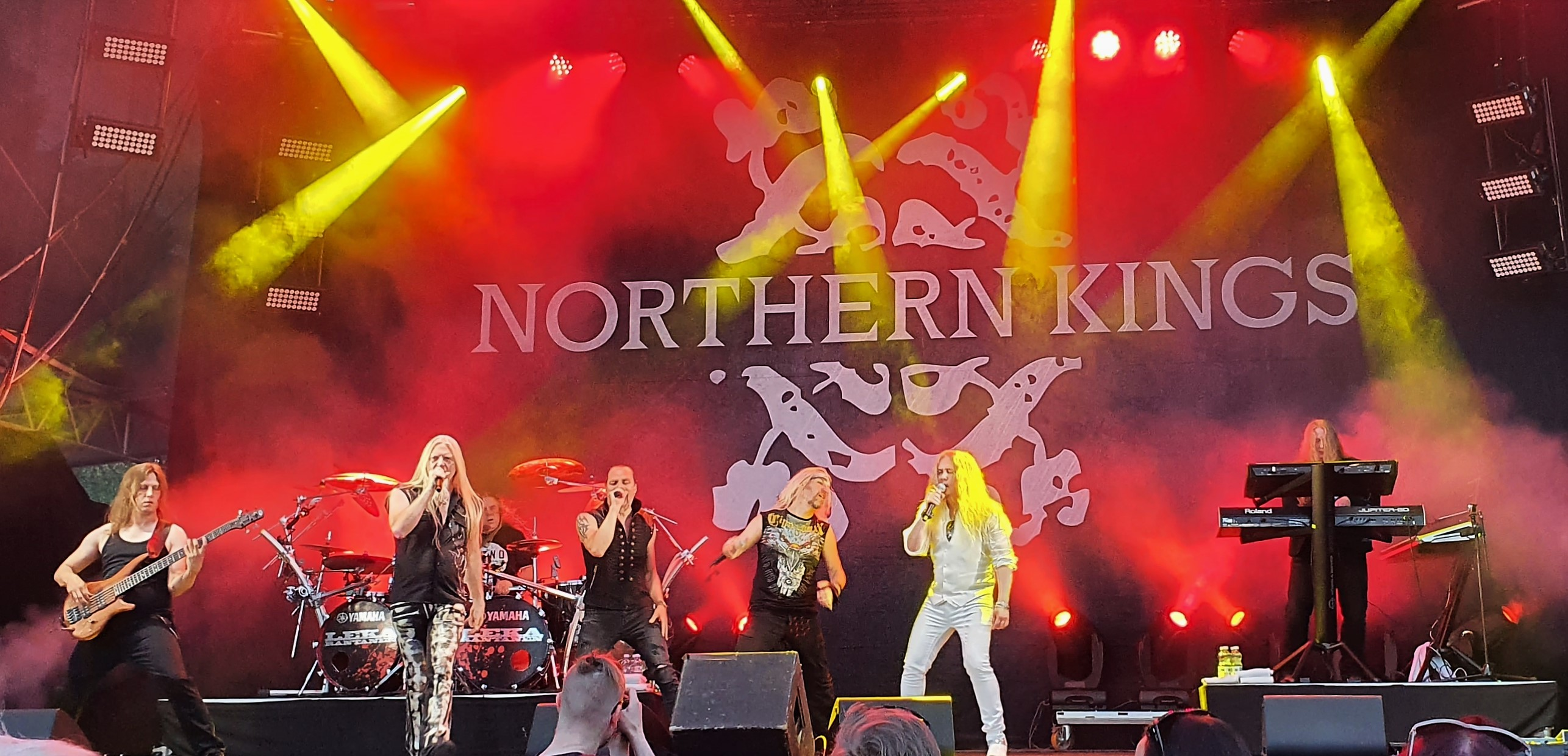
- The band live in 2022

Background information
- Origin: Finland
- Genres: Symphonic metal, power metal
- Years active: 2007–2010, 2022–present
- Label: Warner Music Finland
- Members: Jarkko Ahola; Marko Hietala; Tony Kakko; Juha-Pekka Leppäluoto

Northern Kings is a Finnish symphonic metal cover supergroup, made up of four well known musicians: Jarkko Ahola from Teräsbetoni, ex-Dreamtale, Marko Hietala from Tarot, ex-Nightwish, Tony Kakko from Sonata Arctica and Juha-Pekka Leppäluoto from Charon, Harmaja and ex-Poisonblack.

Their first single, "We Don't Need Another Hero" (originally performed by Tina Turner), was released in 2007, followed by their debut album Reborn. In late 2008, their second album Rethroned was released, headlined by the single "Kiss from a Rose" (originally performed by Seal). They last released a single "Lapponia" in 2010.

On 18 June 2022, Northern Kings made a comeback after being on hiatus for 12 years. The band performed at the 'Tuhdimmat Tahdit festival' in Nokia, Finland.

== Discography ==
=== Albums ===
- Reborn (2007)
- Rethroned (2008)

=== Singles ===
- "We Don't Need Another Hero" (2007)
- "Hello" (2007)
- "Kiss from a Rose" (2008)
- "Lapponia" (2010)

== Members ==
- Jarkko Ahola – vocals
- Marko Hietala – vocals
- Tony Kakko – vocals
- Juha-Pekka Leppäluoto – vocals
