= Follow Me into Madness =

Studio album by Tarot
- Released: April 1988
- Recorded: 1988
- Studio: Takomo Studios, Helsinki, Finland
- Genre: Heavy metal
- Length: 41:50
- Label: Flamingo Music
- Producer: Tarot, Kassu Halonen

Tarot chronology
Spell of Iron (1986)	Follow Me into Madness (1988)	To Live Forever (1993)

Remastered CD edition cover

Singles from Follow Me into Madness
- 1. "Rose on the Grave" / "I Don't Care Anymore" Released: 1988

Professional ratings
Review scores
Source	Rating
Collector's Guide to Heavy Metal	8/10

Follow Me into Madness is the second album by Finnish metal band Tarot, released in 1988 by Bluelight Records. A remastered version was released in 2006 by Spinefarm Records. Rose On The Grave was released as a single in 1988. This is also the last album with Mako H., as he is replaced by Janne Tolsa, the current keyboard player.

== Track listing ==
All music written by Marko and Zachary Hietala, all lyrics by Marko Hietala.

Side one

1. "Descendants of Power" – 3:50
2. "Rose on the Grave" – 4:31
3. "Lady Deceiver" – 3:38
4. "Follow Me into Madness" – 5:40
5. "Blood Runs Cold"/"Happy End" – 3:52

Side two

1. "No Return" – 4:30
2. "I Don't Care Anymore" – 3:48
3. "Breathing Fire" – 3:12
4. "I Spit Venom" – 3:14
5. "Shadow in My Heart" – 5:34

=== Remastered CD edition bonus tracks ===
11. "I Don't Care Anymore" (1995 Version) – 4:09
12. "Shadows in My Heart" (live) – 6:45
13. "Descendants of Power" (live) – 3:30
14. "In My Blood" (demo) – 4:00
15. "Born into the Flame" (demo) – 4:00

== Personnel ==
Tarot

- Marko Hietala – vocals, bass
- Zachary Hietala – guitars
- Mako H – guitars
- Pecu Cinnari – drums

Production

- Dan Tigerstedt – engineer, mixing
- Kassu Halonen – executive producer
- Mika Myyryläinen – reissue producer with Tarot
- Janne Tolsa – reissue producer, bonus track engineer and mixing
- Mikko Tegelman – bonus track engineer and mixing
- Mikko Karmila – bonus track engineer
