= Ruatokansan uamunkoetto =

Ruatokansan Uamunkoetto

Studio album by Verjnuarmu
- Released: May 18, 2008
- Genre: Melodic death metal
- Length: 41:53
- Label: Dynamic Arts Records
- Producer: Verjnuarmu; Tero Holopainen

Verjnuarmu chronology
Muanpiällinen helevetti (2006)	Ruatokansan Uamunkoetto (2008)

Ruatokansan Uamunkoetto ("Dawn of the Dead") is the second album by Savo band Verjnuarmu.

== Track listing ==
1. Tulesta Pimmeyven ('From the Fire of Darkness') - 3:47
2. Kuu Paestaa, Kuollu Ajjaa ('Moon Shines, The Dead Rides') - 4:47
3. Mustan Virran Silta ('Bridge of Black River') - 3:48
4. Luita Ja Hampaeta ('Bones and Teeth') - 3:00
5. Surmatun Säkkeet ('Phrases of the Slain') - 4:25
6. Huaskalinnut ('Vultures') - 4:31
7. Kuhtumattomat Vieraat ('Uninvited Guests') - 5:01
8. Kirkkomuan Kansoo ('People of the Churchground') - 4:11
9. Räähähenki ('Poltergeist') - 3:16
10. Kalamavesj' ('Deadly Water') - 5:07

== Chart positions ==
Ruatokansan Uamunkoetto reached No. 24 at its peak on the Finnish Albums Top 40 charts and was there for a week.

Chart	Position
Finland Albums Top 40	24

== Personnel ==
- Puijon Perkele - lead vocals
- Savon Surma - rhythm guitar, lead vocals
- Viitakemies - lead guitar, backing vocals
- Woema - bass guitar
- Musta Savo - drums, lead and backing vocals

=== Production ===
- Tero Holopainen - recording, mixing, and producing
- Kimmo Hämäläinen - mixing
- Dragan Tanaskovic - mastering
- Tarmo Luostarinen - artwork
