= Taking the Lead =

2002 studio album by Elias Viljanen

Studio album by Elias Viljanen
- Released: December 6, 2002
- Recorded: Phantom Studios, Finland
- Genre: Instrumental rock, progressive metal
- Length: 43:12
- Label: Lion Music
- Producer: Elias Viljanen

Elias Viljanen chronology
Taking the Lead (2002)	The Leadstar (2005)

Taking the Lead is the first solo album by Sonata Arctica guitarist Elias Viljanen. It was released in 2002 by Lion Music.

== Track listing ==
No.	Title	Length
1.	"Evoke the Spirit"	0:35
2.	"Evil Rock"	3:35
3.	"The Axemaster"	4:56
4.	"I Go Solo"	4:13
5.	"Northern Breeze"	3:20
6.	"Beyond Twilight"	4:08
7.	"Taking the Lead"	4:04
8.	"A Dream Come True"	3:33
9.	"Hyper Boogie"	3:29
10.	"Written in Stars"	1:55
11.	"Passion for Glory"	5:16
12.	"Speed of the Devil"	4:04
Total length:		43:12

== Credits ==
- Elias Viljanen – guitars
- Rami Herckman – bass guitar
- Tomi Ylönen – drums
- Tero Ylönen – keyboards (on track 1, 2, 3, 5, 8)
- Jani Kemppinen – keyboards (on track 6, 9, 11, 12)
