= Phoenix (Dreamtale album) =

Studio album by Dreamtale
- Released: June 4, 2008
- Recorded: 2006–2007
- Genre: Power metal
- Length: 50:11
- Label: Spinefarm

Dreamtale chronology
Difference (2005)	Phoenix (2008)	Epsilon (2011)

Singles from Phoenix
- 1. "Payback" Released: January 28, 2008; 2. "Take What the Heavens Create" Released: June 6, 2008

Phoenix is the fourth studio album by Finnish power metal band Dreamtale. It is their first album with vocalist Erkki Seppänen, guitarist Seppo Kolehmainen, and keyboardist Akseli Kaasalainen, their only one with drummer Arto Pitkänen until he rejoined in 2017, and their last one with bassist Pasi Ristolainen. The band started writing and recording the album in 2006.

== Track listing ==
1. "Yesterday's News" – 3:33
2. "Eyes of the Clown" – 4:43
3. "Payback" – 4:44
4. "Failed States" – 3:49
5. "Take What the Heavens Create" – 2:53
6. "Great Shadow" – 5:15
7. "No Angels No More" – 3:46
8. "Faceless Men" – 4:16
9. "Firebird" – 3:47
10. "The Vigilante" – 4:46
11. "Lady Dragon" (Bonus Track) – 4:15
12. "Between Love and Hate" (Bonus Track) – 4:05

== Personnel ==
- Erkki Seppänen – vocals
- Rami Keränen – guitar
- Seppo Kolehmainen – guitar
- Akseli Kaasalainen – keyboards
- Pasi Ristolainen – bass
- Arto Pitkänen – drums
