= Gravity of Light =

Studio album by Tarot
- Released: 10 March 2010
- Genre: Heavy metal
- Length: 49:42
- Label: King Foo Entertainment

Tarot chronology
Crows Fly Black (2006)	Gravity of Light (2010)	The Spell of Iron MMXI (2011)

Professional ratings
Review scores
Source	Rating
Lords of Metal	(78/100)
Fury Rocks	(8.4/10)

Gravity of Light is the eighth studio album by the Finnish heavy metal band Tarot. It was released in Finland on 10 March 2010, in Europe on 23 April 2010 and in the US on 8 June 2010.

== Track listing ==
1. "Satan Is Dead" – 4:12
2. "Hell Knows" – 6:05
3. "Rise!" – 4:30
4. "Pilot of All Dreams" – 3:42
5. "Magic and Technology" – 5:48
6. "Calling Down the Rain" – 4:11
7. "Caught in the Deadlights" – 4:41
8. "I Walk Forever" – 4:49
9. "Sleep in the Dark" – 4:41
10. "Gone" – 7:03
11. "End of Everything" (bonus track) – 3:48

== Singles ==
- "I Walk Forever" (digital only)

== Charts ==
Chart (2010)	Peak position
Finnish Albums (Suomen virallinen lista)	2

== Credits ==
- Marko Hietala – vocals & backing vocals, bass, acoustic guitar
- Zachary Hietala – guitars
- Janne Tolsa – keyboards
- Pecu Cinnari – drums
- Tommi Salmela – samples, vocals & backing vocals
