= Firebreather (game) =

Play-by-mail fantasy game

- Publishers: Horizon Games
- Years active: 1990s
- Genres: heroic fantasy, play-by-mail
- Languages: English
- Playing time: unlimited (some versions), fixed (one version)
- Materials required: Instructions, order sheets, turn results, paper, pencil
- Media type: Play-by-mail or email

Firebreather is a heroic fantasy, play-by-mail (PBM) game.

== History and development ==
Firebreather was a computer moderated, fantasy play-by-mail game. It was published by Horizon Games. Its initial two versions were open-ended, while the third version changed to closed-ended. A subsequent fourth version returned to the open-ended format.

== Gameplay ==
Players led six character parties. Character types included druids, dwarves, elves, knights, pilgrims, swordsmen, sorcerers, woodsmen, witches, and wizards.

== Reception ==
Reviewer Trey Stone, in the July–August 1997 issue of Paper Mayhem magazine stated that it "is not the perfect fantasy comp mod adventure game. But it is damn close. And as a game, I cannot recommend it more strongly". Joey Browning reviewed the game in a 1995 issue of Flagship, providing a generally poor review, noting it was a good game for beginners. On a scale of ten, he rated the game a 3 for Anticipation, a 2 for Depth and Interaction, 8 for the Gamemaster, and a 4 for Value.

== See also ==
- List of play-by-mail games

== Bibliography ==
- Browning, Joey (January–February 1995). "Firebreather Revisited – Mugger PBM?". Flagship. No. 53 (US ed.). pp. 12–13.
- Driskill, Malcolm (July–August 1997). "Firebreather: The Wolfpack Challenge". Paper Mayhem. No. 85. pp. 10–12.
- Driskill, Malcolm (March–April 1997). "Firebreather: Beginner Strategy". Paper Mayhem. No. 83. pp. 8–9.
- Kelly, Nathaniel (September–October 1997). "An Overview of Firebreather". Paper Mayhem. No. 86. pp. 18–19.
- Rodgers, Patrick M. (January–February 1994). "Ship Ahoy! New PBM Games Spotted". Shadis. No. 11. p. 77.
- Stone, Trey (March–April 1997). "Firebreather: Computer Moderated Fantasy Adventure Done Right". Paper Mayhem. No. 83. pp. 4–7.
