= Muanpiällinen helevetti =

Studio album by Verjnuarmu
- Released: January 25, 2006
- Genre: Melodic death metal
- Length: 39:59
- Label: Mercury Records; Universal Records

Verjnuarmu chronology
Muanpiällinen helevetti (2006)	Ruatokansan uamunkoetto (2008)

Muanpiällinen helevetti ("Hell on Earth") is the debut album by the Finnish melodic death metal band Verjnuarmu.

== Track listing ==
1. "Kurjuuvven valssi" ("Waltz of Misery") - 2:57
2. "Vihankylyväjä" ("Hate-Sower") - 3:51
3. "Noetavaeno" ("Witch-Hunt") - 3:38
4. "Jäläkeläenen" ("Descendant") - 3:34
5. "Tuljmyrskyt" ("Firestorms") - 4:01
6. "Itkuvirsj'" ("Dirge") - 3:13
7. "Kuuvven sylen syvvyyvessä" ("Six Fathom Deep") - 4:24
8. "Kalaman kalapee" ("Deathly Pale") - 2:30
9. "Laalavat jouset" ("Singing Bows") - 5:02
10. "Kärähtäny kylä" ("Charred Village") - 6:49

== Chart performance ==
Muanpiällinen helevetti reached the #7 spot at its peak on the Finnish Albums Top 40 charts and was there for two weeks.

Chart	Position
Finland Albums Top 40	7
