= Marko Hietala =

Finnish musician

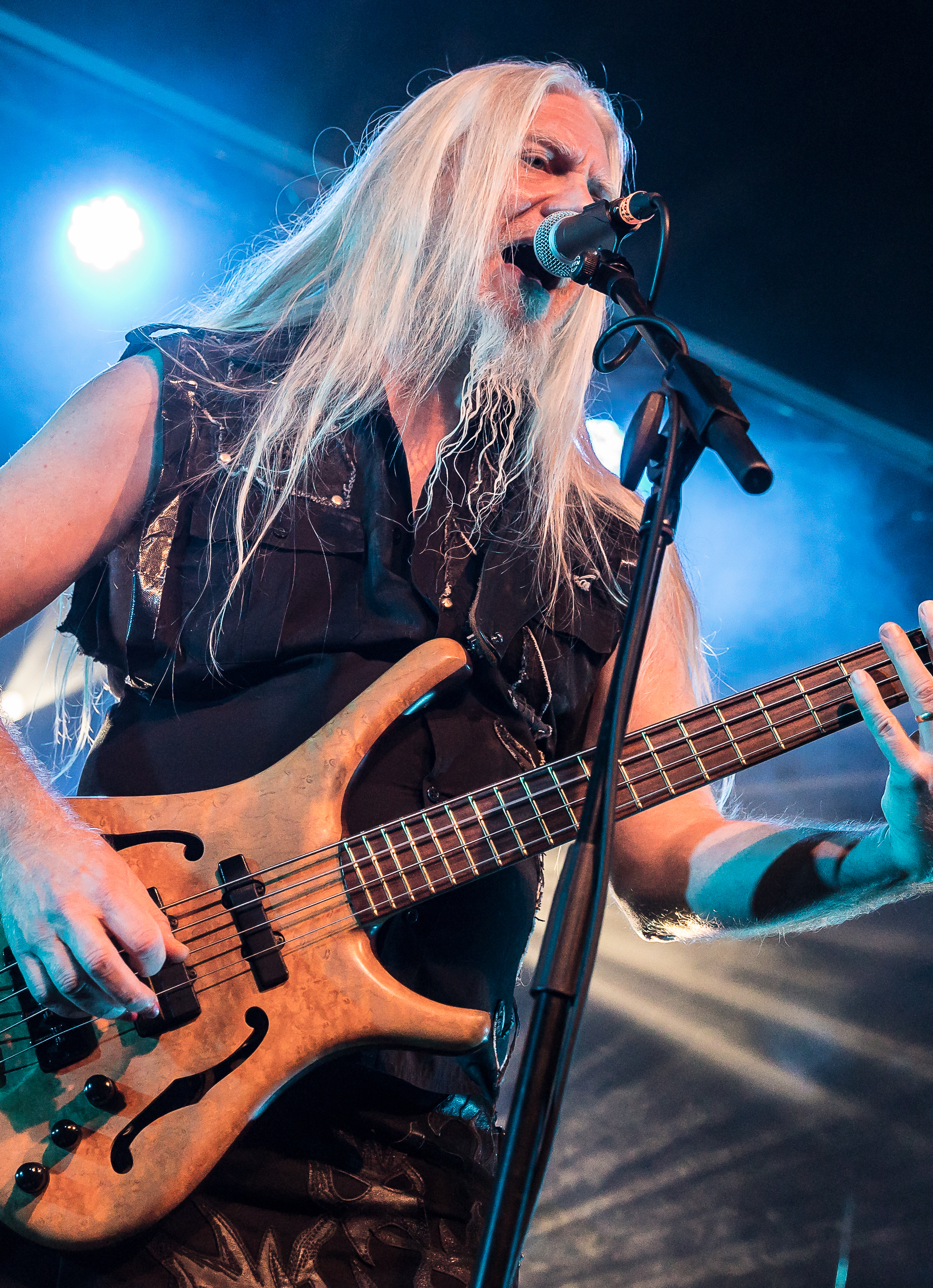
- Hietala in 2024

Background information
- Born: Marko Tapani Hietala; 14 January 1966 (age 60); Tervo, Finland
- Genres: Heavy metal; symphonic metal; power metal; progressive rock
- Occupations: Musician, songwriter, producer
- Instruments: Vocals, bass, guitar
- Years active: 1984–present
- Member of: Tarot; Northern Kings
- Formerly of: Nightwish; Sinergy; Sapattivuosi

Marko Tapani "Marco" Hietala (born 14 January 1966) is a Finnish heavy metal musician. Internationally, he is best known as the former bassist, male vocalist and secondary composer to Tuomas Holopainen, of the symphonic metal band Nightwish. He is also the vocalist and bassist as well as composer and lyricist for the heavy metal band Tarot.

He is also a member of the supergroup Northern Kings, and portrayed one of the main characters in Ayreon's 2013 album The Theory of Everything.

== Biography ==
Marko Hietala was born in Tervo, and is the youngest child of the Hietala family. Hietala lived in Tervo until the age of 15, after which he moved to Kuopio to study classical guitar, vocals and musical theory in high school. In 1984, he and his brother Zachary formed the heavy metal band Tarot under the name Purgatory. In 1986, Tarot received a deal for their first album and went on tour. Before becoming a full-time musician, he worked as a live and studio sound engineer.

While on tour with Tarot in 1998, Marko had met the members of the band Nightwish in Siilinjärvi as they were an opening act for his band. Marko recalled having watched their performance: "I watched their show and thought their music was actually quite good at times. They had all this force and drama, so maybe some day they would successfully combine the two. But goddamn, they looked absolutely horrible on stage. Shorthaired guys just standing there – Tarja was a pretty girl but just as petrified, shrieking in the middle of the stage in her leather pants. Honestly, I assumed them to be just a momentary fad and thought they will fade away after six months or so. Luckily, of course, I was so wrong."

=== 2001–2020: Nightwish ===
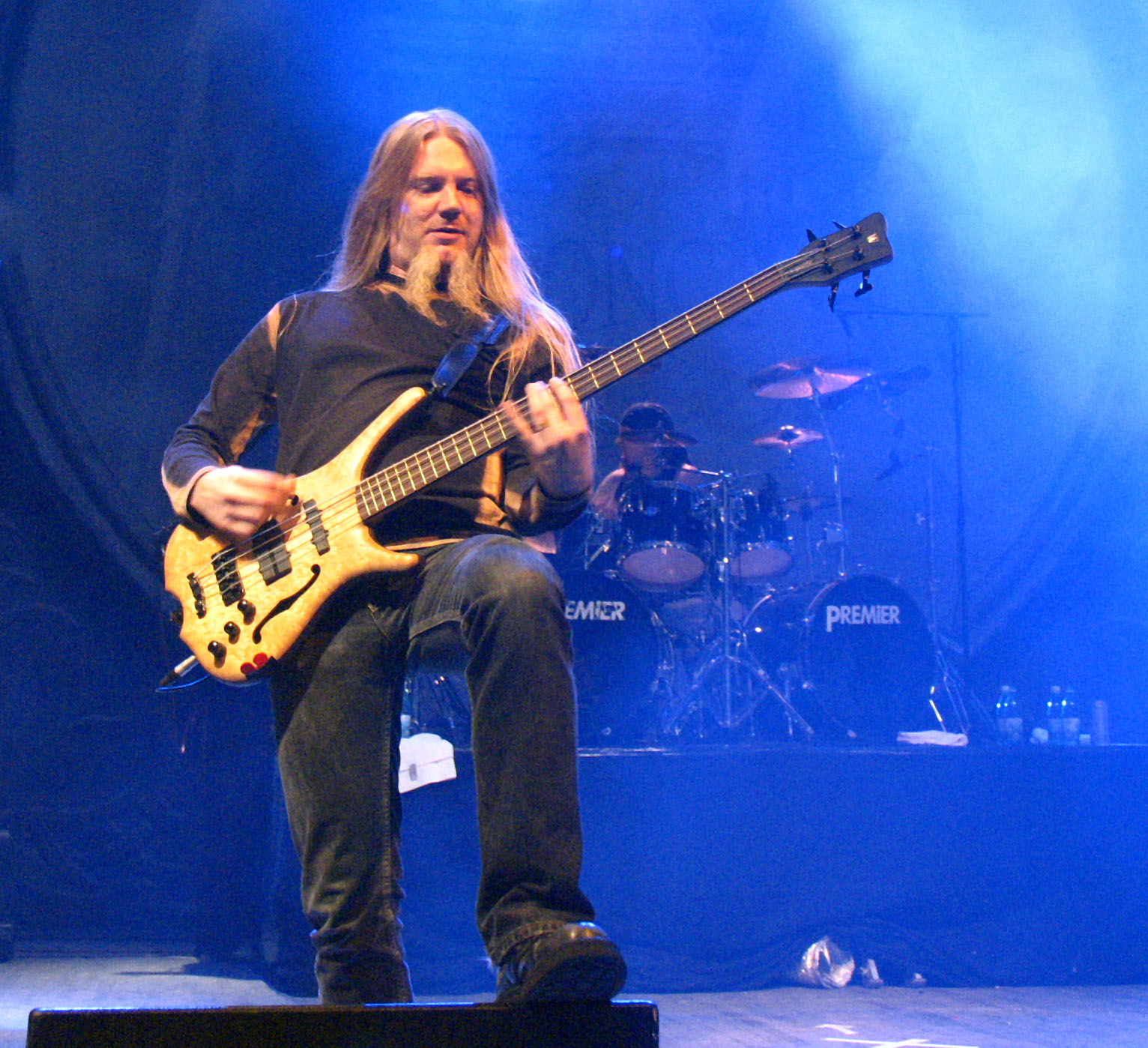
Hietala was Nightwish's bassist from 2002 to 2021.

Hietala joined Nightwish in 2001 when Tuomas Holopainen and the band's manager called him and said that there would be a place in the band for a vocalist and a bass player. Century Child was his first Nightwish album, following the departure of previous bassist Sami Vänskä. He was a prominent guest musician in Delain, a project involving many members of the gothic and symphonic metal community. He also participated in the recording of Invitation, by Altaria, providing backing vocals. Hietala has also been part of the bands Sinergy and Northern Kings.

Upon his arrival in Nightwish, several songs were written to feature duets with then Nightwish vocalist Tarja Turunen, allowing songwriter and band leader Tuomas Holopainen to take advantage of Hietala's distinctive raucous voice to add a new dimension to the band. A famous example is Nightwish's cover of "The Phantom of the Opera", from the album "Century Child".

During Nightwish's shows, Turunen would take a break halfway through the set. Before Hietala joined the band, the band would perform an instrumental song during this time. After Hietala joined the band, they performed covers of well-known songs, with Hietala singing the lead vocal part in this break. The band has performed Ozzy Osbourne's "Crazy Train", W.A.S.P.'s "Wild Child", Dio's "Don't Talk to Strangers", Megadeth's "Symphony of Destruction" and Pink Floyd's "High Hopes". Some of these songs have been put up for sale as well on various Nightwish album releases. Following Turunen's departure from Nightwish, Hietala was much more involved with the production of Dark Passion Play, which was released in September 2007. He sang some songs, completely, and wrote the music for the song "The Islander", on which he also plays acoustic guitar instead of bass. Hietala is also credited alongside Holopainen for co-writing the song "The Crow, the Owl and the Dove" from Nightwish's 2011 album, Imaginaerum.

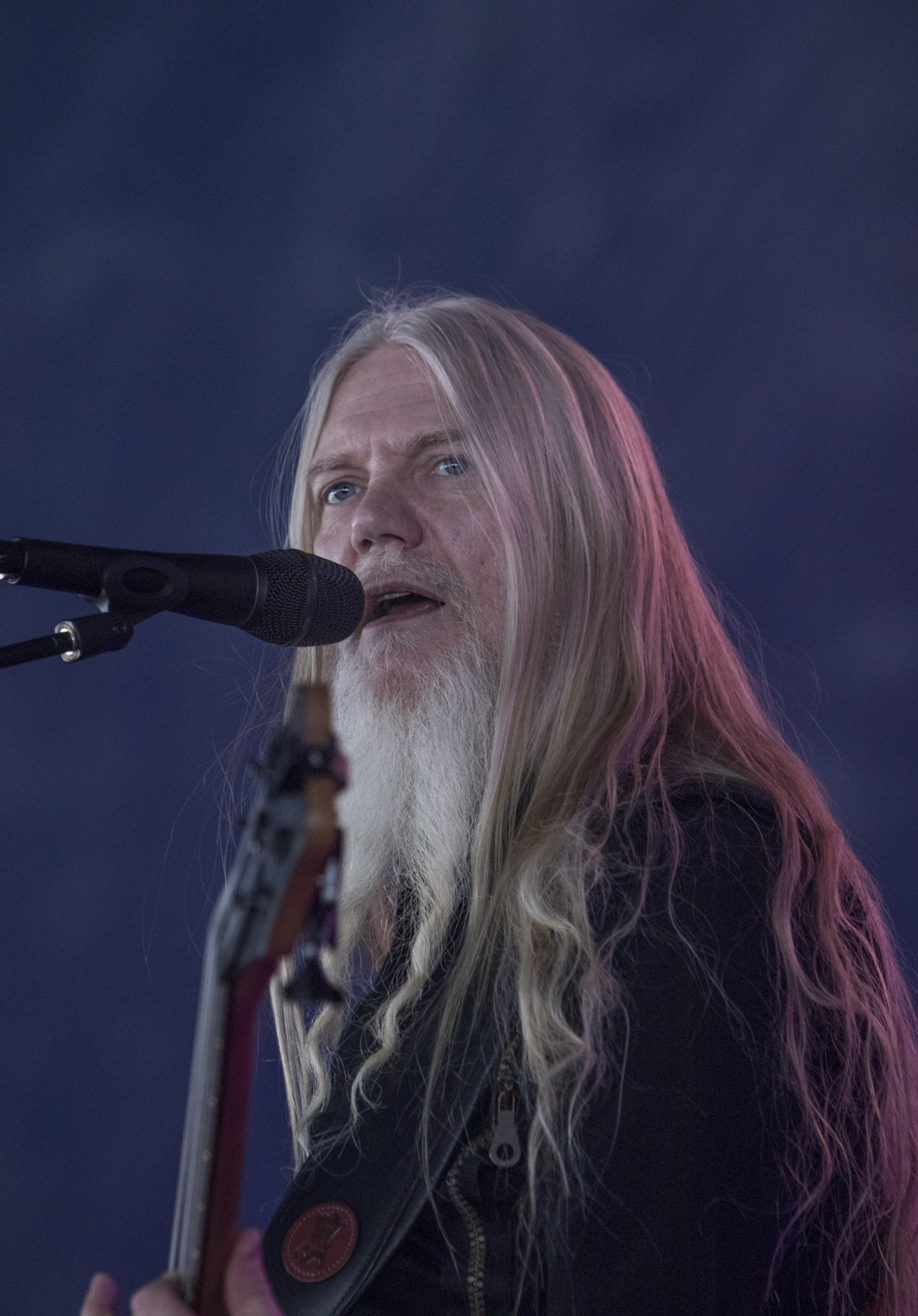
Hietala in 2019

In Delain, Hietala played bass for the album Lucidity and was also the main male vocalist on the album with featured vocals on the song The Gathering. He is also featured as vocalist in two of the songs on Delain's second album April Rain and two songs from Delain's fourth album The Human Contradiction.

In March 2009, Hietala joined the band Sapattivuosi. They cover Black Sabbath songs in Finnish. In this band, however, Hietala does not play bass; he only performs vocals.

On 1 April 2010 it was said that Hietala would leave the band to concentrate on a choir career. This was identified as an April Fool's joke, but was also a reference to his participation in Kuorosota (the localized Finnish version of Clash of the Choirs) in 2010. Hietala was the master of the Kuopio choir in the program's second season. He came second in the contest, losing in the finals to the Joensuu choir, headed by pop rock singer Ilkka Alanko. Tarot's single "I Walk Forever", from the Gravity of Light album, was performed for the first time by Hietala, Tommi Salmela and the Kuopio choir during Kuorosota 2010; other songs performed included "The Phantom of the Opera", which Hietala has covered with Nightwish as well.

In June 2010, Hietala joined the heavy metal supergroup HAIL! on two occasions, performing Black Sabbath's Neon Knights with Ripper Owens, Andreas Kisser, James LoMenzo and Paul Bostaph at two of their shows in Finland.

On 14 August 2013, Hietala was the first singer to be confirmed by Arjen Lucassen to guest on Ayreon's new album The Theory of Everything. In 2017 he joined Ayreon on stage for three shows at 013 Poppodium in Tilburg, the recording of these shows was later released as Ayreon's live album Ayreon Universe – The Best of Ayreon Live.

Hietala released his first solo album Mustan sydämen rovio in May 2019. He released the album under his birthname Marko Hietala and will be using the name also in his other projects in the future. Hietala has described his solo material as "hard prog". An English version of the album, titled Pyre of the Black Heart (Nuclear Blast), followed in January 2020. Joining him on the albums are drummer Anssi Nykänen, keyboardist Vili Ollila and guitarist Tuomas Wäinölä with whom he also toured in Finland in the summer and autumn of 2019. The band embarked on a European tour in February 2020.

In 2020, he participated in and won the Finnish edition of Masked Singer.

=== 2021–present: Departure from Nightwish, solo career ===
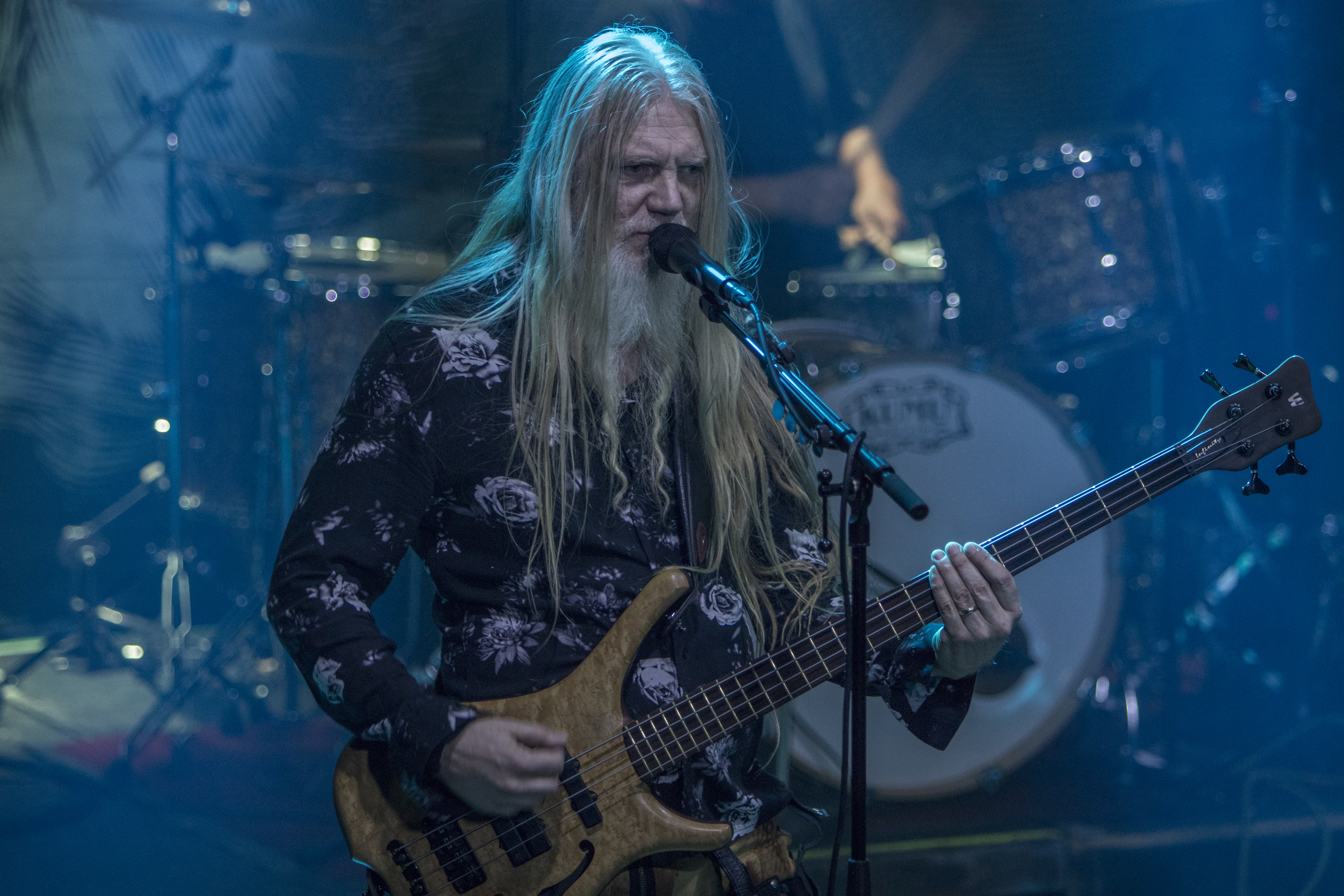
Hietala performing in Tavastia with his band in 2019.

In December 2020, Hietala told Nightwish he had decided to leave to focus on other projects. He had been suffering from several mental disorders, including depression, for a decade. Despite medication, he had kept on getting worse. After the recording of Human. :II: Nature. and in part due to the respite brought by COVID-19 pandemic, Hietala finally reached the conclusion that leaving the band would prevent his illnesses from worsening. On 12 January 2021, Hietala made his departure public and announced his withdrawal from the public eye. Ten days later, Swedish symphonic metal band Therion released a music video for the song "Tuonela" that featured Hietala.

On 18 June 2022, Northern Kings made a comeback that ended their 12-year hiatus and Hietala's 17-month break from the public. The band played at the 'Tuhdimmat Tahdit festival' in Nokia, Finland. Hietala later in an interview, stated that he has not made contact with the members of Nightwish since his departure from the band in January 2021, and expressed uncertainty that he will be returning to Nightwish. In an interview in October 2023, Hietala expressed doubt that he would ever return to Nightwish.

Hietala performed with his solo band at Z7 Summer Nights Open Air in Pratteln, Switzerland on 8 July 2023, later joining former Nightwish bandmate Tarja Turunen at her solo show later in the evening to sing "The Phantom of the Opera" with her. It was the first time they had sung the song together, after Tarja was fired from Nightwish in 2005. They also performed the song at Olavinlinna in Finland. They toured together in 2024 in both Latin America and Europe on Tarja's "Living The Dream – The Hits Tour". While both Hietala and Turunen released a collaborative single titled "Left on Mars" on 13 March 2024, Hietala stated that he has not ruled out the possibility of him and Turunen starting a new band together. Hietala released the single, "Frankenstein's Wife", on 4 September 2024. On 26 November 2024, the third single, "Impatient Zero" was released, simultaneously with the announcement of Hietala's second solo album Roses from the Deep which was released on 7 February 2025.

Hietala participated in Season 15 of the Finnish TV show "Vain elämää" in 2024.

== Influences ==
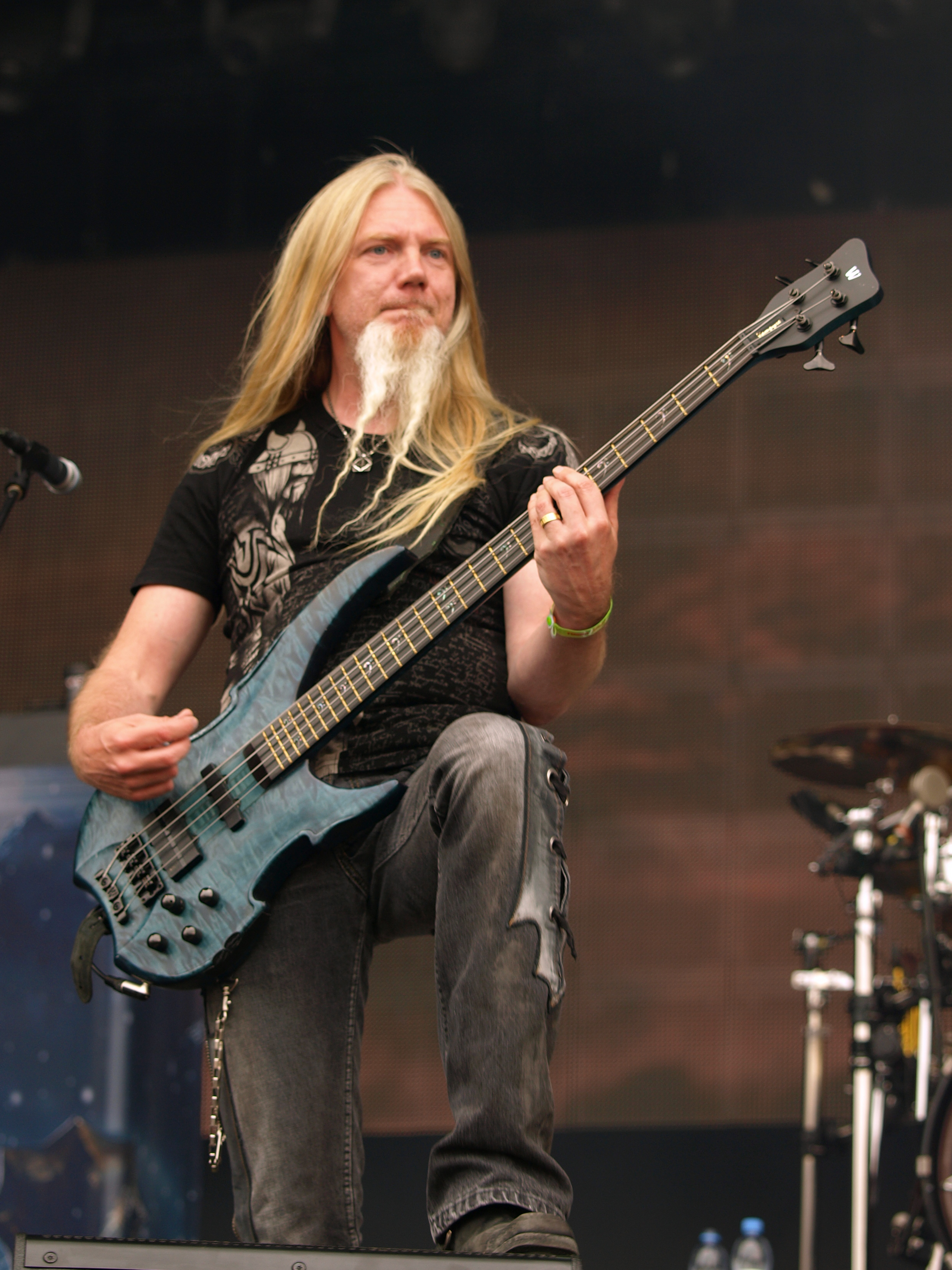
Hietala in 2013

Hietala has stated that the biggest influence on him as a bassist is Geezer Butler and Bob Daisley, while Ronnie James Dio and Rob Halford are his biggest influence as a vocalist. He has also stated that he listens to wide array of music ranging from "really sensitive stuff to a lot of really hard stuff", saying that he "tend[s] to soak up almost everything" which "somehow ends up being used" when he writes his own music.

How is your musical taste towards metal music / other genres?

— Question on the official Tarot website (2006)

Anything works for me, if it's good enough. I'm mainly a metalhead, but I have this basic respect for any kind of music. Writing and listening to music would become stale if I couldn't draw influences from other styles too.

— Marko's answer

== Personal life ==
Hietala has two children with his ex-wife Manki, twin boys Antto and Miro (born in 2001). They lived in Kuopio, Finland. When he is not touring, he enjoys reading books, playing video games, and watching movies. He especially likes fantasy, horror and science fiction books. In 2016, a Finnish newspaper reported that Hietala had filed for divorce. In August 2018, he married Camila (Cavalcanti) Hietala. He and his wife have a daughter and live in Spain.

Born Marko, Hietala has been regularly credited throughout his career as Marco. He said he adopted the version with "c" when he was young and trying to sound "cool". Starting with Mustan Sydämen Rovio, he will be credited as Marko. He also referred to the "Marco" spelling as "the last lie I had constructed about myself".

== Discography ==
Studio albums:

- Mustan sydämen rovio – 2019 (re-released in English in 2020 as Pyre of the Black Heart)
- Roses from the Deep – 2025

=== Nightwish ===
Studio albums:

- Century Child – 2002
- Once – 2004
- Dark Passion Play – 2007
- Imaginaerum – 2011
- Endless Forms Most Beautiful – 2015
- Human. :II: Nature. – 2020

=== Northern Kings ===
Studio albums:

- Reborn – 2007
- Rethroned – 2008

=== Sapattivuosi ===
Studio albums:

- Ihmisen merkki – 2009

=== Sinergy ===
Studio albums:

- To Hell and Back – 2000
- Suicide by My Side – 2002

=== Raskasta joulua ===
Studio albums:

- Raskasta Joulua – 2004
- Raskaampaa joulua – 2006
- Raskasta Joulua – 2013
- Ragnarok Juletide – 2014
- Raskasta Joulua 2 – 2014
- Raskasta Joulua Tulkoon joulu - akustisesti – 2015
- Raskasta Joulua IV – 2017
- Viides Adventti – 2022

=== Conquest ===
Studio albums:

- Worlds Apart – 1999
- The Harvest – 2011

== Collaborations and projects ==
=== As guest/session member ===
1990

- Warmath – Gehenna – (backing vocals, keyboards)

1999

- To/Die/For – All Eternity – (backing vocals)

2001

- Gandalf – Rock Hell – (backing vocals)
- To/Die/For – Epilogue – (backing vocals)

2002

- Dreamtale – Beyond Reality – (vocals on "Heart's Desire" & "Where the Rainbow Ends")
- Virtuocity – Secret Visions – (vocals on "Eye for an Eye" & "Speed of Light")

2003

- Aina – Days of Rising Doom – (vocals)
- Altaria – Invitation – (backing vocals)
- Charon – The Dying Daylights – (backing vocals)
- Evemaster – Wither – (vocals on "Wings of Darkness (Tarot cover)")

2004

- Shade Empire – Sinthetic – (vocals on "Human Sculpture")
- Timo Rautiainen & Trio Niskalaukaus – Kylmä tila (vocals on "Älkää selvittäkö" & "Samarialainen")

2005

- Turmion Kätilöt – Niuva 20 – (backing vocals on "Stormbringer (Deep Purple cover)")

2006

- After Forever – Mea Culpa – (vocals on single version of "Face Your Demons")
- Amorphis – Eclipse – (backing vocals)
- Defuse – Defuse – (vocals on "DIB")
- Delain – Lucidity – (vocals on 5 tracks, bass guitars)
- Eternal Tears of Sorrow – Before the Bleeding Sun – (backing vocals)
- Stoner Kings – Fuck the World – (backing vocals)
- Verjnuarmu – Muanpiällinen Helevetti – (backing vocals)

2007

- Amorphis – Silent Waters – (backing vocals)
- Nuclear Blast All-Stars: Into the Light – (vocals on "Inner Sanctuary")
- Machine Men – Circus of Fools – (vocals on "The Cardinal Point")

2008

- Ebony Ark – Decoder 2.0 – (vocals on 5 tracks)

2009

- Amorphis – Skyforger – (backing vocals)
- Delain – April Rain – (vocals on "Control the Storm" & "Nothing Left")
- Marenne – The Past Prelude – (backing vocals)
- Elias Viljanen – Fire-Hearted – (vocals on "Last Breath of Love")
- Turmion Kätilöt – Lentävä KalPan Ukko – (backing vocals)
- Turmion Kätilöt – Verkko Heiluu – (backing vocals)

2010

- Erja Lyytinen – Voracious Love – (vocals on "Bed of Roses")

2011

- Grönholm – Silent Out Loud – (Vocals on ″Vanity″)

2012

- Delain – We Are the Others – (vocals on two bonus live tracks on the Digipak version)

2013

- A2Z – Parasites of Paradise – (acoustic guitar on "Nightcrawler", "Caterpillar" & "Praying Mantis")
- Ayreon – The Theory of Everything – (vocals)
- Turmion Kätilöt – Technodiktator – (backing vocals on "Jalopiina")
- Lazy Bonez – Vol.1 – (duet with Udo Dirkschneider on First to Go – Last to Know)

2014

- Delain – The Human Contradiction – (vocals on "Your Body Is a Battleground" & "Sing to Me")

2016

- Avantasia – Ghostlights – (vocals on "Master of the Pendulum")

2018

- Ayreon – Ayreon Universe – The Best of Ayreon Live – (vocals)
- Dark Sarah – The Golden Moth – (vocals on "The Gods Speak")

2019

- Delain – Hunter's Moon – (vocals on the live tracks)

2020

- Jupiterium – 'King of Spades', a tribute song to Lemmy – (vocals)

2021

- Therion – Leviathan – (vocals on "Tuonela")
- Circus of Rock – Come One, Come All – (vocals on "Sheriff of Ghost Town")
- Waltari – 3rd Decade - Anniversary Edition – (vocals on "Below Zero")
- Mika Jaakola – Dark Slide Inc. – (vocals on Soita)

2022

- HiSQ – Flesh and Blood – (vocals)

2023

- Delain – Dark Waters – (vocals on "Invictus")
- Exit Eden – Run! – (vocals)
- Bjørkø – Whitebone Wind – (vocals)

2024

- Epik Pike – Dangerous – (bass)
- Patty Gurdy – I am with You – (vocals)

2026

- Tarja Turunen – Frisson Noir – (bass and vocals on "Leap of Faith")

=== In-studio ===
Amorphis

- Far from the Sun (2003) – producer
- Eclipse (2006) – producer
- Silent Waters (2007) – producer
- Skyforger (2009) – producer
- The Beginning of Times (2011) – producer

Warmath

- Gehenna (1990) – producer
- Damnation Play (1991) – producer
