= Spell of Iron =

Studio album by Tarot
- Released: December 1986
- Recorded: 1986
- Studio: MTV Studios, Helsinki, Finland
- Genre: Heavy metal
- Length: 39:44
- Label: Flamingo Music
- Producer: Kassu Halonen

Tarot chronology
Spell of Iron (1986)	Follow Me into Madness (1988)

Singles from Spell of Iron
- 1. "Wings of Darkness" / "Back in the Fire" Released: April 1986; 2. "Love's Not Made for My Kind" / "Things That Crawl at Night" Released: December 1986

Professional ratings
Review scores
Source	Rating
Collector's Guide to Heavy Metal	8/10

Spell of Iron is the debut album by Finnish metal band Tarot, released in 1986 by Flamingo Music. It was released on CD in 1994 by Bluelight Records, and a remastered version was released in 2006 by Spinefarm Records.

The album includes the band's most popular song, "Wings of Darkness". Tarot's website is named after the song.

== Track listing ==
All music written by Marko and Zachary Hietala, all lyrics by Marko Hietala.

Side one

1. "Midwinter Nights" – 4:35
2. "Dancing on the Wire" – 3:11
3. "Back in the Fire" – 5:38
4. "Love's Not Made for My Kind" – 3:28
5. "Never Forever" – 3:16

Side two

6. "Spell of Iron" – 3:32
7. "De Mortui Nil Nisi Bene" (instrumental) – 3:29
8. "Pharao" – 3:01
9. "Wings of Darkness" – 3:40
10. "Things That Crawl at Night" – 5:54

=== Remastered CD edition bonus tracks ===
11. "Love's Not Made for My Kind" (1995 version) – 4:00
12. "Back in the Fire" (live) – 5:39
13. "Love's Not Made for My Kind" (live) – 3:20
14. "Back in the Fire" (single version) – 5:39
15. "I Don't Care Anymore" (demo) – 3:42
16. "Lady Deceiver" (demo) – 3:50
17. "Blood Runs Cold" (demo) – 2:49

== Personnel ==
Tarot

- Marko Hietala – lead vocals, bass, synthesizer on track 10
- Zachary Hietala – lead guitars, backing vocals
- Mako H. – rhythm guitars, lead guitar on track 8, backing vocals
- Pecu Cinnari – drums, backing vocals

Production

- Kassu Halonen – producer, synthesizer on track 4, backing vocals on track 8
- Jari Laasanen – engineer, mixing
- Mika Myyryläinen – reissue producer with Tarot
- Janne Tolsa – reissue producer, bonus tracks engineer and mixing
- Mikko Tegelman – bonus tracks engineer and mixing
- Mikko Karmila – bonus tracks engineer
