= Elias Viljanen =

Finnish guitarist

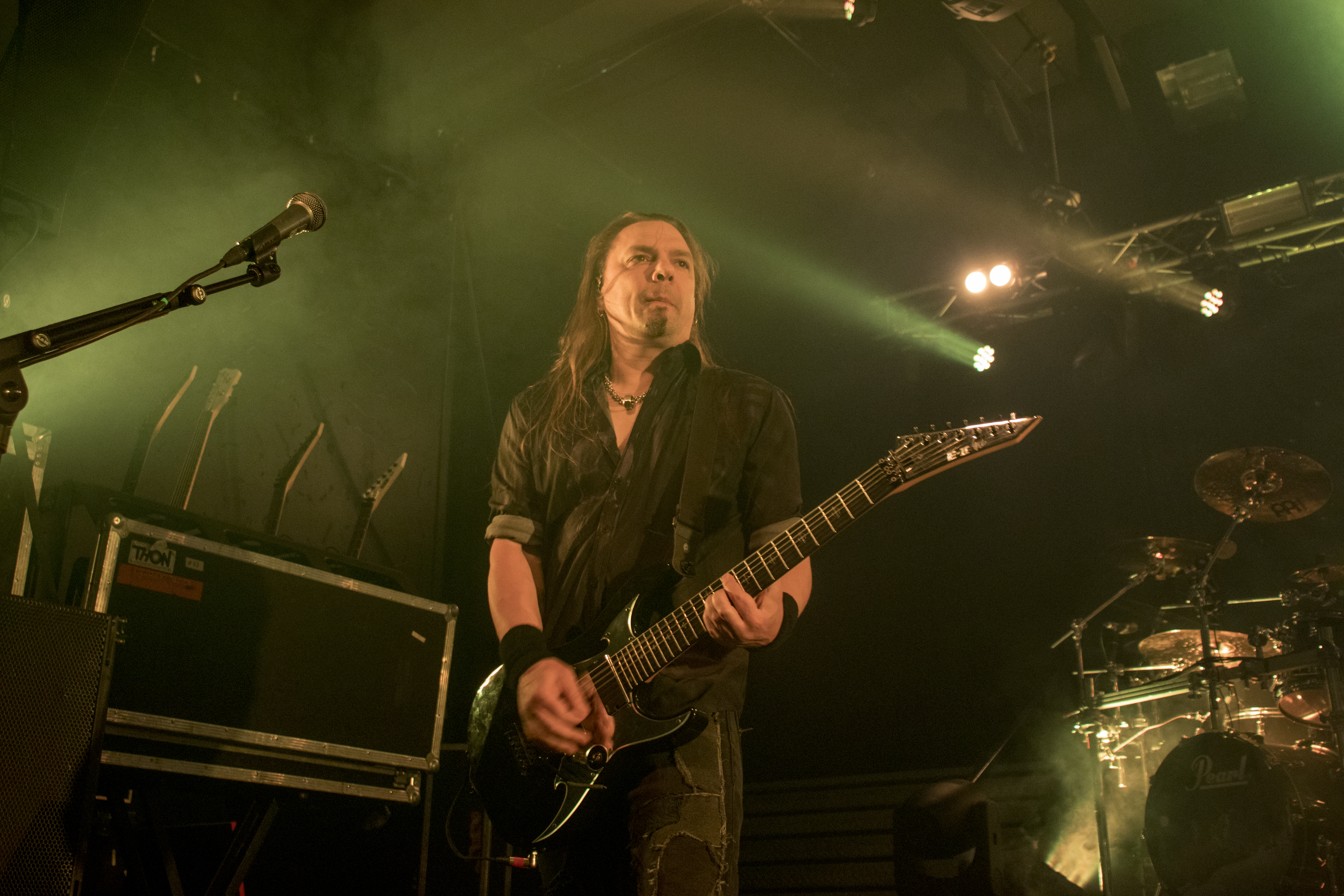
- Elias Viljanen performing with Sonata Arctica in 2019

Background information
- Born: 8 July 1975 (age 51)
- Origin: Finland
- Genres: Power metal, progressive metal, death metal, thrash metal
- Occupation: Lead guitarist
- Instruments: Guitar, vocals
- Formerly of: Twilight Lamp; Elias Viljanen & Evil Spirit; Sonata Arctica

Elias "E.Vil" Einari Johannes Viljanen (born 8 July 1975) is a Finnish musician from Tampere, Finland, known for being the guitarist for Sonata Arctica since 2007. Viljanen joined Sonata Arctica in spring 2007 in order to replace Jani Liimatainen, who left the band in August 2007 to fulfill his civil duties in Finland. The decision was only made official on 8 August 2007, but Elias Viljanen had been known to replace Liimatainen in concerts during the spring and summer tour. Viljanen cites Kiss, Metallica, Slayer, and Whitesnake as his musical influences.

== Biography ==
=== Early life ===
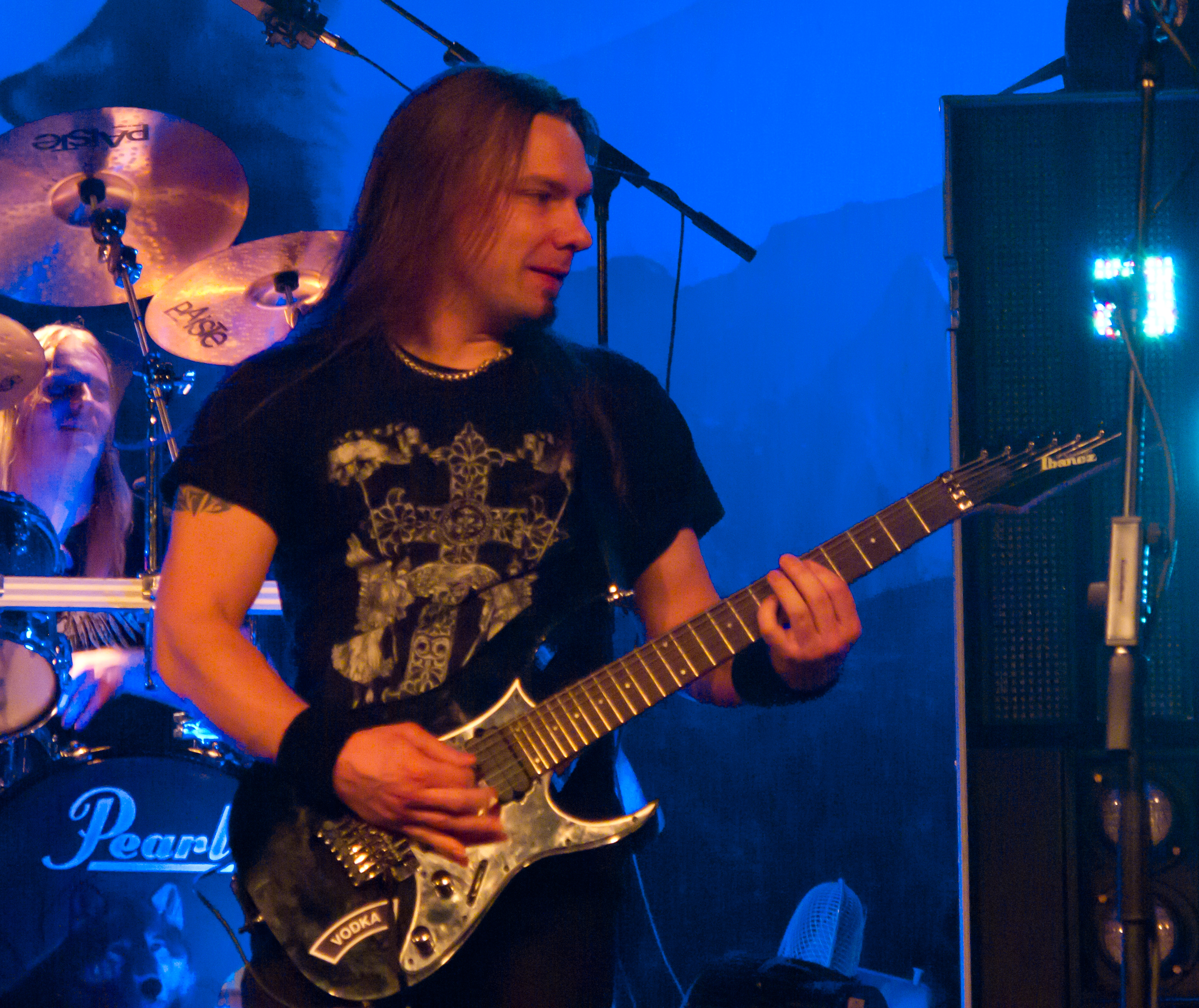
Elias Viljanen performing with Sonata Arctica in 2011.

Viljanen was born in 1975, and started playing the guitar at eight, in 1983. Initially, he says that he began playing "because his dad forced him... and, of course, I wanted to be like Kiss." He got his first acoustic guitar a year later, but did not get an electric guitar until nearly four years later. After finally convincing his parents to let him purchase his first electric guitar (a white Leadstar), he took a few guitar lessons and learned some basic chords, but believed that if he wanted to learn rock'n'roll, it would be something he would have to teach himself. Around that same time, Viljanen began playing in local bands, heavily influenced by Metallica's early thrash metal.

At age seventeen, his band Depravity was signed by Adipocere Records, this being Viljanen's first record contract.

In the early 1990s, Viljanen was introduced to the music of Steve Vai and Joe Satriani, but initially wrote it off as "just music for sports." As time went by, however, he developed a love of Satriani's music, calling it the "bluesiest rock'n'roll," and considers Vai "God." Viljanen also lists Dream Theater as his progressive metal influence that pushed him towards the style he is today. A little later he became a drummer in a band called Twilight Lamp, which released EP "Grandiose" in 1999.

=== Formation of Elias Viljanen and Evil Spirit ===
As 2001 approached, Viljanen felt that he had to get his own project going. He spent several months writing down his music ideas he'd had for many years, but never expressed. He did have doubts, however, about his solo project, stating:

Earlier, I thought I wasn't ready for this kind of project because, when people listen to shred music, they are usually thinking 'This guy ain't fast enough" or 'He's just copying someone else.' Maybe I was a bit afraid of what people would think of me. But I wanted to do it, and I wanted it to be as close to perfect as possible.

To prepare for his three-demo, The Axe-Master, Viljanen practiced for 2–3 hours each day for nearly four months. While he may have had doubts before, they were now erased, as the demos and recording became both a dream and an obsession. Viljanen never dreamed of getting a serious record contract out of it, but sent his demos out anyway. The record company Lion Music, however, replied and offered him a recording contract. Thus, eighteen years after the dream began, Elias Viljanen's first album, Taking the Lead was born.

Feedback for Taking the Lead was overall positive, placing in the top ten hard rock/shred CD's at guitar9.com in 2003. Steve Vai himself also got Viljanen's CD, and gave him some encouraging feedback as well. In 2004, Lion Music again offered Viljanen a record contract when he sent in new demos, and he entered the Studios with Evil Spirit in early 2005. Recording went well, and he emerged satisfied with the completion of his second solo album, The Leadstar.

=== Sonata Arctica and recent work ===
Elias Viljanen traveled with the band Sonata Arctica in 2007, filling in for their guitarist Jani Liimatainen on tour. On August 8, Sonata Arctica formally released a letter naming Viljanen the official guitarist in Sonata Arctica. Liimatainen had apparently not been fulfilling his mandatory civic duties as declared by the Finnish government, and this had caused a rift between him and the other members of the band. Viljanen took up the mantle as guitarist with much controversy, with many hard-core fans still wanting Liimatainen to be a part of the project. But Sonata Arctica were adamant, as was Liimatainen, and Viljanen thus maintained his status.

Viljanen toured with Sonata Arctica in support of their album Unia in late 2007 and early 2008. During the time off from tour in 2008, he began work on his third studio album, but the recording of Sonata Arctica's sixth studio album. So, Viljanen entered the studio with Sonata Arctica for the first time in the earlier half of 2009, recording the album The Days of Grays. As they were touring at the time of the release, Viljanen did not get to begin recording work on his album until early 2009. Later that year, his third studio album with Evil Spirit was released, Fire-Hearted.

== Personal life ==
Viljanen has stated that, if not a musician, he would likely be a silversmith. He enjoys the racing video game Need for Speed: Underground, likes parrots and his favorite sport is ice hockey. He is also married.

== Equipment ==
=== Sonata Arctica ===
The subject has used Ibanez Jem and Universe models (Steve Vai). He has also used custom ESP guitars and the ESP EV-7 signature model.

- Ibanez UV777
- Ibanez RG550XH
- Carvin DC400
- Ibanez JEM 7DBK
- ESP EV-7

== Discography ==
=== Sonata Arctica ===
- The Days of Grays (2009)
- Live in Finland (2011)
- Stones Grow Her Name (2012)
- Pariah's Child (2014)
- Ecliptica - Revisited: 15th Anniversary Edition (2014)
- The Ninth Hour (2016)
- Talviyö (2019)
- Clear Cold Beyond (2024)

=== Elias Viljanen ===
- Taking the Lead (2002)
- The Leadstar (2005)
- Fire-Hearted (2009)
- Evillusionist (2021)
- Acoustic Intelligence (2022)
- Evil Elements (2025)

=== Blackbay ===
- Arouse (2001)

=== Twilight Lamp ===
- Grandiose (1999)

=== Depravity ===
- Silence of the Centuries (1993)

== Sources ==
- Profile on the Official Sonata Arctica Website
- Official announcement concerning the departure of Jani Liimatainen
