= Jarkko Ahola =

Finnish musician (born 1977)

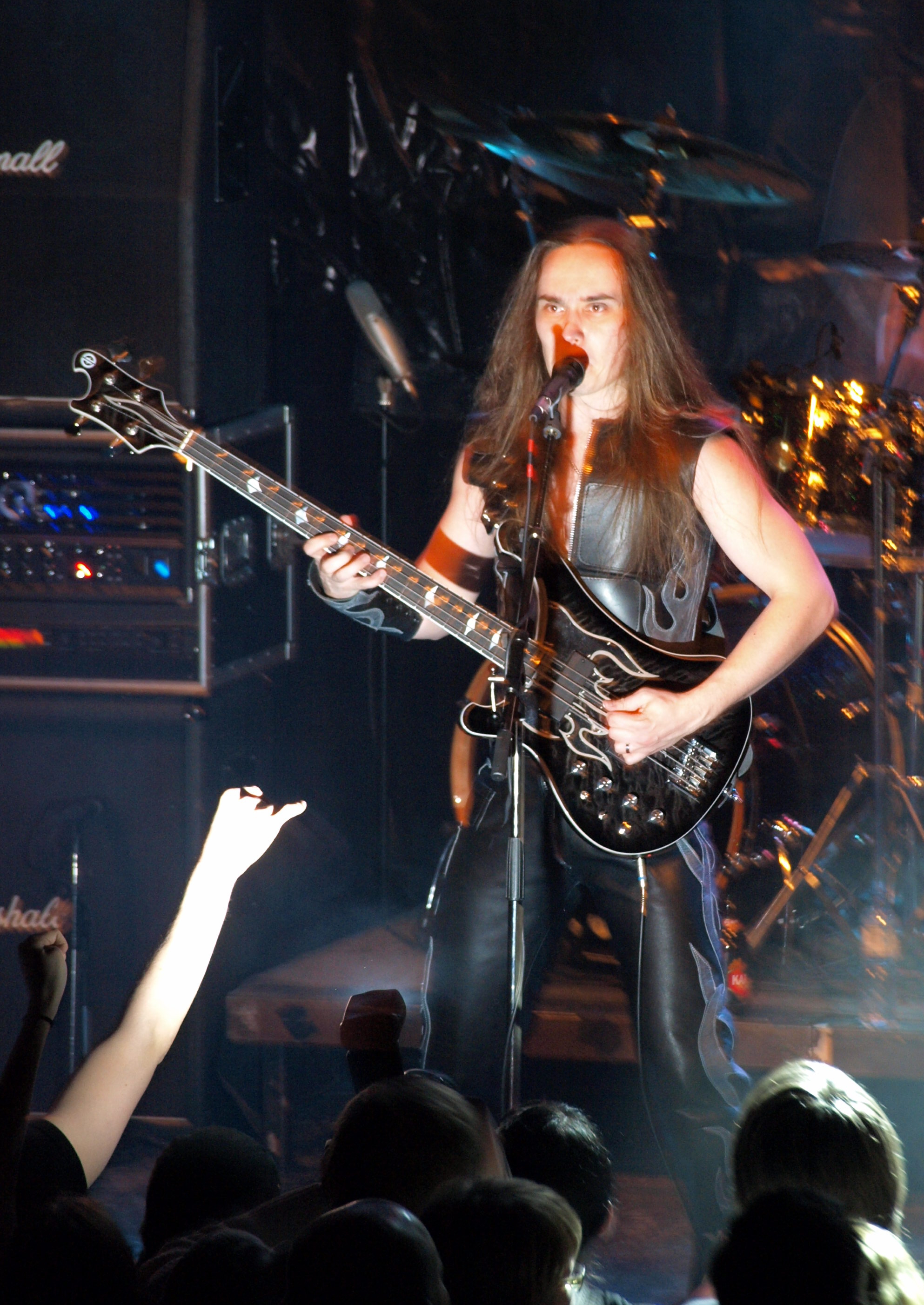
- Ahola in 2008

Background information
- Also known as: J. Ahola
- Born: Jarkko Kalevi Ahola; 24 August 1977 (age 48)
- Origin: Toijala, Finland
- Genres: Heavy metal, power metal, symphonic metal
- Occupations: Musician, songwriter
- Instruments: Vocals, bass, guitar, synthesizer
- Member of: Teräsbetoni, Northern Kings, Ahola, Raskasta Joulua, Forces United
- Formerly of: Dreamtale

Jarkko Kalevi Ahola (born 24 August 1977) is a Finnish performing artist, composer and singer.

== Career ==
Born in Toijala, he is the vocalist and bass player and one of the three songwriters of the band Teräsbetoni. He is also a member of a Finnish symphonic metal cover supergroup Northern Kings together with Marko Hietala from Nightwish, Tarot and Sapattivuosi, Tony Kakko from Sonata Arctica and Juha-Pekka Leppäluoto from Charon and Harmaja.

Other bands Ahola has been involved with are Dreamtale, Cosmic Spell and Helmisetti. In addition, Ahola has taken part in the Raskasta Joulua project incorporating the sound of metal to Christmas carols. He is a lefthanded bass player. In 2013, took part in the project Forces United, where he acted in the role of vocalist. The project also took part Maxim Samosvat, Konstantin Seleznev, Daria Stavrovich.

== Discography ==
=== Albums ===
as part of Ahola

Year	Album	Peak positions
Year	Album	FIN
2012	Stoneface	41
2014	Tug of War	14

Solo (as Jarkko Ahola)

Year	Album	Peak positions	Certification
Year	Album	FIN	Certification
2012	Ave Maria – Joulun klassikot	4	
2014	Suojelusenkeli – Joulun klassikot 2	4	
2016	Romanssi	1	
2018	Mä tuun sun luo	2	
2019	Metallisydän	6	
2023	Joulun rauhaa	7	
