= Verjnuarmu =

Finnish heavy metal band

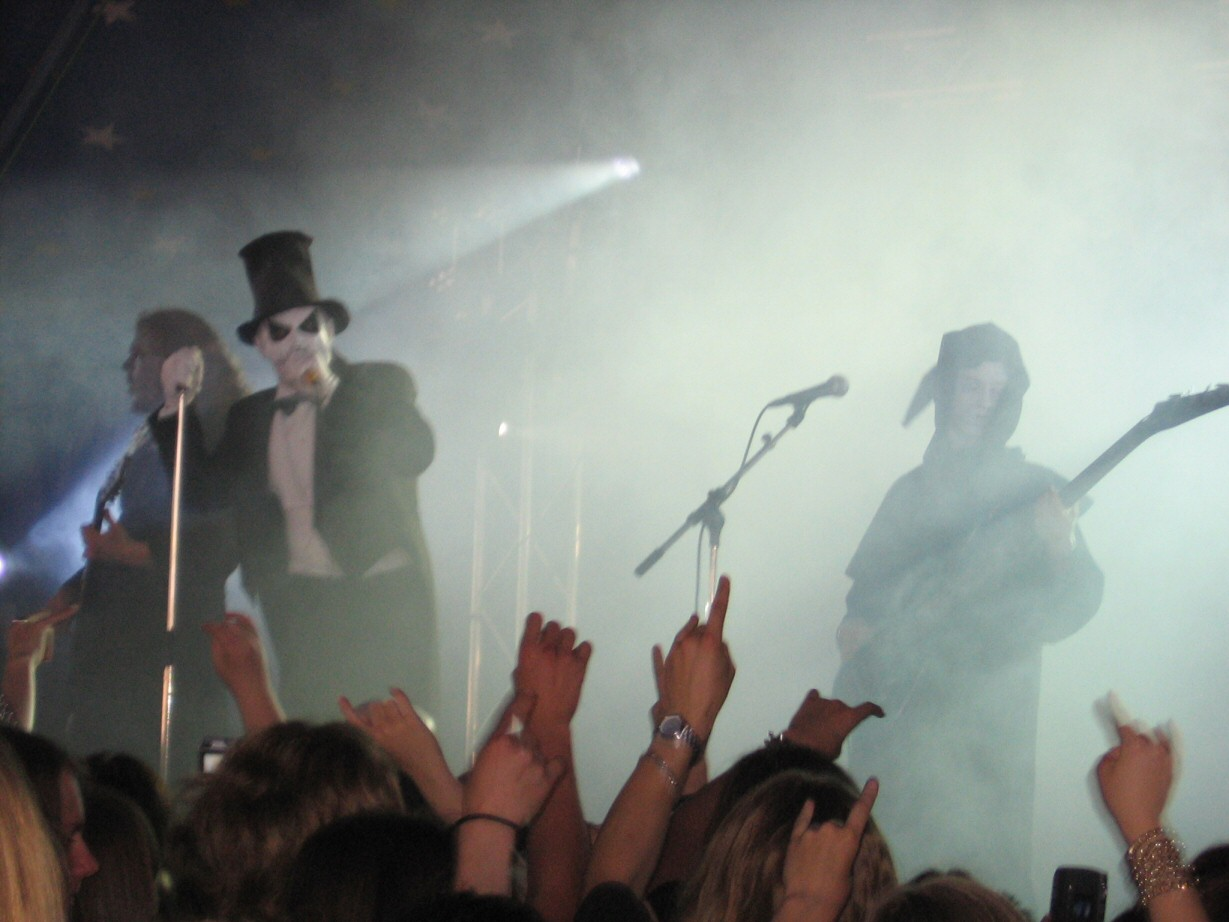
- Verjnuarmu at Tuska music festival 2006.

Background information
- Origin: Kuopio, Finland
- Genres: Death metal, folk metal, doom metal, black metal
- Years active: 2002–2018, 2025–present
- Labels: Universal Music; Dynamic Arts Records; Osasto-A Records
- Members: Puijon Perkele; Tervapiru; Woema; Musta Savo
- Website: verjnuarmu.com

Verjnuarmu was a heavy metal band from Finland singing in the Savo dialect of the Finnish language.

Performing in a dialect is rare in the Finnish heavy metal scene. Sometimes their style is dubbed as "Savo metal". According to Viitakemies, former guitarist of the band, their greatest influences musically are death metal, traditional heavy metal, and traditional folk music.

Their full-length debut album, Muanpiällinen helevetti, was released in 2006 under Universal Music Finland. In 2008, the band signed to the Finnish metal label Dynamic Arts Records and released their second album, Ruatokansan uamunkoetto.

in August 2018 the band announced the death of their drummer, Musta Savo, and announced the band's break-up.

The band's remaining members reunited in 2025, starting with a performance at Hatefeast Metal Festival.

== Members ==
=== Current line-up ===
- Puijon Perkele (Tuomas Koponen) – lead vocals
- Tervapiru (Topi Pitkanen) – guitar
- Woema – bass

=== Former ===
- Musta Savo (Janne Rissanen) – drums and death grunts, 2002–2018 (died 2018)
- Viitakemies (Tarmo Luostarinen) – lead guitar, 2003–2011
- Savon Surma (Petteri Ruotsalainen) – rhythm guitar and death grunts, 2001–2008
- Ruato – rhythm guitar, 2008

== Discography ==
=== Studio albums ===
- Muanpiällinen helevetti (CD, Universal, 2006)
- Ruatokansan uamunkoetto (CD, Dynamic Arts, 2008)
- Lohuton (CD, Osasto-A, 2010)
- Pimmeyvven ruhtinas (CD, Osasto-A 2012)
- 1808 (CD, Independent 2015)

=== Demos ===
- Verjnuarmu (demo, 2002)
- Verta, woemoo ja viitakkeita (demo, 2002)
- Laalavat jouset (demo, 2004)

== Singles ==
- Kurjuuvven valssi (single, 2005)
- Itkuvirsj (single, 2006)
- Kuvajaenen (digital single, 2010)
- Turja (digital single, 2010)
- Lentävä kalakukko (digital single, 2012)
