= Epsilon (Dreamtale album) =

Studio album by Dreamtale
- Released: 20 April 2011
- Genre: Power metal
- Length: 49:24
- Label: Secret Door

Dreamtale chronology
Phoenix (2008)	Epsilon (2011)	World Changed Forever (2013)

Professional ratings
Review scores
Source	Rating
Imperiumi	9/10 stars
Stormbringer	5/5
Time for Metal	9/10

Epsilon is the fifth studio album by Finnish power metal band Dreamtale. It was released on The Secret Door record label on 11 May 2011 in Finland, with an earlier 20 April 2011 release in Japan, and then released via IceWarrior Records on 28 September 2012 in Germany, Austria, and Switzerland, and 8 October 2012 in other European countries. The album reached number 39 on Suomen virallinen lista, The Official Finnish Charts.

== Track listing ==
1. "Firestorm" (4:30)
2. "Angel of Light" (4:04)
3. "Each Time I Die" (5:13)
4. "Where Eternal Jesters Reign" (3:33)
5. "Fly Away" (5:08)
6. "Reasons Revealed" (4:48)
7. "Strangers' Ode" (5:58)
8. "Mortal Games" (3:46)
9. "Lady of a Thousand Lakes" (5:51)
10. "March to Glory" (6:28)

== Personnel ==
- Erkki Seppänen - vocals
- Rami Keränen - guitar
- Akseli Kaasalainen - keyboards
- Seppo Kolehmainen - guitar
- Petteri Rosenbom - drummer
- Heikki Ahonen - bass

== Charts ==
Chart positions for Epsilon
Chart	Peak
Finnish Albums	39
