= Dreamtale =

Finnish metal band

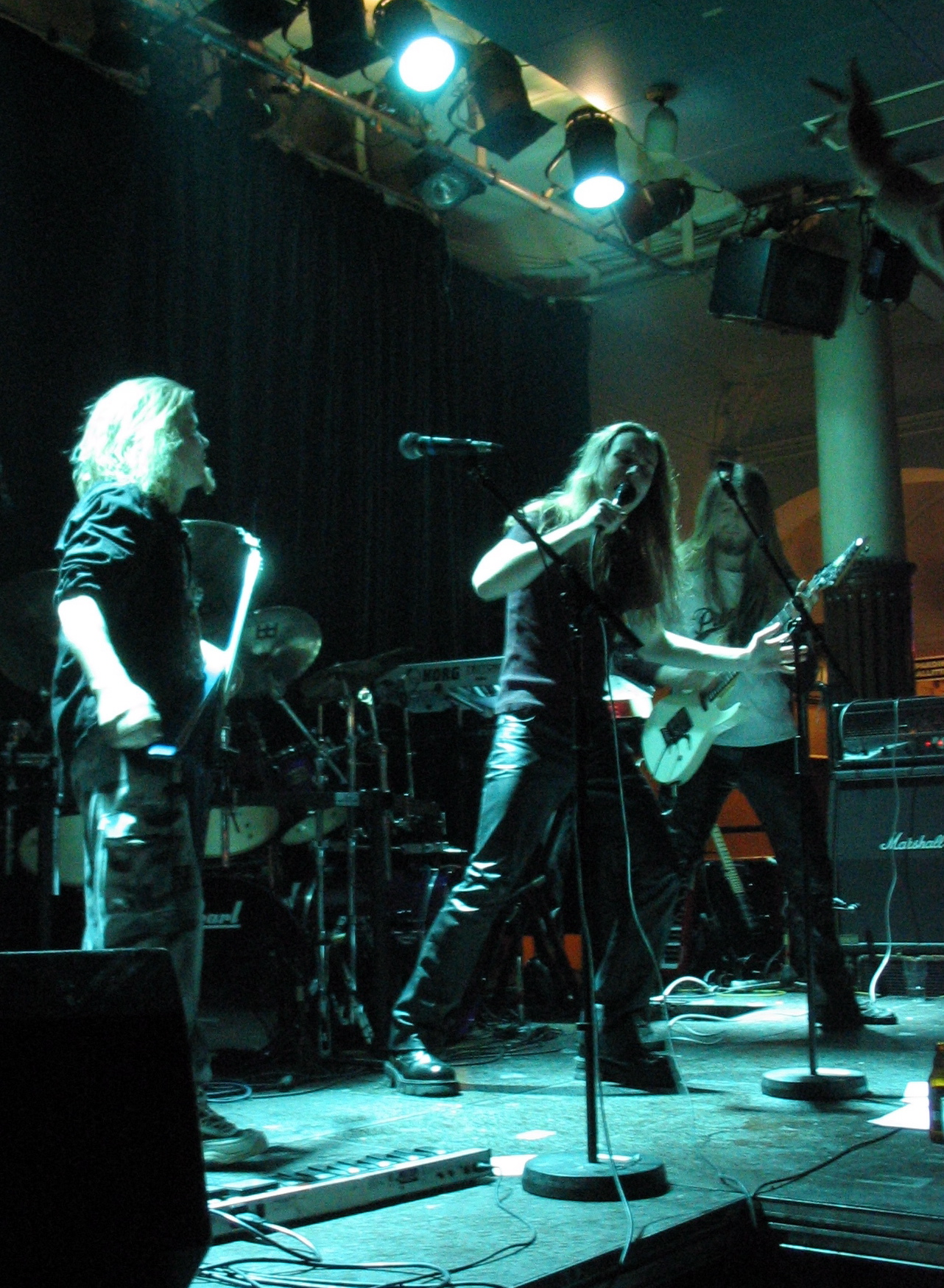
- Dreamtale in 2004. From left to right: Keränen, Ahola, Orjatsalo.

Background information
- Origin: Finland
- Genres: Power metal, symphonic metal
- Years active: 1999–present
- Label: Secret Door
- Members: Nitte Valo; Jarno Vitri; Rami Keränen; Zsolt Szilagyi; Mikko Hepo-Oja; Arto Pitkänen; Akseli Kaasalainen
- Past members: Alois Weimer; Janne Juutinen; Erkki Seppänen; Esa Orjatsalo; Heikki Ahonen; Seppo Kolehmainen; Tomi Viiltola; Turkka Vuorinen; Jarkko Ahola; Nils Nordling; Pasi Ristolainen; Rolf Pilve; Petteri Rosenbom
- Website: dreamtale.org

Dreamtale is a Finnish power/symphonic metal band from Tampere, formed in 1999.

== History ==
The music project was founded by guitarist Rami Keränen in early 1999. Keränen also served as the band's vocalist until 2002. The band first gathered fame by playing as Sinergy's supporting act in Finland, and their second demo, Refuge from Reality, sold out on the day of its release.

Most of the copies of the demo were sold in Japan, which helped the band make itself known to record labels. Dreamtale started receiving recording deal offers from around the world, and in August 2001 signed a deal with Spinefarm Records.

In December 2001, Dreamtale started the recordings of Beyond Reality. After finishing the album, Dreamtale went through changes in their line-up: Pasi Ristolainen replaced bassist Alois Weimer, and a new singer, Tomi Viiltola, joined the group. Keränen is the sole founding member to remain with the band.

Beyond Reality, which was released in Japan in June and elsewhere during July 2002, selling well and gaining positive reception from reviewers and the Finnish press.

Recordings for their second album Ocean's Heart begun in January 2003 at Fantom studios Finland, where the album was then mixed by Samu Oittinen. Finishing touches were added with Mika Jussila's mastering at Finnvox-studios. The album was released later that year, once again selling well and gaining positive reception from reviewers and the Finnish press.

A single "Wellon" was released, originally intended for their 2005 album Difference but not making the final cut.

Keyboardist Turkka Vuorinen left the band in 2006 and was replaced by Akseli Kaasalainen. In late 2008, bassist Pasi Ristolainen left the band, mainly because of a lack of motivation. Dreamtale has since replaced him with Heikki Ahonen.

In 2010, they released samples of songs called Angel Of Light, Reasons Revealed and Strangers' Ode. The 5th album called Epsilon was released in 2011 through the band's own label Secret Door Records. This album saw the return of original drummer, Petteri Rosenbom. The album has received positive feedback. It reached number 39 on Suomen virallinen lista, The Official Finnish Charts.

It was announced on 14 January 2013 that their sixth studio album was being recorded. Timo Tolkki mixed the album in February and the track list was revealed that same month. The album, World Changed Forever, was released on 26 April 2013. The album has received mixed-to-positive feedback.

On 9 December 2016, Dreamtale released their seventh studio album, entitled Seventhian... Memories of Time. Alongside the 12 new songs that comprise the first disc, re-recordings of several tracks from the band's earlier albums were also released.

On 1 April 2022, Dreamtale released their eighth studio album, entitled Everlasting Flame, their first album in over five years. After several pre-release singles, their ninth album Aetherbound was released on 31 July 2026.

== Members ==
=== Current members ===
- Rami Keränen – guitars (1999–present), vocals (1999–2002), keyboards (1999–2000)
- Akseli Kaasalainen – keyboards (2006–present)
- Arto Pitkänen – drums (2007–2010, 2017–present)
- Nitte Valo – vocals (2019–present)
- Jarno Vitri - vocals (2019-present)
- Mikko Hepo-Oja – bass (2019–present)
- Zsolt Szilagyi – guitars (2019–present)

=== Former members ===
- Kalle-Pekka Alare – guitar (1999)
- Petri Laitinen – bass (1999–2000)
- Kimmo Arramies – bass (2000)
- Mikko Viheriälä – keyboards (2000)
- Turkka Vuorinen – keyboards (2000–2006)
- Alois Weimer – bass (2000–2002)
- Tomi Viiltola – vocals (2002–2003)
- Esa Orjatsalo – guitar (1999–2004)
- Jarkko Ahola – vocals (2003–2005)
- Rolf Pilve – drums (2005–2007)
- Nils Nordling – vocals (2005–2007)
- Pasi Ristolainen – bass (2002–2008)
- Mikko Mattila – guitar (2004–2007)
- Petteri Rosenbom – drums (1999–2005, 2010–2014)
- Erkki Seppänen – vocals (2007–2019)
- Seppo Kolehmainen – guitar (2007–2019)
- Heikki Ahonen – bass (2009–2019)
- Janne Juutinen – drums (2014–2017)

== Discography ==
=== Studio albums ===
Title	Release date	Peak chart positions
Title	Release date	FIN
Beyond Reality	2 December 2002	—
Ocean's Heart	15 September 2003	—
Difference	25 April 2005	—
Phoenix	4 June 2008	—
Epsilon	20 April 2011	39
World Changed Forever	26 April 2013	41
Seventhian... Memories of Time	9 December 2016	—
Everlasting Flame	1 April 2022	27
Aetherbound	31 July 2026	43

=== Singles ===
Title	Year	Peak chart positions	Album
Title	Year	FIN	Album
"Wellon"	2005	9	
"Payback"	2008	—	Phoenix
"Take What the Heavens Create"	2008	—	Phoenix
"Angel of Light"	2009	—	Epsilon
"Tides of War"	2013	—	World Changed Forever
"Join the Rain"	2013	—	World Changed Forever
"October Is Mine"	2016	—	Seventhian... Memories of Time
"Sleeping Beauty"	2019	—	Everlasting Flame
"The Glory"	2022	—	Everlasting Flame
"Battleheart"	2024	—	Aetherbound
"Mirror Mirror"	2026	—	Aetherbound
"The Wave of Time"	2026	—	Aetherbound

=== Demos ===
- Shadow of the Frozen Sun (1999)
- Refuge from Reality (2000)
