= Tarot (band) =

Finnish heavy metal band

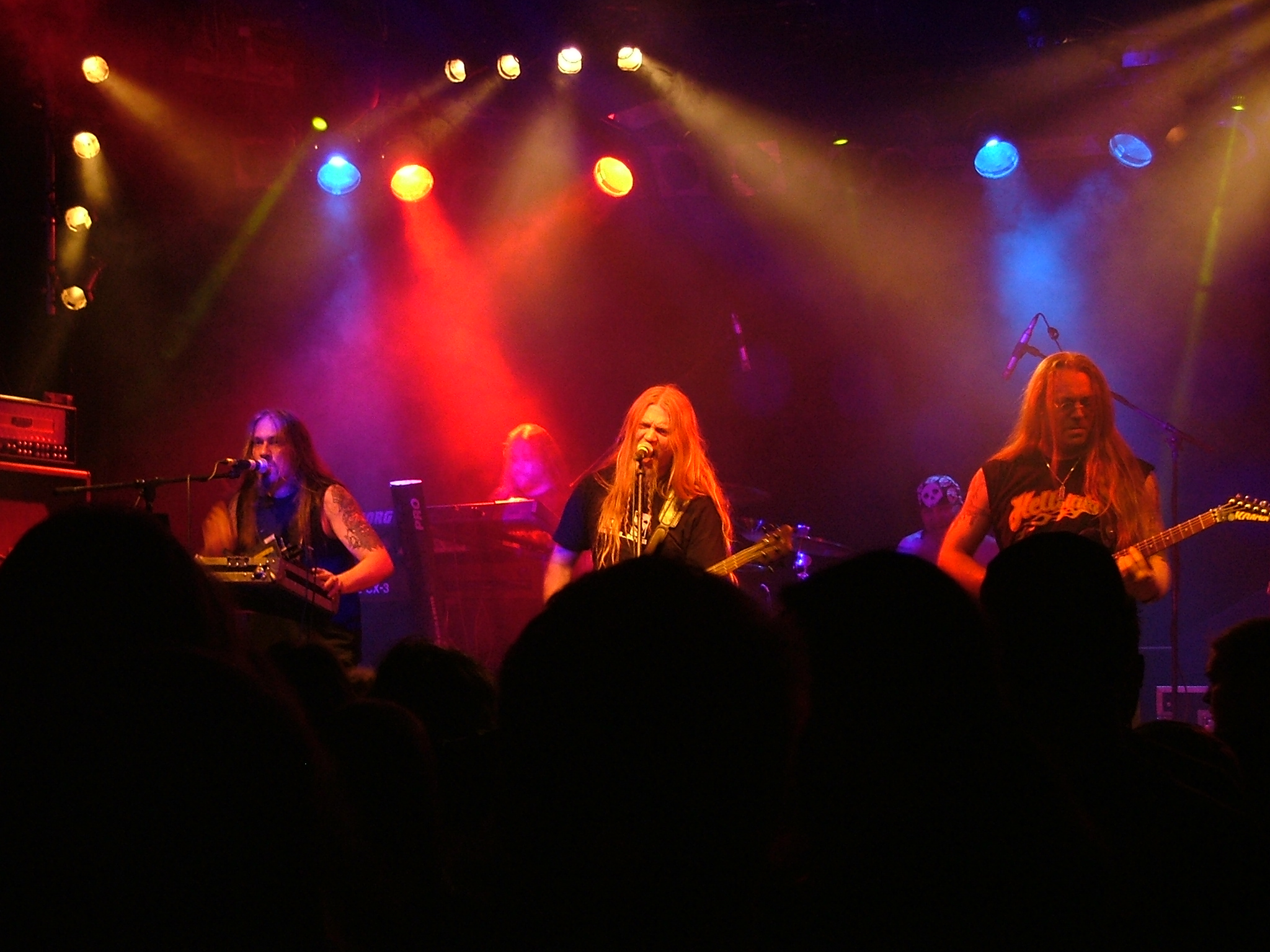
- Tarot performing in Germany in 2007

Background information
- Also known as: Purgatory (1982–1984)
- Origin: Kuopio, Finland
- Genre: Heavy metal
- Years active: 1982–2016; 2023–present
- Labels: King Foo, Spinefarm
- Members: Marko Hietala; Zachary Hietala; Janne Tolsa; Tommi Salmela; Antero Seppänen
- Past members: Mako H Pecu Cinnari
- Website: wingsofdarkness.net

Tarot is a Finnish heavy metal band. They are most famous for being one of the earliest metal bands in Finland, and for the song "Wings of Darkness" from the 1986 album Spell of Iron. While having enjoyed a broad underground popularity in Finland, the band did not become notable elsewhere until gaining new success after 2002, when singer and bassist Marko Hietala joined the largely successful Nightwish, where he played for over two decades. With a more global audience, the band re-recorded Spell of Iron for its 25th anniversary in 2011.

== History ==
Tarot was originally formed by the Hietala brothers in the early 1980s. Back then the band was called "Purgatory". As Purgatory reached the point when they got the record deal, they changed their name to "Tarot" at the insistence of the label Flamingo Records. The line-up settled into the form of Marko Hietala (bass/vocals), Zachary Hietala (guitars), Mako H (guitars) and Pecu Cinnari (drums).

The "Wings of Darkness" single saw the daylight in April 1986 and in December that same year Tarot released their first full-length album Spell of Iron. In April 1988, following the release of a single "Rose on the Grave", their second album Follow Me into Madness was released.

After the second album, there was a hiatus in the band. During this "vacation" the line-up changed a little bit and a keyboardist was added to the band as Janne Tolsa joined Tarot and replaced the second guitarist Mako H. After long preparation, the third album To Live Forever came out in February 1993. Tarot received good publicity in Japan, making their first live album To Live Again to be released as a Japanese special edition in November 1994. The live album was recorded at Tavastia Club, Helsinki in August 1994. Some of the songs from the live album were released the following year on a limited edition bonus CD with the next studio album, Stigmata. To Live Forever was remixed and re-released in 2006 together with all the previous albums.

Much anticipated For the Glory of Nothing came out in 1998. Shining Black, a Tarot compilation album, came out in Japan in December 1998. While Tarot was inactive, Marko also played in the bands Conquest and Sinergy. Together with other members of Conquest, Marko played cover songs under the name Metal Gods. Marko became a member of Nightwish in 2001. Tolsa played the keyboards for Virtuocity's Secret Visions album as Marko sang a few songs on it. In summer 2002 Tarot played a special '80s gig in Kuopio, playing material only from the first two albums.

In March 2003, the compilation Shining Black was released again in the rest of the world. Tarot signed a new record deal with Spinefarm Records and the new studio album Suffer Our Pleasures was released. While the album did well in Finland, it was barely noticed elsewhere.

During these years Marko was busy with his other band Nightwish by recording and touring around the world. Tolsa worked on an album with Eternal Tears of Sorrow and toured with the industrial metal band Turmion Kätilöt.

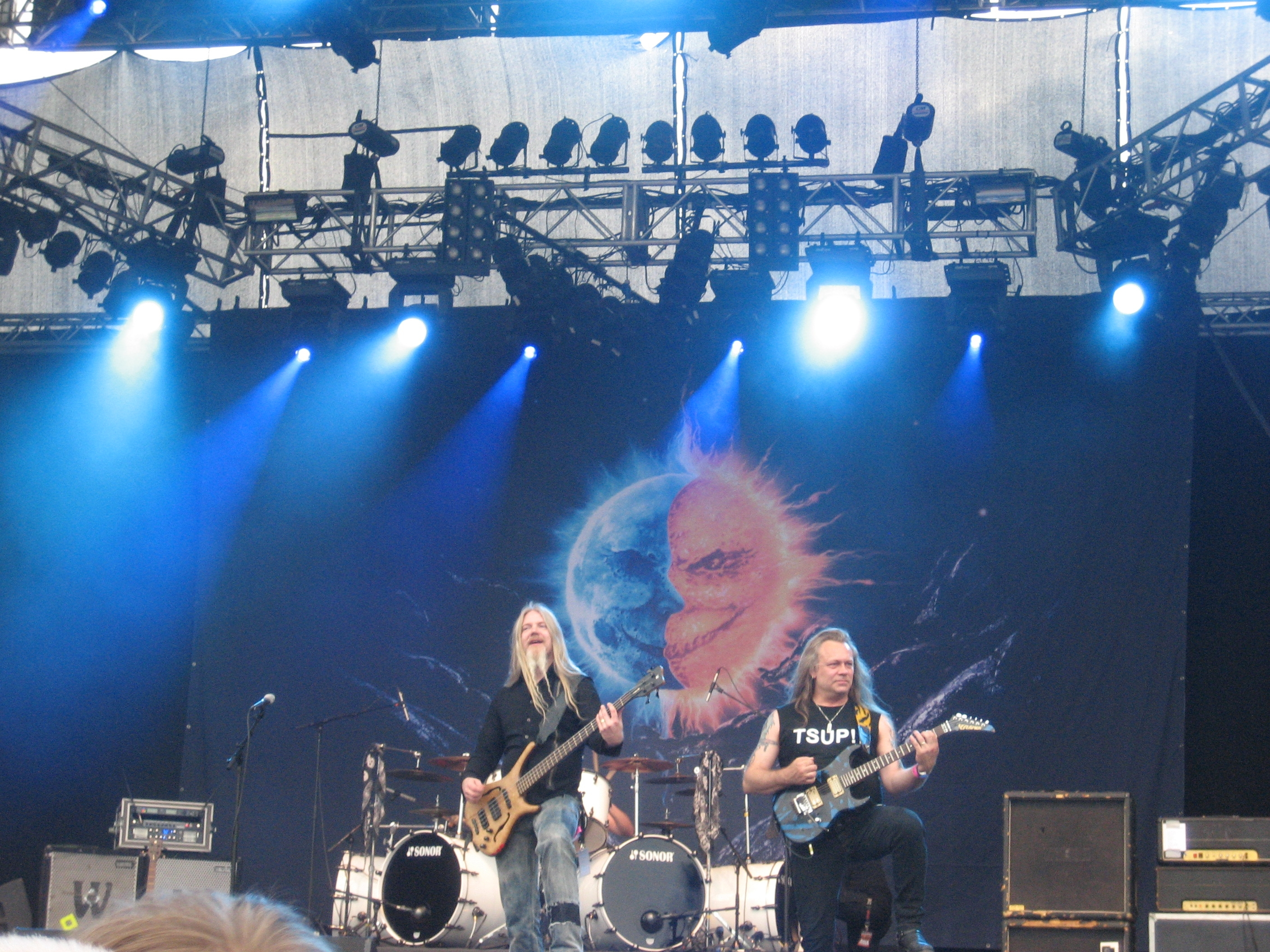
Tarot performing in 2010

Early 2006, Tarot's earlier label Bluelight Records released a collection of the band's first six albums remastered with a large amount of bonus material, unreleased demos, live and special versions of the songs and some covers. Some of the albums were also remixed.

The fans had been expecting the re-releases for years and the collection was so successful that in May 2006, when Tarot released the new single "You", it made number one on the Finnish charts for the first time in the history of the band. During that time, the band formalized their long-time roadie/backing vocalist Tommi Salmela as a band member after being with the band for more than a decade.

Early 2006, Tarot was signed to KingFoo Entertainment in Finland, with Nuclear Blast covering the rest of Europe. During summer of 2006, the band not only toured various clubs and festivals but also composed, demoed and recorded new material. The album Crows Fly Black was released in October 2006.

On 11 June 2008, Tarot released their first live DVD, Undead Indeed. The DVD also had a live album counterpart. They followed the release with a short tour in support of Undead Indeed, which began 30 January 2009.

Their new album, entitled Gravity of Light, was released in Finland on 10 March 2010, in Europe on 23 April 2010, the UK on 26 April 2010, and in North America on 8 June 2010.

On 11 September 2016, it was announced on Facebook that drummer Pecu Cinnari had died due to a long-term illness. Since then, the band was on hiatus, during which Marko departed from Nightwish, though he stated in an interview that new material from Tarot is still "up in the air".

The band reunited for a one-off show on 26 July in Kuopio, Finland, with Turmion Kätilöt drummer Antero Seppänen filling in Cinnari. They performed at Tuska Festival in June 2024.

== Band members ==
Current

- Marko Hietala – lead vocals, bass, acoustic guitar (1982–2016, 2023–present)
- Zachary Hietala – guitars (1982–2016, 2023–present)
- Janne Tolsa – keyboards (1988–2016, 2023–present)
- Tommi Salmela – sampler, vocals (2006–2016, 2023–present)
- Antero Seppänen – drums (2023–present)

Former

- Marko Happonen – guitars (1982–1988)
- Pecu Cinnari – drums (1982–2016; died 2016)

Timeline

== Discography ==
=== Albums ===
==== Studio ====
- Spell of Iron (1986)
- Follow Me into Madness (1988)
- To Live Forever (1993)
- Stigmata (1995)
- For the Glory of Nothing (1998)
- Suffer Our Pleasures (2003)
- Crows Fly Black (2006)
- Gravity of Light (2010)
- The Spell of Iron MMXI (2011)

==== Live ====
- To Live Again (Live CD, 1994)
- Undead Indeed (Live 2CD, 2008)

=== Singles and EPs ===
- Wings of Darkness (1986)
- Love's Not Made for My Kind (1986)
- Rose on the Grave (1988)
- Angels of Pain (1995)
- As One (1995)
- Warhead (1997)
- The Punishment (1998)
- Undead Son (2003)
- You (2006)
- I Walk Forever (2010)

=== Compilations ===
- Shining Black – The Best of Tarot (2003)
- Metallic Emotions (2007)

=== DVDs ===
- Undead Indeed (2008)

=== Music videos ===
- Wings of Darkness (1986)
- Love's Not Made for My Kind (1986)
- I Don't Care Anymore (1988)
- The Punishment (1998)
- Pyre of Gods (2003)
- Ashes to the Stars (2006)
- I Walk Forever (2010)
- Wings of Darkness (2011)
