= Janne Tolsa =

Finnish heavy metal musician (born 1970)

RunQ
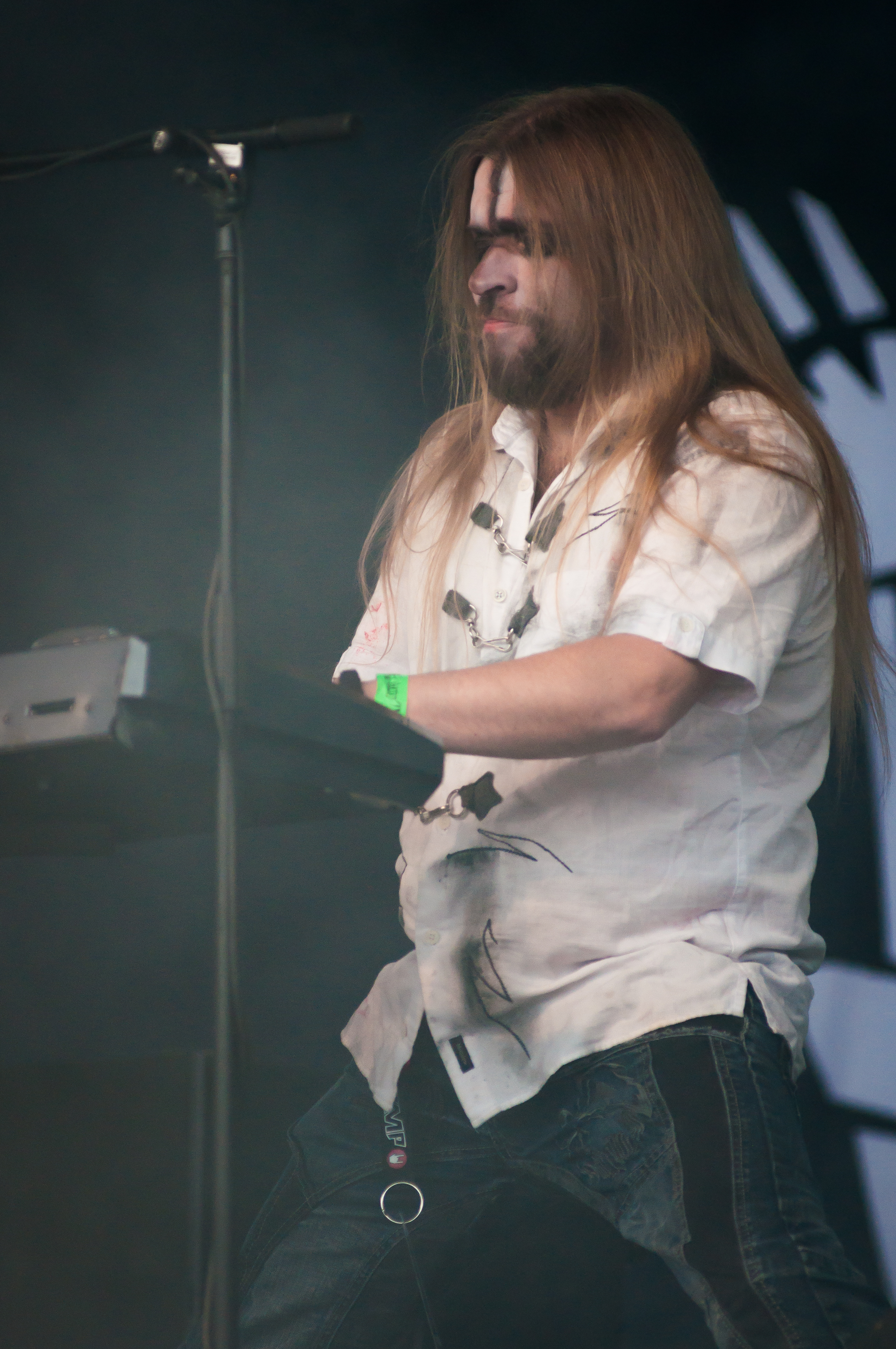
- RunQ in 2013

Background information
- Born: Janne Tolsa; 7 March 1970 (age 56); Finland
- Occupation: Musician
- Instrument: Keyboard, guitar
- Years active: 1988–present

Janne Tolsa (born 7 March 1970) is a Finnish heavy metal musician. Known for his keyboard work in Tarot from the late 1980s, Tolsa also took part in the melodic death metal band Eternal Tears of Sorrow, which he joined in 2005 until their disbandment in 2025, as well as the industrial metal band Turmion Kätilöt (under the alias RunQ). Tolsa is also known to work as a composer for television. Janne Tolsa plays keyboards in Marenne Band and is one of the composers in the band's debut album The Past Prelude.

His main keyboards are a Komplete Kontrol Mk2, Korg Sp-200 (studio), Arturia Kelylab MkII, (Live with macbook pro), KORG CX-3 (studio), he also uses Korg and Ensoniq keyboards (Studio)

In addition, he is the owner of the Kuopio-based studio, Note on Studio, where Turmion Kätilöt, Tarot and Eternal Tears of Sorrow have partly or completely recorded many of their albums.

== Biography ==
Janne Tolsa began to play the piano in 1977, when he was seven years old. After studying music for three years in Helsinki, his family moved to Vuolijoki, where he continued to study piano through private lessons. His first band experience was with his older brother in 1983.

A few years later, during the Follow Me into Madness Tour, Tarot played a few shows near Tolsa's hometown. At the time, they were playing as a trio, having recently fired Mako H. from the band. Tolsa attended every show and continuously found his way backstage after shows to convince the members of the band (Marko Hietala, Zachary Hietala, and Pecu Cinnari) that he could play keys for them. He was often drunk and the band turned him away, not believing him.

Eventually, Tarot played a show with a keyboard backstage, which Tolsa used to play Rose on the Grave (Follow Me into Madness). Impressed, the band exchanged phone numbers with Tolsa, and invited him to one of their rehearsals. On 26 June 1988, he played his first show as a member of Tarot in Kalajoki. He then joined Tarot for the writing and recording of their third studio album, To Live Forever, which was released in 1993. In addition to playing the keys for Tarot, Tolsa frequently writes and co-writes music for Tarot albums.

In 2003, Tolsa joined Turmion Kätilöt as part of the band's original lineup under the alias "RunQ."

In 2004, Tolsa was invited to join the reformation of Eternal Tears of Sorrow, a melodic death metal band from Finland that had disbanded in 2003. He accepted, and performed with the band until its second disbandment in 2025.

In 2007, Tolsa joined the Marenne band with Zachary Hietala as part of the band's original lineup. He also helped to mixed their debut album, The Past Prelude.

As part of his "day job," Tolsa is the owner of Note on studio in Kuopio, Finland. That composing, records and produce commercial music, sound effects, background music. Also has been used by Tolsa's bands (among many others) to record parts of their albums.

Janne Tolsa also has mixed, mastered and produced countless other bands.

In 2017 Janne Tolsa made a solo project, Epik Pike. Epik Pike paints a brand new atmosphere for domestic pop-scene.

Janne Tolsa, known as one of the composers and the man behind the synthesizers on bands like Turmion Kätilöt and Tarot, has now released a bunch of pop songs from his drawer. Lyrics for Tolsa's songs were written by his good friend and songwriter Pekka Tegelman, known from the 70's popular band Finnforest. The whole project came together as two interpreters from Kuopio were found: young and talented Pinja Pitkänen and guitar hero Joonas Pulkkinen from the band Black Light Discipline.

In 2025, Tolsa collaborated with Indian gospel and R&B singer Arunaja on a joint single, Tempest, alongside fellow Tarot musician Marko Hietala.

== Discography ==
=== Tarot ===
- To Live Forever (1993)
- To Live Again (1994)
- Stigmata (1995)
- For the Glory of Nothing (1998)
- Shining Black Best of (2003)
- Suffer Our Pleasures (2003)
- Crows Fly Black (2006)
- Undead Indeed Live DVD/CD (2008)
- Gravity of Light (2010)
- The Spell of Iron MMXI (2011)

=== Eternal Tears of Sorrow ===
- Before the Bleeding Sun (2006)
- Children of the Dark Waters (2009)
- Saivon Lapsi (2013)

=== Marenne ===
- The Past Prelude (2009)

=== Turmion Kätilöt ===
- Niuva 20 (EP) (2005)
- U.S.C.H! (2008)
- Perstechnique (2011)
- Technodiktator (2013)
- Kiitos 2004-2014 Live DVD (2014)
- Diskovibrator (2015)
- Dance Panique (2017)
- Universal Satan (2018)
- Vihreät Niityt (Single) (2019)
- Global Warning (2020)
- Hengitä (Single) (2021)
- Omen X (2023)
- Reset (2024)

=== Lazy Bonez ===
- Vol.1 (2013)
- Alive (2015)
- Kiss of the night (2019)
- Eye of the Sky (2023)

=== Virtuocity ===
- Secret Visions (2002)

=== Verjnuarmu ===
- Muanpiällinen helevetti (2006)

=== Jalven Veljet ===
- Aamut Joella (2007)

=== Epik Pike ===
- The Big Picture (EP) (2018)
- Tomorrow Wonderland (Single) (2020)
- Vibes of Secret (Single) (2023)
- Dangerous (Single) (2024)

=== Botsbwana ===
- ACHTUNG! (Single) (2023)
- Logi (Single) (2024)
- Det Här Är Natten (Single) (2024)

=== Janne Tolsa & Arunaja ===
- Tempest (Single) (2025)ö

=== Tolsa & Kuosmanen ===
- End Of Undivine (Single) (2026)
