= Resodance =

Studio album by Turmion Kätilöt
- Released: 23 October 2026
- Genres: Industrial metal, industrial rock
- Length: 43:30
- Label: Nuclear Blast

Turmion Kätilöt chronology
Reset (2024)	Resodance (2026)

Singles from Resodance
- 1. "Raivotarjonta" Released: 30 July 2026; 2. "Lunastakaa" Released: 27 August 2026; 3. "Amon-Ra" Released: 24 September 2026; 4. "Näe minut" Released: 23 October 2026

Resodance is the twelfth studio album by Finnish industrial metal band Turmion Kätilöt and was released on 23 October 2026, on the label Nuclear Blast. Some songs from the album have been released as singles, each of which have also been filmed in music videos, including "Raivotarjonta", "Lunastakaa" and "Amon-Ra".

The album is noted to have "more melodic songs than screams", although the band has stated that the album "still contains the recognizable Turmion Kätilöt, but also includes new nuances, a headiness, deeper themes and in places a punk-spirited touch." The band has embarked on a tour through Finland to promote the album that started on the day after the album's release and will conclude in April 2027, the first concert having taken place at the Helsinki Ice Hall, supported by Skynd and Business City.

== Track listing ==
Resodance track listing
No.	Title	Length
1.	"Nostajat" (Lifters)	3:20
2.	"Kunnioita" (Respect)	3:42
3.	"Pöytäviinaa Ja Pimeitä Naisia" (Table Spirits and Shady Women)	3:17
4.	"Amon-Ra"	3:40
5.	"Hallelujah!"	3:32
6.	"Näe minut" (See Me)	5:12
7.	"Lunastakaa" (Redeem)	3:28
8.	"Karma"	3:18
9.	"Levolle Laske" (Lay Down to Rest)	2:45
10.	"Teloitus" (Execution)	3:29
11.	"Raivotarjonta" (Rage Supply)	3:14
12.	"In Our Dreams (To Be Continued 1)"	4:33

== Personnel ==
- MC Raaka Pee – vocals
- Shag-U – vocals
- Bobby Undertaker – guitars
- Master Bates – bass
- RunQ – keyboards
- DQ – drums
