= To/Die/For =

Finnish gothic metal band

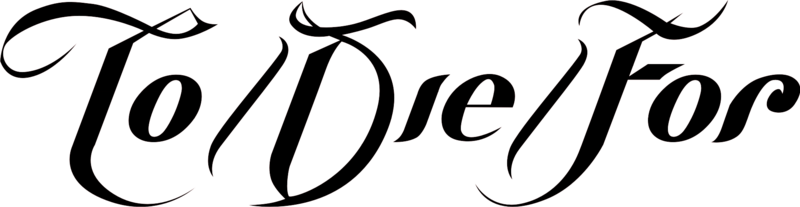

Background information
- Also known as: Mary-Ann (1993–1999)
- Origin: Finland
- Genre: Gothic metal
- Years active: 1993–2016, 2020–present
- Label: Spinefarm Records
- Members: Sanna Solanterä; Juppe Sutela; Joonas Koto; Kalle Kukkonen; Miikka Kuisma
- Past members: Tonmi Lillman; Marko Kangaskolkka; Mika Ahtiainen; Josey Strandman; Santtu Lonka; Juha Kylmänen; Jussi-Mikko Salminen; Antti-Matti Talala; Eza Viren; Samuel Schildt; Matti Huopainen; Jape Perätalo
- Website: todiefor.fi

To/Die/For (often abbreviated TDF) are a gothic metal band from the town of Kouvola in southeast of Finland, originally assembled in 1993 as a hard rock band under the name Mary-Ann. In 1999, they decided to change their musical style to gothic metal, changing their band name as well. The band disbanded in April 2009, but reformed in July 2009, and played their final concert at John Smith Rock Festival in Finland on 22 June 2016. They reformed once again in early 2020.

== History ==
=== Mary-Ann (1993–1999) ===
To/Die/For was formed under the name Mary-Ann in 1993. They released two demo EPs, "Mary-Ann" in 1997 and "Deeper Sin" in 1998, before changing name as they modified musical style from heavy metal to gothic metal in 1999. "Deeper Sin" thereby resulted in a record deal with Spinefarm Records.

=== All Eternity and Epilogue (1999–2002) ===
Their debut album – All Eternity – was released in Finland by the end of 1999, and the band then signed contracts with Nuclear Blast (for Europe) and Pony Canyon (for Japan). Their cover of the Sandra song "In the Heat of the Night" was to be the only single, and together with "Farewell" it was recorded as a music video, and obtained a fair amount of exposure.

In 2000, the band toured Europe together with Dark Tranquillity, Sentenced and In Flames. Bassist Miikka Kuisma quit the band and was replaced by Marko Kangaskolkka, who had played with the band in its early years. "Epilogue", the successor of "All Eternity", was released in 2001, and was followed by a tour with Lacrimosa.

=== Jaded, IV and Wounds Wide Open (2003–2009) ===
The album Jaded was released in 2003, and is by many fans still seen as the band's best effort. In August of that year, vocalist Jarno Perätalo left the band. He assembled a new band named Tiaga, integrated by former members of To/Die/For. Juha Kylmänen (from For My Pain and Reflexion) then assumed the vocals of To/Die/For. However, in 2004, Jarno Perätalo and the band Tiaga took the name To/Die/For themselves, releasing the fourth album, simply titled IV, in 2005.

On 4 October 2006, To/Die/For released their fifth studio album, Wounds Wide Open. After the promotional tour that stretched to October 2007, the band decided to take a break.

=== Samsara, Cult, deaths, split-up and reformation (2009–2016, 2019–present) ===
To/Die/For released their sixth album Samsara in 2011, and after spending the following years touring, released their seventh studio album Cult in May 2015. The first single from their album, "Screaming Birds", was released in November 2014. To/Die/For disbanded in July 2016.

Two of the band's former drummers died; Tommi Lillman died on 13 February 2012 after an illness, and Santtu Lonka died on 26 January 2020 with no cause of death revealed.

In January 2020, the band announced they would be reuniting to play at the John Smith Festival at Laukaa in July 2020.

In November 2024, Jape Perätalo and the band announced that Jape would leave the band. The split happened without much drama. The band announced at the same time that they were looking for a new singer and that they would continue making music. In February 2025, the band announced that Sanna Solanterä would be their new singer. They say that this is going to be the start of a new era for them.

== Line-up ==
Line-up in the "Mary-Ann" era is not included.

=== Current members ===
- Juppe Sutela – rhythm guitar (1999–2005, 2010–2016, 2020–present)
- Joonas Koto – lead guitar, keyboards (1999–2002, 2005–2009, 2020–present)
- Miikka Kuisma – bass (1999–2000, 2020–present)
- Kalle Kukkonen – drums (2022–present)
- Sanna Solanterä – vocals (2025–present)

=== Former members ===
- Jape Perätalo – vocals, keyboards (1999–2016, 2020–2025)
- Tonmi Lillman – drums, keyboards (1999–2003, 2009–2010; died 2012)
- Marko Kangaskolkka – bass (2001–2004)
- Mika Ahtiainen – lead guitar (2002–2005)
- Josey Strandman – bass (2004–2011)
- Santtu Lonka – drums (2003–2008, 2010–2011; died 2020)
- Antti-Matti "Antza" Talala – lead guitar (2005–2014)
- Jussi-Mikko Salminen – keyboards (2004–2005, 2010–2014)
- Toni Paananen – drums (2008–2009)
- Samuel Schildt – bass (2014–2015)
- Eza Viren – bass (2011–2014), lead guitar, keyboards (2014–2016)
- Matti Huopainen – drums (2011–2016, 2020–2022)

=== Guest musicians ===
- Alexi Laiho – guitar solo on In the Heat of the Night
- Kimberly Goss – vocals in All Eternity
- Marko Hietala – vocals in Epilogue
- Tanya Kemppainen – vocals in Epilogue and Jaded
- Anna Lukkarinen – vocals in Jaded
- Jonna Imelainen – vocals in Jaded

== Discography ==
=== Studio albums ===
- All Eternity (1999)
- Epilogue (2001)
- Jaded (2003)
- IV (2005)
- Wounds Wide Open (2006)
- Samsara (2011)
- Cult (2015)

=== Compilations ===
- Epilogue from the Past (2010)

=== Singles ===
- In the Heat of the Night (2000)
- Hollow Heart (2001)
- Little Deaths (2005)
- Like Never Before (2006)
- Screaming Birds (2014)
