= Ram-Zet =

Norwegian avant-garde metal band

- Origin: Hamar, Hedmark, Norway
- Genres: Avant-garde metal, progressive metal
- Years active: 2015–present 1998–2013
- Labels: Spikefarm, Century Media, Tabu, Ascendance Records
- Members: Zet; Sfinx; Küth; Lanius; KA
- Past members: Solem; Jon Daniel; Magnus Østvang; Sareeta
- Website: Official page Official Myspace

Ram-Zet is a progressive metal band formed in Hamar, Norway in 1998.

== Genre classification ==
Ram-Zet's music ranges from black metal to thrash metal. It has industrial sounds, progressive structures, and traditional instruments. Singer Zet described their style as "schizo-metal". Their music features rare time signatures, unconventional harmonies, and unusual violin parts. They can be regarded as avant-garde metal because of their wide range of influences.

Ram-Zet's lyrics deal with schizophrenia theme. The albums Pure Therapy, Escape, and Intra revolve around that mental disorder. The three albums feature an overarching story with two main characters: a schizophrenic patient (sung by Zet), and a nurse (sung by Sfinx).

== History ==
=== Foundation and debut record: 1998–2000 ===
Ram-Zet began in 1998 as singer and guitarist Zet (Henning Ramseth)'s one-man project. It later evolved into a full band with of Küth (drums) and Solem (bass), leading to the release of debut album Pure Therapy in September 2000.

=== Four more studio albums and continued touring: 2000–2013 ===
On 17 March 2007, Sfinx stated in the band's official forum that Ram-Zet was working on new material and would perform live presently. Later that month, the official news section of the Ram-Zet website confirmed that statement. The news stated that the band had been rehearsing six songs and working on many more. Rumor had it that the album would come out in late 2007, but was put on hold when Zet went on tour with Ride the Sky as guest keyboardist/guitarist. According to the band's official MySpace, recording the new album began on 1 March 2008. It was also stated that the album would be heavier and slower than previous albums, but would retain some faster moments.

In October 2008, the band took 10 songs and rearranged them for an acoustic concert in Hamar. Approximately 200 people attended the event. The concert was filmed and was expected to be released on DVD in February/March 2010.

=== Hiatus: 2013–2015 ===
In 2013, after five studio albums and 14 years, Ram-Zet went on indefinite hiatus, before some leading members departed. Guitarist Zet joined melodic death metal band Vardøger. That year, Sfinx joined Viper Solfa as a female vocalist.

=== Recent years: 2015–present ===
The band ended its hiatus in late 2015. The band started to record new material and planned to tour.

On 26 March 2026, the band released their sixth album, Sapien.

== Personnel ==
=== Current members ===
- Zet - vocals, guitar (previously of Ride the Sky)
- SfinX - vocals (previously of For My Pain and Eternal Tears of Sorrow)
- Küth - drums, percussion (previously of The Kovenant)
- Lanius - bass, didgeridoo (joined during the post Intra period)
- Aazuu/Fjernkontrollet - keyboards (previously of Trollfest) 2023-present

=== Former members ===
- Solem - bass (on Pure Therapy and Escape) 2000-2003
- Daniel - bass (on Intra) 2003-2006
- Magnus - keyboards (Return) (left after Intra) 2001-2008
- Sareeta - violin, backing vocals (Ásmegin, Solefald) 2001-2009
- KA - keyboards (joined during Neutralized) 2008/9-2023

== Related bands ==
- Zet went on tour with Ride the Sky replacing Kaspar Dahlqvist on keyboard and rhythm guitar in 2007.
- Küth is the current session drummer for black metal/industrial metal band The Kovenant, where he replaced Jan Axel Blomberg (Hellhammer/Von Blomberg) just after the release of the 4th album SETI in 2003.
- Sareeta was also the violinist for folk metal band Ásmegin.
- Sareeta played violin for black progressive metal band In Lingua Mortua and for avant-garde metal band Solefald on their albums Red for Fire and Black for Death.
- Sfinx made some guest vocals for Fallen the album of the Finnish superband For My Pain and for the melodic death metal band Eternal Tears of Sorrow on their albums Before the Bleeding Sun, Children of the Dark Waters, and Saivon Lapsi.
- SfinX is working on an album with her own compositions and arrangements. This band is called EndLing and will be released sometime during 2013.

== Discography ==
Studio albums

- Pure Therapy (2000)
- Escape (2002)
- Intra (2005)
- Neutralized (2009)
- Freaks in Wonderland (2012)
- Sapien (2026)
