= Children of the Dark Waters =

Studio album by Eternal Tears of Sorrow
- Released: May 2009
- Recorded: 2008
- Studio: Tico-Tico Studios, Note On Studios, Finnvox Studios, Finland; Space Valley Studios, Norway
- Genre: Melodic death metal, symphonic metal, gothic metal
- Label: Suomen Musiikki (Finland) Massacre (rest of Europe) Marquee/Avalon (Asia)

Eternal Tears of Sorrow chronology
| Before the Bleeding Sun (2006) | Children of the Dark Waters (2009) | Saivon Lapsi (2013) |

Singles from Children of the Dark Waters
- 1. "Tears of Autumn Rain" Released: 18 February 2009

Children of the Dark Waters is the sixth studio album by Finnish melodic death metal band Eternal Tears of Sorrow. It was released in May 2009 through Suomen Musiikki for Finland, Massacre Records for the rest of Europe and Marquee/Avalon Records for Asia. It is the second album to feature Jarmo Kylmänen on clean vocals, but his first album as an official member.

The album's first single was "Tears of Autumn Rain" released in Finland on 18 February and featured vocals by Miriam Renvåg (Ram-Zet) and Heidi Parviainen (Amberian Dawn). The B-side of the single is a reworked version of "Vilda Mánnu" from the self-titled album Vilda Mánnu. The album was mixed at Finnvox Studios (Helsinki) and recorded at Tico-Tico Studios in Kemi. Lead guitarist Risto Ruuth left the band right before the release of the album and was replaced by Mika Lammassaari (from Mors Subita). "Angelheart, Ravenheart (Act II: Children of the Dark Waters)" is the second part of "Angelheart, Ravenheart (Act I: Before the Bleeding Sun)" from Before the Bleeding Sun. On the UK Amazon edition, "Vilda Mánnu" is replaced by "Sea of Whispers (Acoustic Reprise)" as a bonus track.

== Track listing ==
| No. | Title | Lyrics | Music | Length |
|---|---|---|---|---|
| 1. | "Angelheart, Ravenheart (Act II: Children of the Dark Waters)" | Veteläinen & Kylmänen | Kylmänen & Ruuth | 6:00 |
| 2. | "Baptized by the Blood of Angels" | Veteläinen | Ruuth | 4:21 |
| 3. | "Tears of Autumn Rain" | Puolakanaho & Veteläinen | Kylmänen | 4:18 |
| 4. | "Summon the Wild" | Puolakanaho & Veteläinen & Kylmänen | Puolakanaho | 4:28 |
| 5. | "Sea of Whispers" | Veteläinen & Kylmänen | Kylmänen | 4:14 |
| 6. | "Midnight Bird" | Veteläinen & Puolakanaho | Puolakanaho | 4:47 |
| 7. | "Diary of Demonic Dreams" | Veteläinen & Kylmänen | Kylmänen & Puolakanaho | 4:25 |
| 8. | "When the Darkest Night Falls" | Puolakanaho | Puolakanaho | 2:32 |
| 9. | "Nocturne Thule" | Puolakanaho & Kylmänen & Veteläinen | Puolakanaho & Ruuth & Kylmänen | 5:16 |
| 10. | "Sea of Whispers (Acoustic Reprise)" (bonus track in the European digipak version) | Veteläinen & Kylmänen | Kylmänen | 4:12 |
| 11. | "Vilda Mánnu" (bonus track in Japan) | Törrö & Veteläinen & Puolakanaho | Törrö & Veteläinen & Puolakanaho | 5:24 |
| 12. | "Sea of Whispers" (karaoke version; bonus track in Japan) | Veteläinen & Kylmänen | Kylmänen | 4:13 |

== Charts ==
| Chart (2009) | Peak position |
|---|---|
| Finnish Albums Chart | 19 |

== Personnel ==
- Altti Veteläinen – lead vocals, bass guitar
- Jarmo Kylmänen – clean vocals/backing vocals
- Janne Tolsa – keyboards
- Jarmo Puolakanaho – rhythm guitar
- Risto Ruuth – lead guitar
- Juho Raappana – drums
- Petri Sankala – drums (on tracks 2, 3, 6 and 11) [1]*

[1]* Petri left the band after the first recording session.

=== Guest musicians ===
- Miriam Elisabeth Renvåg – vocals (Ram-Zet)
- Heidi Parviainen – vocals (Amberian Dawn)

== Release history ==
| Region | Date | Label |
|---|---|---|
| Finland | 27 May 2009 | Suomen Musiikki |
| Rest of Europe | 22 May 2009 | Massacre Records |
| Asia | 24 June | Marquee/Avalon |
