= Reset (Turmion Kätilöt album) =

Studio album by Turmion Kätilöt
- Released: 25 October 2024
- Genres: Industrial metal, industrial rock
- Length: 45:56
- Label: Nuclear Blast

Turmion Kätilöt chronology
| Omen X (2023) | Reset (2024) | Resodance (2026) |

Singles from Reset
- 1. "Schlachter" Released: 28 June 2024; 2. "Yksi Jumalista" Released: 21 August 2024; 3. "Pulssi" Released: 2 October 2024; 4. "Sinä 2.0" Released: 25 October 2024

Reset is the eleventh studio album by Finnish industrial metal band Turmion Kätilöt and was released on 25 October 2024, on the label Nuclear Blast. The songs "Schlachter" (German remix of "Teurastaja" from the band's 2004 debut Hoitovirhe), "Yksi Jumalista", "Pulssi", and "Sinä 2.0" have been released as singles from the album, each of which have also been filmed in music videos.

The album is promoted by a book written about the band's career, En tahdo unohtaa koskaan by Elina Järvi, and touring that started on the day of the album's release and includes a concert at the Painohalli in Hämeenlinna on 14 December 2024.

== Track listing ==
Reset track listing
| No. | Title | Length |
|---|---|---|
| 1. | "Yksi Jumalista" (One of the Gods) | 3:19 |
| 2. | "Päästä Irti" (Let Go) | 3:06 |
| 3. | "Pulssi" (Pulse) | 3:39 |
| 4. | "Sinä 2.0" (You 2.0) | 3:09 |
| 5. | "Musta Piste" (Black Dot) | 3:40 |
| 6. | "Trauma" | 3:05 |
| 7. | "Otava" (Big Dipper) | 3:50 |
| 8. | "Se Mitä Et Näe" (That Which You Don't See) | 3:57 |
| 9. | "Kerran Kuollut" (Once Dead) | 3:29 |
| 10. | "Puuttuva Naula" (The Missing Nail) | 3:03 |
| 11. | "Schlachter" (Butcher) | 3:49 |
| 12. | "Reset 7 (Not to Be Continued)" | 7:50 |

== Personnel ==
=== Turmion Kätilöt ===
- MC Raaka Pee – vocals
- Shag-U – vocals
- Bobby Undertaker – guitars
- Master Bates – bass
- RunQ – keyboards
- DQ – drums

=== Guests ===
- Kasperi Heikkinen (Beast in Black) – guitar solo on track 3
- Netta Turunen (daughter of MC Raaka Pee) – guest vocals on track 4
- Chris Harms (Lord of the Lost) – guest vocals on track 11

== Charts ==
Chart performance for Reset
| Chart (2024) | Peak position |
|---|---|
| Finnish Albums (Suomen virallinen lista) | 3 |
