= Saivon Lapsi =

Studio album by Eternal Tears of Sorrow
- Released: 22 February 2013
- Recorded: 2012
- Genre: Symphonic metal, melodic death metal, power metal
- Length: 45:10
- Label: Suomen Musiikki (Finland); Massacre (rest of Europe); Marquee/Avalon (Asia)

Eternal Tears of Sorrow chronology
Children of the Dark Waters (2009)	Saivon Lapsi (2013)

Saivon Lapsi is the seventh and final studio album released by the Finnish melodic death metal band Eternal Tears of Sorrow. The album's single "Dark Alliance" was released on 8 February 2013, two weeks before the album's release on 22 February.

== Track listing ==
No.	Title	Lyrics	Music	Length
1.	"Saivo"	Instrumental	Lammassaari & Tolsa	1:11
2.	"Dark Alliance"	Puolakanaho & Veteläinen	Lammassaari	4:17
3.	"Legion of Beast"	Veteläinen	Lammassaari	4:06
4.	"Kuura"	Instrumental	Lammassaari	1:01
5.	"Dance of December"	Veteläinen	Lammassaari	4:40
6.	"The Day"	Kylmänen & Veteläinen	Lammassaari	4:15
7.	"Sound of Silence"	Kylmänen & Veteläinen	Kylmänen	4:12
8.	"Beneath the Frozen Leaves"	Puolakanaho	Kylmänen & Puolakanaho	5:30
9.	"Swan Saivo"	Kylmänen, Puolakanaho & Veteläinen	Kylmänen & Lammassaari	4:22
10.	"Blood Stained Sea"	Kylmänen & Veteläinen	Lammassaari	4:06
11.	"Angelheart, Ravenheart (Act III: Saivon Lapsi)"	Kylmänen & Veteläinen	Lammassaari	7:30

== Personnel ==
=== Band members ===
- Altti Veteläinen − vocals, bass guitar
- Jarmo Kylmänen − clean vocals
- Mika Lammassaari − lead guitar, backing vocals
- Jarmo Puolakanaho − rhythm guitar
- Janne Tolsa − keyboards
- Juho Raappana − drums

=== Guest ===
- Miriam Elisabeth Renvåg − female vocals
