= Tuohimaa =

Tuohimaa is a surname. Notable people with the surname include:

- Frans Tuohimaa (born 1991), Finnish ice hockey player
- Harri Tuohimaa (born 1959), Finnish ice hockey player
- Jani Tuohimaa, Finnish rapper
- Katariina Tuohimaa (born 1988), Finnish tennis player
- Lauri Tuohimaa (born 1979), Finnish musician
