= Neutralization =

Neutralization or Neutralized may refer to:

- Neutralization (chemistry), a chemical reaction where a base and an acid react to form a salt
- Neutralisation (immunology), pathogen neutralization caused by antibodies
- Neutralisation (sociology)
- Neutralization (linguistics), the elimination of certain distinctive features of phonemes in certain environments
- Insertion of a network in an amplifier to eliminate parasitic oscillation (electronics)
- Neutralized (album), a 2009 album by Ram-Zet
