= Valtteri Laurell Pöyhönen =

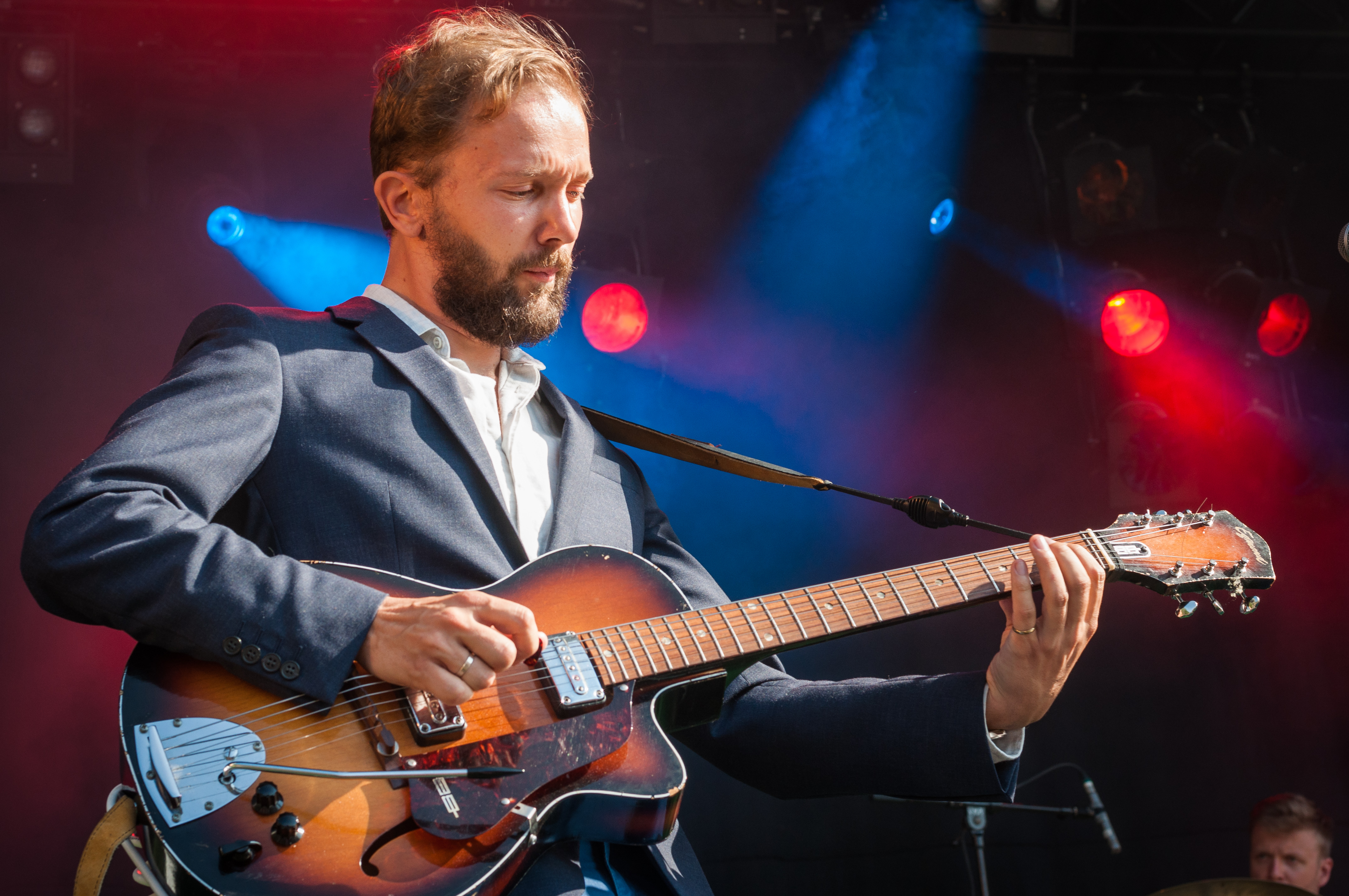
- Valtteri Laurell Pöyhönen, 2013

Background information
- Born: September 23, 1978 (age 48); Helsinki, Finland
- Genres: Jazz, hip hop, acid jazz
- Occupations: Musician, composer, bandleader, producer
- Instruments: Piano, guitar, synthesizer
- Years active: 1990s–present
- Labels: Ricky-Tick Records, Sony Music Finland, BBE Records, Suomen Musiikki
- Website: valtteripoyhonen.com

Valtteri Laurell Pöyhönen (born September 23, 1978, in Helsinki, Finland) is a Finnish jazz guitarist, pianist, composer, bandleader and producer. He is best known as bandleader and composer of the 20-headed Ricky-Tick Big Band and the award-winning jazz-sextet Dalindèo.

== Biography ==
Valtteri Laurell Pöyhönen grew up in Helsinki, Finland. In 2010 Pöyhönen finished his master studies in jazz composition from the jazz department of the Sibelius Academy in Helsinki. He has also studied at the Conservatoire de Paris, the Codarts and Helsinki's Pop and Jazz Conservatory. Since 2009, Pöyhönen has divided his time between Berlin and Helsinki.

== Groups ==
=== Dalindèo ===
In 2003, Pöyhönen founded the jazz-sextet Dalindèo. The group's line-up consists of Valtteri Laurell Pöyhönen (guitar, bandleader), Jose Mäenpää (trumpet), Petri "Pope" Puolitaival (saxophone and flute), Rasmus Pailos (percussion), Pekka Lehti (double-bass, from summer 2004 on) and Jaska Lukkarinen (drums). Dalindèo's early music was a fusion between Brazilian jazz, hard bop and exotica. From 2013 onwards, heavy surf guitars and rockabilly-sounds have been prominent in the group's sound. The group's fourth studio album Kallio became a huge success, and received the prestigious Emma-award as "Jazz Album of the Year" in 2013.

=== Ricky-Tick Big Band ===
In 2009, after studying composition for a year in Paris, Pöyhönen founded the Ricky-Tick Big Band. The 16-member big band took its name from the Helsinki-based record label Ricky-Tick Records, and the original line-up included many of the label's artists, including saxophonist Timo Lassy and trumpetist Jukka Eskola. The group released their self-titled debut album Ricky-Tick Big Band in 2010.

=== Ricky-Tick Big Band & Julkinen Sana ===
In 2012, Pöyhönen met with rapper Paleface and drummer Jaska Lukkarinen to contemplate a collaboration of big band jazz and rap. This resulted in the forming of the 20-piece Ricky-Tick Big Band & Julkinen Sana, with rappers Paleface, Tommy Lindgren and Redrama. The group's debut album Burnaa was released in 2013 and was a critical success, debuting at number four on the Finnish national album chart and staying in the Top 10 for 11 weeks. Consequently, the group toured all over Finland in jazz and rock festivals. The group's second album Korottaa Panoksii was released in October 2015, again followed by extensive touring all over Finland.

=== Other works ===
In 2014 premiered Pöyhönen's suite A Nocturnal Affair (Yön Rakastaja) for big band and tenor sax soloist, which was commissioned by the UMO Jazz Orchestra, featuring Timo Lassy on tenor saxophone.

Pöyhönen has also written several string and horn arrangements for rap artist Paleface, including "Palamaan" from the movie soundtrack to Pahan Kukat and the tracks "Snaijjaa", "Vangin Laulu", and on the album Maan Tapa.

== Awards ==
- 2013: Emma-award for the jazz album of the year, Dalindèo: Kallio

== Discography ==
With Dalindèo:

- Poseidon / Solifer-Lento 12” (Ricky-Tick Records, 2004)
- Go Ahead, Float / Voodoo 12” (Ricky-Tick Records, 2005)
- Open Scenes (Ricky-Tick Records, Suomen Musiikki, 2006)
- Vintage Voyage EP (Ricky-Tick Records, 2008)
- New Creation / Another Devil 7” (Ricky-Tick Records, 2009)
- Soundtrack for the Sound Eye (Ricky-Tick Records, 2010)
- Kallio (Suomen Musiikki, BBE Records, 2013)
- Slavic Souls (Suomen Musiikki, BBE Records, 2016)

With Ricky-Tick Big Band & Julkinen Sana:

- Burnaa (Rokka, Sony Music, 2013)
- Korottaa Panoksii (Rokka, Sony Music, 2015)

With Ricky-Tick Big Band:

- Ricky-Tick Big Band (Ricky-Tick Records, 2010)
