= Before the Bleeding Sun =

Studio album by Eternal Tears of Sorrow
- Released: 21 April 2006
- Recorded: May 2005 – January 2006
- Genres: Melodic death metal, symphonic metal
- Length: 43:08
- Label: Spinefarm

Eternal Tears of Sorrow chronology
A Virgin and a Whore (2001)	Before the Bleeding Sun (2006)	Children of the Dark Waters (2009)

Before the Bleeding Sun is the fifth studio album released by the Finnish melodic death metal band Eternal Tears of Sorrow. The album counts guest performances from Marco Hietala (Tarot and Nightwish), Jarmo Kylmänen (who joined the band in 2008), Sfinx (Ram-Zet) and Tony Kakko (Sonata Arctica).

== Production ==
The recording was started in 2005, after the band came back together and reforged their line-up. It is the band's first album recorded in two different studios (excluding some random recordings on previous albums). Keyboards were recorded by member Janne Tolsa, at his Note On Studios – the rest of the instruments were recorded at Tico-Tico Studios.

It is also the band's third album to include material from two recording sessions. Sinner's Serenade was recorded in July 1996 but also included material from their Bard's Burial demo tape (recorded in October 1994). A Virgin and a Whore was recorded in May 2001 but one of its songs ("Last One for Life") was recorded in December 2000. Before the Bleeding Sun was recorded in two sessions, in spring 2005 and in December 2005-January 2006.

== Track listing ==
No.	Title	Lyrics	Music	Length
1.	"Sweet Lilith of My Dreams"	Puolakanaho & Veteläinen	Puolakanaho & Ruuth & Tolsa	4:51
2.	"Another Me"	Veteläinen	Kylmänen	3:51
3.	"Red Dawn Rising"	Veteläinen & Puolakanaho	Puolakanaho	5:06
4.	"Upon the Moors"	Puolakanaho	Puolakanaho	4:48
5.	"Sakura No Rei"	Puolakanaho & Veteläinen	Kylmänen	2:12
6.	"Sinister Rain"	Puolakanaho	Puolakanaho	5:41
7.	"Lost Rune of Thunder"	Veteläinen	Ruuth	4:03
8.	"Tar Still Flows"	Veteläinen & Sankala	Veteläinen & Puolakanaho	3:55
9.	"Angelheart, Ravenheart (Act I: Before the Bleeding Sun)"	Veteläinen	Puolakanaho & Kylmänen	8:40

== Personnel ==
Band members

- Altti Veteläinen − vocals, bass guitar
- Risto Ruuth − lead guitar, backing vocals (track 1)
- Jarmo Puolakanaho − guitars, backing vocals (track 1)
- Janne Tolsa − keyboards
- Petri Sankala − drums

Guest vocals

- Jarmo Kylmänen − clean vocals (on tracks 3, 5, 6 and 9)
- Miriam Elisabeth "Sfinx" Renvåg − female vocals (on tracks 3, 5, 6 and 9)
- Marco Hietala − backing vocals (on tracks 3, 5, 6 and 9)
- Tony Kakko − backing vocals (on tracks 3 and 9)

== Charts ==
Chart (2006)	Peak position
Finnish Albums Chart	26
