= Turmion Kätilöt =

Finnish industrial metal band

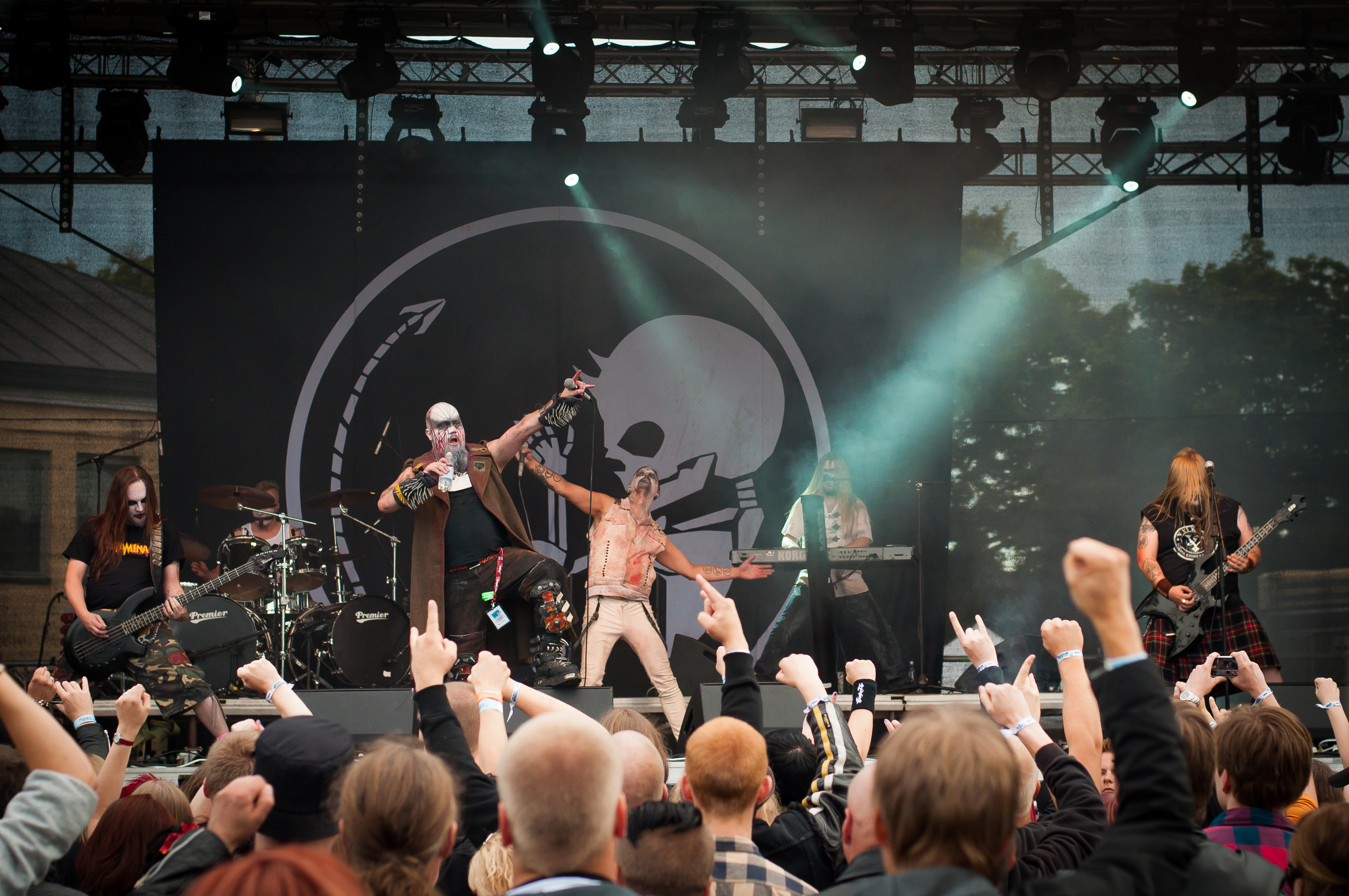
- Turmion Kätilöt in 2013

Background information
- Origin: Kuopio, Finland
- Genres: Industrial metal, cyber metal
- Years active: 2003–2012; 2013–present
- Labels: Spinefarm; Osasto-A; Nuclear Blast
- Members: MC Raaka Pee; RunQ; Bobby Undertaker; DQ; Master Bates; Shag-U
- Past members: DJ Vastapallo; Spellgoth
- Website: turmionkatilot.com

Turmion Kätilöt (literally "Midwives of Ruin", "Midwives of Bane" or "Midwives of Perdition") is a Finnish industrial metal band founded in 2003 by MC Raaka Pee and DJ Vastapallo, who until the latter's departure, were the only studio lineup. The line-up now includes Master Bates, RunQ, DQ, Bobby Undertaker and Shag-U, alongside MC Raaka Pee.

== History ==
The band had a recording contract with Spinefarm Records (specifically Ranka Recordings), and their second album, Pirun nyrkki, was released on 29 March 2006. Shortly after a dispute over income developed between the band and Spinefarm, with the band filing a lawsuit against the label. During the ongoing case, a new album, U.S.C.H.!, was released for free download on 11 June 2008. A single, "Minä määrään" ("I Rule"), was also released for free before the album, on 21 May.

On 9 March, the group posted a statement on their website, clarifying the arguments between the band and their former record company Spinefarm Records had been settled, but stated that the terms of the agreement meant they could not discuss the matter further. U.S.C.H.! was released physically on 20 May 2009 including two bonus tracks.

On 7 December 2012, lead vocalist Turunen suffered a stroke. The band was on small hiatus but returned on 22 January 2013 and revealed that a new album was coming out later that year. On 4 April 2013, the band released a new single titled "Jalopiina" in two different forms; as a purchasable single or as a free download on their website. During the first day after the release, the Finnish record shop Levykauppa X held a campaign where the single was legally stealable.

In May 2015, the band debuted two new singles, "Vastanaineet" and "Taisteluhuuto", and in July announced that their upcoming album Diskovibrator would be available on 25 September that year.

In January 2017, Turmion Kätilöt announced on their Facebook page that long-time member Spellgoth had departed from the band. A devout theistic Satanist, he later commented on his decision to leave the band as "having his heart more on the side of black metal". He currently fronts the Finnish black metal band Horna.

In August 2017, the band announced that after his trial period, Shag-U (also known as Fear of Domination vocalist Saku Solin) would become the full-time member of the band.

== Band members ==
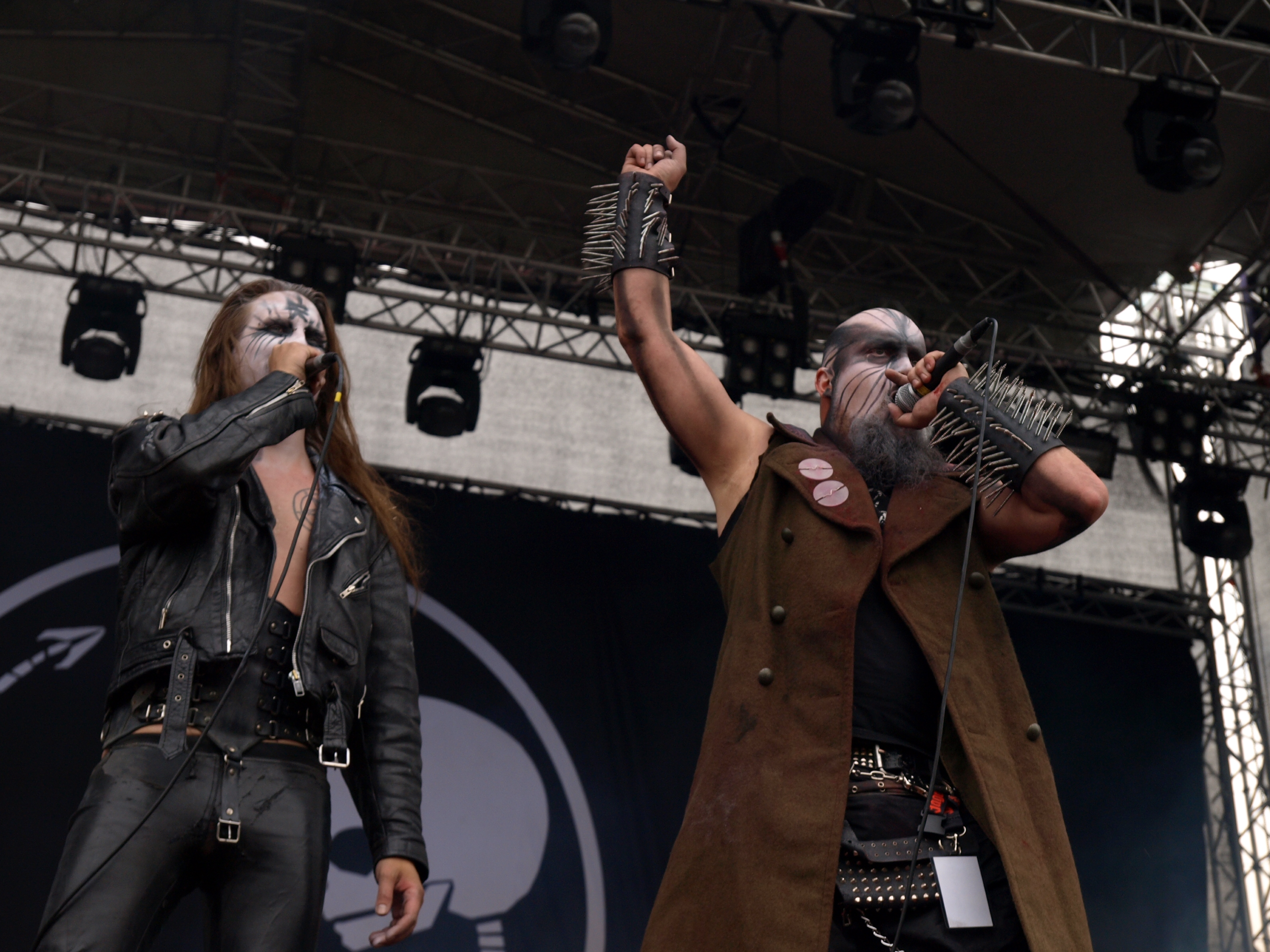
Spellgoth and MC Raaka Pee in 2012

=== Current ===
- MC Raaka Pee (Petja Turunen) – lead vocals
- Master Bates (Hannu Voutilainen) – bass, backing vocals
- Bobby Undertaker (Miikka Närhi) – guitars, backing vocals
- RunQ (Janne Tolsa) – keyboards, synthesizers, programming, backing vocals
- DQ (Antero Seppänen) – drums, percussion
- Shag-U (Saku Solin) – co-lead vocals

=== Former ===
- DJ Vastapallo (Lassi Kauppinen) – guitars
- Spellgoth (Tuomas Rytkönen) – vocals (formerly live only)

=== Session ===
- Plastinen – vocals (session member)

== Discography ==
=== Albums ===
- Hoitovirhe (2004)
- Pirun nyrkki (2006)
- U.S.C.H! (2008)
- Perstechnique (2011)
- Technodiktator (2013)
- Diskovibrator (2015)
- Dance Panique (2017)
- Universal Satan (2018)
- Global Warning (2020)
- Omen X (2023)
- Reset (2024)
- Resodance (2026)

=== Compilations ===
- Mitä Näitä Nyt Oli (2012)

=== EPs ===
- Niuva 20 (2005)

=== Singles ===
- "Teurastaja" (2003)
- "Verta ja lihaa" (2005)
- "Pirun nyrkki" (2006)
- "Minä määrään" (2008)
- "Ihmisixsixsix" (2010, digital release)
- "Jalopiina" (2013)
- "Pyhä maa" (2013, digital release)
- "Vastanaineet" (2015)
- "Hyvissä höyryissä" (2015)
- "Pimeyden morsian 2016" (2016)
- "Surutulitus" (2016)
- "Itämaan tietäjä" (2016)
- "Dance Panique" (2017)
- "Hyvää yötä" (2017)
- "Sikiö" (2018)
- "Faster Than God" (2018)
- "Vihreät niityt" (2019)
- "Sano kun riittää" (2020)
- "Kyntövuohi" (2020)
- "Hengitä" (2021)
- "Isä meidän" (2022)
- "Sormenjälki" (2022)
- "Kuolettavia Vammoja" (2022)
- "Totuus" (2023)
- "Schlachter" (2024)
- "Yksi jumalista" (2024)
- "Raivotarjonta" (2026)
- "Lunastakaa" (2026)
- "Amon-Ra" (2026)
