= Pure Therapy =

2000 album by Ram-Zet

Studio album by Ram-Zet
- Released: October 20, 2000
- Studio: Space Valley Studios
- Genre: Progressive black metal
- Length: 50:22
- Labels: Spinefarm Records; Century Media Records
- Producer: Zet

Ram-Zet chronology
Pure Therapy (2000)	Escape (2002)

Professional ratings
Review scores
Source	Rating
AllMusic	2.5/5 stars

Pure Therapy is the debut album by avant-garde metal band Ram-Zet released on April 30, 2000 under the Finnish record label Spikefarm Records. The band produced the album by themselves.

Pure Therapy starts the schizophrenia theme, continued in the following two releases Escape (2002) and Intra (2005), with a unique story about this mental disorder in two main characters.

== Track listing ==
1. "The Fall" – 4:37
2. "King" – 5:59
3. "For The Sake Of Mankind" – 5:59
4. "Eternal Voice/Peace?" – 8:50
5. "No Peace" – 7:38
6. "Kill My Thoughts" – 5:08
7. "Sense" – 5:17
8. "Through The Eyes Of The Children" – 6:41

== Personnel ==
Ram-Zet

- Miriam Elisabeth "Sfinx" Renvåg – lead vocals
- Kent "Kiith" Frydenlund – drums
- Henning "Zet" Ramseth – lead vocals, guitar, keyboards, stuff, lyrics
- Kjell Solem – bass

Additional musicians

- Aud Ingebjørg Barstad – violin
- Sissel Strømbu, Randi Strømbu, Anne Linne Staxrud – female vocals
- Mie Kristine Storbekken Lindstad – lyrics

Production

- Ram-Zet – arrangements, producing, engineering
- Space Valley Studios – recording studio
- Mikko Karmilla at Finnvox Studios – mixing
- Mika Jussila at Finnvox Studios – mastering

Artwork

- Torel Larsen – photography
- Lars E Nordrum – photography
- Tore L. Larsen – cover art
