= A Virgin and a Whore =

Studio album by Eternal Tears of Sorrow
- Released: 7 November 2001
- Recorded: 2001
- Studio: Tico-Tico Studio, Kemi, Finland
- Genre: Melodic death metal
- Length: 47:06
- Label: Spinefarm

Eternal Tears of Sorrow chronology
Chaotic Beauty (2000)	A Virgin and a Whore (2001)	Before the Bleeding Sun (2006)

A Virgin and a Whore is the fourth album by Finnish melodic death metal band Eternal Tears of Sorrow and features songs written by the entire band. It was their last album before their hiatus. This is the last EToS album to feature keyboardist Pasi Hiltula (who had been in the band since early 1999) and the only album to feature guitarist Antti Kokko.

The seventh song on the album, "Sick, Dirty and Mean" is a cover song, originally written and performed by Accept. The band had rehearsed the song for a two-part tribute album (Tribute to Accept Vol. 1 & 2) in 1999 but didn't have any extra time to record it. So, they decided to include the song on A Virgin and a Whore.

The album's cover art was made by Niklas Sundin of Cabin Fever Media and guitarist of Dark Tranquillity.

== Track listing ==
No.	Title	Lyrics	Music	Length
1.	"Aurora Borealis"	Veteläinen & Puolakanaho	Kokko & Hiltula & Puolakanaho & Veteläinen	5:04
2.	"Heart of Wilderness"	Veteläinen & Puolakanaho	Kokko & Hiltula	3:40
3.	"Prophetian"	Veteläinen & Puolakanaho & Sankala	Hiltula & Puolakanaho & Kokko	5:24
4.	"Fall of Man"	Puolakanaho & Veteläinen	Puolakanaho & Hiltula	4:58
5.	"The River Flows Frozen"	Veteläinen & Kokko & Puolakanaho	Kokko & Puolakanaho	5:47
6.	"The Last One for Life"	Veteläinen & Puolakanaho	Veteläinen & Puolakanaho & Kokko & Hiltula	4:59
7.	"Sick, Dirty and Mean"	Accept	Accept	4:16
8.	"Blood of Hatred"	Veteläinen	Kokko & Hiltula	3:12
9.	"Aeon"	Veteläinen & Puolakanaho	Veteläinen & Hiltula & Puolakanaho & Kokko	5:45

Japanese edition bonus tracks:

10. "As I Die" (Paradise Lost cover) – 4:03
11. "The River Flows Frozen" (Acoustic Reprise) – 6:07

== Credits ==
=== Band members ===
- Altti Veteläinen – vocals, bass
- Jarmo Puolakanaho – guitar
- Antti Kokko – lead guitar
- Pasi Hiltula – keyboards
- Petri Sankala – drums

=== Guest appearances ===
- Juha Kylmänen – clean vocals (on tracks 5, 6 and 11)
