= Pirun nyrkki =

Studio album by Turmion Kätilöt
- Released: 28 March 2006
- Genre: Industrial metal
- Length: 35:02
- Label: Spinefarm Records

Turmion Kätilöt chronology
Hoitovirhe (2004)	Pirun nyrkki (2006)	U.S.C.H.! (2008)

Pirun nyrkki (English: Piru's Fist), released on 29 March 2006 by Spinefarm Records, is the second full-length album from the Finnish industrial metal band Turmion Kätilöt. A pirunnyrkki is also a wooden puzzle, called a burr puzzle or a piston puzzle in English.

== Track listing ==
No.	Title	Length
1.	"Mistä veri pakenee (Feat. Killzone)" ("Where the Blood Escapes From")	4:32
2.	"Pirun nyrkki" ("Devil's Fist")	3:48
3.	"Messu" ("Mass")	0:56
4.	"Eläköön!" ("Long Live!")	2:59
5.	"Tirehtööri" ("Ringmaster")	4:08
6.	"MTV/DNA"	3:54
7.	"Härkä" ("The Bull")	2:06
8.	"Illuusio musiikista" ("Illusion of Music")	0:26
9.	"Irstauden ilosanoma (With Jessi Frey of Velcra)" ("The Gospel of Lubricity")	3:29
10.	"Piiloviestien neitietsivä" ("Nancy Drew of Hidden Messages")	2:03
11.	"Verta ja lihaa (Proteus mental remix)" ("Blood and Flesh")	6:41
