= Escape (Ram-Zet album) =

2002 album by Ram-Zet

Studio album by Ram-Zet
- Released: (United States) April 30, 2002
- Genres: Avant-garde metal, progressive black metal
- Length: 63:35
- Labels: Spinefarm Records; Century Media Records
- Producer: Zet

Ram-Zet chronology
Pure Therapy (2000)	Escape (2002)	Intra (2005)

Professional ratings
Review scores
Source	Rating
AllMusic	4/5 stars

Escape is the second album by avant-garde metal band Ram-Zet released on April 30, 2002 in the US by Spinefarm Records and Century Media Records. The band produced the album themselves. They recorded and engineered it at their personal studio in Norway, Space Valley Studios.

== Track listing ==
1. "R.I.P." - 8:54
2. "Queen" - 7:03
3. "The Claustrophobic Journey" - 7:54
4. "Sound of Tranquillity - Peace" - 8:41
5. "The Seeker" - 9:18
6. "Pray" - 6:59
7. "I'm Not Dead" - 6:38
8. "The Moment She Died" - 8:08

== Personnel ==
Ram-Zet

- Miriam Elisabeth "Sfinx" Renvåg - lead vocals
- Küth - drums
- Magnus Østvang - keyboards, stuff
- Henning "Zet" Ramseth - lead vocals, guitar, lyrics
- Solem - bass
- Ingvild "Sareeta" Johannesen - violin, backing vocals

Additional musicians

- Sissel Strømbu, Renate Grimsbø Kuldbrandstad, Randi Strømbu, Mari Bakke Ottinsen, Ane Thune Børresen - Choirs
- Mie Kristine Storbekken Lindstad - lyrics

Production

- Ram-Zet - arrangements, producing, engineering
- Space Valley Studios - recording studio
- Mikko Karmilla at Finnvox Studios - mixing
- Mika Jussila at Finnvox Studios - mastering

Artwork

- Torel Larsen - photography
- Aage Villy Skaaret - photography
- Yngve Sørli - cover model
- Sunniva Daae Andersen - cover model
