= Return (band) =

Norwegian rock band

Return is a Norwegian rock band from Stange Municipality in Hedmark county (now part of Innlandet county). The band started in 1980 and was in its prime in the late 1980s and early 1990s. In this period, they had several singles on the Norwegian hit charts and were among the bestselling bands in the country. They won "NRK´s Rockemønstring" in 1985. In 1993 the band took a break but came back in 2001 with a collection and some gigs. In 2005, they released a new studio album, and in 2008, they released another collection which also includes a DVD with shots from a concert in Hamar in 2007.

The band's musical style has gone through minimal changes through almost three decades; they have kept most of the typical 1980s rock, with a substantial amount of power ballads.

The band have hits in their native Norway and in other countries such as Switzerland.

== Band members ==
- Knut Erik Østgård- Vocals, guitar, keyboard
- Tore Larsen- Bass
- Øyvind Håkonsen- Drums
- Henning Ramseth- Guitar
- Magnus Østvang- Keyboard

In addition, Magnus Østvang has contributed on synthesizer and chorus. Henning Ramseth was for a longer period with the band as a supplement musician on keyboards and guitar (Henning Ramseth has his own band, Ram-Zet).

== Discography ==
=== Studio albums ===
- To the Top (1987)
- Attitudes (1988)
- Straight Down the Line (1989)
- Fourplay (1991)
- V (1992)
- Return (2005)

=== Live albums ===
- Return (2000)

=== Compilation albums ===
- Replay (1991) Demo Tape
- Return (Best of...) (2000)
- Best of...both worlds (2008)
