= The Long Play =

Studio album by Sandra
- Released: 11 November 1985
- Recorded: 1985
- Genres: Synth-pop; Europop; pop; disco
- Length: 37:15
- Label: Virgin
- Producer: Michael Cretu

Sandra chronology
The Long Play (1985)	Mirrors (1986)

Singles from The Long Play
- 1. "(I'll Never Be) Maria Magdalena" Released: July 15, 1985; 2. "In the Heat of the Night" Released: November 1985; 3. "Little Girl" Released: January 1986

The Long Play is the debut studio album by German singer Sandra, released on 11 November 1985 by Virgin Records. The album was a great commercial success and spawned Sandra's signature number-one single "(I'll Never Be) Maria Magdalena" as well as the international top-five single "In the Heat of the Night".

== Singles ==
The lead single "(I'll Never Be) Maria Magdalena" was released in March 1985 and went on to top the charts in 21 countries worldwide. It spent 16 weeks in the German top 20, remaining Sandra's only chart-topper in her home country, and is now considered her signature song.

"In the Heat of the Night" was chosen as the follow-up single to "Maria Magdalena" in late 1985. The song charted within the top five in a number of European countries, later earning Sandra second place at the Tokyo Music Festival in 1986. The single version would only become available on CD on The Platinum Collection in 2009.

The third and final commercial single taken from The Long Play was "Little Girl", released in early 1986. The song's music video was filmed entirely on location in Venice, Italy. "Little Girl" met with modest success in international music market.

"Sisters and Brothers" was released in 1988 as a promotional single in Japan only. The song, dedicated to Sandra's brother Gaston, is a cover version of Michael Cretu's song "Zeitlose Reise" from his 1983 solo album Legionäre.

== Legacy ==
In 2026, a new edition of the album was issued with colored vinyls.

== Track listing ==
Side one
No.	Title	Writer(s)	Length
1.	"In the Heat of the Night"	Michael Cretu; Hubert Kemmler; Klaus Hirschburger; Markus Löhr	5:20
2.	"On the Tray (Seven Years)"	Kemmler; Cretu; Hirschburger	3:45
3.	"Little Girl"	Kemmler; Löhr; Cretu; Hirschburger	3:11
4.	"You and I"	Cretu; Richard Palmer-James	6:44

Side two
No.	Title	Writer(s)	Length
5.	"(I'll Never Be) Maria Magdalena"	Kemmler; Löhr; Cretu; Palmer-James	5:55
6.	"Heartbeat (That's Emotion)"	Reinhard Besser; Marc Cassandra; Chris Chirney	4:53
7.	"Sisters and Brothers"	Cretu; Palmer-James	3:23
8.	"Change Your Mind"	Cretu; Palmer-James	4:04
Total length:			37:15

== Personnel ==
Credits adapted from the liner notes of The Long Play.

- Sandra – lead vocals
- Michael Cretu – digital and conventional keyboards, drum computers, background vocals, arrangement, production
- Markus Löhr – guitars
- Hubert Kemmler – background vocals
- Mike Schmidt – cover design
- Dieter Eikelpoth – photography

== Charts ==
=== Weekly charts ===
Weekly chart performance for The Long Play
Chart (1985–2026)	Peak position
Austrian Albums (Ö3 Austria)	18
Dutch Albums (Album Top 100)	43
European Albums (Eurotipsheet)	17
Finnish Albums (Suomen virallinen lista)	1
German Albums (Offizielle Top 100)	12
German Pop Albums (Offizielle Top 100)	18
Icelandic Albums (Tónlist)	4
Norwegian Albums (VG-lista)	8
Spanish Albums (AFYVE)	25
Swedish Albums (Sverigetopplistan)	2
Swiss Albums (Schweizer Hitparade)	4

=== Year-end charts ===
Year-end chart performance for The Long Play
Chart (1986)	Position
European Albums (Music & Media)	49
German Albums (Offizielle Top 100)	60

== Certifications ==
Certifications for The Long Play
Region	Certification	Certified units/sales
Finland (Musiikkituottajat)	Platinum	59,176
France (SNEP)	Gold	100,000^{*}
Germany (BVMI)	Gold	250,000^{^}
Greece (IFPI Greece)	Platinum	100,000^{^}
Norway (IFPI Norway)	Platinum	50,000^{*}
Sweden (GLF)	Platinum	100,000^{^}
Switzerland (IFPI Switzerland)	Platinum	50,000^{^}
^{*} Sales figures based on certification alone.^{^} Shipments figures based on certification alone.

== Release history ==
Date	Label	Format	Catalog number
1985	Virgin	LP	207 356-630
1985	Virgin	CD	610 627-225
1985	Virgin	Cassette	407 356-630
1992	Virgin	CD	077778696827
