= Chaotic Beauty =

Studio album by Eternal Tears of Sorrow
- Released: 2000
- Recorded: November–December 1999
- Studio: Tico-Tico Studio (Kemi, Finland)
- Genre: Melodic death metal
- Length: 39:34 (Japan: 58:19)
- Label: Spinefarm

Eternal Tears of Sorrow chronology
Vilda Mánnu (1998)	Chaotic Beauty (2000)	A Virgin and a Whore (2001)

Chaotic Beauty is the third album by Finnish melodic death metal band Eternal Tears of Sorrow. It was their first album without the original three founding members of the band (guitarist Olli-Pekka Törrö had left the band in early 1999) and the first EToS album with a five-member line-up.

The guest vocalist on the album was Kimberly Goss of Sinergy, and Heli Luokkala on the Japanese bonus CD. The song "Black Tears" is a cover, originally written by Dan Swanö for his band Edge of Sanity.

This album continues the band's tradition to record albums with Ahti Kortelainen at Tico-Tico Studio in Kemi, Finland. However, this is the first EToS album that Mikko Karmila mixed; before Chaotic Beauty, all albums were also mixed by Ahti Kortelainen.

== Track listing ==
No.	Title	Lyrics	Music	Length
1.	"Shattered Soul"	Puolakanaho & Veteläinen	Puolakanaho & Hiltula	3:55
2.	"Blood of Faith Stains My Hands"	Puolakanaho & Veteläinen	Puolakanaho	4:34
3.	"Autumn's Grief"	Veteläinen	Eternal Tears of Sorrow	4:56
4.	"The Seventh Eclipse"	Veteläinen & Talala	Talala & Hiltula & Puolakanaho	4:25
5.	"Bride of the Crimson Sea"	Puolakanaho & Veteläinen	Puolakanaho & Veteläinen	5:20
6.	"Black Tears (Edge of Sanity cover)"	Dan Swanö	Dan Swanö	3:13
7.	"Tar of Chaos"	Veteläinen & Puolakanaho	Talala & Hiltula & Puolakanaho	3:19
8.	"Bhéan Sidhe"	Veteläinen & Sankala & Puolakanaho	Puolakanaho & Talala & Hiltula	4:12
9.	"Nocturnal Strains"	Veteläinen	Talala & Puolakanaho	5:30

Japanese edition bonus tracks

10. Flight of Icarus (Iron Maiden cover) – 4:14
11. Coronach – 4:54
12. Nightwind's Lullaby – 5:29
13. Burning Flames' Embrace – 4:08

== Personnel ==
=== Band members ===
- Altti Veteläinen − vocals, bass
- Jarmo Puolakanaho − guitar
- Antti-Matti Talala − lead guitar
- Pasi Hiltula − keyboards
- Petri Sankala − drums

=== Guest appearances ===
- Kimberly Goss − female vocals (on tracks 5 and 9), whispering (on track 3)
- Heli Luokkala − female vocals (on track 12, Japanese bonus CD)
