= In the Heat of the Night (Sandra song) =

- 7-inch single

Single by Sandra

from the album The Long Play
- B-side: "Heatwave"
- Released: 15 November 1985
- Length: 4:00 (7-inch single version); 7:20 (12-inch single version); 5:20 (album version)
- Label: Virgin
- Songwriters: Michael Cretu; Hubert Kemmler; Markus Löhr; Klaus Hirschburger
- Producer: Michael Cretu

Sandra singles chronology
"(I'll Never Be) Maria Magdalena" (1985)	"In the Heat of the Night" (1985)	"Little Girl" (1986)
"The Way I Am" (2007)	"In the Heat of the Night" (2007)	"What Is It About Me" (2007)

Licensed audio
- "In The Heat Of The Night" on YouTube

"In the Heat of the Night" is a song by German singer Sandra, written by Michael Cretu, Hubert Kemmler, Markus Löhr and Klaus Hirschburger and produced by Cretu. Kemmler also provided backing vocals on this recording, as well as numerous Sandra songs in the 80s.

"In the Heat of the Night" was released on 15 November 1985 as the second single from Sandra's debut album, The Long Play, as a follow-up to her no. 1 European hit "(I'll Never Be) Maria Magdalena". The single was a major commercial success, reaching the top 5 in numerous countries, including West Germany, Switzerland and Sweden, where it peaked at no. 2. It was a top 20 hit in the pan-European sales and airplay charts at the turn of 1985 and 1986. In West Germany and Austria, it was a top 5 and a top 10 airplay hit, respectively. It remains one of Sandra's biggest hits.

In 1999, the song was remixed for the compilation My Favourites and released as a promotional vinyl single in France. It was remixed again for the 2006 compilation Reflections, and subsequently in 2007 for the special edition of Reflections released in France. The 2007 remixes were released as a digital single. In 2016, "In the Heat of the Night" (Tropical Future Remix) was released as a digital single, to promote the new greatest hits collection: The Very Best of Sandra.

== Music video ==
The music video was directed by Michael Bentele and pictures Sandra performing the song in a steamy sauna, surrounded by bare-chested men. It also features drummer Wolfgang Filz, keyboardist/backing vocalist Frank Peterson, and bassist/backing vocalist Peter Ries. The clip was released on Sandra's VHS video compilations Ten on One (The Singles) and 18 Greatest Hits, released in 1987 and 1992, respectively, as well as the 2003 DVD The Complete History.

== Formats and track listings ==
- 7-inch single (1985)

A. "In the Heat of the Night"
B. "Heatwave" (Instrumental)

- 12-inch single (1985)

A. "In the Heat of the Night" (Extended Version) – 7:32
B. "Heatwave" (Instrumental) – 3:48

- 12-inch vinyl single (1999)

A. "In the Heat of the Night" (Original Version) – 5:07
B. "In the Heat of the Night" (99 Remix) – 4:28

- Digital download (2007)
1. "In the Heat of the Night" (Future Vision Remix – Radio Edit) – 3:17
2. "In the Heat of the Night" (Superfunk Remix – Radio Edit) – 3:46
3. "In the Heat of the Night" (Future Vision Remix – Extended) – 7:13
4. "In the Heat of the Night" (Superfunk Remix – Extended) – 6:00
- Digital download (2016)
1. "In the Heat of the Night" (Tropical Future Remix by masQraider) – 4:04

== Charts ==
=== Weekly charts ===
Chart (1985–1986)	Peak position
Austria (Ö3 Austria Top 40)	6
Belgium (Ultratop 50 Flanders)	3
Belgium (Ultratop 40 Wallonia)	1
Denmark (IFPI)	6
Europe (European Top 100 Singles)	18
Finland (Suomen virallinen lista)	3
France (SNEP)	5
Netherlands (Dutch Top 40)	15
Netherlands (Single Top 100)	13
South Africa (Springbok Radio)	8
Spain (AFYVE)	11
Sweden (Sverigetopplistan)	2
Switzerland (Schweizer Hitparade)	2
West Germany (GfK)	2

=== Year-end charts ===
Chart (1986)	Position
Belgium (Ultratop 50 Flanders)	36
Europe (European Hot 100 Singles)	34
West Germany (Media Control)	26

== Certifications ==
Region	Certification	Certified units/sales
France (SNEP)	Silver	250,000^{*}
^{*} Sales figures based on certification alone.

== Cover versions ==
- Finnish gothic metal band To/Die/For covered the song on their 1999 album All Eternity. When released as a single in 2000, their version reached no. 17 in Finland.
- Swedish progressive metal band Odyssey covered the song on their album Reinventing the Past.
- Cantonese version: 將冰山劈開 (“Break The Iceberg” in English translation), by Anita Mui and Andy Hui.
- German New Wave Pop band irgend released a digital single in July 2025
