= Reflexion (band) =

Finnish band

- Origin: Oulu, Finland
- Genres: Gothic metal; gothic rock; hard rock
- Years active: 1996–2010, 2023–present
- Labels: Out Of Line Music; A1 Music; Mach XX
- Members: Juha Kylmänen; Juhani Heikka; Ilkka Jolma; Mikko Uusimaa; Ilkka Leskelä
- Past members: Oskari Moilanen

Reflexion is a Finnish gothic rock band from Oulu. The band was founded in 1996 under the name BarbarianZ, before adopting the name Reflexion in 2000.

In 2006, they released their debut studio album Out of the Dark. Their 2008 album Dead to the Past, Blind for Tomorrow peaked at 30th on the Official Finnish Charts. In 2010, the band went on hiatus after the release of their third album Edge, and began playing live again in 2023.

The band's vocalist Juha Kylmänen is also the frontman of For My Pain... and Full Nothing.

== Members ==
- Juha Kylmänen – vocals
- Juhani Heikka – guitar
- Ilkka Jolma – guitar
- Mikko Uusimaa – bass
- Ilkka Leskelä – drums

== Discography ==
=== Albums ===
- 2006: Out of the Dark (A1 Music)
- 2008: Dead to the Past, Blind for Tomorrow (Mach XX)
- 2010: Edge (Mach XX)

=== Singles ===
- 2005: Undying Dreams
- 2006: Storm
- 2008: Weak and Tired
- 2008: Twilight Child

=== Demos ===
- 1997: Blackness and Moonlight (BarbarianZ)
- 1998: Run Like a Tiger (BarbarianZ)
- 1998: Lost (BarbarianZ)
- 1999: Spirit of Eclipse (BarbarianZ)
- 1999: More than Touch (BarbarianZ)
- 2001: 5th
- 2001: Destiny's Star
- 2003: Journey to Tragedy
- 2004: Smashed to Pieces
