= Freaks in Wonderland =

Studio album by Ram-Zet
- Released: January 24, 2012
- Recorded: 2011
- Genre: Avant-garde metal
- Length: 55:29
- Label: Buil2Kill Records, Space Valley Records
- Producer: Zet

Ram-Zet chronology
Neutralized (2009)	Freaks in Wonderland (2012)

Freaks in Wonderland is the fifth album by the avant-garde metal band Ram-Zet released on January 24, 2012 in the US by Buil2Kill Records.

== Track listing ==
1. "Story Without a Happy End" – 08:04
2. "I Am" – 05:50
3. "Mojo" – 06:23
4. "Land of Fury" – 06:55
5. "Madre" – 05:53
6. "Circle" – 05:49
7. "The Sign" – 06:34
8. "As the Carpet Silent Falls" – 10:01

== Credits ==
=== Ram-Zet ===
- Zet – Vocals, Guitar, Programming, Music, Lyrics, Arranging, producer
- Sfinx – Vocals, Lyrics
- Sareeta – Violin, Backing vocals
- Küth – Drums, Percussion
- Ka – Keyboards, Backing vocals
- Lanius – Bass, Didgeridoo

=== Additional musicians and production ===
- Ragnhild Amb – Hon
- Ram-Zet – Arranging, producer
- Space Valley Studios – Recording studio
- Brett Caldas-Lima at Tower Studio – Mixing, Mastering
- Lanius – Photography – Digital image processing
- Lanius, Ka, Sfinx and Zet – Cover Artwork, Cover Layout
