= Diskovibrator =

Studio album by Turmion Kätilöt
- Released: 28 September 2015
- Genre: Industrial metal
- Length: 43.12
- Label: Osasto-A Records

Turmion Kätilöt chronology
Technodiktator (2013)	Diskovibrator (2015)	Dance Panique (2017)

Diskovibrator is the sixth studio album by the Finnish industrial metal band Turmion Kätilöt, released on 28 September 2015.

== Track listing ==
No.	Title	Length
1.	"Kirottujen karnevaalit" (The Carnival of the Damned)	3:43
2.	"Aina arki" (Always Working)	3:38
3.	"Hyvissä höyryissä" (Good buzz)	3:58
4.	"Sinä saatana" (You bastard)	4:04
5.	"Ranteet auki" (Slit Wrists)	3:51
6.	"Lataa ja varmista" (Lock and Load)	4:17
7.	"Hiiltynyt runko" (The Charred Trunk)	3:40
8.	"Vastanaineet" (Just Married)	3:58
9.	"Sinulle" (For You)	4:19
10.	"To Be Contiuned [sic] Act 2"	7:44
