= Lauri Tuohimaa =

Finnish musician

Lauri Tuohimaa (born 25 January 1979) is a musician from Oulu, Finland. He played guitar in Charon (2003–2011), For My Pain... (1999–2004) and Embraze (1994–2009), in which he was also the lead vocalist. Lauri first played in a band called Maple Cross before forming Embraze with drummer Ilkka Leskelä, Petri Hennell and Mikko Aaltonen under the name Embrace. His influences include Pantera and CMX.

== Discography ==
=== Albums ===
- Allotria (1995) with Embraze (As Embrace)
- 96 (1996) with Embraze (As Embrace)
- Demo 3 (1996) with Embraze (As Embrace)
- IV (1997) with Embraze (As Embrace)
- LAEH (1998) with Embraze
- Intense (1999) with Embraze
- Endless Journey (2001) With Embraze
- Katharsis (2002) with Embraze
- Fallen(2003) with For My Pain...
- The Dying Daylights (2003) with Charon
- Songs for the Sinners (2005) with Charon
- The Last Embrace (2006) with Embraze
- Buried Blue (2026) with For My Pain...

=== Singles ===
- "Sin, Love and the Devil" (1999) with Embraze
- "In Trust of No One" (2003) with Charon
- "Religious/Delicious" (2003) with Charon
- "Killing Romance" (2004) with For My Pain...
- "Ride on Tears" (2005) with Charon
- "Colder" (2005) with Charon
- "The One" (2006) with Embraze
- "Close Your Eyes" (2011) with Union of the Slaves

=== Compilations ===
- Metal Rock Cavalcade II (2003), Embraze- "My Star"
- Mastervox Metal Single, Embraze- "Chemical Warfare" (Slayer Cover)
- Straight to Hell- A Tribute to Slayer, Embraze- "Chemical Warfare"
- Metalliliitto II- Embraze- "Close my Stage"
