= Dance Panique =

Studio album by Turmion Kätilöt
- Released: 17 March 2017
- Recorded: 2016
- Genre: Industrial metal
- Length: 41:44
- Label: Osasto-A Records

Turmion Kätilöt chronology
Diskovibrator (2015)	Dance Panique (2017)	Universal Satan (2018)

Professional ratings
Review scores
Source	Rating
Imperiumi.net	7/10
Inferno	4/5 stars
Kaaoszine	7/10
Soundi	3/5 stars

Dance Panique is the seventh studio album by Finnish industrial metal band Turmion Kätilöt, released on March 17, 2017 on the label Osasto-A Records. It is their last album with vocalist Tuomas Rytkönen after he left the band in January 2017. The album was originally scheduled to be released on February 10, 2017, but the release was postponed for a few weeks after the band's singer MC Raaka Pee fell ill during the production of the album.

== Background ==
In November 2016, the band announced that they would release new music in the following month. The single "Surutulitus" was released digitally on December 16, 2016 together with "Itämaan tietäjä".

The band went on the "Dance Panique Spring Tour 2017" tour in March until the beginning of June.

== Track listing ==
No.	Title	Length
1.	"Dance Panique"	3:43
2.	"Veren maku" (The Taste of Blood)	3:29
3.	"Surutulitus" (Fireworks)	4:58
4.	"Kyynelten tanssi" (Dance of Tears)	3:51
5.	"Uhriveri" (Sacrifical Blood)	3:16
6.	"Vihko" (Booklet)	4:48
7.	"Pienet pirut" (Little Devils)	3:40
8.	"Viha" (Anger)	3:27
9.	"Kuoleman marssi" (Death March)	3:26
10.	"To Be Contiuned [sic], kohtaus 3" (To Be Continued, Scene 3)	7:06
