= Vilda Mánnu =

Studio album by Eternal Tears of Sorrow
- Released: July 1998
- Recorded: 1998
- Studio: Tico-Tico Studio (Kemi, Finland)
- Genre: Melodic death metal
- Length: 43:37
- Label: Spinefarm Records
- Producer: Ahti Kortelainen

Eternal Tears of Sorrow chronology
Sinner's Serenade (1997)	Vilda Mánnu (1998)	Chaotic Beauty (2000)

Vilda Mánnu is the second album by Finnish metal band Eternal Tears of Sorrow. It contains the band's first guest vocals (by Heli Luokkala, known from Nicepappi). It is also the last EToS album with their original line-up as one of the co-founders of the band, Olli-Pekka Törrö, left the band a few months after the release of this album.

The title of the album (as well as the name of the title song), Vilda Mánnu, is Northern Sami language and means "Wild Moon" in English. There is also another Sami song title on the album, Goashem, which (in the form "goas'kem") is Old Sami language for "an eagle".

== Track listing ==
No.	Title	Lyrics	Music	Length
1.	"Northern Doom"	Törrö & Veteläinen	Törrö	4:35
2.	"Burning Flames' Embrace"	Eternal Tears of Sorrow	Puolakanaho	4:07
3.	"Goashem"	Puolakanaho & Veteläinen	Puolakanaho & Veteläinen	3:53
4.	"Scars of Wisdom"	Törrö & Veteläinen	Törrö	4:56
5.	"Raven (In Your Eyes)"	Törrö	Törrö	5:35
6.	"Nightwind's Lullaby"	Veteläinen & Puolakanaho	Eternal Tears of Sorrow	5:28
7.	"Vilda Mánnu"	Eternal Tears of Sorrow	Törrö & Veteläinen	5:52
8.	"Coronach"	Eternal Tears of Sorrow	Puolakanaho	4:54
9.	"Nodde Rahgam"		Törrö	1:12
10.	"Seita"	Veteläinen & Törrö	Törrö & Veteläinen	3:06

== Credits ==
=== Band members ===
- Altti Veteläinen − vocals, bass
- Jarmo Puolakanaho − guitar, keyboards
- Olli-Pekka Törrö − guitar, keyboards

=== Guest appearances ===
- Heli Luokkala − female vocals (on tracks 5 and 6)
