= Sinner's Serenade =

Studio album by Eternal Tears of Sorrow
- Released: September 1997
- Genre: Melodic death metal
- Length: 43:43
- Label: X-Treme Records

Eternal Tears of Sorrow chronology
Bard's Burial (demo) (1994)	Sinner's Serenade (1997)	Vilda Mánnu (1998)

Sinner's Serenade is the debut album by the Finnish metal band Eternal Tears of Sorrow. It was recorded and mixed in only five days – the three last songs from the Bard's Burial demo tape in just one day and the rest of the songs in four days. It was released by X-treme Records, a Gothenburg-based label.

== Track listing ==
No.	Title	Lyrics	Music	Length
1.	"Dawn"		Puolakanaho	0:52
2.	"Another One Falls Asleep"	Puolakanaho & Veteläinen	Puolakanaho	5:37
3.	"The Law of the Flames"	Veteläinen	Törrö	3:41
4.	"Dirge"	Veteläinen	Törrö	5:26
5.	"Into the Deepest Waters"		Puolakanaho	1:58
6.	"Sinner's Serenade"	Törrö & Veteläinen	Törrö & Veteläinen	5:02
7.	"My God, the Evil Wind"	Törrö & Veteläinen	Törrö	4:40
8.	"March"	Puolakanaho	Puolakanaho	4:56
9.	"Bard's Burial"	Törrö	Törrö	1:29
10.	"The Son of the Forest"	Puolakanaho	Puolakanaho	4:23
11.	"Empty Eyes"	Törrö & Veteläinen	Törrö	5:39

== Credits ==
- Altti Veteläinen − vocals, bass
- Jarmo Puolakanaho − guitar, keyboards
- Olli-Pekka Törrö − guitar, keyboards
