= For My Pain... =

Finnish gothic metal band

- Origin: Oulu, Finland
- Genres: Gothic metal
- Years active: 1999–2005, 2023–present
- Labels: Spinefarm Records
- Members: Lauri Tuohimaa; Altti Veteläinen; Juha Kylmänen; Olli-Pekka Törrö; Ari-Matti Pohjola; Marco Sneck
- Past members: Petri Sankala; Tuomas Holopainen; Miriam "Sfinx" Renvåg-Müller; Ellu Malkamäki

For My Pain... is a gothic metal supergroup from Oulu, Finland, featuring members from Embraze, Eternal Tears of Sorrow, Nightwish, Charon and Reflexion. The band released their debut studio album, Fallen, in 2003.

== History ==
The idea of For My Pain... started in 1999, when Altti Veteläinen and Petri Sankala, both from Eternal Tears of Sorrow, wanted to start a new project. Other members of the original lineup were Tuomas Holopainen, Lauri Tuohimaa, Olli-Pekka Törrö and Juha Kylmänen. For My Pain...'s debut album Fallen was released in 2003. Finnish music magazine Soundi gave the album three out of five stars. In 2004, the band released a single, "Killing Romance", which peaked at number seven on the official Finnish single chart.

On 13 December 2023, the band announced their reunion, alongside a show planned for 3 May 2024, and the promise of new music in 2024. They released the single, "Recoil into Darkness", on 12 April 2024. On 13 October 2025, the band announced their second studio album Buried Blue to be released on 9 January 2026, their first album in 23 years.

== Band members ==
Current

- Lauri Tuohimaa – guitars (1999–2005, 2023–present)
- Altti Veteläinen – bass (1999–2005, 2023–present)
- Juha Kylmänen – vocals (2001–2005, 2023–present)
- Olli-Pekka Törrö – guitars (2001–2005, 2023–present)
- Jarmo Kylmänen – backing vocals (2001–2005, 2023–present)
- Ari-Matti Pohjola – drums (2023–present)
- Marco Sneck – keyboards (2023–present)
- Riina Rinkinen – backing vocals (2025–present)

Former

- Petri Sankala – drums (1999–2005)
- Tuomas Holopainen – keyboards (1999–2005)
- Miriam "Sfinx" Renvåg-Müller – backing vocals (2001–2005)
- Ellu Malkamäki – backing vocals (2023–2025)

== Discography ==
Studio albums

- Fallen (2003)
- Buried Blue (2026)

Singles

- "Killing Romance" (2004)
- "Recoil Into Darkness" (2024)
- "WitchBitch Elite" (2024)
- "Hetken tie on kevyt" (Tehosekoitin cover) (2025)
- "Time Will Heal Our Wounds" (2025)
- "Windows Are Weeping" (2025)
