= Neutralized (album) =

2009 album by Ram-Zet

Studio album by Ram-Zet
- Released: October 12, 2009
- Recorded: 2008–2009
- Genre: Avant-garde metal
- Length: 59:54
- Label: Ascendance Records
- Producer: Zet

Ram-Zet chronology
Intra (2005)	Neutralized (2009)	Freaks in Wonderland (2012)

Neutralized is the fourth album by avant-garde metal band Ram-Zet released in 2010 by Ascendance Records. The album was recorded from 2008 to early 2009. Ram-Zet employed a lengthy, busy writing schedule with the album being mixed in summer of 2009 to be ready for a tentative release date of September.

== Track listing ==
No.	Title	Length
1.	"Infamia"	4:43
2.	"I Am Dirt"	5:32
3.	"222"	4:59
4.	"Addict"	10:27
5.	"God Don't Forgive"	5:05
6.	"Beautiful Pain"	10:28
7.	"To Ashes"	8:21
8.	"Requiem"	10:19
Total length:		59:54

== Credits ==
=== Ram-Zet ===
- Zet - Vocals, Guitar, Programming, Music, Lyrics, Arranging, Producer
- Sfinx - Vocals, Lyrics
- Sareeta - Violin, Backing vocals
- Küth - Drums, Percussion
- Ka - Keyboards, Backing vocals
- Lanius - Bass, Didgeridoo

=== Additional musicians and production ===
- Ram-Zet - Arranging, Producer
- Space Valley Studios - Recording studio
- Brett Caldas-Lima at Tower Studio - Mixing, Mastering
- Lanius - Photography - Digital image processing
- Lanius, Ka, Sfinx and Zet - Cover Artwork, Cover Layout
