= Hoitovirhe =

Studio album by Turmion Kätilöt
- Released: 10 December 2004
- Genre: Industrial metal
- Length: 39:06
- Label: Spinefarm Records

Turmion Kätilöt chronology
| Hoitovirhe (2004) | Pirun nyrkki (2006) |

Professional ratings
Review scores
| Source | Rating |
|---|---|
| Imperiumi.net | 8/10 |
| Soundi | 1/5 stars |
| Stormbringer | 4/5 |

Hoitovirhe (English: Malpractice), released on 10 December 2004 by Spinefarm Records, is the first full-length album by the Finnish industrial metal band Turmion Kätilöt.

== Track listing ==
| No. | Title | Length |
|---|---|---|
| 1. | "Teurastaja" ("Butcher") | 3:04 |
| 2. | "Lepositeet" ("Limb Restraint") | 3:43 |
| 3. | "Paha ihminen" ("Evil man") | 3:28 |
| 4. | "Verta ja lihaa" ("Blood and Flesh") | 3:33 |
| 5. | "Pimeyden morsian" ("Bride of the Darkness") | 5:05 |
| 6. | "Seinä" ("The Wall") | 4:03 |
| 7. | "Liitto" ("The Alliance") | 3:29 |
| 8. | "4 käskyä" ("4 commands") | 4:21 |
| 9. | "Rautaketju" ("Iron Chain") | 3:38 |
| 10. | "Osasto-A" ("Department-A") | 1:11 |
| 11. | "Kärsi" ("Suffer") | 3:31 |

== Singles ==
=== Teurastaja ===
1. "Teurastaja"
2. "4 Käskyä"

=== Verta ja lihaa ===
1. "Verta ja lihaa"
2. "Volvot ulvoo kuun savuun"
