= U.S.C.H! =

Studio album by Turmion Kätilöt
- Released: 11 June 2008
- Genre: Industrial metal
- Length: 27:05, 37:00 (physical edition)
- Label: Raha Records

Turmion Kätilöt chronology
Pirun nyrkki (2006)	U.S.C.H! (2008)	Perstechnique (2011)

U.S.C.H! (short for "Ultimate Synthetic Corrosion Helter-Skelter") is the third studio album by the Finnish industrial metal band Turmion Kätilöt. Released 11 June 2008 for free download on Turmion Kätilöt's record label Raha Records, it consists of 10 songs. The first single from the album, "Minä Määrään", was released for free download on Raha Records' website (now replaced with the free download of U.S.C.H!) on 21 May 2008. The band has announced a presale of the physical album, to be released on 13 May 2009.

A few songs from the album are known for their endings, which include secret messages, like Kuolleitten laulu's "I can't take this anymore!" which correctly played says "Minä en kestä enää!", which means "I can't take this anymore!" in Finnish. Another song like this is Destination Hades - when played backwards it says: "I want to play a game. Search the alternative endings for your U.S.C.H., and the prize will be yours! Let the hunt begin!". This hints the listeners to listen the song endings backwards.

== Track listing ==
No.	Title	Length
1.	"Vuosi 2008" ("Year 2008")	2:06
2.	"U.S.C.H!" (short for "Ultimate Synthetic Corrosion Helter-Skelter")	3:29
3.	"Pakanamaan kartta" ("Map of Pagan Land")	3:33
4.	"Kuolleitten laulu" ("The Song of the Dead")	1:29
5.	"Paha musta veri" ("Evil Black Blood")	3:45
6.	"Minä määrään" ("I Command")	3:54
7.	"Destination Hades"	1:28
8.	"Kuoleman päivä" ("The Day of Death")	4:12
9.	"Arise"	3:43
10.	"Shuttle to Venus" (Kikka cover)	3:28

Physical edition
No.	Title	Length
11.	"Hades"	4:42
12.	"Alternative Ending for Your U.S.C.H!"	0:42
13.	"Million Dollar Business"	4:31
