= Global Warning (Turmion Kätilöt album) =

Studio album by Turmion Kätilöt
- Released: 17 April 2020
- Recorded: 2019
- Genre: Industrial metal
- Length: 47:00
- Label: Nuclear Blast

Turmion Kätilöt chronology
| Universal Satan (2018) | Global Warning (2020) | Omen X (2023) |

Professional ratings
Review scores
| Source | Rating |
|---|---|
| Desibeli.net | 3/5 stars |
| Imperiumi.net | 7/10 |
| Kaaoszine | 5.5/10 |
| Soundi | 3/5 stars |
| V2 | 3/5 stars |

Global Warning is the ninth studio album by Finnish industrial metal band Turmion Kätilöt and was released on April 17, 2020.

== Track listing ==
| No. | Title | Length |
|---|---|---|
| 1. | "Naitu" (Married) | 4:11 |
| 2. | "Kyntövuohi" (A Plow Goat) | 3:36 |
| 3. | "Sylkekää siihen" (Spit On It) | 3:38 |
| 4. | "Viha ja rakkaus" (Hate and Love) | 4:25 |
| 5. | "Turvasana" (Safe Word) | 2:47 |
| 6. | "Kuoleman juuret" (The Roots of Death) | 3:55 |
| 7. | "Syvissä vesissä" (In Deep Waters) | 3:13 |
| 8. | "Sano kun riittää" (Say enough) | 3:36 |
| 9. | "Jumalauta" (Oh God) | 3:30 |
| 10. | "Revi minut auki" (Tear Me Open) | 3:06 |
| 11. | "Syntisten laulu" (Song of sinners) | 3:57 |
| 12. | "Ikävä" (Tedious) | 3:19 |
| 13. | "Mosquito à la carte (To Be Contiuned [sic] 5)" | 3:47 |
