= Perstechnique =

Studio album by Turmion Kätilöt
- Released: 23 February 2011
- Genre: Industrial metal
- Length: 38:38
- Label: Osasto-A Records

Turmion Kätilöt chronology
U.S.C.H! (2008)	Perstechnique (2011)	Technodiktator (2013)

Perstechnique is the fourth studio album by the Finnish industrial metal band Turmion Kätilöt, released on 23 February 2011. Before the album, the single "IHMISIXSIXSIX" was released digitally.

== Track listing ==
No.	Title	Length
1.	"Grand Ball"	3:36
2.	"IHMISIXSIXSIX" (Human Six Six Six)	3:37
3.	"Suolainen kapteeni" (Salty Captain)	4:15
4.	"Hanska" (Glove)	4:07
5.	"Hellbound Earth"	3:21
6.	"Lapset ja vanhemmat" (Children and Parents)	5:26
7.	"Herran toinen tuleminen" (The Second Coming of the Lord)	2:29
8.	"Verta sataa" (Raining Blood)	3:39
9.	"Rukoukset rattoisat" (Merry Prayers)	4:19
10.	"Vedetäänkö vai ei?" (Should We... Or Not?)	3:34
