= Omen X =

Studio album by Turmion Kätilöt
- Released: 13 January 2023
- Genre: Industrial metal
- Length: 39:31
- Label: Nuclear Blast

Turmion Kätilöt chronology
Global Warning (2020)	Omen X (2023)	Reset (2024)

Professional ratings
Review scores
Source	Rating
Desibeli.net	4/5 stars
Imperiumi.net	8/10
Inferno	3/5 stars
Kaaoszine	3.5/5 stars
Soundi	2/5 stars

Omen X is the tenth studio album by Finnish industrial metal band Turmion Kätilöt and was released on January 13, 2023, on the label Nuclear Blast. The songs "Isä meidän", "Sormenjälki", and "Kuolettavia vammoja" have been released as singles from the album, each of which have also been filmed in music videos directed by Rauli Ylitalo.

== Track listing ==
No.	Title	Length
1.	"Totuus" (The Truth)	3:26
2.	"Gabriel"	3:30
3.	"Vie se pois" (Take It Away)	3:50
4.	"Pyhä kolminaisuus" (Holy Trinity)	3:29
5.	"Puoli valtakuntaa" (Half the Kingdom)	3:23
6.	"Verestä sokea" (Blood Blind)	3:37
7.	"Isä meidän" (Our Father)	4:04
8.	"Sormenjälki" (Fingerprint)	3:24
9.	"Käy tanssiin" (Go Dancing)	3:46
10.	"Kun kesä kuoli" (When Summer Died)	3:33
11.	"Kuolettavia vammoja" (Fatal Injuries)	3:25

== Personnel ==
- MC Raaka Pee – vocals
- Shag-U – vocals
- Bobby Undertaker – guitars
- Master Bates – bass
- RunQ – keyboards
- DQ – drums
