= Juha Kylmänen =

Finnish singer

- Origin: Oulu, Finland
- Genres: Gothic metal
- Occupation: Singer
- Years active: 1997–present

Juha Kylmänen (born 20 January 1981) is a Finnish singer who is the lead vocalist of gothic metal bands For My Pain... and Reflexion.

== Discography ==
=== Studio albums ===
- A Virgin and a Whore (2001, with Eternal Tears of Sorrow)
- Fallen (2003, with For My Pain...)
- Out of the Dark (2006, with Reflexion)
- Dead to the Past, Blind for Tomorrow (2008, with Reflexion)
- Edge (2010, with Reflexion)
- Asphyxia (2012, with Sangre Eterna)

=== Singles ===
- "Killing Romance" (2004, with For My Pain...)
- "Undying Dreams" (2005, with Reflexion)
- "Crashing Down" (2006, with Reflexion)
- "Storm" (2006, with Reflexion)
- "Weak and Tired" (2008, with Reflexion)
