= Intra (album) =

Studio album by Ram-Zet
- Released: September 6, 2005
- Genre: Avant-garde metal Progressive metal
- Length: 53:35
- Label: Tabu Records
- Producer: Zet

Ram-Zet chronology
| Escape (2002) | Intra (2005) | Neutralized (2009) |

Professional ratings
Review scores
| Source | Rating |
|---|---|
| Allmusic | link |

Intra is the third album by avant-garde metal band Ram-Zet released on September 6, 2005 in the US by Tabu Records. It was produced by the band's founder, vocalist, and guitarist, Zet and co-produced by Ram-Zet and Daniel Bergstrand, who also mixed the album. The band recorded at their personal studio in Norway, Space Valley Studios.

== Track listing ==
1. "Final Thrill" – 5:26
2. "Left Behind as Pieces" – 4:51
3. "Enchanted" – 7:05
4. "Ballet" – 6:42
5. "Peace" – 2:06
6. "And Innocence" – 5:31
7. "Born" – 6:05
8. "Lullaby for the Dying" – 6:36
9. "Closing a Memory" – 9:13

== Credits ==
=== Ram-Zet ===
- Henning "Zet" Ramseth – vocals, guitar, music, lyrics, arranging, co-producer
- Miriam Elisabeth "Sfinx" Renvåg – vocals, lyrics
- Ingvild "Sareeta" Johannesen – violin, backing vocals
- Küth – drums
- Magnus Østvang – keyboards
- Jon Daniel – bass

=== Additional musicians and production ===
- Ram-Zet – arranging, co-producer
- Space Valley Studios – recording studio
- Daniel Bergstrand at DUG-OUT productions – co-producer, mixing
- Peter In de Betou at Tailor Maid – mastering
- Toril Cecilie Skaaraas – photography
- Raymond Alv Kristiansen Egge – photography
- Terje Johnsen – artwork
