= Technodiktator =

Studio album by Turmion Kätilöt
- Released: 27 September 2013
- Genre: Industrial metal
- Length: 42.01
- Label: Osasto-A Records

Turmion Kätilöt chronology
| Perstechnique (2011) | Technodiktator (2013) | Diskovibrator (2015) |

Technodiktator is the fifth studio album by the Finnish industrial metal band Turmion Kätilöt, released on 27 September 2013.

== Track listing ==
| No. | Title | Length |
|---|---|---|
| 1. | "Silmät sumeat" (Blurry Eyes) | 4:01 |
| 2. | "Antaa palaa" (Let it Burn) | 3:45 |
| 3. | "Nimi kivessä" (Name Engraved in Stone) | 3:55 |
| 4. | "Pyhä maa" (Holy Land) | 3:22 |
| 5. | "Jalopiina" (Noble Torment) | 4:22 |
| 6. | "Elävä koneeksi" (Living into a Machine) | 4:02 |
| 7. | "Rehtori" (Principal) | 3:54 |
| 8. | "золото/Beibe" (Gold/Baby) | 3:28 |
| 9. | "To Be Contiuned [sic] Act 1 (Note: Some editions remove the four minutes of Finnish dialogue in the middle of the track, shortening the track length to 8:28.)" | 12:32 |
