= Fear of Domination =

Finnish industrial metal band

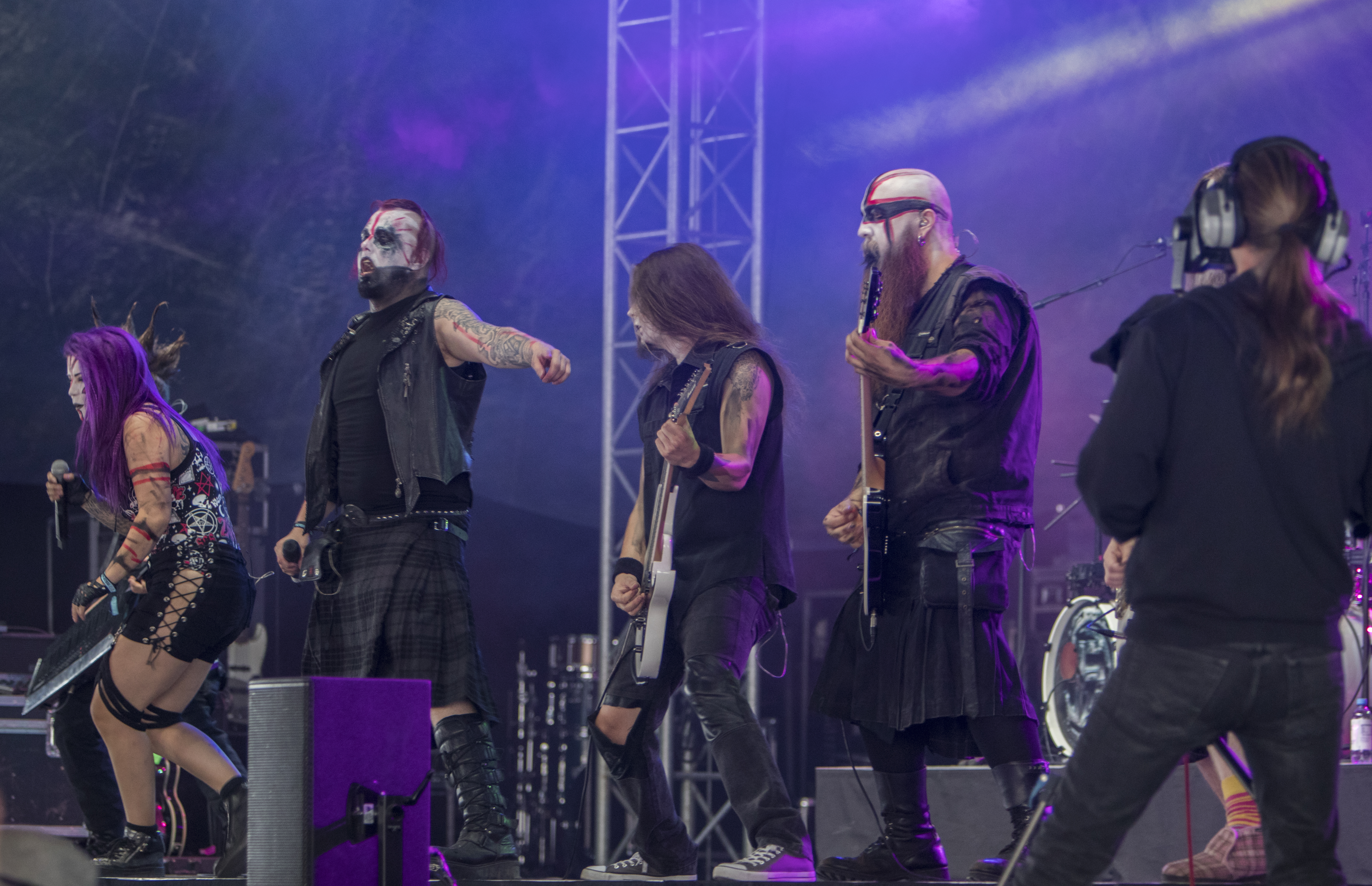
- The band in 2019

Background information
- Origin: Rajamäki, Uusimaa, Finland
- Genres: Industrial metal, shock metal, melodic death metal
- Years active: 2006-present
- Labels: Osasto-A, Inverse, Ranka Kustannus, Out of Line
- Members: Saku Solin; Lauri Ojanen; Jan-Erik Kari; Johannes Niemi; Lasse Raelahti; Jessica Salmi; Anton Nisonen
- Past members: Jaakko Arteli; Marko Salmikangas; Niina Telén; Vesa Ahlroth; Sara Strömmer; Miikki Kunttu

Fear of Domination is a Finnish industrial metal band, formed in 2006. The band has released seven studio albums.

== History ==
Formed in 2006, Fear of Domination released their first two albums, Call of Schizophrenia (2009) and Create.Control.Exterminate. (2011), before hitting the Finnish Charts with their third album Distorted Delusions (2014) reaching number 28. The album received positive feedback, and the song "Legion" spawned a music video. The band's fourth album Atlas was released in 2016, receiving mixed feedback. On 4 July 2017, the band released a cover of "The Bad Touch" by the Bloodhound Gang.

The band released their fifth album Metanoia in 2018, their first with female vocalist Sara Strömmer. Originally meant to be a replacement for Helena Haapanranta, Strömmer ultimately joined the band full-time. After releasing their next album VI: Revelation (2021), drummer Miikki Kunttu, who joined the band in 2017 alongside Strömmer, left the band due to wrist injuries. On 3 June 2024, a new single, "Monsters", was released, as part of an upcoming album. On 10 December 2025, another single, "Endgame", was released, and their seventh album was announced to be titled Katharsis and scheduled for release on 9 January 2026.

== Musical style ==
Fear of Domination and its material have been described as industrial metal, shock metal, and melodic death metal.

== Members ==
Current

- Saku Solin – lead vocals (2006–present)
- Lauri Ojanen – bass guitar (2006–present)
- Jan-Erik Kari – rhythm guitar, backing vocals (2006–present)
- Johannes Niemi – lead guitar (2007–present)
- Lasse Raelahti – keyboards (2012–present)
- Jessica Salmi – lead vocals (2021–present)
- Anton Nisonen – drums (live member: 2023–2024, full-time member: 2024–present)

Former

- Jaakko Arteli – drums (2006–2010)
- Marko Salmikangas – lead guitar, keyboards (2006–2007)
- Niina Telén – keyboards, backing and additional vocals (2007–2012)
- Vesa Ahlroth – drums (2010–2020)
- Sara Strömmer – lead vocals (2017–2021)
- Miikki Kunttu – percussion (2017–2020), drums (2020–2023)

Session

- Petja Turunen - remixing (on "Fear of Domination (MC Raaka Pee-Dominator remix)"), programming (on Create.Control.Exterminate.)
- Helena Haaparanta - vocals (live 2012–2017, on Distorted Delusions and Atlas)

== Discography ==
=== Studio albums ===
- Call of Schizophrenia (13 May 2009)

| No. | Title | Length |
|---|---|---|
| 1. | "Fear of Domination" | 4:03 |
| 2. | "Mistake in Evolution" | 4:15 |
| 3. | "Clown Industry" | 3:15 |
| 4. | "Synthetic Paradise" | 4:20 |
| 5. | "Punish Y.S." | 5:03 |
| 6. | "Intact Girl" | 4:42 |
| 7. | "Perfect World" | 4:23 |
| 8. | "Call of Schizophrenia" | 6:26 |
| 9. | "Theatre" | 3:25 |
| 10. | "Fear of Domination (MC Raaka Pee-Dominator remix)" | 5:51 |
| Total length: | | 45:43 |

- Create.Control.Exterminate. (23 November 2011)

| No. | Title | Length |
|---|---|---|
| 1. | "New World" | 3:43 |
| 2. | "Pandemonium" | 6:01 |
| 3. | "Modify" | 3:50 |
| 4. | "Destroy & Dominate" | 4:24 |
| 5. | "Coma" | 5:30 |
| 6. | "We'll Fall Apart" | 4:30 |
| 7. | "So Far So Good (All for Nothing)" | 4:40 |
| 8. | "Tool of God" | 3:41 |
| 9. | "Control Within" | 6:26 |
| 10. | "Pandemonium (Proteus Remix)" | 4:17 |
| Total length: | | 47:02 |

- Distorted Delusions (7 February 2014)

| No. | Title | Length |
|---|---|---|
| 1. | "PaperDoll" | 3:44 |
| 2. | "Wicked World" | 3:39 |
| 3. | "Violence Disciple" | 4:03 |
| 4. | "Parasite" | 5:20 |
| 5. | "Deus ex Machina" | 4:16 |
| 6. | "Organ Grinder" | 6:06 |
| 7. | "II" | 4:35 |
| 8. | "Legion" | 4:19 |
| 9. | "Needle" | 4:23 |
| 10. | "Dead Space" | 4:01 |
| 11. | "The Great Dictator" | 6:35 |
| 12. | "Legion (Kuroshio RMX)" | 4:51 |
| Total length: | | 55:52 |

- Atlas (6 May 2016)

| No. | Title | Length |
|---|---|---|
| 1. | "Misery" | 1:23 |
| 2. | "Divided" | 3:47 |
| 3. | "Primordial" | 3:50 |
| 4. | "Colossus" | 5:50 |
| 5. | "El Toro" | 3:54 |
| 6. | "Carnival Apocalypse" | 4:06 |
| 7. | "Messiah" | 4:21 |
| 8. | "Adrenaline" | 5:20 |
| 9. | "Atlas" | 4:13 |
| 10. | "Final Transmission" | 4:32 |
| Total length: | | 41:18 |

- Metanoia (4 May 2018)

| No. | Title | Length |
|---|---|---|
| 1. | "Dance with the Devil" | 4:07 |
| 2. | "Obsession" | 3:47 |
| 3. | "Face of Pain" | 3:50 |
| 4. | "Sick and Beautiful" | 3:36 |
| 5. | "Shame" | 4:54 |
| 6. | "Lie" | 3:18 |
| 7. | "We Dominate" | 3:45 |
| 8. | "The Last Call" | 4:55 |
| 9. | "Mindshifter" | 3:37 |
| 10. | "Ruin" | 4:11 |
| Total length: | | 40:00 |

- VI: Revelation (10 December 2021)

| No. | Title | Length |
|---|---|---|
| 1. | "Exitus" | 3:41 |
| 2. | "Dive Into I" | 3:34 |
| 3. | "Inner Lies" | 4:03 |
| 4. | "Formless One" | 3:52 |
| 5. | "Rust" | 3:17 |
| 6. | "Manifest" | 3:37 |
| 7. | "Amongst Gods" | 3:45 |
| 8. | "Home" | 3:55 |
| 9. | "The Greatest Harmony" | 3:15 |
| 10. | "They All Want Me to Die" | 3:50 |
| Total length: | | 36:49 |

- Katharsis (9 January 2026)

| No. | Title | Length |
|---|---|---|
| 1. | "Alone" | 4:03 |
| 2. | "Dead Anyway" | 3:17 |
| 3. | "Monsters" | 4:18 |
| 4. | "Imposter" | 3:51 |
| 5. | "Last Words" | 3:01 |
| 6. | "Primum Noce Apte" | 3:32 |
| 7. | "Rabbit Hole" | 3:24 |
| 8. | "All as One" | 3:54 |
| 9. | "Endgame" | 4:09 |
| 10. | "Feel" | 4:36 |
| Total length: | | 38:05 |

=== Demos/EPs ===
- Fear of Domination (July 2007)

| No. | Title | Length |
|---|---|---|
| 1. | "Fetish" | 2:03 |
| 2. | "Evil Twin" | 3:11 |
| 3. | "Future Without Soul" | 4:07 |
| 4. | "Homemade Crusifixion" | 4:58 |
| Total length: | | 14:19 |

- Perfect World (May 2008)

| No. | Title | Length |
|---|---|---|
| 1. | "Fear of Domination" | 3:17 |
| 2. | "Clown Industry" | 3:35 |
| 3. | "Perfect World" | 4:13 |
| Total length: | | 11:05 |

=== Singles ===
- "New World" (2010)
- "Pandemonium" (2011)
- "PaperDoll" (2013)
- "Legion" (2013)
- "Adrenaline" (2016)
- "Last Words" (2024)
