= Universal Satan =

Studio album by Turmion Kätilöt
- Released: 14 September 2018
- Recorded: 2018
- Genre: Industrial metal
- Length: 46:12
- Label: Osasto-A Records

Turmion Kätilöt chronology
Dance Panique (2017)	Universal Satan (2018)	Global Warning (2020)

Professional ratings
Review scores
Source	Rating
Kaaoszine	9/10
Keskisuomalainen	3/5 stars
Soundi	3/5 stars
V2	4/5 stars

Universal Satan is the eighth studio album by Finnish industrial metal band Turmion Kätilöt, released on September 14, 2018. The album went directly to the number one in the 2018 Finnish official list.

== Background ==
The completion of the album was preceded by a free media release issued by the band on their Facebook page in April 2018, which explained the decision made in 2017 to disband the band at the end of the year, because "it would be the right time to start getting to know their wives and families better" and "disco is not suitable for grown men". However, the band is still active.

The final track, "To Be Contiuned [sic] 4, Je Taime" features actor Heikki Kinnunen.

== Track listing ==
No.	Title	Length
1.	"Verenperintö" (Blood Inheritance)	5:02
2.	"Itseensäsekaantuja" (Self-Interfering)	3:19
3.	"Sikiö" (Fetus)	3:58
4.	"Love is Dead"	4:03
5.	"Viimeinen matka" (Last Journey)	4:03
6.	"Helvetin torvet" (Horns of Hell)	5:16
7.	"Rangaistus" (Penalty)	3:48
8.	"Suurempi voima" (Greater Power)	4:31
9.	"Saatanan siunaama" (Blessed by Satan)	4:27
10.	"Faster Than God"	3:26
11.	"To Be Contiuned [sic] 4, Je Taime" (To Be Continued 4, I Love You)	4:19
