= Eternal Tears of Sorrow =

Finnish metal band

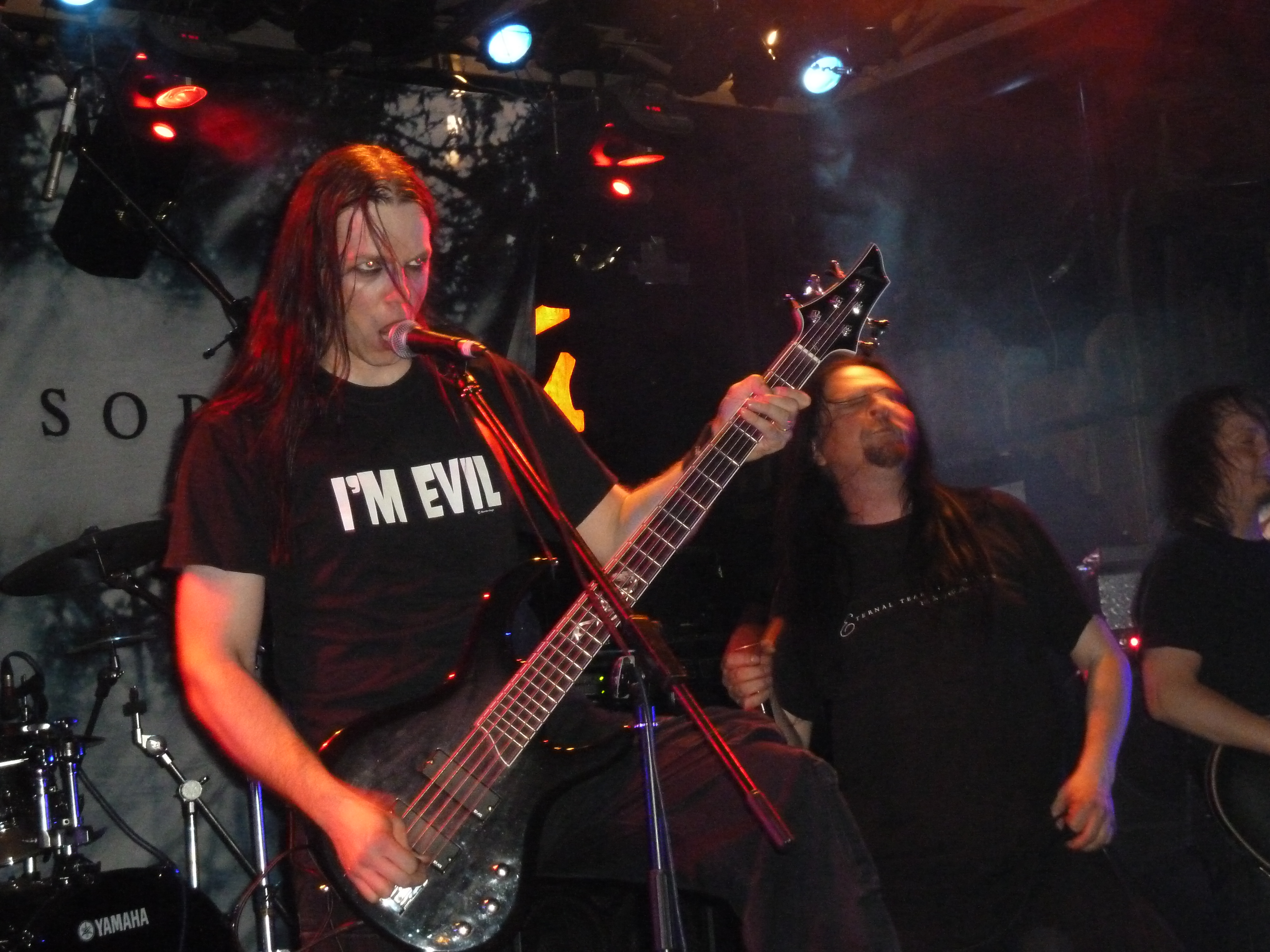
- The band performing in 2010

Background information
- Origin: Pudasjärvi, Finland
- Genres: Melodic death metal, symphonic metal
- Years active: 1994–2003; 2005–2025
- Labels: Suomen Musiikki, Spinefarm, X-Treme, Drakkar, NEMS, Fono, Massacre, King, Marquee/Avalon
- Past members: Altti Veteläinen; Jarmo Kylmänen; Jarmo Puolakanaho; Risto Ruuth; Janne Tolsa; Juho Raappana; Olli-Pekka Törrö; Pasi Hiltula; Antti-Matti Talala; Antti Kokko; Petri Sankala; Mika Lammassaari
- Website: eternaltears.fi

Eternal Tears of Sorrow (commonly abbreviated to EToS) was a Finnish melodic death metal band formed in Pudasjärvi.

== Biography ==
Jarmo Puolakanaho, Altti Veteläinen and Olli-Pekka Törrö formed the band in 1994, after various projects that featured people who became members of Eternal Tears of Sorrow. Andromeda, a first death/doom/thrash metal project, was put on hold in late 1992 because the rehearsal place had burned down. They could not find a new rehearsal place in their hometown, so the three members started a new side-project (M.D.C.) and recorded a demo tape, Beyond the Fantasy, in autumn 1993.

In spring 1994, they recorded a new demo, The Seven Goddesses of Frost. The band changed their name to something they felt more appropriate, opting for Eternal Tears of Sorrow. Between 1994 and 1996, the band had a couple of songs on some compilation CDs in Europe and Canada, and recorded their debut, Sinner's Serenade. It took more than a year for the debut album to be released by X-Treme Records, a small underground label from Gothenburg in Sweden. After they recorded their second album, Vilda Mánnu, Spinefarm Records signed the band.

Their third album, Chaotic Beauty (on which the band had three new members since Olli-Pekka Törrö had left the band), led to a European tour with Nightwish and Sinergy. Their fourth album, A Virgin and a Whore, went to the Finnish Album Top 40 charts. After releasing four albums, the band announced they were taking a break after the release of A Virgin and a Whore. They broke up in January 2003.

In February 2005, the band announced they were making a comeback. Their fifth album, Before the Bleeding Sun, was released in April 2006 (excluding releases in Russia and Japan that were released later). This album went to the Finnish Album Top 40 charts, to No. 26. The band added two session members since Petri Sankala and Janne Tolsa were unavailable.

In late 2008, the band announced that Jarmo Kylmänen (who had been part of the band's songwriting team since 2005) had joined the band as an official member. After that, drummer Petri Sankala left because of back pain. In early April 2009, it was reported that Risto Ruuth had left the band. They replaced him with Mika Lammassaari and started rehearsing for the postponed live shows originally planned for May.

The band's sixth album, Children of the Dark Waters, came out in May 2009 through Suomen Musiikki in Finland, Massacre Records in the rest of Europe, and Marquee/Avalon in Asia. The single "Tears of Autumn Rain" was released in Finland and Japan as well as on the band's MySpace page. The other track on the single was a re-recorded version of "Vilda Mánnu" from their second album. Children of the Dark Waters charted at No. 19 at the Finnish Album Top 40 charts.

The seventh album, Saivon Lapsi, was released in February 2013.

On 2 February 2025, the band announced on their social media that they had disbanded.

== Band members ==
=== Final lineup ===
- Altti Veteläinen – vocals, bass (1994–2025)
- Jarmo Puolakanaho – guitars (1994–2025)
- Risto Ruuth – guitars (2005–2009, 2018–2025)
- Janne Tolsa – keyboards (2005–2025)
- Jarmo Kylmänen – clean vocals (2008–2025)
- Juho Raappana – drums (2008–2025)

=== Former ===
- Olli-Pekka Törrö – guitars (1994–1999)
- Antti-Matti Talala – guitars (1999–2000)
- Pasi Hiltula – keyboards (1999–2003; session 2009–2010)
- Antti Kokko – guitars (2000–2003), bass (session 1997–1998)
- Petri Sankala – drums (1999–2008; session 1997–1998)
- Mika Lammassaari – guitars (2009–2018)

=== Session ===
- Pekka Kokko – bass guitar (1999)
- Heidi Määttä – keyboards (2000)
- Juha Kylmänen – clean vocals (2001)
- Veli-Matti Kananen – keyboards (2006–2007; 2010)
- Tuomo Laikari – drums (2006–2007)

== Discography ==
Studio albums

- Sinner's Serenade (1997)
- Vilda Mánnu (1998)
- Chaotic Beauty (2000)
- A Virgin and a Whore (2001)
- Before the Bleeding Sun (2006)
- Children of the Dark Waters (2009)
- Saivon Lapsi (2013)
