= MC Raaka Pee =

Finnish singer

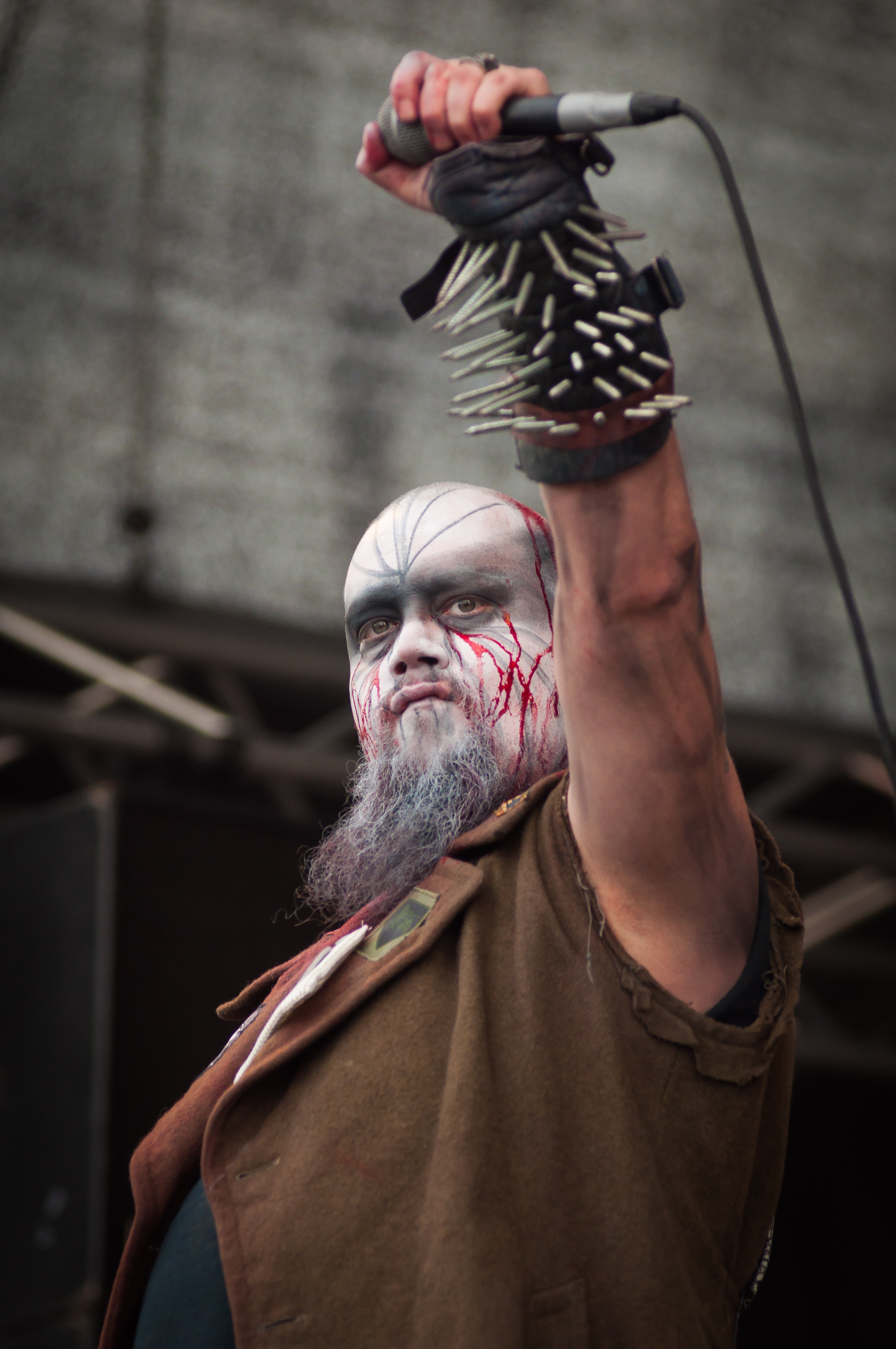
- MC Raaka Pee performing in 2013

Background information
- Birth name: Petja Turunen
- Born: November 19, 1980 (age 44); Siilinjärvi, Finland
- Genres: Industrial metal; death metal; black metal; gothic metal; hardcore techno; house; folk; humppa; tango
- Occupation: Musician
- Instruments: Vocals; keyboards; guitar
- Years active: 1996–present
- Member of: Turmion Kätilöt
- Formerly of: 2 Times Terror; Ancient Drive; Aeon
- Website: turmionkatilot.com

Petja Turunen (born 19 November 1980), known professionally as MC Raaka Pee, is a Finnish metal vocalist and the co-founder and lead singer of Turmion Kätilöt. He plays the keyboard and guitar as well. He owns the record label OSASTO-A.

Raaka Pee has a side project named 2 Times Terror that released its debut album in 2010. Raaka Pee is also playing guitar in the music video and debut album for 2 Times Terror.

As Raaka Pee, he has sung backing vocals in Tarot's album Crows Fly Black. and has been a DJ as well as folk, humppa and tango musician. Raaka Pee also did parts of the keyboards for Project Silence's 2010 released song Stardancer (Raven's whore). He also has sung backing vocals for Black Light Discipline and performed shows with them. He has done remixes for Ruoska, Blood and Fear of Domination.

On 7 December 2012, Turunen suffered a serious stroke.

== Remixes ==
- Blood – Gotika [MC Raaka Pee Remix]
- Ruoska – Irti [MC Raaka Pee Remix]
- Ruoska – Kosketa [MC Raaka Pee "Päätä Seinään" Remix]
- Fear of Domination – Fear of Domination [MC Raaka Pee Remix]
- Pain – Dirty Woman [MC Raaka Pee Remix]
- Rainbowcrash – Zeitgeist [MC Raaka Pee Remix]
