= Suomen Musiikki =

Finnish independent record label

KHY Suomen Musiikki
- Founded: 2005
- Founder: Kari Hynninen
- Status: Active
- Genre: Various
- Country of origin: Finland
- Location: Helsinki
- Official website: suomenmusiikki.fi

Suomen Musiikki (KHY Suomen Musiikki Oy) is a Finnish independent record label formed by Kari Hynninen in 2005. The company's main business is the sound record publishing. The founder and CEO of the label is Kari Hynninen.

== Artists ==
The most known musicians (bands) on the label are:

- 45 Degree Woman
- Amberian Dawn
- The Crash
- Dalindèo
- Dingo
- Egotrippi
- Eternal Tears of Sorrow
- Fork
- Hay And Stone
- John McGregor
- Jukka Poika
- Lama
- Lighthouse Project
- Norther
- Pelle Miljoona United
- Siiri Nordin
- Tacere
- Starflower

== See also ==
- List of record labels
