= Jules Näveri =

Finnish singer

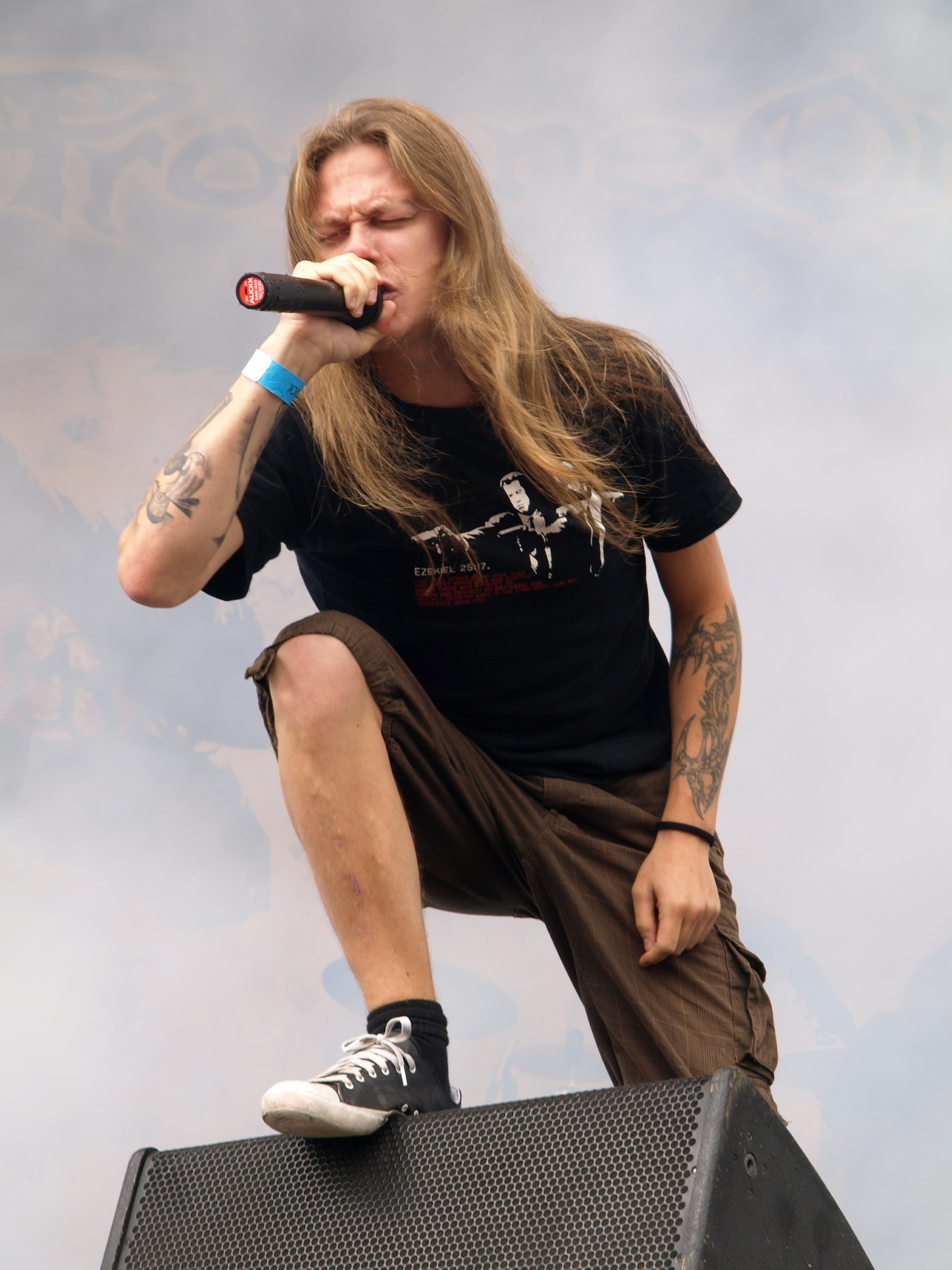
Jules Näveri at Myötätuulirock 2011

Jules Näveri is a Finnish singer who is known for his vast range of singing. He sings in bands called Profane Omen and Enemy of the Sun (band). He has also been a member of a Finnish band Misery Inc.

Näveri has performed as a guest vocalist on stage and on record with such acts like Insomnium, Amoral, myGRAIN etc.

== Discography ==
With Profane Omen

- Beaten Into Submission 2006
- Disconnected EP 2007
- Inherit The Void 2009
- Destroy! 2011
- Reset 2014

With Enemy of the Sun (band)

- Shadows 2007
- Caedium 2010

With Misery Inc.

- Random End 2006

== Guest appearances ==
Misery Inc. - Yesterday's Grave 2003
myGRAIN - Signs of Existence 2008
Chaosweaver - Puppetmaster of Pandemonium 2008
Insomnium - Across the Dark 2009
Vertigo Steps - The Melancholy Hour 2010
