= Misterer =

Finnish metal band

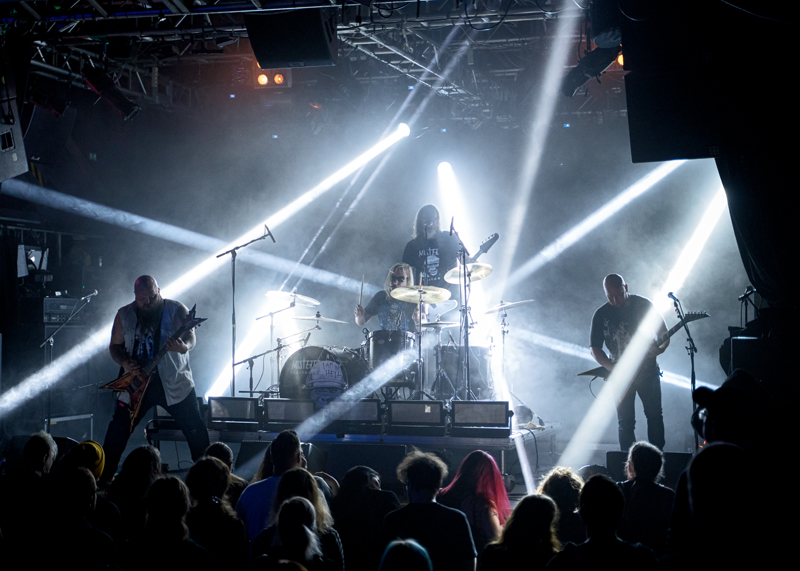
- Misterer performing in 2019

Background information
- Origin: Helsinki, Finland
- Genres: Thrash metal, groove metal
- Years active: 2017–present
- Labels: Three Chords Music
- Members: Mikko Herranen; Juhani Flinck; Timo Hänninen; Beavis
- Website: www.misterer.rocks

Misterer is a Finnish thrash/groove metal band from Helsinki.

== Biography ==
Misterer was founded by multi-instrumentalist, singer and producer Mikko Herranen in Helsinki in the fall 2017. Herranen (RUST, Velcra, Mauron Maiden) is joined by Juhani Flinck (Dead Shape Figure, Hope) on guitar, Timo Hänninen (Iiwanajulma, Cro Loner, Velcra) on guitar and Beavis (Of All Times) on bass.

Misterer's first single and a music video for Backrage was released worldwide in March 2018. The second single Disconnected followed in May. Released in August 2018, their third single Perkelation tells a tragicomic story on how the Finns get hammered every weekend and occasionally express their feelings in a drunken brawl in queue for the grill or a taxi.

Misterer releases its debut album Ignoramus on digital download and streaming services and as a CD and a cassette on 24 April 2019.

On 18 December 2020, Misterer released their second full-length album Under Attack. The first two singles We Kill and Totalitarian featured guest musicians Samy Elbanna and MC Raaka Pee respectively. Other guests on Under Attack include Marko Hietala, Matias Kupiainen, Petri Lindroos, Ben Varon and Niki Jurmu. The album has been reviewed to feature interesting turns and dynamics that change the soundscape as well as groove with thrash and industrial elements.

== Members ==
- Mikko Herranen – lead vocals, drums
- Juhani Flinck – guitars, backing vocals
- Timo Hänninen – guitars, backing vocals
- Beavis – bass, backing vocals

== Discography ==
Singles

- Backrage (March 2018)
- Disconnected (May 2018)
- Perkelation (August 2018)
- I Am a God (April 2019)
- Money (September 2019)
- Perkelation (August 2018)
- We Kill (October 2020)
- Totalitarian (November 2020)

EPs

- Fierce Retaliation (February 2020)

Albums

- Ignoramus (April 2018)
- Under Attack (December 2020)
