= In Sequence =

Studio album by Amoral
- Released: February 5, 2016
- Genres: Melodic death metal, power metal, progressive metal
- Length: 55:40
- Label: Imperial Cassette
- Producers: Ben Varon, Masi Hukari

Amoral chronology
Fallen Leaves & Dead Sparrows (2014)	In Sequence (2016)

Singles from In Sequence
- 1. "Rude Awakening" Released: December 6, 2005

Professional ratings
Review scores
Source	Rating
Metal Temple	7/10
Metal.de	7/10

In Sequence is the seventh studio album by Finnish metal band Amoral. It was released by Imperial Cassette in Finland on February 5, 2016. It is their last album before their 7-year split-up starting from 2017. A music video was released for the single "Rude Awakening".

== Track listing ==
All tracks are written by Ben Varon.

No.	Title	Length
1.	"In Sequence (Prologue)"	5:52
2.	"Rude Awakening"	6:06
3.	"The Betrayal"	7:21
4.	"Sounds of Home"	4:10
5.	"The Next One to Go"	7:06
6.	"Helping Hands"	6:42
7.	"Defuse the Past"	7:39
8.	"From the Beginning (The Note Part 2)"	10:44

Japanese edition bonus tracks
No.	Title	Length
9.	"All I Want" (The Offspring cover)	1:57
10.	"The Next One to Go (edit)"	5:07

== Personnel ==
- Ari Koivunen - clean vocals
- Niko Kalliojärvi - guitars, harsh vocals
- Ben Varon - guitars, backing vocals
- Masi Hukari - guitars, keyboards
- Pekka Johansson - bass
- Juhana Karlsson - drums
