= Ari Koivunen =

Finnish singer

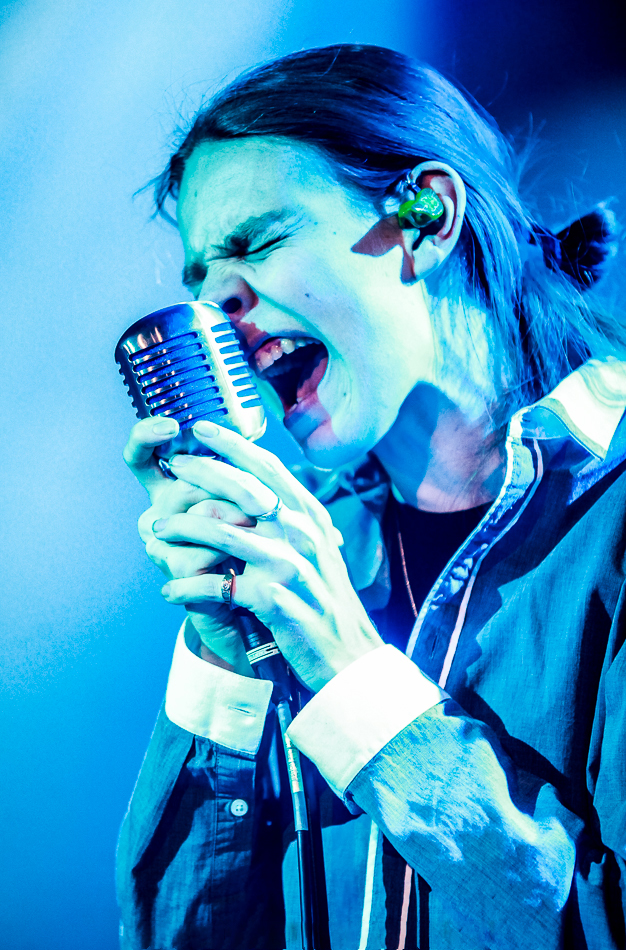
- Koivunen in 2014

Background information
- Born: Ari Mikael Koivunen; 7 June 1984 (age 42); Kouvola, Finland
- Genres: Hard rock, heavy metal, progressive metal, power metal
- Occupation: Singer
- Years active: 2007–present
- Label: Sony BMG (Ari Koivunen) Imperial Cassette (Amoral)
- Formerly of: Amoral
- Website: Ari Koivunen on Facebook

Ari Koivunen (born 7 June 1984) is a Finnish heavy metal singer who rose to fame as the winner of the Finnish singing competition Idols in 2007. He was the vocalist of the Finnish heavy metal band Amoral from 2008 to 2017. Beside he has worked with many musical projects already before and also after Amoral disbanded.

== Early life ==
Ari Koivunen was born in Kouvola on 7 June 1984 and developed an early interest in music. In 2005, he won the Finnish Karaoke Championships, and was placed third in the Karaoke World Championships the same year. The win of the Finnish "Idols" competition was his breakthrough in 2007. Unlike usual the pop music that dominated the show, he chose to perform mainly metal and rock songs in the contest.

== Career ==
=== Ari Koivunen band (2007–2009) ===
Ari Koivunen's debut album, Fuel for the Fire, was officially released on 30 May 2007, although the album had already been released for download on 21 May. The songs for the album were written by a number of Finnish metal musicians and songwriters such as Janne Joutsenniemi (SubUrban Tribe, Stone), Jarkko Ahola (Teräsbetoni), Marko Hietala (Nightwish, Tarot), Timo Tolkki (Stratovarius) and Tony Kakko (Sonata Arctica), among others. The album was recorded with Tuomas Wäinölä (Kotipelto, Nylon Beat), Mikko Kosonen (Maija Vilkkumaa), Nino Laurenne (Thunderstone), Mirka Rantanen (Thunderstone), Mikko Kaakuriniemi (Kotipelto), Pasi Heikkilä (45 Degree Woman) and Janne Wirman (Children of Bodom). The first single, Hear My Call, was released on 11 May 2007. The video for the song was directed and produced by Jaakko Manninen & Kusti Manninen.

During the first week of sales Fuel for the Fire jumped immediately to the top of the official album chart, and by 7 June 2007 it had already achieved platinum status with over 40,000 albums sold. Koivunen's album was one of the fastest selling records in Finnish music history, with over 10,000 copies sold in the first week of sales. Fuel for the Fire remained the number one album in Finland for twelve weeks after its release. The album reached double-platinum status (60,000 units) in October 2007. Fuel for the Fire was released in Japan in October 2007.

"Ari Koivunen" band was put together in spring 2007 mainly from people Ari had known for a longer time. Their first concert together took place in May 2007. In the first year the group played over 100 gigs.

On 11 June 2008, Ari Koivunen (the band) published the second album Becoming. The album was once again produced by Nino Laurenne and Pasi Heikkilä. The major part of the songs were made for this album by Ari Koivunen band. Luca Gargano (guitar) and Mauro Gargano (drums) were part of the band from the beginning until 2008 and also participated the recording session of Becoming. Becoming debuted at No. 1 on the Finnish album chart and received gold status (over 15 000 copies sold) after only one week's sales. "Becoming" was released in Japan on 25 June and in Germany on 10 October 2008. Ari Koivunen played about 160 gigs in Finland during the years 2007–2008, and two gigs in Tokyo, Japan at the end of May 2008.

Ari Koivunen members

- Ari Koivunen – vocals
- Erkka Korhonen – guitar, backing vocals
- Vili Robert Ollila – keyboards
- Erkki Silvennoinen – bass, backing vocals

Former members:

- Luca Gargano – guitar, backing vocals (2007–2008)
- Mauro Gargano – drums (2007–2008)

=== Amoral (Ari 2008–2017) ===
Show Your Colors (2009)

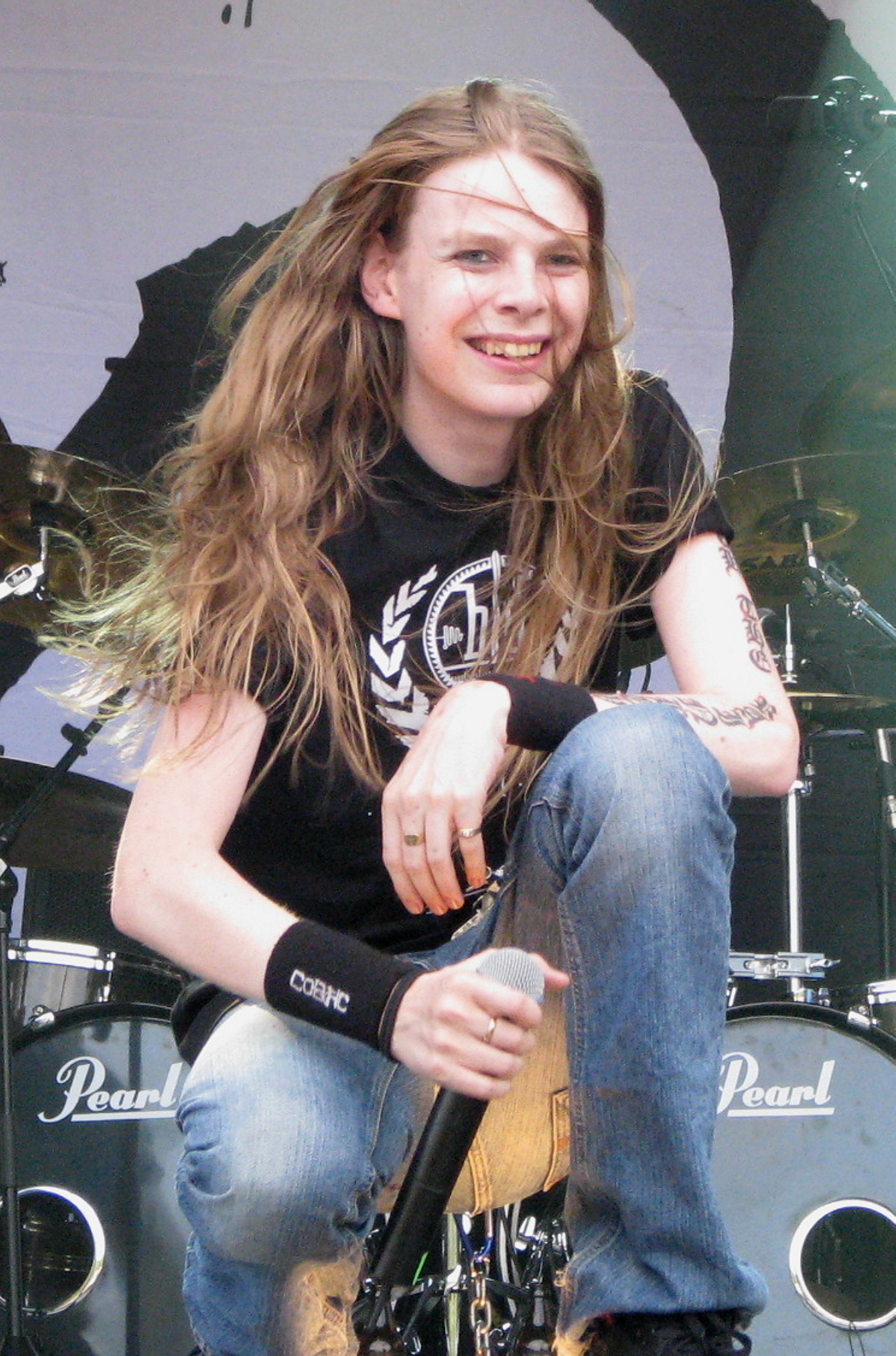
Koivunen in 2009

On 25 November 2008, metal band Amoral announced Ari as their lead vocalist. He made his vocal debut with Amoral in the studio album Show Your Colors on 6 May 2009. The album is the fourth official release in Amoral's history but the first one with Ari Koivunen as their vocalist. "Show Your Colors" reached Finland's chart-position No. 19 in the first week. There are two singles released of the album – Year of the Suckerpunch and Gave Up Easy.

Beneath (2011–2012)

Amoral's second album Beneath with Ari was released 26 October 2011. The Japan edition was out 19 October 2011. The first single was "Same Difference" and the second single, and the first video, was "Silhouette". Silhouette has both electric and acoustic versions, from which the acoustic one is the original. The second video was made from the punk rock oriented track "Wrapped in Barbwire", which pays obeisance to Guns N' Roses video "Garden of Eden". On 14 February 2012, Beneath was released in the US via The End Records and in Mexico it was published 15 February. In Russia it was out 27 March 2012 via Fono Records. The album was ranked by public voting as the fourth best domestic metal album at the Finnish Metal Awards 2011. and Ari as the fourth-best vocalist.

Fallen Leaves & Dead Sparrows (2014)

Amoral's sixth album, third with Ari, Fallen Leaves & Dead Sparrows was released in Finland on 14 February 2014 and as digital all over the world. In Europe the album was released on March. The album was produced by Ben Varon. Marko Hietala produced the vocals of Ari. The music is more progressive than ever on Amoral's albums and it has more metallic touch as their two previous albums. The album has received predominantly very positive reviews from metal magazines and webzines around Finland, Europe and the US. The band has been praised for their instrumental and vocal skills and liberated versatile music. "Fallen Leaves & Dead Sparrows" reached Finland's chart-position No. 18 in the first week and stayed on charts for two weeks. The first video Blueprints was published in March 2014. The second video Prolong a Stay was released 29 August 2014. In January 2015 Amoral released The Cure cover Burn.

In Sequence (2016)

In February 2015 Amoral started recording their seventh album In Sequence, which will be released global 5 February 2016 and in Japan 29 January 2016. The album continues the progressive metal style of "Fallen Leaves & Dead sparrows" but heavier. Beside the six members there are also some quest musicians featuring in the album, as percussionist Teho Majamäki, Indica singer Jonsu and Amine Benotmane from Acyl. The first single "Rude Awakening" was published in December 2015 on YouTube, and the second single "The Next One to Go" in January 2016. In an interview with German metal website Negatief.de, Ben Varon spoke about the album's concept:

"...in general we wanted to keep the focus on clean vocals, even though Niko is back in the band. I think the melodic side of Amoral is such a big part of us nowadays. I didn't wanna go all the way back to growling. Niko's vocals are more a special effect that we use when it's necessary and brings that "extra something" to the song. Then again Niko also came back as a guitar player... The album is obviously heavier because of Niko. Ari sings super clean. There is no rock'n'roll in his sound on the new album. Niko does all the aggressive parts and when Ari comes in its really smooth and deep."

Touring with Amoral

Ari Koivunen has toured with Amoral in Finland and in Europe from 2009 on. Ari debuted with Amoral in the US at SXSW event and in China in spring 2012. The band performed also in Japan at the same tour. Ari was touring second time in Europe with Amoral in autumn 2012, when Amoral supported Ensiferum at the "Bearers of the Swords 2012" tour. The band toured in Asia in April–May 2013, playing at Pulp Summer Slam festival in the Philippines and at the Peking and Shanghai Midi Festivals in China. The festival in Peking was the biggest one in the band's history with an audience of 10 000 people. They toured in Europe again in November 2014 with Swedish metal band Dark Tranquillity.

The band had the In Sequence tour in Finland in spring 2016. Ari Koivunen did not sing on the "Old School Tour" of the band in Finland in autumn 2016, as the band only played the three first albums with original singer Niko Kalliojärvi. Ari's last performance in Amoral took place on 5 January 2017 at the final show of Amoral in Helsinki, Finland.

Disbandment

27 July 2016 the band announced, signed by all the current members, that they will disband in the beginning of 2017: "It is with heavy hearts that we announce that we've decided to disband Amoral. This was not an easy decision, as this band has been such a huge part of our lives (in the case of Ben and Juhana, for about 19 years!), but yet it felt like it was time. Constantly conflicting schedules and a fading interest in touring by some members have made the band run at half-speed. Amoral is not a "half-speed" band. It's all or nothing. And, to be honest, the idea of starting something brand new after all this time has become very appealing...."

=== Other projects ===
Beside Amoral, Ari has played also solo and duo shows among others with his previous bandmates, Erkka Korhonen and Luca Gargano.

Ari has joined the Raskasta Joulua (Heavy Christmas) – tour in Finland each year since 2007 (except 2017 for vocal cord infection) with a group of well known Finnish metal vocalists. They perform traditional and contemporary Christmas songs in heavy rock/metal style. From 2013 on the tour has been played in big concert halls, when they earlier performed mainly in clubs. Ari sings in four Heavy Christmas albums: "Raskasta Joulua"(2013), "Raskasta joulua 2" (2014), "Tulkoon joulu – akustisesti" (2015) and "Raskasta joulua IV". The two first albums have sold Platinum (over 20,000 units) in Finland. Ari sings in the first album a traditional Finnish Christmas song Arkihuolesi kaikki heitä, in the second album "The First Noel" and in the acoustic album Sylvian Joululaulu and in the fourth album "Kun joulu on". The two first albums and the fourth album contain also a song where all the singers sing together, on the 1st one Tulkoon joulu, on the second one Joulu, juhla parahin and on the fourth they sing "Joulun rauhaa".

2015 Ari started to perform at the Music Theater Palatsi in Tampere, Finland. The theatre changed its name to Finnish Music Theatre, Suomen musiikkiteatteri in 2017. Their first play with Ari was the rock musical I Wanna Rock in 2015, where he plays the roles of Michael Monroe, Axl Rose and Steve Perry. He went on playing in the theater also 2016 in a musical called Autiotalossa where he plays the name role of the legendary Finnish rock musician Neumann from the band Dingo in the 80s. In winter 2017 there was a premiere of We Rock! Heavyrock Night, where Ari and 5 other singers sing legendary heavy metal songs. In autumn 2017, there was a premiere of the Finnish 70s retro rock musical Raparperitaivas, where Ari plays one of the main roles.

In 2017 Ari founded together with Marko Hietala and JP Leppäluoto a new group called Powerless Trio. They toured in concert halls in Finland in January and February 2018. Beside singing, Ari also plays drums. The trio plays their own favorite classic metal and rock covers and are also entertaining the audience by telling personal stories related to the songs.

== Discography ==
=== Albums ===
Year	Information	Finland	Sales and certifications
2007	Fuel for the Fire: First studio album; Released: 30 May 2007; Label: Sony BMG; Format: CD, Download	1	Finnish sales: 69,149 IFPI: 2xPlatinum
2008	Becoming: Second studio album; Released: 11 June 2008; Label: Sony BMG; Format: CD, Download	1	Finnish sales: 17,344 IFPI: Gold
2009	Show Your Colors by Amoral: Third studio album; Released: 6 May 2009; Label: Spinefarm; Format: CD, Download	19	Finnish sales:
2011	Beneath by Amoral: Fourth studio album; Released: 2011; Label: Imperial Cassette; Format: CD, Download	30	Finnish sales:
2014	Fallen Leaves & Dead Sparrows by Amoral: Fifth studio album; Released: 2014; Label: Imperial Cassette; Format: CD, Vinyl, Download	18	Finnish sales:
2016	In Sequence by Amoral: Sixth studio album; Released: 2016; Label: Imperial Cassette; Format: CD, Download	29	Finnish sales:

=== Singles ===
- Song for the Idols winner / On the Top of the World (6 April 2007)
- Fuel for the Fire / Hear My Call (28 May 2007)
- Fuel for the Fire / Fuel for the Fire (27 August 2007)
- Fuel for the Fire / Angels Are Calling (2007)
- Becoming / Give Me a Reason (5 May 2008)
- Becoming / Tears Keep Falling (2008)
- Show Your Colors / Year of the Suckerpunch (2009)
- Show Your Colors / Gave Up Easy (2009)
- Beneath / Same Difference (2011)
- Beneath / Silhouette (2011)
- Fallen Leaves & Dead Sparrows / If Not Here, Where? (2013)
- Fallen Leaves & Dead Sparrows / No Familiar Faces (2014)
- In Sequence / Rude Awakening (2015)
- In Sequence / The Next One to Go (2016)

== Idols ==
=== Idols 2007 ===
In late 2006, Koivunen auditioned for the third season of the Finnish singing competition Idols, which had had a prolonged break since 2005's second series. Prior to auditioning, he had been working as a bartender. His strong and very distinctive voice impressed the panel of judges (Asko Kallonen, Nina Tapio and Jone Nikula) and he was passed through to the next round of the competition. He was then granted a place in the semi-finals, which would allow the public to decide which contestants would make it into the live final rounds. In his semi-final round, Koivunen received a massive public vote of 86%, thereby allowing him to breeze through to the live finals.

==== Idols performances ====
- Audition: "FullMoon" by Sonata Arctica
- Semi-Finals: "Piano Man" by Billy Joel
- Top 7 Birth Year: "Perfect Strangers" by Deep Purple
- Top 6 Dedications: "The Evil That Men Do" by Iron Maiden
- Top 5 Kings and Queens: "Here I Go Again" by Whitesnake
- Top 4 My Idols: "Rock and Roll" by Led Zeppelin
- Top 4 My Idols: "Hunting High and Low" by Stratovarius
- Top 3 Finnish Hits: "You Break My Heart" by Broadcast
- Top 3 Finnish Hits: "Sielut Iskee Tulta" by Kilpi
- Top 2 Grand Final: "FullMoon" by Sonata Arctica
- Top 2 Grand Final: "Black Hole Sun" by Soundgarden
- Top 2 Grand Final: "Still Loving You" by Scorpions
- Top 2 Grand Final: "On Top of the World" by Ari Koivunen – Declared 3rd Finnish Idol

A resident of Lahti, Koivunen breezed into the finals after winning 86% of the public vote for his rendition of Billy Joel's Piano Man. On the first of March 2007, Koivunen reserved himself a place in the second round of competition with his version of Deep Purple's Perfect Strangers.

Koivunen moved into the third round of competition on 8 March with his performance of the Iron Maiden classic The Evil That Men Do.

On 15 March, Koivunen made it into the fourth round of competition, singing the Whitesnake hit, Here I Go Again. Despite some criticism from the judges for singing only heavy metal songs in the finals, Koivunen was unperturbed. "I don't see any reason to consider what people might like, since it seems they like the same thing I do," said Koivunen. At the end of the evening, Koivunen, the six other Idols finalists, and three of the semifinalists were presented with gold records for their album Idols 2007, which sold over 15,000 copies in the two days after its release.

The fourth Idols final was held on 22 March, and Koivunen chose to sing, in keeping with the week's theme, two songs by his own idols, the Led Zeppelin hit Rock and Roll and Hunting High and Low by the Finnish metal band Stratovarius. The judges, however, were not pleased with Koivunen's continuance of the heavy metal line, and gave him an unprecedented four negative reviews. The voting public was of a different opinion, as Koivunen again made it into the next round without being in danger of elimination.

The fifth Idols final was held on 29 March, and Koivunen won over the judges completely with his version of the Broadcast ballad You Break My Heart. For his second song, Koivunen sang the Finnish hit Sielut iskee tulta by the heavy metal band Kilpi. With these performances, Koivunen made it to the Idols final which was held on 6 April 2007 in the Helsinki Ice Hall, where he defeated his fellow competitor Anna Abreu by gaining 57% of the public vote. Koivunen sang the Sonata Arctica song FullMoon (which he also sang in the auditions), the Soundgarden hit Black Hole Sun (chosen by the judges), the Scorpions ballad Still Loving You and the song On the Top of the World which was composed for the Idols winner.

As his reward for winning Idols 2007, Koivunen received a recording contract with Sony BMG, and an advance payment of 30,000 Euros. His first solo single was On Top of the World, the song composed for the Idols winner. He had already sung with the other Idols finalists on the single "Pop-musiikkia".
