= Breedgreedbreed =

BreedGreedBreed

Studio album by Misery Inc.
- Released: October 10th, 2007
- Recorded: May – July 2007
- Studios: Soundtrack Recording Studio & Monttu's
- Genre: Groove metal
- Length: 49:38
- Label: Megamania
- Producer: Mikko Herranen

Breedgreedbreed is the third album from Finnish metal band Misery Inc., released by Finnish record label Johanna Kustannus (Megamania) on October 10, 2007. The album was recorded at Soundtrack Recording Studio & Monttu's by Mikko Herranen during May–July 2007. Album was mixed & produced by Mikko Herranen. Mastered by Svante Forsbäck at Chartmakers Oy.

== Track listing ==
1. "Cheap Clone"
2. "Blinded by Power"
3. "Devil's Advocate"
4. "Ticket But No Ride"
5. "Fall Of The Idol"
6. "Prodigal Son"
7. "Modern Day Human Waste"
8. "Obsession"
9. "New World Messiah"
10. "After You"
11. "Candyman"
12. "They All Will Get What They Deserve"

Music by Tolonen, Ylämäki, Kauppinen

Lyrics by Tolonen, Mankinen
