= Amoral =

Amoral may refer to:

- Amorality, the absence of morality; for example, a stone, a chair, or the sky may be considered amoral
- Moral nihilism, the belief that the notion of morality is meaningless
- Amoral (band), Finnish metal band
