= Oceanhoarse =

Finnish heavy metal band

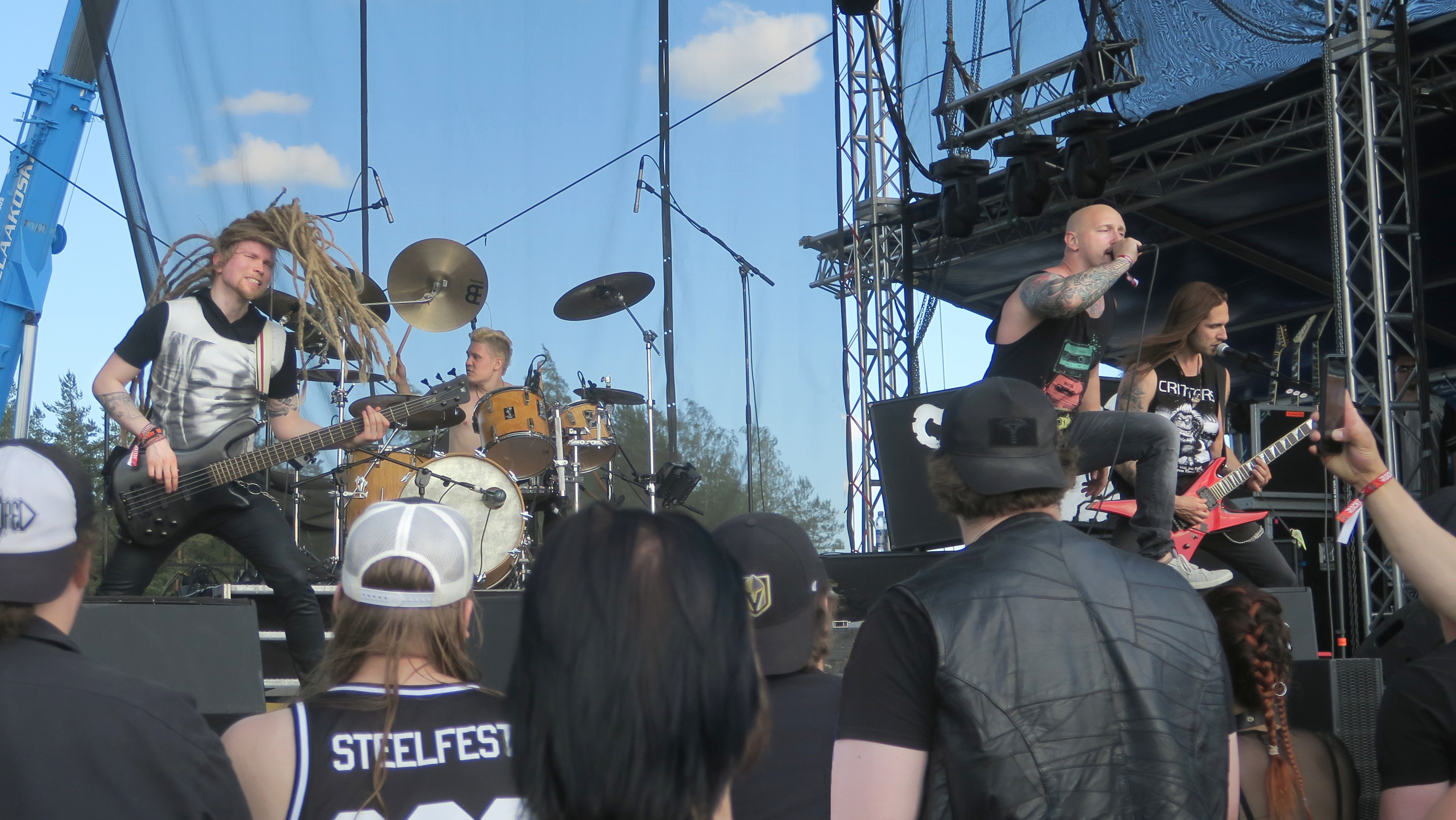
- Oceanhoarse at Rockfest in Finland, 2019

Background information
- Origin: Helsinki, Finland
- Genres: Alternative metal; metalcore; groove metal
- Years active: 2018–2024
- Label: Noble Demon Records
- Members: Ben Varon; Joonas Kosonen; Jyri Helko; Oskari Niemi
- Website: facebook.com/oceanhoarse

Oceanhoarse was a Finnish heavy metal band formed in 2018. They released three full-length albums, with their debut, The Damage Is Done - Live!, being released in 2020. They disbanded in 2024.

== History ==
The band was founded by Ben Varon, ex-Amoral guitarist and songwriter, who after ending Amoral at the beginning of 2017, wanted to start a brand new band. Other members who joined Oceanhoarse were bassist Jyri Helko (For the Imperium, Warmen), singer Tommy Tuovinen (MyGrain), and drummer Oskari Niemi.

The band released their debut single, "The Oceanhoarse", on Finnish Radio Rock online radio 17 January 2018, and the video the following day. Their second single, "Fading Neons", was released as a live version on 22 February 2018, on the metal music website BraveWords. The third single, "Waves", was released on 17 April and the video on 7 May. "The Oceanhoarse" and "Fading Neons" can be heard as part of the soundtrack on the Wreckfest racing video game.

By July 2018, Oceanhoarse had played 13 shows and 11 own songs: Two anonymous songs, the three singles, "Feed the Sirens", "Death Row Center", "From Hell to Oblivion", "Intruder", "Born of Fire", and "Bark at the Moon". The shows were generally well received.

On 28 August 2018, it was announced vocalist Tommy Touvinen was forced to leave the band due to hearing loss. Joonas Kosonen was announced as his replacement on 30 October.

The fifth single, "Death Row Center", was Joonas Kosonen's debut in Oceanhoarse. It was released in February 2019. The sixth single "Feed the Sirens" was released in June 2019. In late 2019, the band worked on their first album. The Voluntary Bends EP was released on 15 November 2019. Before that, the band released the Slipknot cover song "Duality" from the EP. Other songs on the album include "Death Row Center" and "Feed the Sirens", as well as new songs "Stitches" and "Maze of Death".

In 2019, Oceanhoarse performed at clubs and festivals, including the Tokyo Finland Feast in Japan and the Hyvinkää Rockfest in Finland. The band's year culminated in its own Hoarsefest event at On the Rocks club in Helsinki, where in addition to the performance of five metal bands, there was also other programs such as music clinics. In February 2020, the band were on their first European tour as a warm-up for Marko Hietala, before the corona pandemic restrictions came into force. Part of the band's spring and summer 2020 performances were cancelled due to restrictions, including the Tuska Open Air in Helsinki at the end of June.

The band's goal is to make catchy live music. According to the band, this way of making music also allows the songs to be tested in front of the audience before they are recorded. As a consistent continuation to this line, the band released their first full-length album as a live recording. The songs were recorded in February 2020 on the band's first European tour. The first single "The Damage (Live)" was clipped from the album in May 2020. The Damage Is Done - Live! album was released on 5 June 2020. The album includes both songs released on the Voluntary Bends EP and previously released singles, as well as bass and guitar solos that are an essential part of live gigs. Kimmo Ahola, FOH engineer at Nightwish, is responsible for the recording and Tuomas Wäinölä for the mixing of the album.

On 31 July 2024, the group announced their disbandment, stating it was "time for new things".

== Musical style ==
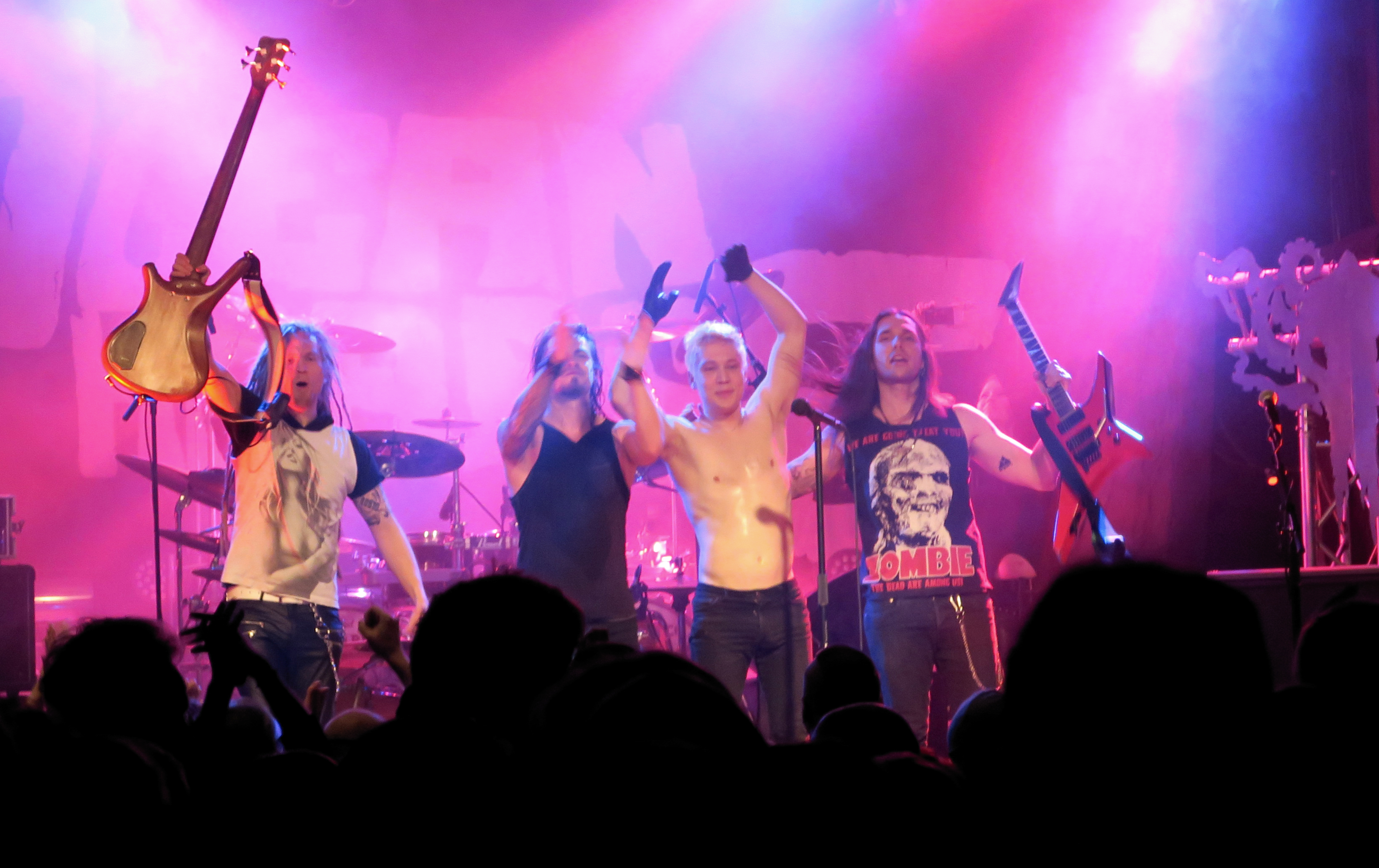
Oceanhoarse performing in 2018

Dominik Rothe of metal.de, in a review of the album Dead Reckoning, said that even though the band describes themselves as heavy metal, their style is "in fact [...] a mix of metalcore and 90s groove metal", comparing them to Machine Head and Killswitch Engage. The song's choruses were noted as radio-friendly and catchy. The band alternates between shouting and clean singing. Unlike Amoral, Oceanhoarse uses no backgrounds or synthesizers in their music. The emphasis is on live-oriented metal.

== Personnel ==
Current members

- Ben Varon – guitars (2018–2024)
- Jyri Helko – bass (2018–2024)
- Oskari Niemi – drums (2018–2024)
- Joonas Kosonen – vocals (2018–2024)

Former members

- Tommy Tuovinen – vocals (2018)

== Discography ==
EPs

- Voluntary Bends (15 November 2019)

Albums

- The Damage Is Done - Live! (5 June 2020)
- Dead Reckoning (20 August 2021)
- Heads Will Roll (17 February 2023)

Singles

- "The Oceanhoarse" (January 2018)
- "Fading Neons" (February 2018)
- "Waves" (April 2018)
- "The Intruder" (July 2018)
- "Death Row Center" (February 2019)
- "Feed the Sirens" (June 2019)
- "Duality" (November 2019, Slipknot cover)
- "Maze of Death" (December 2019)
- "The Damage (Live)" (May 2020)
- "Locks" (September 2020)
- "<<REW" (November 2020)
- "One with the Gun" (February 2021)
- "Reaching Skywards" (May 2021)
- "Only" (December 2021, Anthrax cover)
- "Fading Neons" (March 2022)
- "Heads Will Roll" (May 2022)
- "Nails" (August 2022)
- "Help Is on the Way" (October 2022)
- "Pryopen" (November 2022)
- "Carved in Stone" (December 2022)
- "Brick" (January 2023)
