= Metal Mass =

Worship service featuring heavy metal music

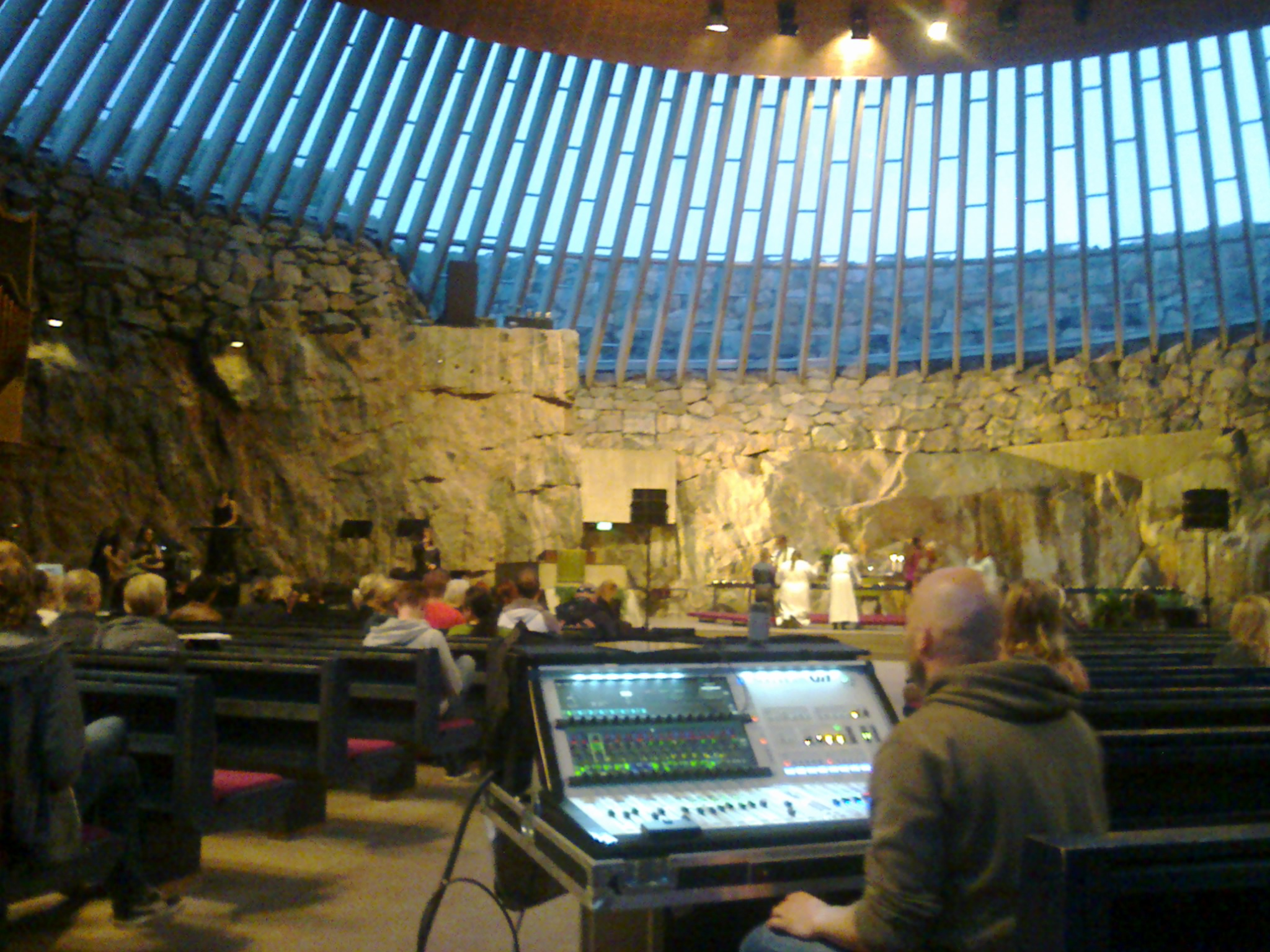
Metal Mass in Temppeliaukio Church, 2014.

Metal Mass (in Finnish, Metallimessu) is a heavy metal music service of worship. In it the traditional hymns are adapted to heavy metal style, following the Order of Mass of the Lutheran Churches. As reported by The Washington Times and AFP, it has become a popular phenomenon in Finland, drawing hundreds of people, especially youth, to church, since it was first held in 2006. An album based on the service, Metallimessu, peaked at number 12 on the Finnish album chart, and has been on the Top 40 Chart for three weeks. Several known Finnish heavy metal musicians have participated on the musical side of the Mass and the album.

== History ==
The concept of Metal Mass was thought up by five metal fans, three of whom worked at a church (pastors Haka Kekäläinen and Jukka Valkama and youth worker Mikko Saari) and the other two being musicians (Markus Korri and Juhani Palttala), after a 2005 seminar on the relationship of Church and heavy metal music. They gathered a team for service and began working on arrangements. The first Metal Mass was held around the time of the annual Tuska Open Air Metal Festival, June 29, 2006, in Temppeliaukio Church. Taage Laiho of the hard rock band Kilpi, was the lead singer in that Metal Mass. The service was reportedly a success, with 300 people being left out because of safety reasons.

The team founded an organization for the service, Metallimessu ry, and between 2007 and 2008 the Metal Mass was held in several major cities in Finland with different workgroup line-ups. The service drew hundreds of people each time.

On August 26, 2008, the Metallimessu album was released, and the songs and interludes follow the pattern of the service. On the album, guest vocalists for the hymns include Taage Laiho (Kilpi), Ville Tuomi (Suburban Tribe), Tanja (Lullacry), Tuomas Nieminen (Adamantra), Juhani Muhonen (Sorrowind) and Heikki Pöyhiä (Twilightning).

== Phenomenon ==
According to AFP, the popularity of the Metal Mass is linked to the mainstream popularity of heavy metal music in Finland. "If it has a niche audience elsewhere, heavy metal is now mainstream in Finland. Helsinki alone abounds with heavy metal karaoke bars, dedicated metal clubs and regular gigs, adding to the dozens of summertime heavy metal festivals held around the Nordic country."

Mikko Saari, a co-founder of Metallimessu, tells AFP that "Finns are known to be reserved, serious and very honest ... Somehow heavy metal fits into this as it is no-nonsense, honest, straightforward and quite gloomy."

== Reception ==
The Finnish Christian Media Association awarded Metal Mass the "Christian Media Achievement of 2007" title, writing that "Metal Mass as a concept and service of worship has remarkably widened Finland's Lutheran church's boundaries for the current and future members of its parishes." The concept has drawn interest and media coverage from Sweden and Norway as well.

750 people attended the first Metal Mass, and the after that the popularity has been solid, for example, at the service held at Mäntsälä, 1100 people attended Metal Mass. Not all accept the idea of Metal Mass, according to Saari, "Of course some Christian circles were scared and some true metal people were irate. But many said that the idea was great and that they had been waiting for it."
