= Becoming (Ari Koivunen album) =

Studio album by Ari Koivunen
- Released: June 11, 2008
- Genre: Hard rock; power metal
- Length: 52:32
- Label: Sony BMG
- Producer: Nino Laurenne; Pasi Heikkilä

Ari Koivunen chronology
Fuel for the Fire (2007)	Becoming (2008)

Becoming is the second album by Ari Koivunen, who won the 2007 Finnish Idols competition. The thirteenth and final track on the album is an acoustic version of "The Evil That Men Do". The song is a cover song from the British heavy metal band Iron Maiden. Ari previously performed the song during the 2007 Finnish Idols competition, but the album version is an acoustic arrangement and has a slightly altered organization of the lyrics.

== Track listing ==
No.	Title	Lyrics	Music	Length
1.	"Raging Machine"	Nino Laurenne & Pasi Heikkilä	Nino Laurenne & Pasi Heikkilä	4:33
2.	"Under the Burning Sky"	Vili Ollila	Ari Koivunen Band	5:48
3.	"Give Me a Reason"	Nino Laurenne & Pasi Heikkilä	Nino Laurenne & Pasi Heikkilä	3:49
4.	"Sign of our Times"	Luca Gargano	Ari Koivunen Band	4:33
5.	"Sweet Madness"	Maija Kalaoja & Pasi Heikkilä	Pasi Heikkilä	5:36
6.	"Father"	Luca Gargano, Ari Koivunen, Erkka Korhonen & Erkki Silvennoinen	Ari Koivunen Band	5:52
7.	"Keepers of the Night"	Luca Gargano & Laura Reunanen	Ari Koivunen Band	4:45
8.	"Tears Keep Falling"	Vili Ollila	Ari Koivunen Band	4:47
9.	"Hero's Gold"	Luca Gargano	Ari Koivunen Band	3:56
10.	"My Mistake"	Rauli Eskolin & Erno Laitinen	Rauli Eskolin & Erno Laitinen	4:18
11.	"Unscarred Within"	Mikko Salovaara	Mikko Salovaara	4:18

Bonus
No.	Title	Lyrics	Music	Length
12.	"Fight Forever" (For Japan Only)	Vili Ollila	Vili Ollila	4:05
13.	"The Evil That Men Do" (Hidden Track)	Bruce Dickinson, Steve Harris & Adrian Smith	Bruce Dickinson, Steve Harris & Adrian Smith	3:24

== Personnel ==
- Ari Koivunen – vocals
- Erkka Korhonen – guitar
- Erkki Silvennoinen – bass
- Mauro Gargano – drums
- Vili Ollila – keyboards
- Luca Gargano - guitar
