= Fuel for the Fire (Ari Koivunen album) =

Studio album by Ari Koivunen
- Released: May 30, 2007
- Genre: Hard rock, power metal
- Length: 52:41
- Label: SonyBMG
- Producer: Nino Laurenne; Pasi Heikkilä

Ari Koivunen chronology
Fuel for the Fire (2007)	Becoming (2008)

Fuel for the Fire is the first album by Ari Koivunen, the winner of the 2007 Finnish Idols competition. Among the metal artists who have contributed material to the album are Timo Tolkki (ex Stratovarius, Revolution Renaissance), Marko Hietala (Nightwish, Tarot, Northern Kings), Janne Joutsenniemi (Suburban Tribe), Tony Kakko (Sonata Arctica, Northern Kings) and Jarkko Ahola (Teräsbetoni, Northern Kings).

== Track listing ==
(Standard Edition)
No.	Title	Lyrics	Music	Length
1.	"God Of War"	Kimmo Blom	Tuomas Heikkinen	3:58
2.	"Hear My Call"	Nino Laurenne & Pasi Heikkilä	Nino Laurenne & Pasi Heikkilä	4:20
3.	"Fuel For The Fire"	Janne Joutsenniemi	Janne Joutsenniemi	3:52
4.	"Don't Try To Break Me"	Maija Kalaoja	Pasi Heikkilä	4:14
5.	"Angels Are Calling"	Timo Tolkki	Timo Tolkki	5:09
6.	"I Fly"	Nino Laurenne	Nino Laurenne	5:01
7.	"Our Beast"	Marko Hietala	Marko Hietala	5:18
8.	"Losing My Insanity"	Tony Kakko	Tony Kakko	3:45
9.	"Stay True"	Jarkko Ahola	Jarkko Ahola	4:25
10.	"Stormwind"	Kyösti Salokorpi	Pessi Levanto	5:20
11.	"Heartstealer"	Kimmo Blom & Tuomas Heikkinen	Tuomas Heikkinen	3:37

Bonus I
No.	Title	Lyrics	Music	Length
12.	"Hetki Lyö"	Pertti Reponen (Finnish lyrics)	Richard Gottehrer & Jonathan Stroll	3:24
13.	"Piano Man"	Billy Joel	Billy Joel	4:38
14.	"On The Top Of The World" (Radio Edit)	Jörgen Elofsson, Maki Kolehmainen & Tracy Lipp	Jörgen Elofsson, Maki Kolehmainen & Tracy Lipp	3:34

Bonus II (For Japan Only)
No.	Title	Lyrics	Music	Length
15.	"Don't Try To Break Me" (live)	Maija Kalaoja	Pasi Heikkilä	4:23
16.	"Angels Are Calling" (live)	Timo Tolkki	Timo Tolkki	5:42

(Double Platinum Edition)
No.	Title	Lyrics	Music	Length
1.	"God Of War"	Kimmo Blom	Tuomas Heikkinen	3:57
2.	"Hear My Call"	Nino Laurenne & Pasi Heikkilä	Nino Laurenne & Pasi Heikkilä	4:20
3.	"Fuel For The Fire"	Janne Joutsenniemi	Janne Joutsenniemi	3:52
4.	"Don't Try To Break Me"	Maija Kalaoja	Pasi Heikkilä	4:14
5.	"Angels Are Calling"	Timo Tolkki	Timo Tolkki	5:09
6.	"I Fly"	Nino Laurenne	Nino Laurenne	5:01
7.	"Our Beast"	Marko Hietala	Marko Hietala	5:18
8.	"Losing My Insanity"	Tony Kakko	Tony Kakko	3:45
9.	"Stay True"	Jarkko Ahola	Jarkko Ahola	4:25
10.	"Stormwind"	Kyösti Salokorpi	Pessi Levanto	5:20
11.	"Heartstealer"	Kimmo Blom & Tuomas Heikkinen	Tuomas Heikkinen	3:37
12.	"Hetki Lyö"	Pertti Reponen (Finnish lyrics)	Richard Gottehrer & Jonathan Stroll	3:24
13.	"Angels Are Calling" (Acoustic Radio Edit)	Timo Tolkki	Timo Tolkki	4:33
14.	"Hear My Call" (Acoustic Radio Edit)	Nino Laurenne & Pasi Heikkilä	Nino Laurenne & Pasi Heikkilä	4:43

== Personnel ==
- Ari Koivunen – vocals
- Tuomas Wäinölä – lead guitar
- Pasi Heikkilä – bass
- Mirka Rantanen – drums
- Janne Wirman – keyboards
- Nino Laurenne - rhythm guitar
