= Kaaoksen Kuningas =

Studio album by Kilpi
- Released: February 8, 2006
- Genre: Hard rock
- Length: 47:21

Kilpi chronology
II Taso (2004)	Kaaoksen Kuningas (2006)

Kaaoksen Kuningas is the third album from the Finnish hard rock band Kilpi.

== Track listing ==
1. "Laske Kuolleet Ja Rukoile" – 4:44
2. "Kahdeksas Ihme" – 4:45
3. "Ihminen" – 4:17
4. "Yhtä ihoa" – 4:46
5. "Velka" – 4:08
6. "Toinen Minä" – 3:38
7. "Lihaa Ja Verta" – 3:57
8. "Katharsis" – 4:22
9. "Kuolleet Tunteet" – 4:57
10. "Kaaoksen Kuningas" – 7:42
