= Ben Varon =

Finnish guitarist

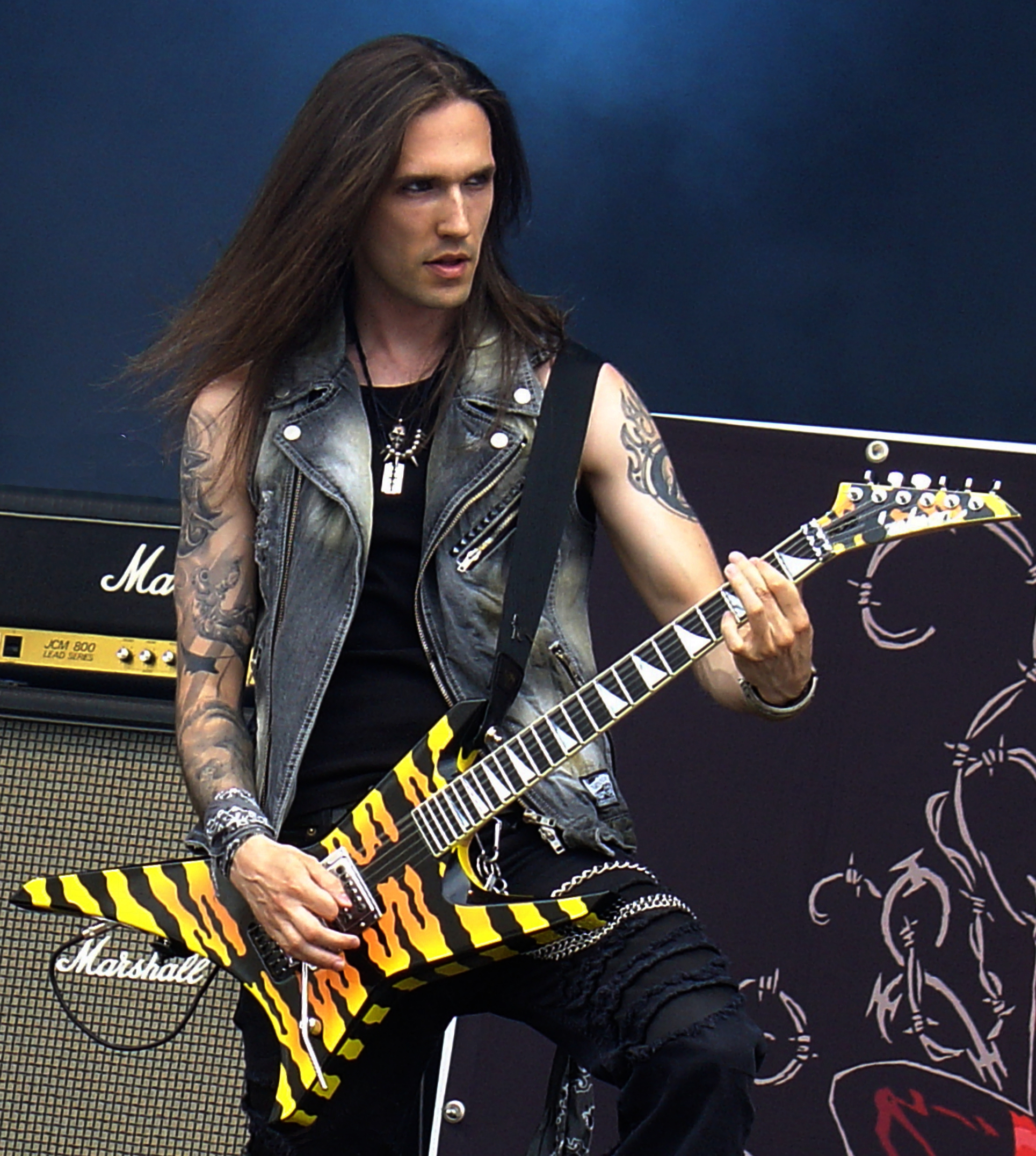
- Varon at Tuska Open Air 2012

Background information
- Born: 18 November 1983 (age 42)
- Origin: Helsinki, Finland
- Genres: Heavy metal
- Instrument: Guitar
- Years active: 1997–present
- Formerly of: Amoral, Oceanhoarse

Ben Varon (born 18 November 1983) is a Finnish guitarist. He is known as a member and one of the founders of the Finnish metal band Amoral that was active from 1997 to 2017. In the beginning of 2018, he founded a new heavy metal band, Oceanhoarse.

== Early life and influences ==
Varon started playing guitar when he was 11–12 years old. He had been begging for an electric guitar for about a year, and finally got a Strat copy as a birthday present from his parents. The first few years went by without much progress: He did take a few lessons to get started, but did not really practice much at all. Varon tells in his bio that it was only later when he understood, that if he wanted to go anywhere with his playing, he should start to work on it.

Varon is mostly self-taught, but he has taken some lessons over the years. First, when he got started to learn to tune the guitar and to form a power chord. Then, a few years later when he started actually to practice, he took lessons for a while at Pop & Jazz conservatory in Helsinki. Varon was taught also by Finnish guitarist Roope Latvala around 2001 about scales and modes, including some of Stone licks in which he was very interested at that time.

The biggest influence on Varon's music has been Slash, guitarist of Guns N' Roses, and Pantera guitarist Dimebag Darrell. Slash, with the pompous Use Your Illusion songs, blew Varon's mind up and was the reason for him to start to play guitar. A bit later on, Varon got into Pantera, but Darrell's playing affected him until now. Both the lead and rhythm work of Darrell greatly inspired him. Some other sources of inspiration include Nuno Bettencourt, Roope Latvala, Randy Rhoads and Zakk Wylde.

== Career ==
=== Amoral (1997–2017) ===
In 1997, at the age of 14, Varon started to play with Juhana Karlsson (drums), with whom he went to the same school. They started by jamming on a couple of Metallica songs. That was the first time Varon played together with another musician. They went jamming as often as possible. Silver Ots joined soon after. Amoral was founded 1997. The band played technical, progressive, melodic, hard rock-oriented metal. The band's fourth album was an about-turn, replacing the dominance of quirky death metal with an exemplary display of riff-driven, heavy, yet melodic power groove and the occasional sing-along chorus. Amoral performed extensively in bars, clubs, festivals and other venues in Finland, Europe, Japan, China, Philippines and the US. The band split up in 2017, after 20 years together.

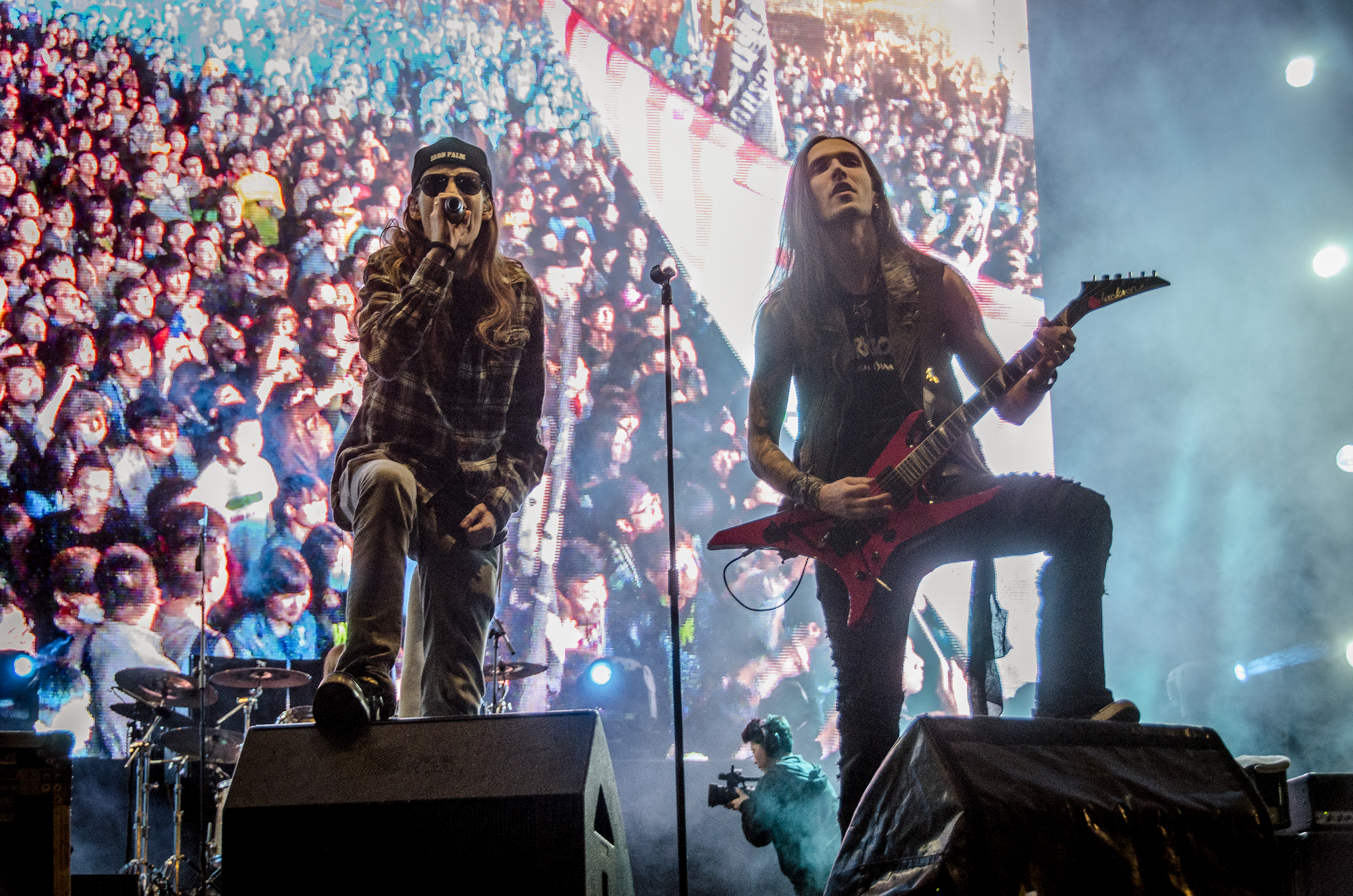
Varon (right) performing with Amoral in 2013

Varon has always been involved in the songwriting for Amoral's music. Whilst he contributed alongside Silver Ots on the first four albums, he took after the main responsibility of songwriting and was accompanied by guitarist Masi Hukari on the fifth and sixth albums. The music and lyrics for Amoral's last album In Sequence Varon wrote mainly alone. In Amoral's first years, Varon had contributed lyrics to a few songs for the band's music. After singer and main lyricists Niko Kalliojärvi's departure in 2008, Varon took over the main responsibility to write lyrics.

=== Oceanhoarse (2018–present) ===
In 2016, once Amoral's closing decision was made, Varon started with a new band from zero. After two years work with its music, in the beginning of 2018, the new heavy metal band Oceanhoarse was announced. Oceanhoarse has told they will not use any backgrounds or synthesizers in their music. The emphasis would be on live-oriented heavy metal. The other members beside Varon are Tommy Tuovinen (MyGrain) on vocals, Jyri Helko (For the Imperium, Warmen) on bass, and Oskari Niemi on drums. The debut single, "The Oceanhoarse", was played first time on Radio Rock on 17 January 2018 and the video was published a day later.

=== Alcyona Sky (2014–present) ===
In 2013, after ending Amoral's fifth album Fallen Leaves & Dead Sparrows, Varon went on composing the summer-long material that did not fit to Amoral's style (90s rock and acoustic-driven sound of the 70s). In 2014, he founded a new group, Alcyona Sky, to play this music. The other members beside Varon are Micko Hell (Denigrate, Million Dollar Beggars) on vocals, Rale Tiiainen (The Black League, The OHO, Ancara) on drums, and Jyri Helko on bass. Alcyona Sky has released one album, Alcyona Sky, in April 2017. The band later told that the album was released as a one-off project.

=== Other ===
From 2007, Varon played at Dimebag Beyond Forever tribute act. In 2011, he performed at Tornado's album Amsterdamn, Hellsinki. Varon also plays in Andy McCoy's band Grease Helmet, which was created 2012. Grease Helmet released one album in 2012. 2017 Varon joined to a new musical project, to play guitar in Panorama. Their first single was written by Varon.

In 2012, Japanese Young Guitar Magazine published 10 pages of Amoral's notes with Varon demonstrating them.

Varon was chosen at "Finnish Metal Awards" in 2009 6th, 2010 4th and 2011 5th best metal musician in Finland.

== Discography ==
Studio albums

- Wound Creations (Amoral 2004), Spinefarm
- Decrowning (Amoral 2005), Spinefarm
- Reptile Ride (Amoral 2007), Spinefarm
- Show Your Colors (Amoral 2009), Spinefarm
- Beneath (Amoral 2011), Imperial Cassette
- Fallen Leaves & Dead Sparrows (Amoral 2014), Imperial Cassette
- In Sequence (Amoral 2016), Imperial Cassette
- Alcyona Sky (Alcyona Sky 2017), Imperial Cassette
- "Dead Reckoning" (Oceanhoarse 2021), Noble Demon Records

Singles

- "Leave Your Dead Behind" (Amoral, 2007)
- "Year of the Suckerpunch" (Amoral, 2009)
- "Gave Up Easy" (Amoral, 2009)
- "Same Difference" (Amoral, 2011)
- "Silhouette" (Amoral, 2011)
- "If Not Here, Where?" (Amoral, 2013)
- "No Familiar Faces" (Amoral, 2014)
- "Rude Awakening" (Amoral, 2015)
- "The Next One to Go" (Amoral, 2016)
- "Around the World" (Panorama, 2017)
- "The Oceanhoarse" (Oceanhoarse, 2018)
