= Inherit the Void =

Studio album by Profane Omen
- Released: March 4, 2009
- Recorded: September–November 2008 at Petrax studio and Villvox Studio
- Genre: Groove metal
- Label: Metalheim/Playground
- Producer: Ville Sorvali and Profane Omen

Profane Omen chronology
| Disconnected EP (2007) | Inherit the Void (2009) |

Inherit The Void is the second album by Finnish metal band Profane Omen. It was recorded in September–November 2008 at Petrax and Villvox Studios by Aleksanteri Kuosa. The album was mixed at Villvox by Aleksanteri Kuosa and Williami Kurki and it was mastered at the Cutting Room Studios by Björn Engelmann. Album was produced by Ville Sorvali and Profane Omen, except vocals were produced by Mikko Herranen

== Track listing ==
| No. | Title | Lyrics | Music | Length |
|---|---|---|---|---|
| 1. | "Seconds (Intro)" | | Kurki | 2:22 |
| 2. | "Base" | Näveri | Kurki, Saarenketo & Profane Omen | 5:37 |
| 3. | "Information" | Näveri, Kurki | Kurki, Saarenketo, Näveri & Profane Omen | 5:33 |
| 4. | "Superpowertrip" | Näveri | Kurki, Kokkonen & Profane Omen | 4:51 |
| 5. | "I Have Seen" | Kurki | Kurki & Profane Omen | 4:34 |
| 6. | "Left To Disintegrate" | Kurki & Näveri | Kurki & Profane Omen | 5:14 |
| 7. | "In The Middle I Breathe" | Kurki | Kurki & Profane Omen | 3:40 |
| 8. | "Right To Retaliate" | Kurki, Näveri | Kokkonen, Kurki & Profane Omen | 4:28 |
| 9. | "Generation Doom (Count Me Out)" | Näveri | Kokkonen, Mikkonen & Profane Omen | 5:15 |
| 10. | "Dealers of Guilt" | Kurki | Kurki, Kokkonen & Profane Omen | 4:03 |
| 11. | "Dodge" | Kurki | Kurki & Profane Omen | 4:42 |
| Total length: | | | | 50:19 |

== Chart positions ==
| Chart (2009) | Peak position |
|---|---|
| Finnish Albums Chart | 9 |

== Personnel ==
Jules Näveri: Vocals
Williami Kurki: Guitar
Antti Kokkonen: Guitar
Tuomas "Tomppa" Saarenketo: Bass
Samuli Mikkonen: Drums
