= Beneath (Amoral album) =

2011 studio album by Amoral

Studio album by Amoral
- Released: October 26, 2011
- Recorded: February 2011
- Studios: Sound Supreme Studios, Hämeenlinna, Finland
- Genres: Heavy metal, progressive metal
- Labels: Imperial Cassette, The End Records
- Producers: Janne Saksa, Ben Varon

Amoral chronology
Show Your Colors (2009)	Beneath (2011)	Fallen Leaves & Dead Sparrows (2014)

Beneath is the fifth studio album by Finnish heavy metal band Amoral. The album was released in Japan on 19 October 2011 through Marquee Avalon, in Europe on 26 October 2011 via Imperial Cassette, and in North America on 14 February 2012 through The End Records. In Russia, the album was released on 27 March 2012 by Fono Records.

== Background and recording ==
Beneath was produced by Janne Saksa and Ben Varon. Recording took place at Sound Supreme Studios in Hämeenlinna, Finland, in February 2011. The album was mixed by Saksa and mastered by Svante Forsbäck at Chartmakers Studios in Helsinki. Arrangements were handled by Amoral. Programming on the title track was arranged by Mikko P. Mustonen, and programming on "Wastelands" was handled by Saksa.

All songs and lyrics were written by Ben Varon, except "This Ever Ending Game" and "Hours of Simplicity", which were co-written with Masi Hukari. Additional backing vocals were contributed by Saksa.

The artwork and layout were created by Spanish artist Marta Nael, based on a concept by Varon. Photography was provided by Valtteri Hirvonen, and the band's skull logo was designed by Aki Siltala.

== Release and promotion ==
The lead single, "Same Difference", was released in mid-2011. The second single, "Silhouette", debuted on Radio Rock (Finland) in October 2011 and was accompanied by a music video. A second music video was produced for the track "Wrapped in Barbwire".

The album placed fourth in the public voting for Best Domestic Metal Album at the 2011 Finnish Metal Awards, and its cover art placed fifth.

== Track listing ==
All tracks are written by Ben Varon (except where noted).

No.	Title	Length
1.	"Beneath"	8:46
2.	"Wrapped in Barbwire"	2:59
3.	"Silhouette"	3:56
4.	"Things Left Unsaid"	4:58
5.	"(Won't Go) Home"	4:19
6.	"Closure"	5:37
7.	"Same Difference"	4:39
8.	"Hours of Simplicity" (Masi Hukari, Varon)	3:46
9.	"Wastelands"	3:39
10.	"This Ever Ending Game" (Hukari, Varon)	3:55
11.	"No Future"	3:56
12.	"Of Silent Stares and Fire Lost"	7:02
13.	"Staying Human" (Japanese edition bonus track)	5:24
14.	"Sleeping with the Strangers" (North American edition bonus track)	5:39

== Personnel ==
Amoral

- Ari Koivunen – lead vocals
- Ben Varon – lead and rhythm guitar, backing vocals
- Masi Hukari – rhythm and lead guitar
- Pekka Johansson – bass
- Juhana Karlsson – drums

Additional personnel

- Janne Saksa – backing vocals, additional programming on "Wastelands", production, mixing
- Mikko P. Mustonen – programming on "Beneath"
- Svante Forsbäck – mastering
- Marta Nael – artwork and layout
- Valtteri Hirvonen – photography
