= Disconnected EP =

Profane Omen

EP by Profane Omen
- Released: October 3, 2007
- Recorded: 14–20 May 2007
- Studio: Lahti City Hyena HQ and Villvox Studios
- Label: Dethrone Music

Profane Omen chronology
Beaten Into Submission (2006)	Profane Omen (2007)	Inherit The Void (2009)

Disconnected EP is an EP by Finnish metal band Profane Omen, released in 2007. It was recorded by Aleksanteri Kuosa, Pekka Mikkola and Ville Sorvali. It was mixed by those three and mastered by Minerva Pappi.

== Track listing ==
No.	Title	Lyrics	Music	Length
1.	"Intro"			2:04
2.	"Disconnected"	Näveri	Kurki, Kokkonen & Profane Omen	4:26
3.	"In Fear"	Näveri	Kurki & Profane Omen	3:43
4.	"Breed Suffocation, Breed Extinction"	Näveri	Kurki & Profane Omen	4:43
5.	"Learning to Die"	Kurki	Kurki	9:08
6.	"Slave to the Grind" (Skid Row cover)		Bach, Bolan Sabo	3:26
7.	"Wild Child" (W.A.S.P. cover)		Lawless, Holmes	4:00
Total length:				31:30

== Chart positions ==
Chart (2007)	Peak position
Finnish Singles Chart	4

== Personnel ==
Jules Näveri: Vocals
Williami Kurki: Guitar
Antti Kokkonen: Guitar
Tomppa Saarenketo: Bass
Samuli Mikkonen: Drums

Sari Laine: Guest vocals in "Breed Suffocation, Breed Extinction"
Taneli Jarva: Guest vocals in "Learning To Die"
