= II Taso =

Studio album by Kilpi
- Released: September 29, 2004
- Genre: Hard rock
- Length: 48:57

Kilpi chronology
Sähkönsinistä Sinfoniaa (2003)	II Taso (2004)	Kaaoksen Kuningas (2006)

II Taso is the second album from the Finnish hard rock band Kilpi.

== Track listing ==
1. "Tie turvatkaa" – 3:52
2. "Sielut iskee tulta" – 4:24
3. "Varjoista valoihin" – 4:17
4. "Laki (ei ole sama kaikille)" – 4:06
5. "Viimeinen näytös" – 3:36
6. "Sen tietää" – 5:17
7. "Kenen joukoissa seisot" – 4:31
8. "Eilinen" – 4:14
9. "Sumun maa" – 4:38
10. "Vapaana kaikesta" – 4:13
11. "Matkalla (instr.)" – 5:44
