= Beaten into Submission =

Profane Omen

Studio album by Profane Omen
- Released: September 6, 2006
- Recorded: 27 January – 12 February 2006
- Studio: Hideaway and Villvox Studios
- Genre: Groove metal
- Label: Dethrone Music
- Producer: Ville Sorvali

Profane Omen chronology
Profane Omen (2006)	Disconnected EP (2007)

Beaten Into Submission is the debut album by Finnish metal band Profane Omen. It was recorded 27 January-12 February 2006 at Hideaway and Villvox Studios by Aleksanteri Kuosa and Ville Sorvali. Recording was assisted by Secret Agent and Star Super Force. The album was mixed at Villvox by Aleksanteri Kuosa and mastered at Finnvox Studios by Minerva Pappi. Ville Sorvali (from Moonsorrow) was the producer and the co-producer was Aleksanteri Kuosa. Songs "Adrenaline" and "Enemies" were co-produced by Panu Willman.

Beaten Into Submission was also #28 on Finnish top-50 charts.

== Track listing ==
No.	Title	Lyrics	Music	Length
1.	"Intro (Profane Omen"		Kurki & Profane Omen	1:02
2.	"Adrenaline"	Näveri	Kurki & Profane Omen	3:52
3.	"Painbox"	Näveri	Kurki & Profane Omen	2:53
4.	"FMH (Fuck Me Hollow)"	Näveri	Kurki, Kokkonen & Profane Omen	3:25
5.	"Enemies"	Näveri	Kurki, Kokkonen & Profane Omen	7:15
6.	"Gunshot/Mindset"	Kurki & Näveri	Saarenketo & Profane Omen	2:52
7.	"Rewind"	Näveri & Kurki	Kurki & Profane Omen	4:06
8.	"Pit Of My Thoughts"	Näveri & Kurki	Kurki, Kokkonen & Profane Omen	5:06
9.	"God In A Bottle"	Kurki & Näveri	Kurki & Profane Omen	2:52
10.	"Damaged Justice"	Näveri	Kurki & Profane Omen	7:07
Total length:				42:01

== Chart positions ==
Chart (2006)	Peak position
Finnish Albums Chart	28

== Personnel ==
Jules Näveri: Vocals
Williami Kurki: Guitar
Antti Kokkonen: Guitar
Tuomas "Tomppa" Saarenketo: Bass
Samuli Mikkonen: Drums
