= Sähkönsinistä Sinfoniaa =

Studio album by Kilpi
- Released: May 28, 2003
- Studio: Studio Salsvilla, Studio Mielisholm
- Genre: Hard rock
- Length: 44:33

Kilpi chronology
Sähkönsinistä Sinfoniaa (2003)	II Taso (2004)

Sähkönsinistä Sinfoniaa (Finnish for Symphony in electric blue) is the first album from the Finnish hard rock band Kilpi.

== Track listing ==
1. "Tervetuloa (intro)" – 0:48
2. "Samaan aikaan toisaalla" – 4:44
3. "Antakaa aikaa" – 3:44
4. "Nerokasta ikävää" – 3:59
5. "Pahalle et käännä selkää" – 4:27
6. "Savuna ilmaan" – 4:15
7. "Kaksihaarainen kieli" – 4:25
8. "Villin Vaaran Kosto" – 4:27
9. "Piikkinä lihassa" – 4:58
10. "Tähtien lapset" – 4:55
11. "Helvetissä tavataan" – 3:44
