= Velcra =

Finnish industrial/electronic group

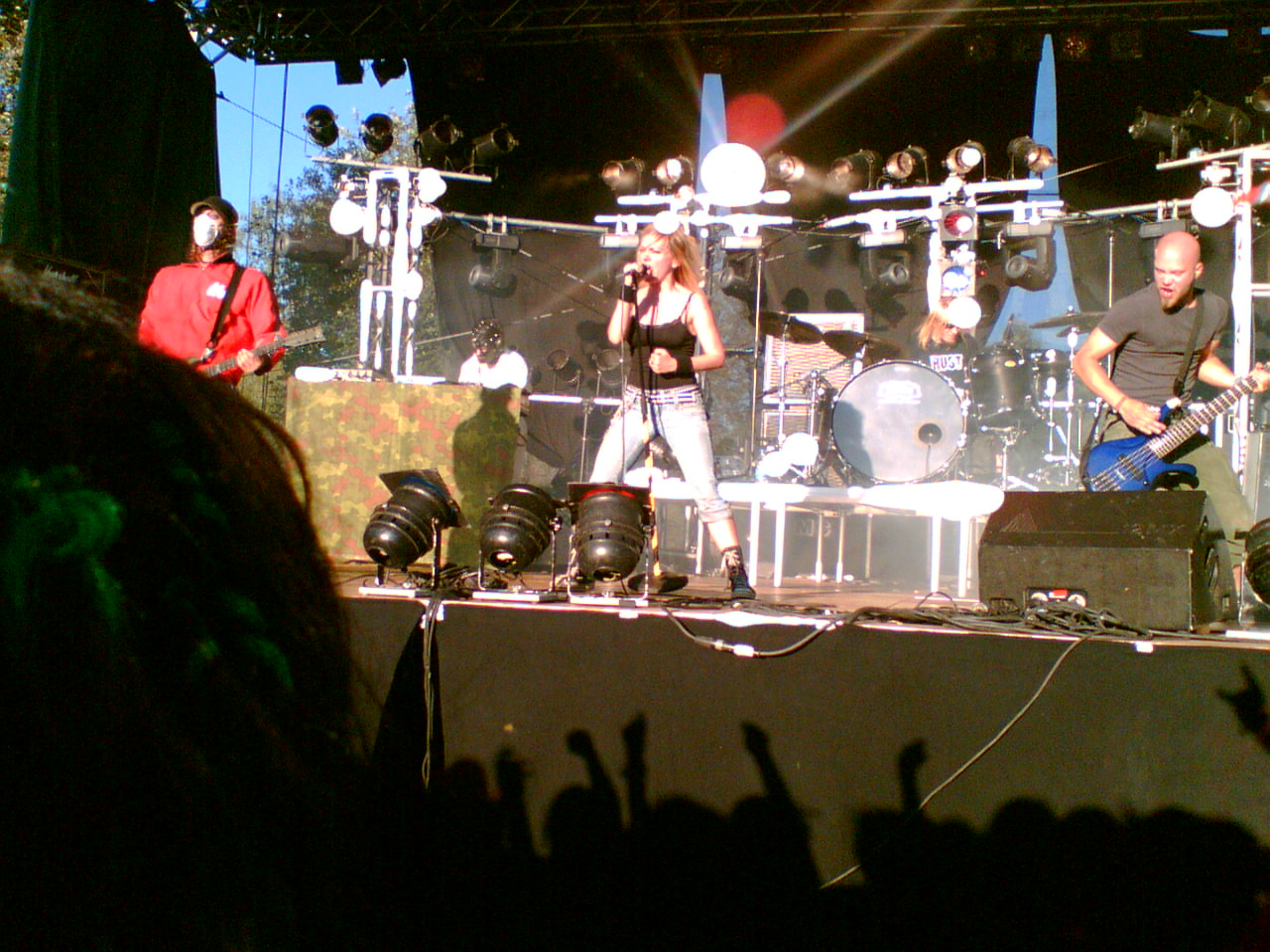
- Velcra live at Qstock, 2005.

Background information
- Origin: Helsinki, Finland
- Genres: Industrial metal, electronica, nu metal
- Years active: 2000–2008
- Labels: Underarts / Bonnier
- Members: Jessi Frey; O.D. DJ Freak; Ramonius; Timo Hänninen
- Past members: Teppo Hudson; Mikko Herranen; Wille Hartonen; Tomi Koivusaari
- Website: www.velcra.com

Velcra was a Finnish rock band, established 2000. Their music features female vocals (both clean and distorted) on a background of heavily distorted guitars and marching beats with heavy use of sample loops.

== History ==
They soon signed to Virgin Records to release an album. In 2002, Velcra released their debut CD, Consequences of Disobedience. The singles "Can't Stop Fighting" and "My Law" helped the band rise to No. 5 on the Finnish charts. Velcra also released the singles, "Big Brother" and "Test Animals". In 2005, the band released their second album, Between Force and Fate, and the single "Our Will Against Their Will" hit No. 3 on the Finnish chart. Since then, the band has made two more music videos, one for "Memory Loss" and one for "The Bong Song". For Between Force and Fate, the band dropped the catchy pop choruses from their music presented in their debut Consequences of Disobedience. This gives the album a much heavier sound, which is evident in songs such as "For My Loneliness I Pay". In June 2006, drummer Mikko Herranen left the band to focus on his other band RUST. On 30 May 2007, Velcra released their third album, Hadal. Videos of "Quick and Dirty" and "Dusk Becomes a Dawn" were released in 2007. The latter song has also been released as a single. In early 2008 Tomi Koivusaari left and Timo Hänninen joined the band.

== Members ==
- Jessi Frey - vocals
- Ramonius - bass guitar
- O.D. - guitar, programming
- DJ Freak - keyboards, sampling
- Timo Hänninen - guitar

== Former members ==
- Teppo Hudson - bass guitar - 2001-2005 (moved to London to study Arts Management and to pursue a solo career)
- Mikko Herranen - drums - 2001-2006 (left for his other band RUST)
- Wille Hartonen - bass guitar
- Tomi Koivusaari - guitar (concentrated on his other band Amorphis)

== Discography ==
- Consequences of Disobedience (2002)
- Between Force and Fate (2005)
- Hadal (2007)
