= Mikko Herranen =

Finnish musician

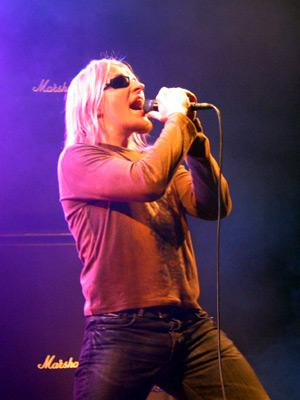
- Mikko Herranen

Background information
- Born: 9 April 1976 (age 49); Otava, Finland
- Genres: Hard rock, heavy metal
- Occupation(s): Musician, songwriter, record producer
- Instrument(s): Vocals, drums, bass, keyboards, guitar
- Years active: 1997–present
- Website: mikkoherranen

Mikko Herranen is a Finnish singer and musician. His current band Misterer is a thrash metal band from Helsinki and they are preparing songs for their upcoming debut album. Previously, he fronted RUST, which released three albums and several singles between 2003 and 2010. Herranen competed in Michael Monroe's team in the reality singing competition The Voice of Finland in 2012. His debut solo album Kylmä maailma was released through Johanna Kustannus in June 2012.

== Career ==
=== RUST ===
Herranen was the main composer and the singer/bass player of RUST, a post-grunge/metal band out of Helsinki. Since the band's formation in 2001, Herranen also produced all the band's recordings, including three full-length albums, two EPs and five singles. Their debut album Softly was released in August 2004 and it reached Top50 on the Finnish album chart. Finland's top nationwide Rock radio network YLEX chose "Softly" as the album of the week in August 2004.

=== Solo ===
After reaching Top8 on The Voice of Finland Herranen signed a record deal with Johanna/Universal to release his solo album Kylmä Maailma (Cold World). He has written all the songs, sings and plays all the instruments except cello and violin on the album that he had been writing for the past four years. His twin sister has written lyrics on two tracks, and his The Voice coach Michael Monroe makes an appearance playing sax and harmonica on one of the tracks. The album was recorded and mixed at his Noise Floor studio. The album debuted at No. 6 on the Finnish album chart.

=== Other projects ===
Apart from singing and playing a variety of instruments in several bands, Herranen has also established himself as a record producer and sound engineer both in studio and live concerts. He has predominantly been involved with the production of heavy metal recordings and concerts of such bands as Lullacry, Carnalation, Profane Omen, Kilt, Plastic Tears, The Chant, Iiwanajulma, Misery Inc., and Killpretty. As a lead vocalist, Herranen has fronted many cover bands playing the music of Iron Maiden, Alice in Chains, Metallica, and Pantera.

Mikko Herranen is a 2001 Rosemary Kennedy International Young Soloist Award Winner.

== Personal life ==
Herranen began studying piano at the age of three, drums at the age thirteen and voice in high school. At the Pop & Jazz Conservatory in Helsinki, he has been able to study, compose, produce and teach music. He is engaged to a vocal coach and singer Mari Multanen.

Despite his vision loss, Herranen is able to read and operate computers, mixing consoles and other machinery.

== Discography ==
Misterer

- Ignoramus -album TCM 2019
- Backrage -single TCM 2018
- Disconnected -single TCM 2018
- Perkelation -single TCM 2018

RUST

- The Black EP RUST/TCM 2003
- Miss You -single TCM 2004
- Ordinary World -single TCM 2004
- Softly -album TCM 2004
- Addiction/Levottomat 3 Movie Soundtrack Poko 2004
- Pray -single Edel 2004
- Slave -single TCM 2005
- Away -single 92Dawn 2006
- Songs of Suffocation -album 92Dawn 2006
- Scars -EP 92Dawn 2007
- Dark Deep Times -album RUST 2010

Velcra

- Consequences of Disobedience, Virgin Records (EMI) 2001
- Between Force and Fate, EMI 2005
- Hadal (drums, recording), Bonnier Amigo 2007

Killpretty

- The Art of Letting Go (producer, recording, mixing, mastering) 2006

Beagon

- Traffic (mixing) 2007

Misery Inc.

- ...BreedGreedBreed... (producing, recording) 2007

Iiwanajulma

- Tuhottu tila (producing, recording, mixing 2008

The Chant

- Ghostlines (mixing) 2008

Plastic Tears

- Nine Lives Never Dies (recording, mixing, keyboards) 2009

Kilt

- Everything / Nothing (recording, mixing, vocals) 2009

Profane Omen

- Inherit The Void (vocal production) 2009

Lullacry

- Where Angels Fear (recording, mixing, producing, vocals) 2012

== Filmography ==
- Addiction (Levottomat 3) composer: Miss You (2004)
- Game Over arranger: "The Bong Song – BamBamBholeRemix" (2005)
- Tuuliajolla – Rockumentary film from Saimaa (2006)
- Not Born To Rock – composer (6 episodes, 2007)
- Pokeritähti 2007 – composer: theme music (12 episodes, 2008)
