= Show Your Colors =

Studio album by Amoral
- Released: May 6, 2009
- Studios: Sound Supreme Studio, Finland
- Genres: Heavy metal, power metal, progressive metal
- Length: 44:45
- Label: Spinefarm

Amoral chronology
Reptile Ride (2007)	Show Your Colors (2009)	Beneath (2011)

Singles from Show Your Colors
- 1. "Year of the Suckerpunch" Released: January 21, 2009

Professional ratings
Review scores
Source	Rating
Blistering	7/10 stars
Danger Dog	4/5 stars
Metal Express Radio	9/10 stars
Power Play	8/8 stars
Rock Sound	7/10 stars

Show Your Colors is the fourth studio album by Finnish metal band Amoral.

== Background ==
Amoral's fourth studio album was announced in November 2008 when the band announced Ari Koivunen as their new front man. On January 21, their first single was put up the band's MySpace account. The first single is entitled Year of the Suckerpunch and the song is clearly distinctive from any of Amoral's previous material, and is built around Ari's higher pitched, clean, melodic voice, as opposed to former vocalist Niko Kalliojärvi's growling death metal vocals. The album was released May 6, 2009.

== Track listing ==
No.	Title	Writer(s)	Length
1.	"Random Words"	Varon	1:51
2.	"Release"	Ots, Varon	5:50
3.	"A Shade of Gray"	Ots, Varon	4:10
4.	"Year of the Suckerpunch"	Varon	5:04
5.	"Perfection Design"	Ots, Varon	3:58
6.	"Sex n' Satan"	Varon	2:47
7.	"Song for the Stubborn"	Ots, Varon	3:21
8.	"Vivid"	Palin, Varon	4:02
9.	"Gave Up Easy"	Ots, Varon	4:02
10.	"Last October"	Varon	3:13
11.	"Exit"	Varon	6:23

Japan Bonus Track
No.	Title	Length
12.	"Dig Up Her Bones (Misfits cover)"

== Personnel ==
Amoral

- Ari Koivunen - vocals, backing vocals
- Ben Varon - guitar
- Silver Ots - guitar
- Juhana Karlsson - drums
- Pekka Johansson - bass

Additional

- Janne Saksa - recording, producing, backing vocals
- Svante Forsbäck- mastering
- Mika Latvala - piano (10)

== Release history ==
Region	Date
UK	May 11, 2009
Germany	May 22, 2009
US	June 9, 2009
Canada	June 16, 2009
Japan	July 22, 2009
