= Fallen Leaves & Dead Sparrows =

Studio album by Amoral
- Released: February 14, 2014
- Genres: Progressive metal, heavy metal
- Length: 54:53
- Label: Imperial Cassette
- Producers: Ben Varon, vocals: Marko Hietala

Amoral chronology
| Beneath (2011) | Fallen Leaves & Dead Sparrows (2014) | In Sequence (2016) |

Fallen Leaves & Dead Sparrows is the sixth studio album by Finnish heavy metal band Amoral. It was released by Imperial Cassette in Finland on February 14, 2014. It was published by G-Regords and released in the rest of Europe on March 28, 2014, and the United Kingdom edition was published by Graphite Records and released on March 31, 2014.

"Fallen Leaves & Dead Sparrows" was produced by Ben Varon. Drums were recorded at Sound Supreme studios by Janne Saksa. Guitars, bass, and keyboards were recorded at the home studios of Amoral. Guitars were re-amped at Sonic Pump Studios. Vocals were recorded at Marco's Cockpit by Marko Hietala. The album was mixed by Janne Saksa and mastered by Svante Forsbäck. Arrangements were by Amoral.

The album has a more progressive metal sound than Amoral's previous 2 albums.

"Fallen Leaves & Dead Sparrows" has received predominantly positive reviews from heavy metal magazines and webzines around Finland, Europe, and the United States.

== Music and lyrics ==
Music is by Amoral, story and lyrics are by Ben Varon. Orchestral programming on "Prolong A Stay" is made by Mikko P. Mustonen.

== Artwork ==
Artwork of the album and Skull-logo are by Aki Siltala. Calligraphy was hand made by Terhi Hursti. Layout is by Pasi Moilanen and photography is by Valtteri Hirvonen.

== Track listing ==
| No. | Title | Length |
|---|---|---|
| 1. | "On the Other Side Pt. I" | 7:14 |
| 2. | "No Familiar Faces" | 4:06 |
| 3. | "Prolong a Stay" | 7:39 |
| 4. | "Blueprints" | 4:20 |
| 5. | "If Not Here, Where?" | 9:15 |
| 6. | "The Storm Arrives" | 6:25 |
| 7. | "See This Through" | 6:39 |
| 8. | "On The Other Side Pt. II" | 9:14 |

Singles

- If not here, Where? (2013)
- No Familiar Faces (2014)

Videos

- Blueprints (2014)

== Personnel ==
- Ari Koivunen - vocals
- Ben Varon - lead, rhythm & acoustic guitars, backing vocals
- Juhana Karlsson - drums
- Masi Hukari - lead & rhythm guitars, keyboards
- Pekka Johansson - bass
