= Reptile Ride =

Studio album by Amoral
- Released: August 15, 2007
- Genres: Progressive metal, technical death metal, melodic death metal, thrash metal
- Length: 41:50
- Label: Spikefarm

Amoral chronology
Decrowning (2005)	Reptile Ride (2007)	Show Your Colors (2009)

Professional ratings
Review scores
Source	Rating
Chronicles of Chaos	6.5/10
Metal Express Radio	7.5/10

Reptile Ride is the title of Amoral's third album which was released in Japan on August 10, 2007 and on August 15, 2007 in the rest of the world. The album reached no. 5 in the Finnish charts.

== Track listing ==
No.	Title	Length
1.	"Leave Your Dead Behind"	5:00
2.	"Nervasion"	4:27
3.	"Hang Me High"	3:11
4.	"Mute"	4:32
5.	"Few and Far Between"	5:44
6.	"Snake Skin Saddle"	4:20
7.	"D-Drop Bop"	3:08
8.	"Apocalyptic Sci-Fi Fun"	5:39
9.	"Pusher"	5:44

Japan Bonus Track
No.	Title	Length
10.	"The Naked Sun (Pandora cover)"

== Credits ==
=== Band members ===
- Niko Kalliojärvi - vocals
- Erkki Silvennoinen - bass
- Ben Varon - guitar
- Silver Ots - guitar
- Juhana Karlsson - drums
