= DJ Freak =

British DJ and producer

John Bennett, known as DJ Freak, is an English hardcore music DJ and producer. He is credited as one of the first pioneers of the industrial hardcore/speedcore sound.

== Musical career ==
DJ Freak has released over 50 albums to date. He was one of the early pioneers of hardcore and speedcore music in 1992. He has been released on his own two labels, Boneheddz and Hard of Hearing, and other labels such as Killout, Epitaph and Deadly Systems. In 2011, he began releasing side project material in a different style, dark spacey minimal looped abstract techno. He releases these as free downloads, on his pages on SoundCloud and Bandcamp. Freak released a track on Scottish label Motormouth Recordz compilation "Motörheadz - The Album" in 2012 and also a digital only EP on the same label in 2014.

== Hard of Hearing ==
In the early 1990s, DJ Freak founded the label Hard of Hearing. It was geared towards subgenres of electronic music such as gabber and hardcore. Practically every release on this label was a DJ Freak release, however, other artists did make appearances on these albums. His most recognised and seminal work was released on Killout. The Hard of Hearing label ended in 1998.

In 2009, DJ Freak released an album called Hard of Hearing Reloaded.

== Discography ==
Year	Release
AKA Noise Emission EP	1994
Abduction EP	1995
EP Vol. 1	1995
EP Vol. 2	1995
EP Vol. 3	1995
EP Vol. 4	1995
Heavy Metal Poisoning Pt.1	1995
Heavy Metal Poisoning Pt.2	1995
Industrial Trauma	1995
Behold The Dreamer	1996
EP Vol. 6	1996
Dead on Arrival	1996
Natural Born Killa	1996
Wenn Wir Hart Bleiben, Ueberleben Wir...	1996
Alien Raves, Drug Crazed Rioters And Man Eating Machines E.P.	1997
Untitled (vs Skullblower)	1997
DJ Misfoster Od Groedpistolen EP (vs Noize Creator)	1997
The Anti Nazi Pack (vs Noize Creator)	1997
Untitled (vs Smarti)	1998
Le Freak Est Mort??	1998
Extreme Hardcore Shit (vs Extrement)	1998
Untitled (vs Senical)	1998
Untitled (vs Senical)	1998
Unknown Territories	1999
Fuck Denny Lee	1999
Hicks Rools Man	1999
Analogue Terror	2000
Hard Funk EP	2000
Untitled	2000
The Rapture EP	2001
Lost Worlds EP	2004
Killout Revisited	2005
World Collapse EP	2008
Rot in Hell E.P.	2009
High Supply E.P.	2010
Nuclear Fission EP	2010
The Beauty of Harmony Aka Dark Room Distorzion	2011
The Archion Intrusion EP	2011
Welcome to the Future EP	2011
Programmed To Destruct Ep (vs 5th Raider)	2011
Control The Infinite EP	2011
Big Time E.P.	2011
Deeper Darkness EP	2014

== External sources ==
- DJ Freak discography at Discogs
- DJ Freak Fan Page on Myspace
- Hard Of Hearing
- B.E.A.S.T. Records
