= Misery Inc. =

Finnish metal band

- Origin: Myrskylä, Finland
- Genres: Heavy metal, groove metal, melodic death metal
- Years active: 2001–2008
- Members: Niko Mankinen; Mikko Herranen; Janne Tolonen; Teemu Ylämäki; Aki Heikinheimo; Joonas Kauppinen
- Website: miseryinc.org

Misery Inc. was a Finnish metal band formed in Myrskylä in 2001. Janne on guitar, Jukka on bass, Jonttu on drums and singer Jukkis. Their original plan was to make music without any lead guitars but then it turned out to be a bit boring. Teemu joined the band and so Misery Inc. were complete.

The band's debut album Yesterday's Grave was released through ZYX Music 2003. In summer 2005, Misery Inc. signed a deal with Firebox Records, and in February 2006 they released their second album, Random End. In 2007, Misery Inc. signed a deal with Finnish record label Johanna Kustannus (Megamania), and third their album Breedgreedbreed was released on 10 October 2007.

In September 2008, Misery Inc. stopped performing due to many member changes.

== Members ==
- Niko Mankinen – vocals (2005–2008)
- Mikko Herranen – vocals (2008)
- Janne Tolonen – guitar (2001–2008)
- Teemu Ylämäki – guitar (2001–2008)
- Aki Heikinheimo – bass (2005–2008)
- Joonas Kauppinen – drums (2001–2008)

=== Former members ===
- Jukkis Huuhtanen – vocals (2001–2005)
- Jukka Keisala – bass (2001–2005)
- Jules Näveri – vocals (2004–2007)
- Tommi Niemi – vocals (2007)

== Discography ==
- Yesterday's Grave (ZYX Music, 2003; Firebox Records, 2008 (re-issue))
- Random End (Firebox Records, 2006)
- Modern Day Human Waste CDS (Johanna Kustannus (Megamania), 2007)
- Breedgreedbreed (Johanna Kustannus (Megamania), 2007)

=== Music videos ===
- "Fallen Rage" (2006, directed by Jani Saajanaho)
