= Random End =

Studio album by Misery Inc.
- Released: 8 February 2006
- Recorded: Fall 2005
- Studio: Sonic Pump Studios
- Genre: Groove metal
- Length: 41:04
- Label: Firebox
- Producer: Aksu Hanttu

Random End is the second album from Finnish metal band Misery Inc., released in spring 2006. The album was recorded at Grooveland (drums and bass), Monttu (guitars) and Wace Sound (vocals and keyboards) studios during fall 2005. Produced by Aksu Hanttu & Misery Inc. Mixed by Aksu Hanttu & Nino Laurenne at Sonic Pump Studios. Mastered by Svante Forsbäck at Chartmakers.

The album was rated a 7 out of 10 by Chronicles of Chaos.

== Track listing ==
1. Hymn for Life
2. Fallen Rage
3. Further/Deeper
4. Yesterday's Grave
5. Apologies Denied
6. Cyanide
7. Source Of Fatal Addiction
8. Greed Rules the World
9. Truth
10. No Excuse For Weakness
11. …Out Of Here Alive

All songs written by Tolonen & Ylämäki except Further/Deeper was participated by Kauppinen. Lyrics by Tolonen, Näveri, Mankinen.
