= Wound Creations =

Studio album by Amoral
- Released: May 17, 2004
- Genres: Melodic death metal, technical death metal
- Label: Rage of Achilles

Amoral chronology
Wound Creations (2004)	Decrowning (2005)

Professional ratings
Review scores
Source	Rating
Metal Temple	8/10
Metal.de	6/10
Metal1.info	9/10

Wound Creations is the first full-length album of the former death metal band Amoral. It was first released under Rage of Achilles records in 2004, then re-released under Spikefarm Records later that year. The band celebrated its 10th anniversary in 2014.

== Track listing ==
No.	Title	Length
1.	"The Verge"	1:47
2.	"Atrocity Evolution"	6:13
3.	"Silent Renewal"	2:19
4.	"Solvent"	4:41
5.	"The Last Round"	8:41
6.	"Other Flesh"	5:42
7.	"Distract"	3:42
8.	"Nothing Daunted (Gallows Pole Rock 'n Roll)"	8:09
9.	"Languor Passage"	6:08

== Personnel ==
- Niko Kalliojärvi - vocals
- Ben Varon – guitar
- Silver Ots – guitar
- Erkki Silvennoinen – bass
- Juhana Karlsson – drums
