= Decrowning =

Studio album by Amoral
- Released: May 24, 2005
- Genres: Technical death metal, melodic death metal, thrash metal
- Label: Spikefarm Records

Amoral chronology
Wound Creations (2004)	Decrowning (2005)	Reptile Ride (2007)

Professional ratings
Review scores
Source	Rating
Blabbermouth.net	7/10
Metal.de	8/10
Metal1.info	9.5/10

Decrowning is the second full-length album of the former death metal band Amoral. It was released under Spikefarm Records in 2005. A music video has been shot for the song "Lacrimal Gland". The band reformed to perform a series of concerts for the 20th anniversary of the album in 2025.

== Track listing ==
All tracks by Niko Kalliojärvi, Silver Ots & Ben Varon

No.	Title	Length
1.	"Showdown"	6:09
2.	"Lacrimal Gland"	4:11
3.	"Decrowning"	4:34
4.	"Tiebreaker"	3:41
5.	"Drug of Choice"	2:52
6.	"Denial 101"	4:45
7.	"Control Cancer"	4:44
8.	"Raptus"	2:38
9.	"Warp"	2:16
10.	"Bleeder"	5:05

Japan Bonus Track
No.	Title	Length
11.	"Wildside (Mötley Crüe cover)"

== Personnel ==
Amoral

- Niko Kalliojärvi - vocals
- Ben Varon – guitar
- Silver Ots – guitar
- Erkki Silvennoinen – bass
- Juhana Karlsson – drums

Additional

- Ari Perkele (Dauntless) – support lyrics
- Sami Helle (Dauntless) – support lyrics
- J (Elenium) – support lyrics
- Markus Vanhala (Omnium Gatherum) – guitar
