= Profane Omen =

Finnish groove metal band

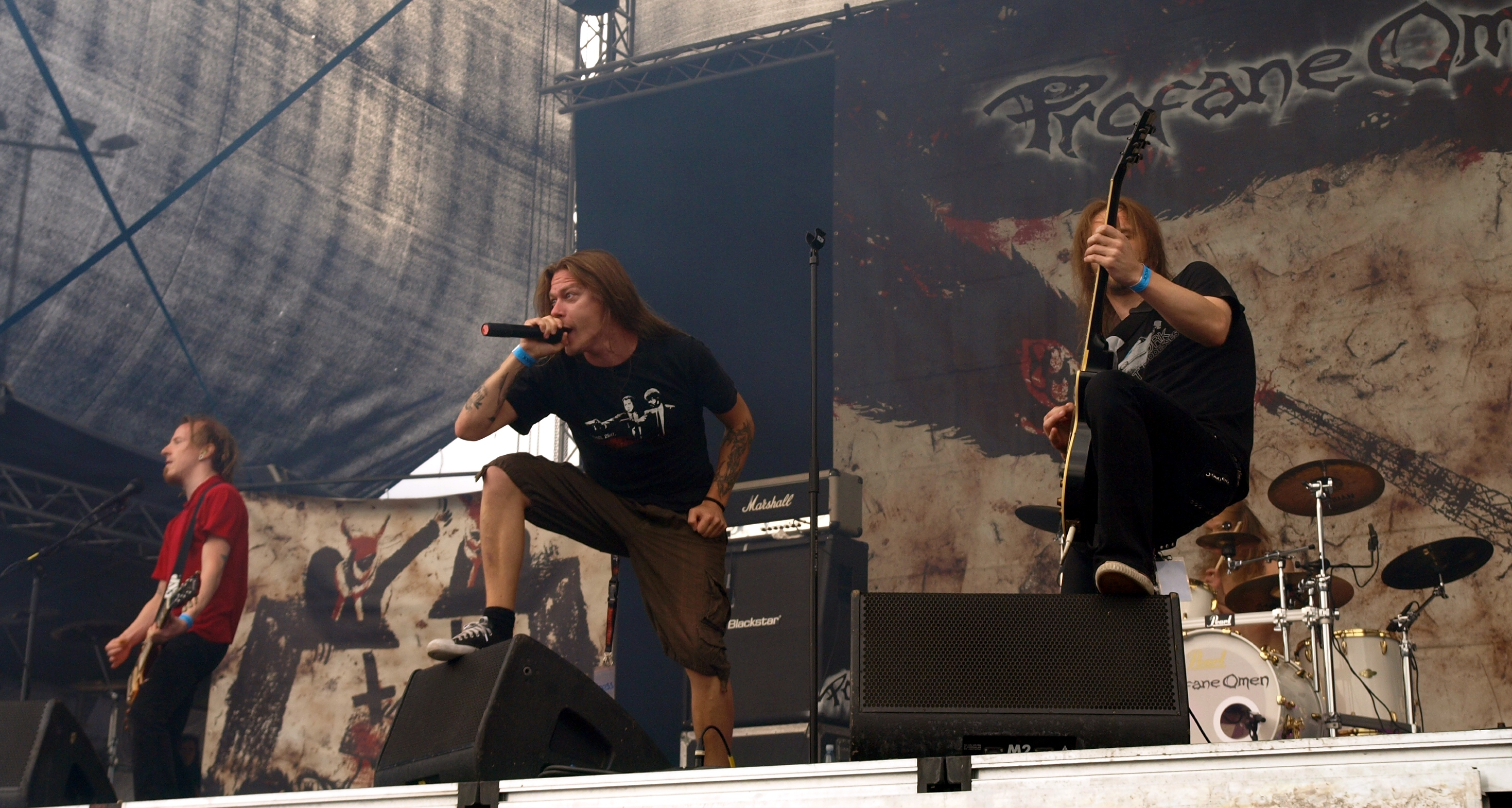
- Live am Myötätuulirock 2011

Background information
- Origin: Lahti, Finland
- Genres: Groove metal
- Years active: 1999-present
- Labels: Metalheim
- Members: Jules Näveri – Vocals; Williami Kurki – Guitars; Antti Kokkonen – Guitars & Backing Vocals; Samuli Mikkonen – Drums; Antti Seroff – Bass
- Website: profaneomen.net

Profane Omen is a Finnish groove metal band formed in 1999. They made two demos in 2000 (Profane Omen and Bittersweet Omen). Two other demos were recorded in 2001, Fuck the Beast and Load of Lead, and later they released an EP, Label of Black, which was their first official release. In early 2004, PO recorded a single, "Adrenaline/Enemies". They also made a music video for their song "Adrenaline".

In 2006, they released their first full-length, Beaten into Submission, which was generally embraced for its unique, aggressive sound and groovy riffs, combining elements of groove, thrash and melodic death metal.

In 2007, Profane Omen was voted as a "Newcomer of the year" at Finnish Metal Awards (FMA).

In 2007, they released an EP called Disconnected.

In March 2009, Profane Omen released their second studio album Inherit the Void. It was placed 8th of the top 10 albums in Finland.

In November 2010, the band announced that Tomppa Saarenketo is no longer part of it. The reason for this is low motivation regarding the band. Antti Seroff replaced him in bass.

== Discography ==
Studio albums

Year	Album	Peak positions	Certification
Year	Album	NOR	Certification
2006	Beaten into Submission	28	
2009	Inherit the Void	9	
2011	Destroy!	15	
2014	Reset	14	
2018	Ooka	19	

EPs

Year	Album	Peak positions	Certification
Year	Album	NOR	Certification
2007	Disconnected EP	4	

== Music videos ==
- "Disconnected" (directed by Jani Saajanaho) 2007
- "Left to Disintegrate" (directed by Toni Salminen) 2009
