= Amoral (band) =

Finnish heavy metal band

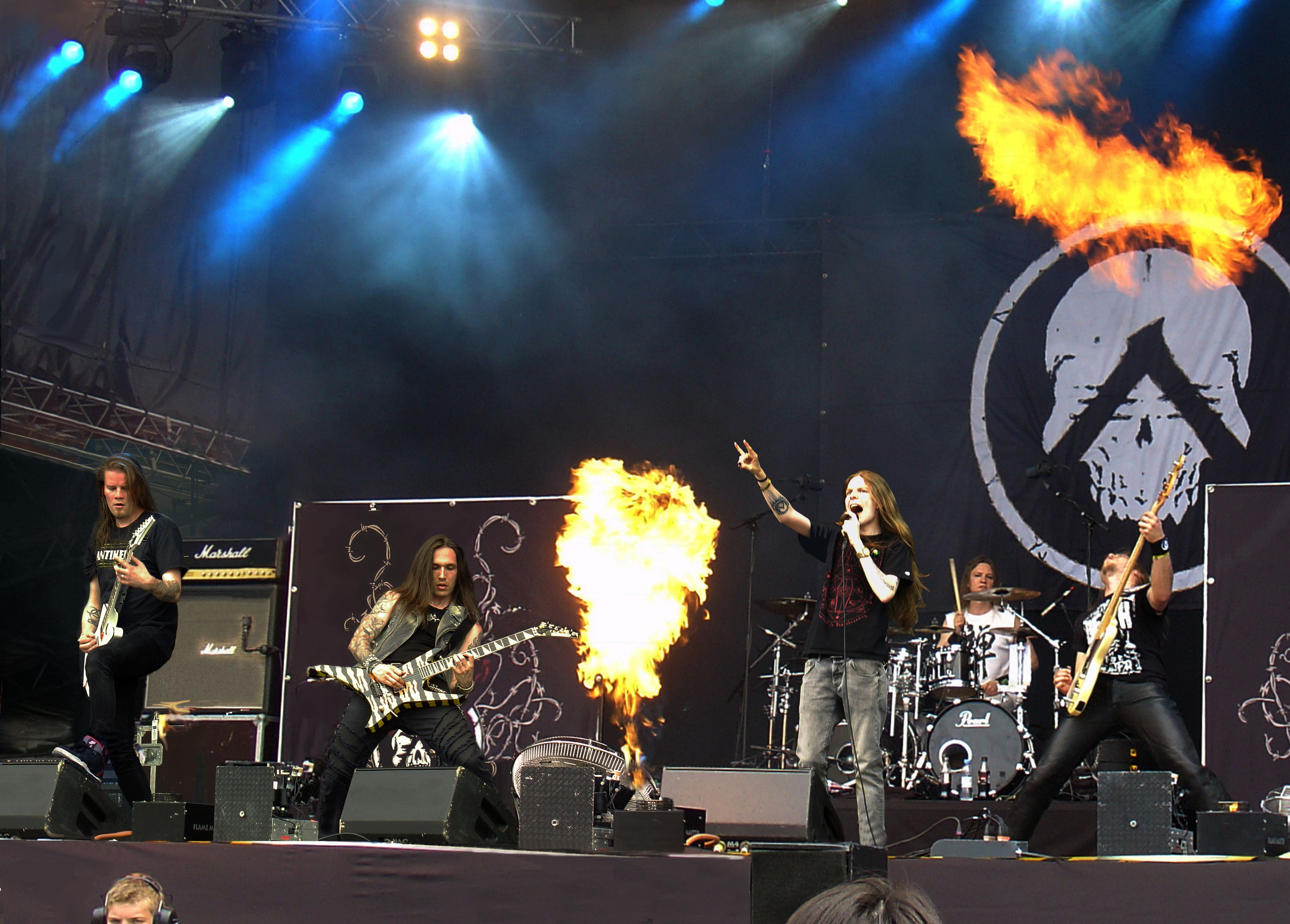
- Amoral at Tuska Open Air 2012

Background information
- Origin: Helsinki, Finland
- Genres: Progressive metal; power metal; technical death metal; melodic death metal; thrash metal
- Years active: 1997–2017, 2024–present
- Label: Imperial Cassette
- Members: Ben Varon; Silver Ots; Erkki Silvennoinen; Juhana Karlsson; Niko Kalliojärvi
- Past members: Ari Koivunen; Masi Hukari; Matti Pitkänen; Ville Sorvali; Pekka Johansson

Amoral are a Finnish progressive metal band from Helsinki, formed in 1997. They released seven studio albums between 2004 and 2016. Amoral performed in bars, clubs, festivals and other venues in Finland, Europe, Japan, China, Philippines and the US. The band split up in 2017 after 20 years, then reformed in 2024 for a series of concerts to celebrate the 20th anniversary of their 2005 album Decrowning.

== History ==
=== Early times ===
Teenagers Ben Varon and Juhana Karlsson formed Amoral in 1997. Silver Ots joined soon after. First vocalist Matti Pitkänen was replaced with Niko Kalliojärvi. Former band members included Ville Sorvali from Moonsorrow on bass. Before Sorvali joined Amoral, the band did not have a bass player, so Ots played bass on some of their demos. Amoral released two demos, Desolation and Other Flesh, with varying line-ups, and played a few minor shows before releasing their first full-length album.

=== Wound Creations ===
Amoral signed with Rage of Achilles Records and released their first album, Wound Creations, in 2004. After the bankruptcy of Rage of Achilles, Amoral was picked up by Spinefarm, a division of Spinefarm Records, a major Finnish rock and heavy metal record label with whom they re-released Wound Creations and added a bonus track ("Metamorphosis" from an early demo) to mark the new release version. The album received predominantly positive reviews from metal magazines and webzines around Finland and Europe. Amoral played numerous shows following the release and thenceforth. Their rise from the underground metal scene was further marked by a month-long European tour with metal bands Finntroll and Naglfar, and their inclusion in Tuska Open Air Metal Festival 2005, Finland's most important heavy metal festival.

=== Decrowning ===
Soon after the 2005 European tour, Amoral returned to the studio to record their second album, Decrowning. The album was released in Finland and several other countries in October 2005 and in Japan and the United States in March 2006. A music video was shot for the song "Lacrimal Gland". The band embarked on a second European tour in the spring of 2006. The 37-date tour was headlined by Dark Funeral and Naglfar, and supported by Amoral, Endstille, and Asmodeus.

=== Reptile Ride ===
Amoral's third album was recorded in Studio Sound Supreme in Hämeenlinna in early 2007 and was released in August 2007. A video was shot for the opening track and first and only single, "Leave Your Dead Behind".

=== Show Your Colors ===
Amoral's fourth studio album was announced in November 2008 when the band announced Ari Koivunen as their new vocalist. The album was the debut of bassist Pekka Johansson. On 21 January 2009, first single "Year of the Suckerpunch" was released on the band's MySpace page. The album replaced the band's customary growling with clean vocals and an emphasis on choruses. "Year of the Suckerpunch" was on the Finnish national radio Ylex's playlist with the highest hopes of receiving song of the year for 2009. The album, titled Show Your Colors, was released 6 May 2009. Show Your Colors was also released in the UK, Germany, the US, Canada and Japan. The album was ranked by public voting as the fifth-best domestic metal album at the Finnish Metal Awards 2009.

On 12 January 2010, the band announced that Amoral and Silver Ots had parted ways. Valtteri Hirvonen, who had already played at the European tour 2009 replacing Silver, was announced to be the "permanent stand-in guitarist" for the time being.

=== Beneath ===
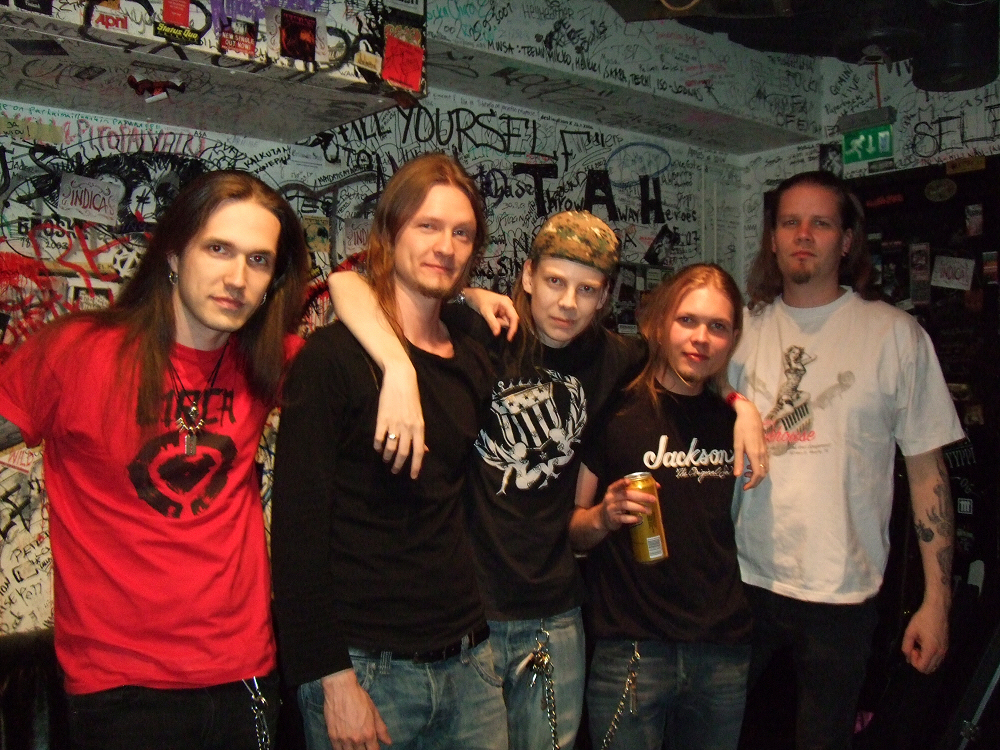
Amoral in 2011

In 2010, Amoral worked with its fifth album, Beneath. At the end of 2010, they announced their new guitarist Masi Hukari, who shared the lead guitar with Ben Varon and also co-wrote two of the songs.

In 2011, the band recorded Beneath at Sound Supreme studios in Hämeenlinna; the CD was released later the same year, in October. The album was produced by Janne Saksa and guitarist Ben Varon. Beneath continued on the path Amoral started with Show Your Colors. The emphasis is still on songwriting, big hooks, new arrangements, and guitar riffs, but the scale is wider than before: From nine-minute epics "Beneath", to straightforward rock songs "Silhouette" and "Same Difference", to nods to the band's death metal past ("(Won't Go) Home" and "Staying Human"), and talks between acoustic guitars and industrial landscapes in "Wastelands". The first single, "Same Difference", was released in the summer of 2011. The second single, "Silhouette", was played first time on Radio Rock (FI) in October 2011 and was followed by a video. "Silhouette" has both electric and acoustic versions, from which the acoustic one is the original. The second video was made from the punk rock-oriented track "Wrapped in Barbwire", which pays obeisance to Guns N' Roses video "Garden of Eden". On 14 February 2012, Beneath was released in the US via The End Records and in Mexico on 15 February. In Russia it was out 27 March 2012 via Fono Records. The album was ranked by public voting as the fourth-best domestic metal album at the Finnish Metal Awards 2011.

On 15 March 2012, Amoral made its US live debut at the South by Southwest (SXSW) event in Austin, Texas. The band debuted in China, at Shanghai, in May, and during the same tour they performed with other Finnish bands Insomnium, Profane Omen and Swallow the Sun at The Finland Fest 2012 Metal Attack in Liquid Room, Tokyo. Amoral toured in Europe in autumn 2012 supporting Finnish Viking metal band Ensiferum.

=== Fallen Leaves & Dead Sparrows ===
In 2013, the band toured Asia in April and May and played at Pulp Summer Slam festival in the Philippines and at the Peking and Shanghai Midi Festivals in China. The festival in Peking was the biggest one in the band's history with an audience of 10,000 people.

2013 also saw Amoral record their sixth album, Fallen Leaves & Dead Sparrows. It was released in Finland on 14 February 2014 and digitally all over the world by Imperial Cassette. In Europe, the album was released on 28 March 2014 and in the UK via Graphite Records on 1 March 2014. The album was produced by Ben Varon. Marko Hietala produced the vocals of Ari Koivunen. The music is changed more progressive than ever and it has more metallic touch as the two previous albums. The album received predominantly positive reviews from metal magazines and webzines around Finland, Europe and the US. The band has been praised for their instrumental and vocal skills and liberated versatile music. The first video, "Blueprints", was made by Valtteri Hirvonen.

On 28 March 2014, Amoral celebrated their ten-year-old first album in Nosturi, Helsinki, together with Profane Omen and MyGrain, who were also celebrating their 15- and 10-year anniversaries. Amoral published a full concert video on YouTube with material from their three first albums and the sixth album. Amoral played at Tuska Open Air in Helsinki in June 2014. In late 2014, the band had a club tour in Finland. They toured in Europe in November 2014 as the main support act for Swedish metal band Dark Tranquillity.

=== In Sequence ===
In April 2014, Amoral started the pre-production of their seventh album, and the studio work started on 13 February 2015. On 26 March 2015, they announced that Niko Kalliojärvi had returned to the band, both as the third guitarist and for singing growled vocals. At the end of June 2015, Amoral performed at Tuska After Party in Helsinki, where they played the song "Rude Awakening" from the upcoming album.

At the end of November 2015, it was announced that the album, titled In Sequence, would be released in Japan on 29 January 2016 through Ward Records, and globally on 5 February 2016 through Imperial Cassette (Gordeon Music, GSA / Nightmare Records, North America). The album continued the progressive metal style of Fallen Leaves & Dead Sparrows. Beside the six members, there are also some guest musicians featured in the album, such as percussionist Teho Majamäki, Indica singer Jonsu, and Amine Benotmane from Acyl. The first single, "Rude Awakening", was published in December 2015 on YouTube, and the second one, "The Next One to Go", at the end of January 2016. In an interview with German metal website Negatief.de, Ben Varon spoke about the album's concept:

"...in general we wanted to keep the focus on clean vocals, even though Niko is back in the band. I think the melodic side of Amoral is such a big part of us nowadays. I didn't wanna go all the way back to growling. Niko's vocals are more a special effect that we use when it's necessary and brings that "extra something" to the song. Then again Niko also came back as a guitar player... The album is obviously heavier because of Niko. Ari sings super clean. There is no rock'n'roll in his sound on the new album. Niko does all the aggressive parts and when Ari comes in its really smooth and deep."

The In Sequence tour took place in Finland in early 2016.

=== Disbandment ===
On 27 July 2016, the band announced that they would be disbanding at the beginning of 2017:

"It is with heavy hearts that we announce that we've decided to disband Amoral. This was not an easy decision, as this band has been such a huge part of our lives (in the case of Ben and Juhana, for about 19 years!), but yet it felt like it was time. Constantly conflicting schedules and a fading interest in touring in some members have made the band run at half-speed. Amoral is not a "half-speed" band. It's all or nothing. And, to be honest, the idea of starting something brand new after all this time has become very appealing...."

Amoral had an "Old School Tour" in Finland in autumn 2016, where they played only the first three albums. The tour was closing the band's career as it started. The final show took place at Tavastia Club in Helsinki, Finland on 5 January 2017, together with all the members of the band's history.

=== Reformation ===
On 11 November 2024, the band announced that they reformed and would perform a series of concerts for the 20th anniversary of the album Decrowning in 2025, featuring the album's lineup that includes vocalist Niko Kalliojärvi, guitarist Silver Ots, and bassist Erkki Silvennoinen.

== Musical style ==
The band's initial style was described as "Progressive, technical and melodic death-thrashing metal." Their fourth album, Show Your Colors, was an about-turn, replacing the dominance of death metal with a more melodic direction that includes the occasional sing-along chorus. Their final album before temporarily disbanding, In Sequence, marks the return of vocalist Niko Kalliojärvi and their deathly roots, while standing by their stylistic stance as a power metal band. Their deathly roots would be dominant again in the Decrowning 20th anniversary tour.

== Members ==
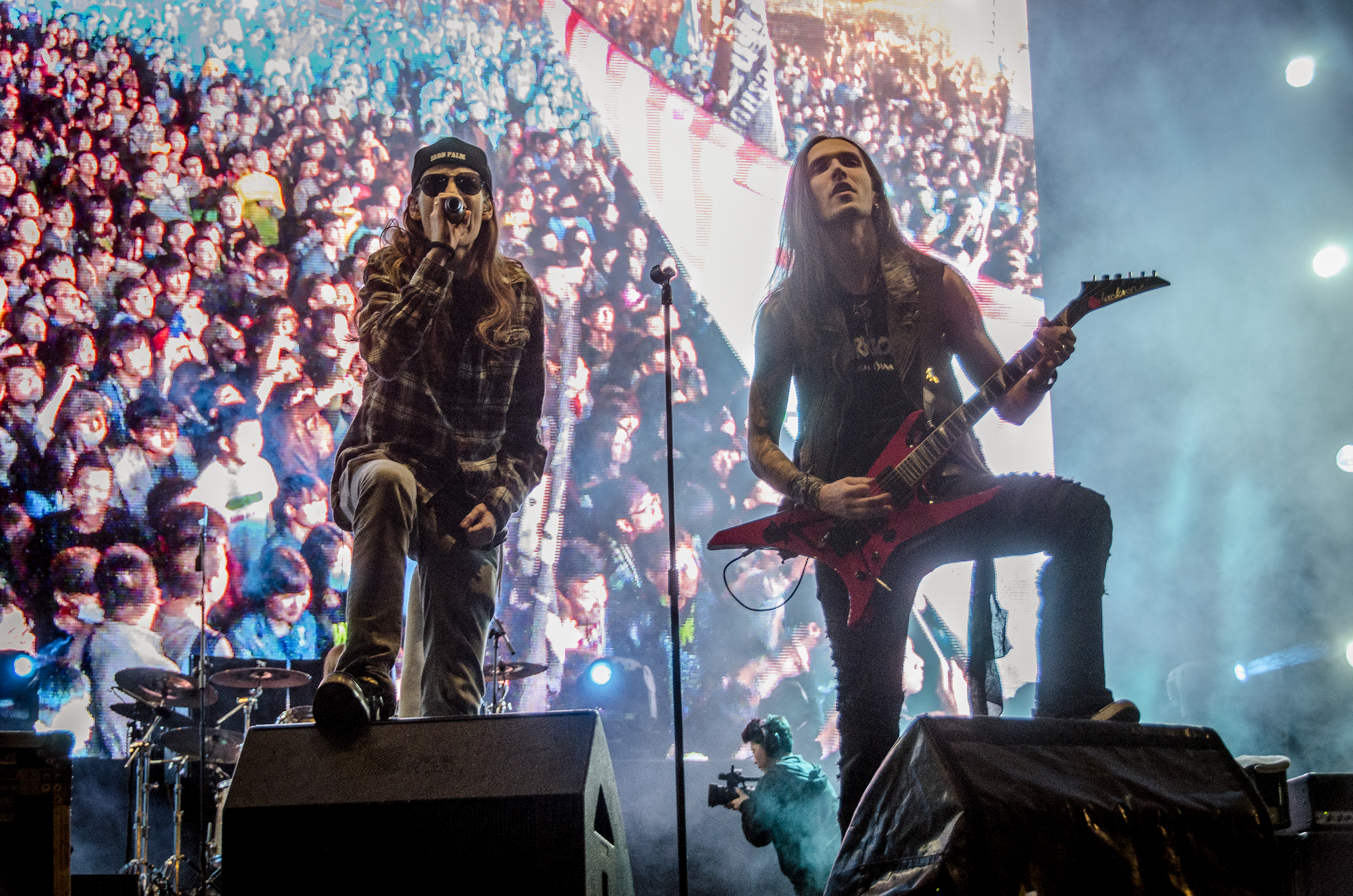

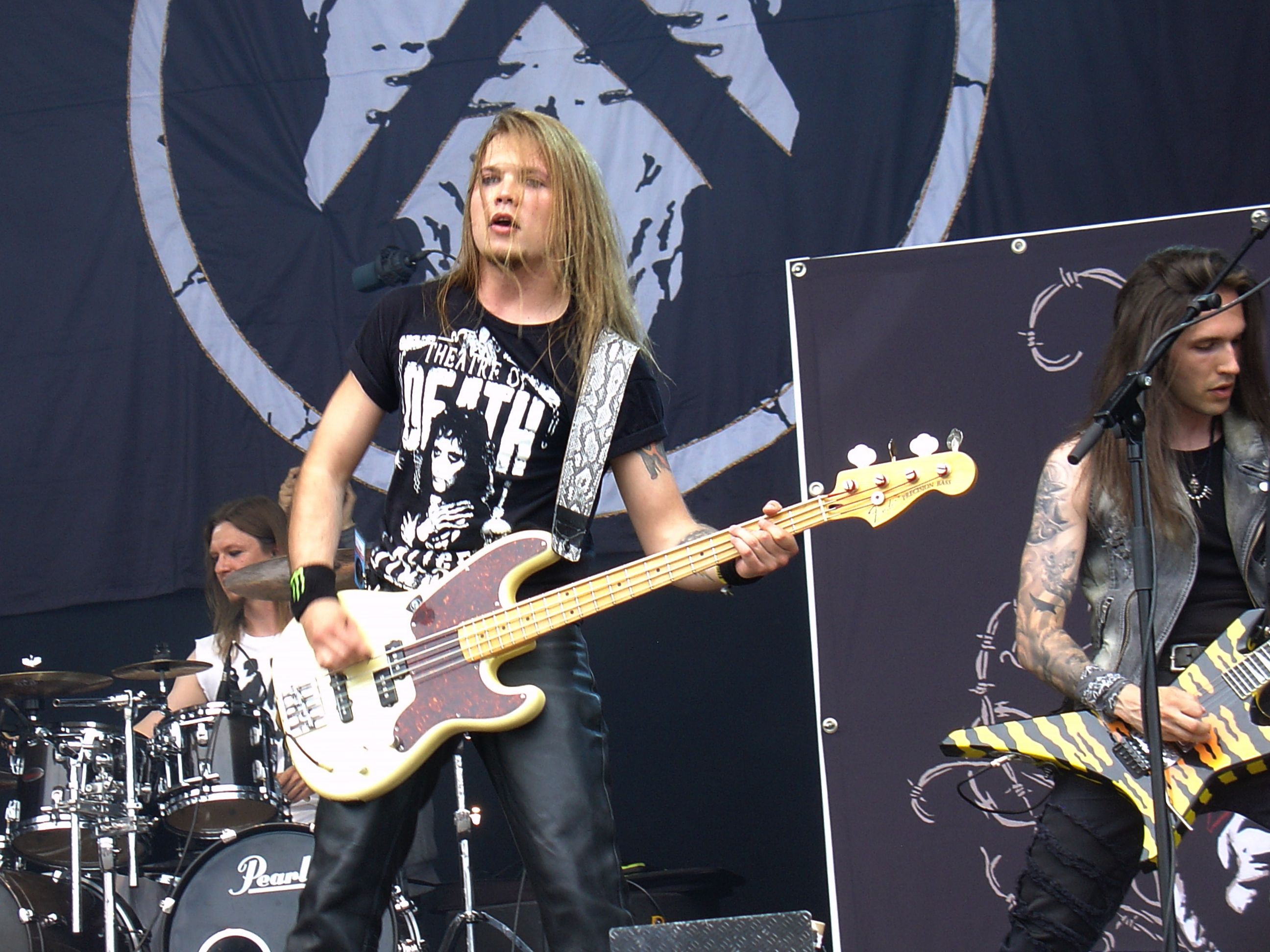

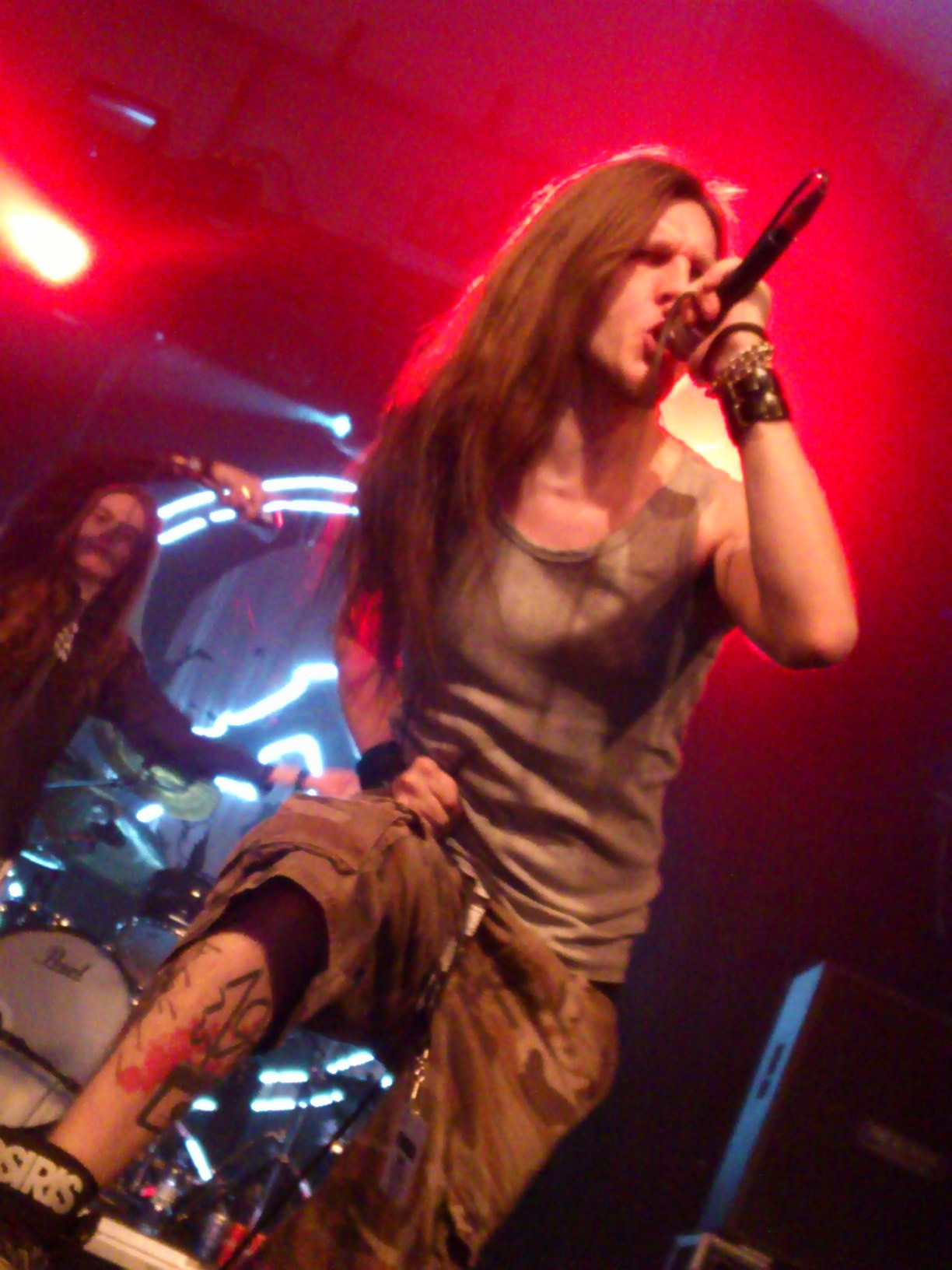

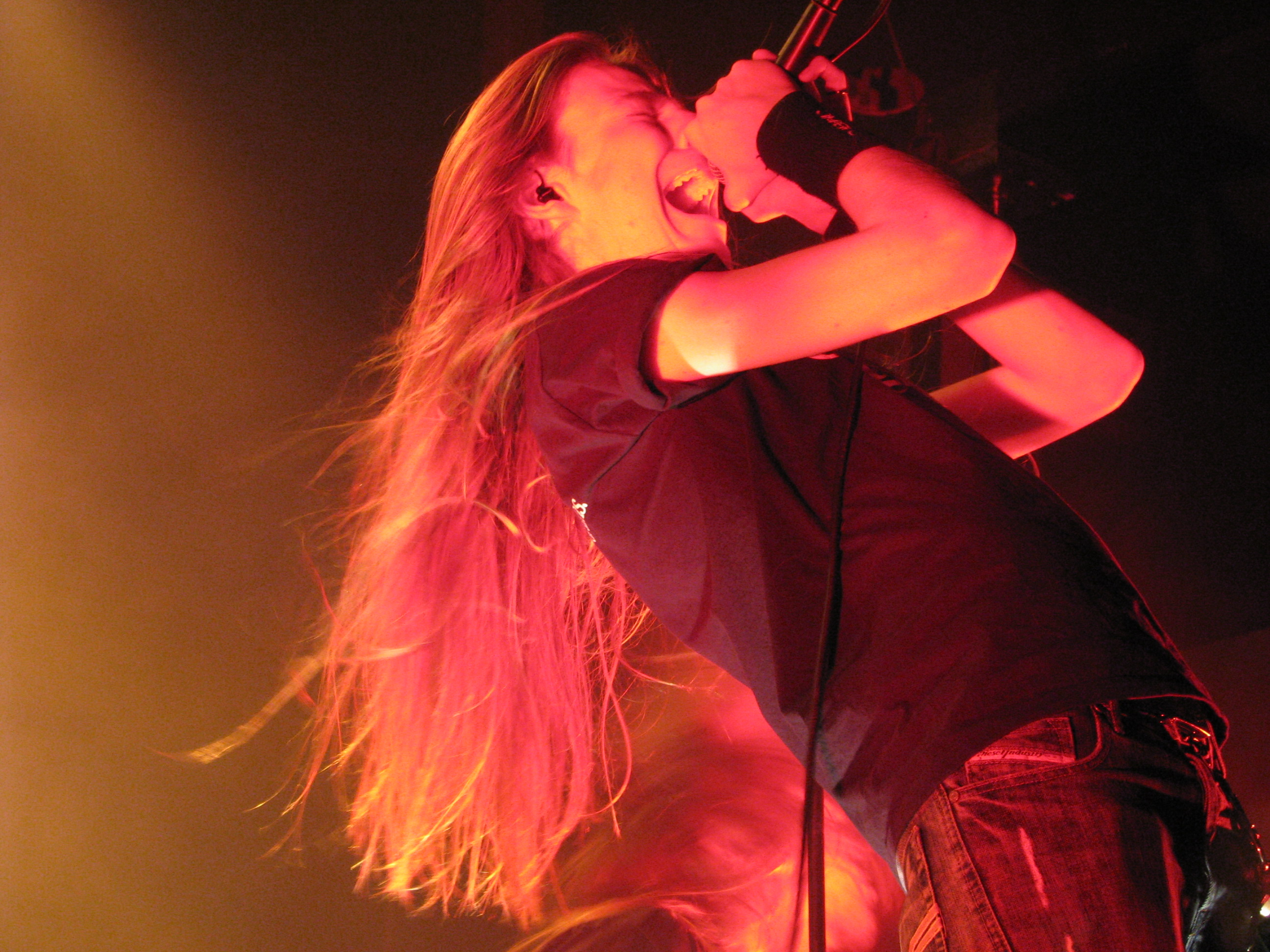

Current lineup

- Ben Varon – guitar (1997–2017, 2024–present)
- Juhana Karlsson – drums (1997–2017, 2024–present)
- Silver Ots – bass (1997–2001, 2007–2008), guitar (1997–2010, 2024–present)
- Niko Kalliojärvi – lead vocals (2002–2008, 2015–2017, 2024–present); guitar (2015–2017)
- Erkki Silvennoinen – bass (2004–2007, 2024–present)

Former members

- Matti Pitkänen – vocals (1997–2002)
- Ville Sorvali – bass (2001–2004)
- Ari Koivunen – lead vocals (2008–2017)
- Pekka Johansson – bass (2008–2017)
- Masi Hukari – guitar, keyboards (2010–2017)

== Discography ==
Studio albums

- Wound Creations (2004), Rage of Achilles, Spinefarm
- Decrowning (2005), Spinefarm
- Reptile Ride (2007), Spinefarm
- Show Your Colors (2009), Spinefarm
- Beneath (2011), Imperial Cassette
- Fallen Leaves & Dead Sparrows (2014), Imperial Cassette
- In Sequence (2016), Imperial Cassette

Demos

- Desolation (2001)
- Demo II (2002)
- Other Flesh (2002)

Singles

- "Leave Your Dead Behind" (2007)
- "Year of the Suckerpunch" (2009)
- "Gave Up Easy" (2009)
- "Same Difference" (2011)
- "Silhouette" (2011)
- "If Not Here, Where?" (2013)
- "No Familiar Faces" (2014)
- "Rude Awakening" (2015)
- "The Next One to Go" (2016)
