= Kilpi =

Finnish heavy metal band

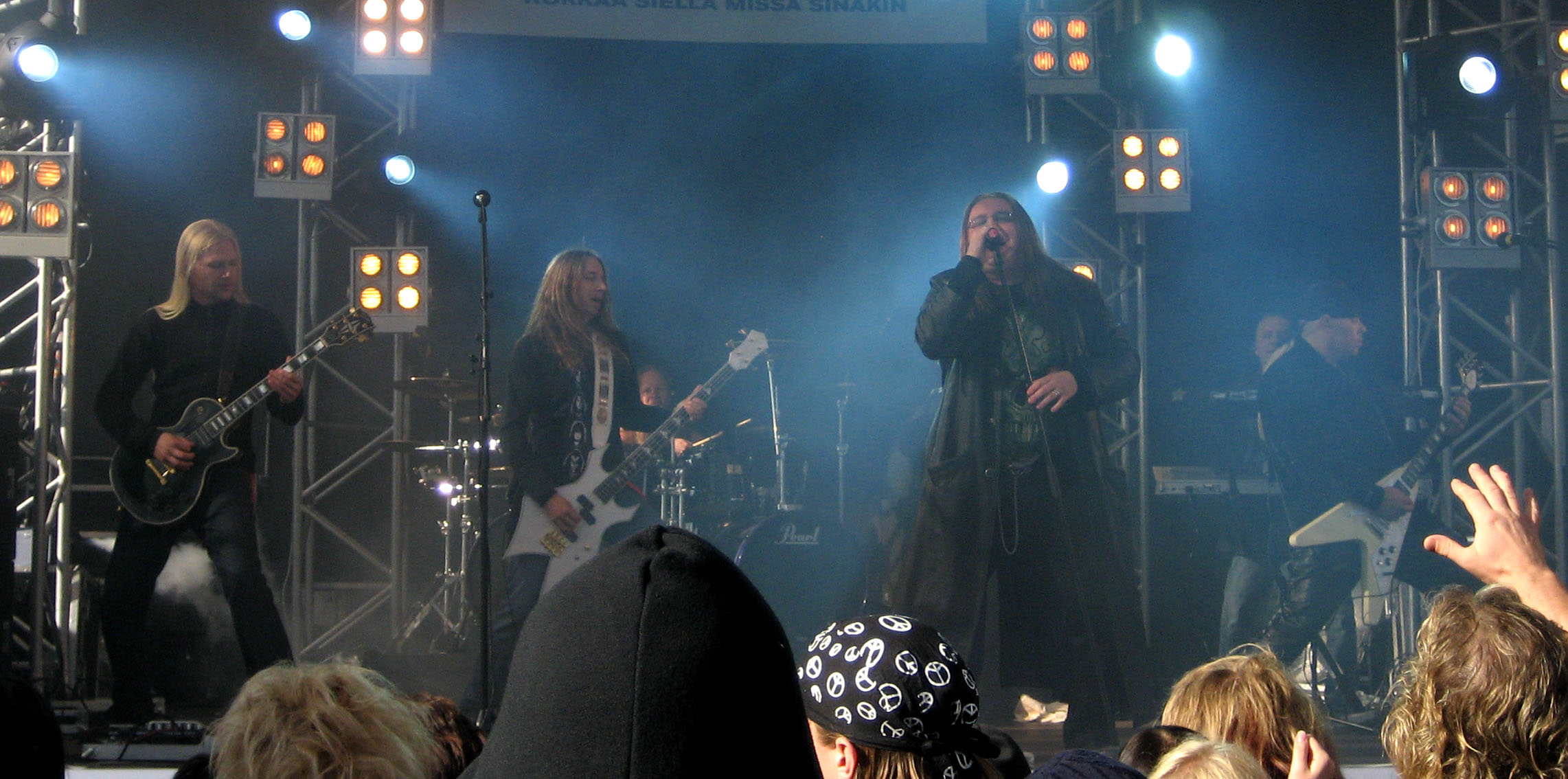
- Kilpi live at Tampere, Finland

Background information
- Origin: Turku, Finland
- Genres: Heavy metal
- Years active: 2003–present
- Members: Tapio "Taage" Laiho; Petteri "Pete" Kilpi; Aleksi "Alba" Summe; Janne Laaksonen; Juha "Kukkis" Kukkola; Jussi "Juzzy" Kattelus
- Past members: Janne Karttila
- Website: kilpi.com

Kilpi is a Finnish heavy metal band, singing in Finnish.

== History ==
"Kilpi" means shield in Finnish. It is the guitarist and band creator's last name, Petteri Kilpi. The band's first album, Sähkönsinistä Sinfoniaa, was released on May 28, 2003, some months after their first single, "Nerokasta Ikävää". On September 29, 2004, they released their second album, II Taso. In 2006 they released the album Kaaoksen Kuningas, and two of its songs, "Toinen Minä" and "Katharsis" were proposed to Eurovision Song Contest 2006. The band lost out to Lordi, finishing sixth overall in the Finnish televoting with the song "Toinen Minä". The band's first live-album Kaaos-Live was released in 2007. The band's vocalist, Taage Laiho, was a member of the Finnish band Altaria.

== Discography ==
- Sähkönsinistä Sinfoniaa (2003)
- II Taso (2004)
- Kaaoksen Kuningas (2006)
- Kaaos-Live (2007)
- IV (2008)
- Pirun Merta (2009)
- Juggernautti (2015)

=== Singles ===
- Nerokasta Ikävää (2003)
- Villin vaaran kosto (2003)
- Pahalle et käännä selkää (2003)
- Sielut iskee tulta (2004)
- Eilinen (2004)
- Varjoista valoihin (2004)
- Ihminen (2006)
- Laske kuolleet ja rukoile (2006)
- Kaaoksen Kuningas (2006)
- Katharsis (2007)
- Sisäinen Vihollinen (2008)
- Tuli, Vesi, Ilma ja Maa (2008)
- Kunnes Kuolema Meidät Erottaa (2008)
- Viinapiru (2009)
- Käännetään maailma (2010)
- Lautta (2012)
- Rakkaus vapauttaa (2012)
- Juggernautti (2015)
- Kasikus (2017)
- Taiteilija (2018)
