= Tuska Open Air Metal Festival =

Finnish heavy metal music festival

Coordinates: 60°11′10.91″N 24°58′19.02″E

Tuska Festival
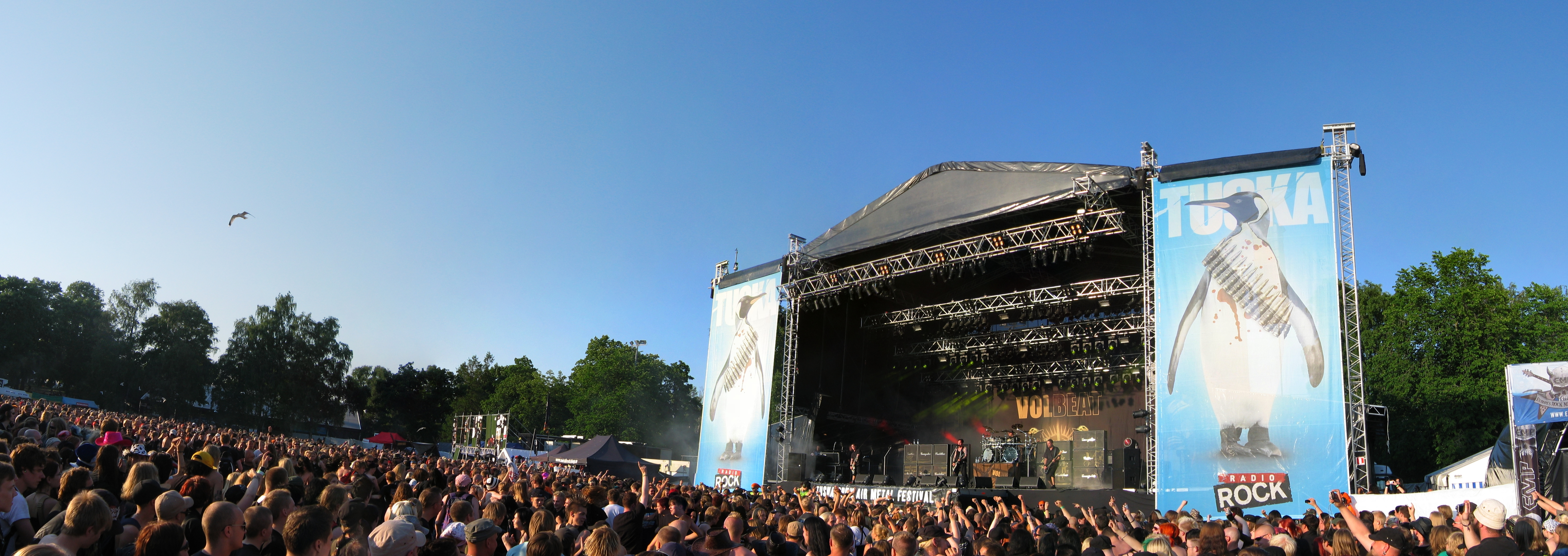
- Genre: Heavy metal, extreme metal
- Dates: June, July
- Locations: Kalasatama, Sörnäinen, Helsinki, Finland
- Years active: 1998–present
- Founders: Juhani Merimaa
- Website: Official website

Tuska Festival, (previously Tuska Open Air Metal Festival), commonly shortened to Tuska (Finnish: pain, agony), is a Finnish heavy metal festival taking place annually in Helsinki. The first Tuska took place in 1998 and the festival has since grown larger every year. The location of the festival was in Kaisaniemi park in the middle of the city from 2001 to 2010. However, since 2011, Tuska has taken place at the Suvilahti event field in the Kalasatama neighbourhood of the Sörnäinen district. The festival dates have always been in either June or July.

In recent years the attendance has grown and the festival has drawn up to 63,000 people in 2023. In 2006, the festival was almost sold out and over a combined three-day total of 33,000 attendees arrived to watch 32 artists, including for example Anathema, Celtic Frost, Opeth, Sodom, Venom, and Finland's own Amorphis and Sonata Arctica.

In 2026 there were four stages named Karhu Main Stage, Radio City Stage, Nordic Energy Stage and KVLT Stage.

== Artists by year ==
Headliners are shown in bold.

=== 1998 ===
Am I Blood, Babylon Whores, Barathrum, Gandalf, Gorgoroth, Impaled Nazarene, Timo Rautiainen & Trio Niskalaukaus and others.

=== 1999 ===
...And Oceans, Amorphis, Barathrum, Dark Tranquillity, Gandalf, Lullacry, Nightwish, Painflow, Sentenced, Tarot, The 69 Eyes, Throne of Chaos, Timo Rautiainen & Trio Niskalaukaus, Two Witches and others.

=== 2000 ===
Audience: 5,000+

Babylon Whores, Children of Bodom, Diablo, Eternal Tears of Sorrow, Finntroll, Gamma Ray, Impaled Nazarene, Lullacry, Metal Gods, Nightwish, Pain, Satyricon, Sinergy, Stone, Terveet Kädet, The Black League, The Crown, Timo Rautiainen & Trio Niskalaukaus, To/Die/For

=== 2001 ===
Audience: ca. 10,000

Amon Amarth, Amorphis, Drive, Eläkeläiset, Finntroll, Gandalf, Headplate, Impaled Nazarene, In Flames, Katatonia, Kotiteollisuus, Rhapsody of Fire, Rotten Sound, Stratovarius, The 69 Eyes, Timo Rautiainen & Trio Niskalaukaus, Transport League, United, Yearning and others

=== 2002 ===
Audience: 15,000 (sold out)

Ajattara, Blake, Bruce Dickinson, Diablo, Demigod, Ensiferum, Impaled Nazarene, Machine Head, Maj Karman Kauniit Kuvat, Marduk, Moonsorrow, Mustasch, Nightwish, Sara, Sentenced, Sonata Arctica, Suburban Tribe, The Crown, Timo Rautiainen & Trio Niskalaukaus and others

=== 2003 ===
Audience: ca. 16,500

Amorphis, Arch Enemy, Barathrum, Behemoth, Children Of Bodom, Edguy, Finntroll, Horna, Immortal Souls, Lordi, Lost Horizon, Lullacry, Mannhai, Ministry, Mokoma, Moonsorrow, Norther, Reverend Bizarre, Rotten Sound, Sentenced, Soulfly, Stratovarius, Tarot, The 69 Eyes, The Haunted, Thunderstone, Thyrane, Timo Rautiainen & Trio Niskalaukaus, Type O Negative and others

=== 2004 ===
Audience (a combined three-day total): ca. 30,000

Beseech, Blake, Charon, Dark Funeral, Dark Tranquillity, Death Angel, Dew-Scented, Diablo, Dio, Dismember, Drive, Ensiferum, Fear Factory, In Flames, Impaled Nazarene, Kilpi, Kotiteollisuus, Nasum, Nightwish, Machine Men, Mokoma, Sinergy, Soilwork, Sonata Arctica, Suburban Tribe, Swallow the Sun, Timo Rautiainen & Trio Niskalaukaus, Turisas, Twilightning and others

=== 2005 ===
Audience (a combined three-day total): 33,000+ (sold out)

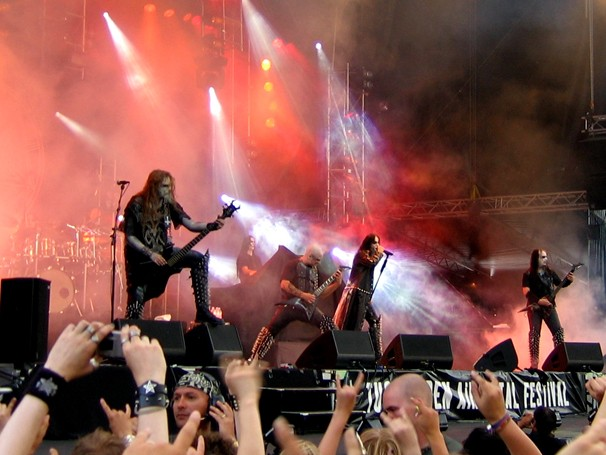
Dimmu Borgir onstage at Tuska 2005.

Accept, Ajattara, Amoral, Apocalyptica, Callisto, Children of Bodom, Deathchain, Destruction, Dimmu Borgir, Evergrey, Finntroll, Gamma Ray, Hieronymus Bosch, Lake of Tears, Mnemic, Monster Magnet, Naglfar, Pain Confessor, Paska, Primal Fear, Rotten Sound, Scarve, Sentenced, Skyclad, Stam1na, Teräsbetoni, Testament, Thunderstone, Turmion Kätilöt, Viikate, Wintersun and others

=== 2006 ===
Audience (a combined three-day total): ca. 33,000

Amorphis, Anathema, Arch Enemy, Burst, Celtic Frost, Deathstars, Diablo, Epica, Freedom Call, Gojira, Impaled Nazarene, Kalmah, Mendeed, Metsatöll, Mokoma, Nine, Norther, Opeth, Pain Confessor, Sodom, Sonata Arctica, Stam1na, Suburban Tribe, Swallow the Sun, Tarot, The Scourger, The Sisters Of Mercy, Timo Rautiainen, Venom, Verjnuarmu, Wintersun

=== 2007 ===
Audience (a combined three-day total): ca. 33,000

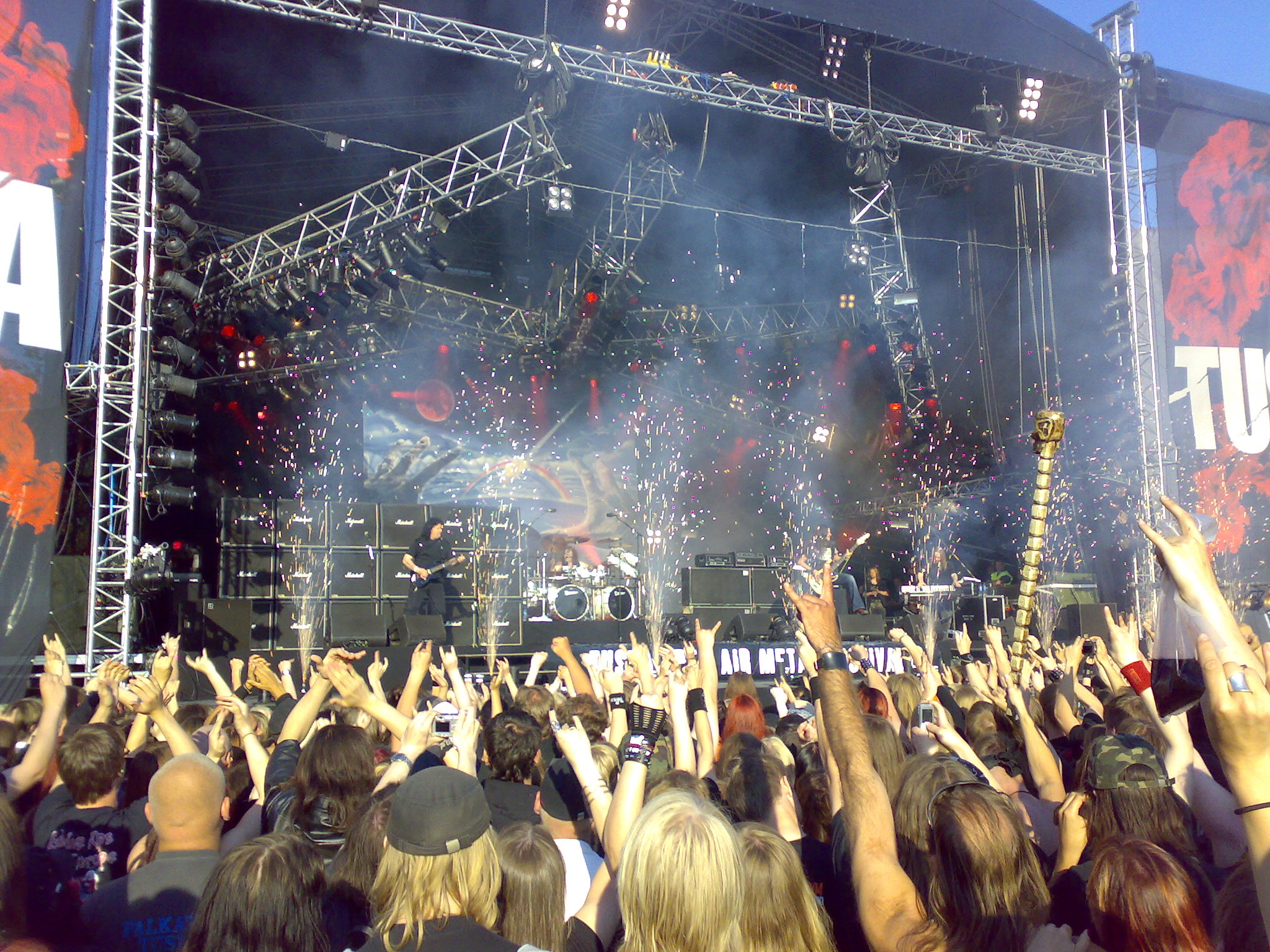
Stratovarius in 2007

Before the Dawn, Blind Guardian, Brother Firetribe, Children of Bodom, D'espairsRay, DragonForce, Emperor, Finntroll, Hatesphere, Immortal, Imperia, Insomnium, Isis, Katatonia, Legion of the Damned, Maj Karma, Mercenary, Misery Index, Moonsorrow, Moonspell, Naildown, Pain, Profane Omen, Stratovarius, Sturm Und Drang, Thunderstone, Turisas, Vader, W.A.S.P. and others

=== 2008 ===
Audience (a combined three-day total): 36,000 (sold out)

Amon Amarth, Before the Dawn, Behemoth, Carcass, Diablo, Dimmu Borgir, Dream Evil, Dying Fetus, Entombed, Fields of the Nephilim, Ghost Brigade, Kalmah, Killswitch Engage, Kiuas, Kreator, KYPCK, Mokoma, Morbid Angel, Nile, Primordial, Shade Empire, Slayer, Sonata Arctica, Sotajumala, Stam1na, The Scourger, The Sorrow, Tracedawn and Týr and others

=== 2009 ===
Audience (a combined three-day total): ca. 28,000

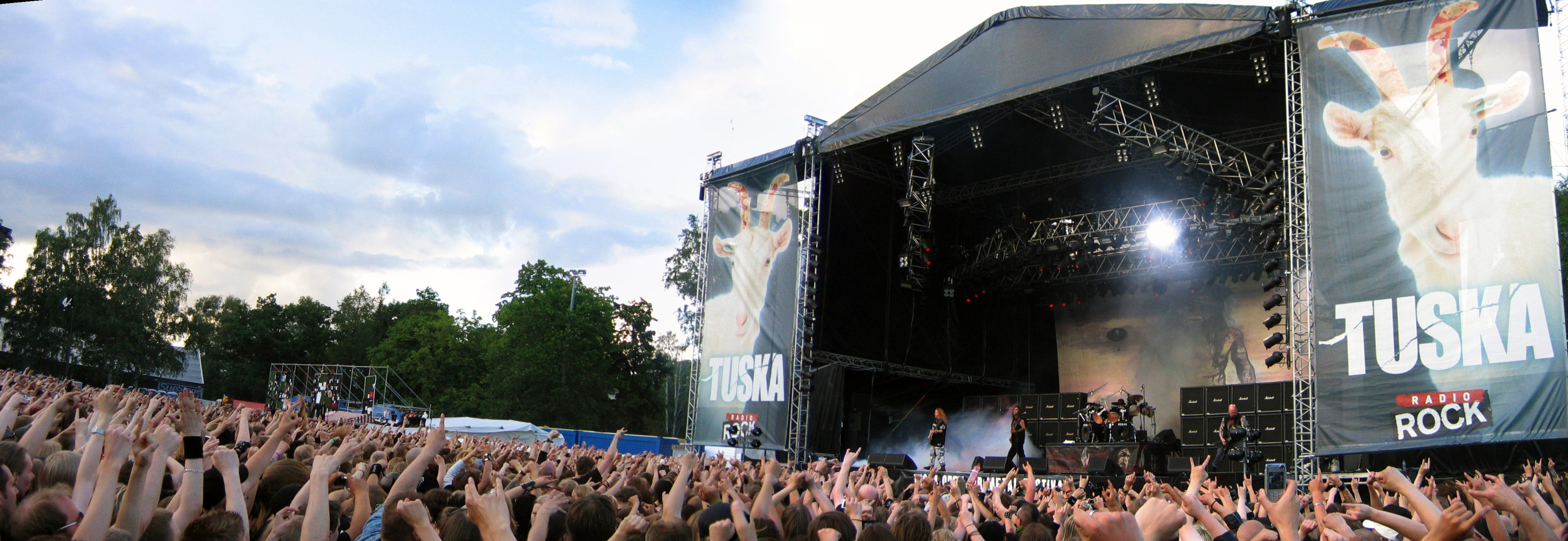
Slayer playing as the main act in 2008.

All That Remains, Amoral, Amorphis, The Black Dahlia Murder, Callisto, Dauntless, Deathchain, Eluveitie, Ensiferum, Evile, Firewind, Gama Bomb, Girugamesh, Gojira, Immortal, Jon Oliva's Pain, Legion of the Damned, Mucc, My Dying Bride, Neurosis, Parkway Drive, Pestilence, Profane Omen, Rotten Sound, Sabaton, Stam1na, Suicidal Tendencies, The Faceless, Volbeat and others

=== 2010 ===
Audience (a combined three-day total): 33,000+ (sold out)

Amatory, Barren Earth, Bloodbath, Cannibal Corpse, Devin Townsend, Devin Townsend Project, Finntroll, Holy Grail, Hypocrisy, Insomnium, Kamelot, Megadeth, Nevermore, Nile, Obituary, Overkill, Pain, Rytmihäiriö, Satyricon, Sotajumala, Swallow The Sun, Tarot, Testament, Torture Killer, Trigger The Bloodshed, Warmen, W.A.S.P., Crowbar

=== 2011 ===
Audience (a combined three-day total): 35,000+

Amon Amarth, Amorphis, At the Gates, Arch Enemy, Blind Guardian, The Devin Townsend Project, Epica, Exodus, Forbidden, Meshuggah, Morbid Angel, Katatonia, Kvelertak, Killing Joke, Electric Wizard, Enslaved, Moonsorrow, Wintersun, Witchery, Agnostic Front, Spiritual Beggars, Turisas, Impaled Nazarene, Grave, Shining, Mygrain, Church of Misery, Misery Index, Lighthouse Project, Black Breath, Tarot, Bulldozer, Hell, Omnium Gatherum, Ghost, Medeia, Rotten Sound and others

=== 2012 ===
Audience (a combined three-day total): 26 000+

Alcest, Amoral, Apocalyptica, Arcturus, Baroness, Barren Earth, Behemoth, Demigod, Edguy, Exodus, Finntroll, For the Imperium, Hatebreed, Horna, Insomnium, Jess and the Ancient Ones, Megadeth, Metsatöll, Ministry, Mokoma, Napalm Death, One Morning Left, Overkill, Profane Omen, Sabaton, Saint Vitus, Skeletonwitch, Sonata Arctica, Suicide Silence, Suidakra, Swallow the Sun, Textures, The Man-Eating Tree, Trivium, Victims, Winterwolf and others

=== 2013 ===
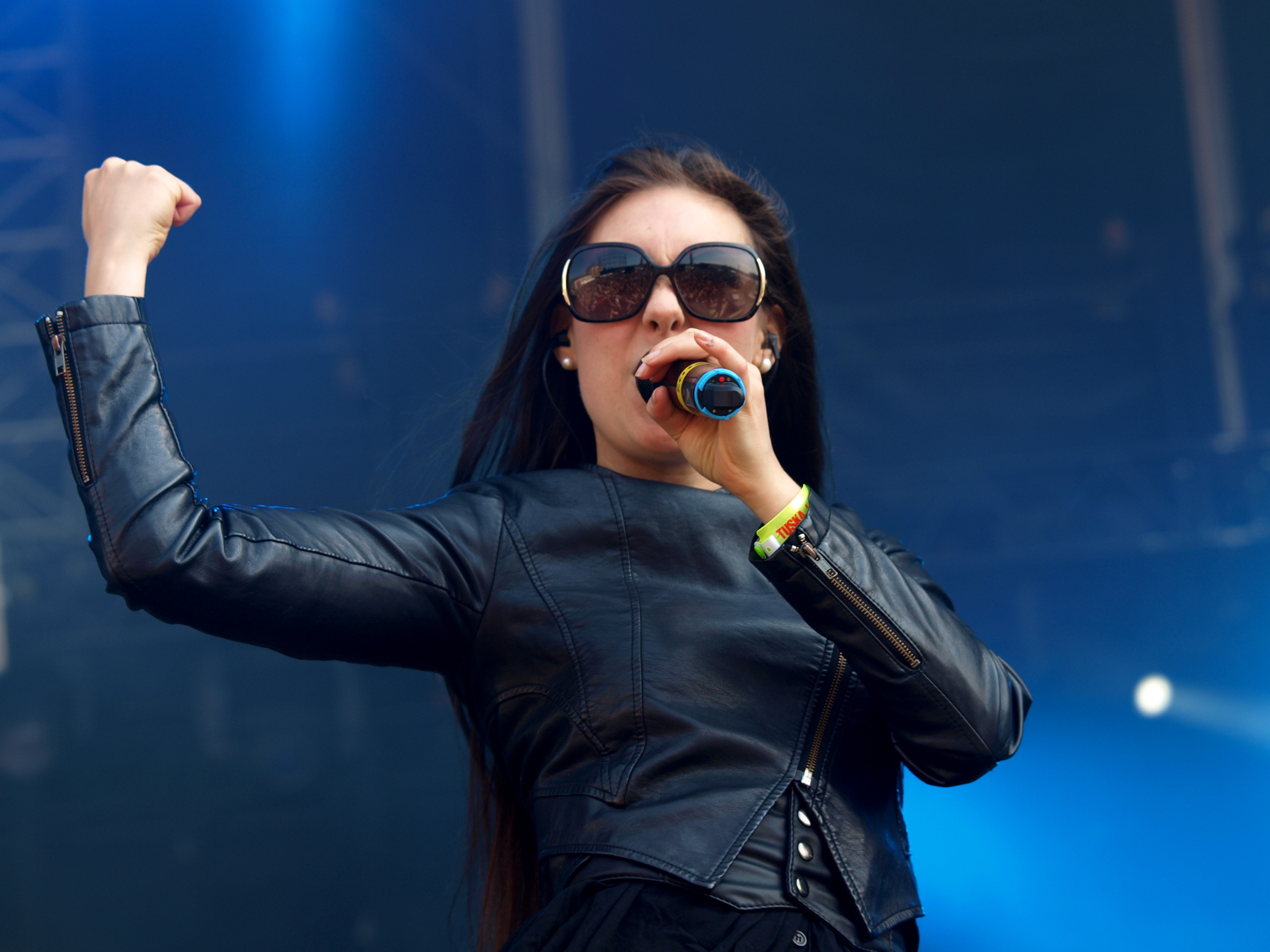
Elize Ryd of Amaranthe performing at the Tuska Open Air Metal Festival in 2013

Audience (a combined three-day total): 25,000+

Nightwish, King Diamond, Testament, Bolt Thrower, Kreator, Amorphis, Stam1na, Soilwork, Stratovarius, Wintersun, Amaranthe, Ihsahn, Leprous, Battle Beast, TesseracT, Von, Urfaust, We Butter the Bread with Butter, Deathchain, Black City, Abhorrence, Torture Killer, Dreamtale, Hateform, Santa Cruz and others

=== 2014 ===
Audience (a combined three-day total): 24,000+

Emperor, Anthrax, Dimmu Borgir, Children of Bodom, Satyricon, Bring Me the Horizon, Neurosis, Carcass, Stone, Shining, Turmion Kätilöt, Insomnium, Ensiferum, Orphaned Land, Metal Church, Poisonblack, We Came as Romans, Battle Beast, Tankard, Hamferð, Powerwolf, Santa Cruz, Beastmilk, Amoral, Speedtrap, Cutdown, Altair, Arion and others

=== 2015 ===
Audience (a combined three-day total): 25,000+

Alice Cooper, Sabaton, In Flames, Lamb Of God, Opeth, Abbath, Exodus, Amorphis, Stratovarius, Mokoma, Architects, Loudness, Bloodbath, Blues Pills, Ghost Brigade, Ne Obliviscaris, Einherjer, Warmen, The Sirens, Sotajumala, Krokodil, Bombus, Enforcer and others

=== 2016 ===
Audience (a combined three-day total): 28,000+

Ghost, Avantasia, Children of Bodom, Testament, Anthrax, Behemoth, Katatonia, Stam1na, Kvelertak, Hatebreed, Turmion Kätilöt, Gojira, With the Dead, Lordi, Swallow the Sun, Cain's Offering, Diablo, Primordial, Thunderstone, Tsjuder, Cattle Decapitation, Obscura, Havok, Nervosa, Myrkur, Delain, Mantar, Beast in Black, Jess and the Ancient Ones and others

=== 2017 ===
20th anniversary broke Tuska's all time visitor record until 2019, at 37,000 over three festival days.

HIM, Sabaton, Mastodon, Apocalyptica plays Metallica by four cellos, Devin Townsend Project, Suicidal Tendencies, Amorphis, Mayhem, Triptykon, Timo Rautiainen & Trio Niskalaukaus, Soilwork, Sonata Arctica, Dirkschneider, Wintersun, Baroness, Electric Wizard, Mokoma, Insomnium, Lost Society, Anneke Van Giersbergen's Vuur, Brujeria, Rotten Sound, Avatarium, Battle Beast, Brother Firetribe, Jimsonweed, Impaled Nazarene, Barathrum, Baptism, Oranssi Pazuzu, Trap Them, LIK, The Raven Age, Kohti Tuhoa, Ratface, Pekko Käppi & KHHL, Huora, Amendfoil, Demonztrator, Fear Of Domination, Mind Riot, Sleep of Monsters, Throes of Dawn, Paara, Alabama Kush

=== 2018 ===
Audience (a combined three-day total): 34,000+

Body Count ft. Ice-T, Gojira, Parkway Drive, Kreator, Europe, Dead Cross, Arch Enemy, Emperor, Meshuggah, At The Gates, Clutch, Timo Rautiainen & Trio Niskalaukaus, Crowbar, Mokoma, Turmion Kätilöt, Ihsahn, Hallatar, Moonsorrow, Leprous, Carpenter Brut, The 69 Eyes, Beast in Black, Bombus, Grave Pleasures, Lauri Porra Flyover Ensemble, Tribulation, Shiraz Lane, Stick To Your Guns, Charm The Fury, Mantar, Arion, Foreseen, Red Death, Feastem, Hard Action, Hexhammer, Galactic Empire, Gloomy Grim, Crimfall, Blind Channel, Baest, Temple Balls, Black Royal, Six Inch, Keoma, Tyrantti

=== 2019 ===
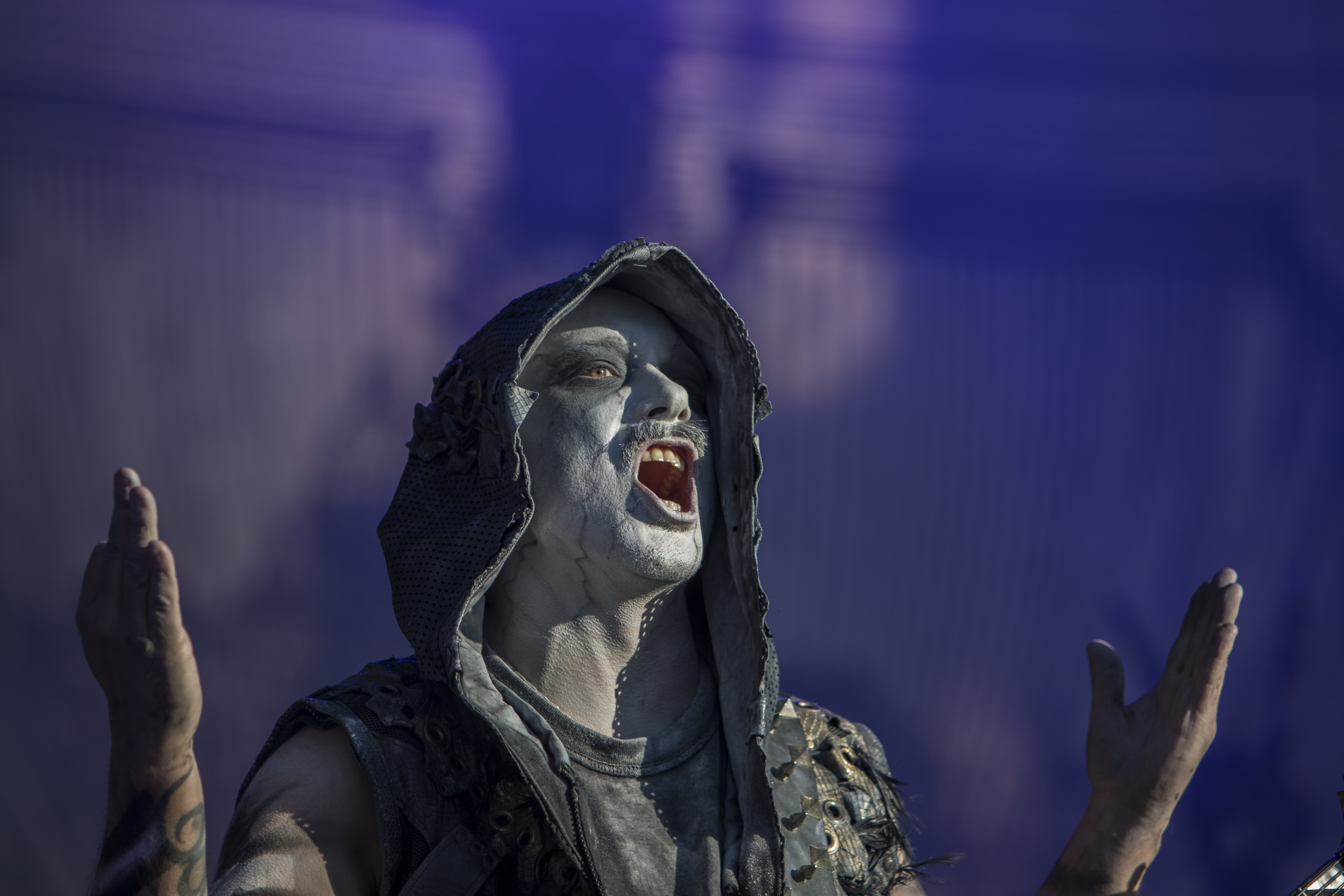
Dimmu Borgir at the 2019 Tuska Open Air Metal Festival

22nd Tuska Festival took place from 28 to 30 June 2019.

Record audience until 2022 (combined three days total): 43,000+.
Slayer, Amorphis, The Hellacopters, Anthrax, Opeth, Behemoth, Dimmu Borgir, Halestorm, Stam1na, Kvelertak, Cult of Luna, Frank Carter & The Rattlesnakes, Sick of It All, Heilung, Battle Beast, Swallow the Sun, Marko Hietala, Anneke van Giersbergen, Loudness, Lost Society, Delain, Power Trip, Jinjer, Maj Karma, Rytmihäiriö, Arion, Leverage, Alien Weaponry, Medeia, Fear of Domination, Wheel, Dark Sarah, Warkings, Visions of Atlantis, Brymir, De Lirium's Order, Goatburner, Mustan Kuun Lapset, I Revolt, Kaiser, Pahan Ikoni, Palehorse, Sata Kaskelottia, Balance Breach, Wake Up Frankie, Hevisaurus, Sharon Rircharson, JP Ahonen, Mika Jussila, Valnoir, Ester Segarra and Scar.fi.

=== 2020 ===
Tuska 2020 was cancelled on 23 April due to the Coronavirus epidemic after the Finnish government forbid events larger than 500 people until the end of July 2020. Bands that were announced prior to the cancellation included Korn, Faith No More, Deftones, Gojira, Symphony X, Devin Townsend, Bodom after Midnight, Insomnium, Amon Amarth and Vltimas.

=== 2021 ===
Tuska 2021 was cancelled on 16 April due to the Coronavirus situation and its effects.

=== 2022 ===
23rd Tuska Festival took place from 1 to 3 July 2022.

Record audience until 2023 (combined three days total): 49,000+.

Korn, Mercyful Fate, Deftones, Carcass, Amorphis, Kreator, Devin Townsend, Heilung, Stam1na, Beast in Black, Stratovarius, Northern Kings, Jinjer, Ensiferum, Baroness, Eluveitie, Insomnium, Soilwork, Lost Society, Blind Channel, Reckless Love, Sonata Arctica, Perturbator, Red Fang, Gloryhammer, Joe Lynn Turner, Elder, High on Fire, Oranssi Pazuzu, VOLA, The Night Flight Orchestra, Vltimas, Wheel, Omnium Gatherum, Bloodred Hourglass, Lähiöbotox, Shape of Despair, Church of the Dead, Marianas Rest, Humavoid, Detset, Polymoon, One Morning Left, Verikalpa, Enphin, Abstrakt, The Rivet, Shereign, Amoth, Astralion, Denominate, King Satan, Cryptic Hatred, The Mist from the Mountains, Rebellix, Edge of Haze, Atlas, Numento and Sacred Dimension.

=== 2023 ===
24th Tuska Festival took place from 30 June to 2 July 2023.

Record audience until 2026 (combined three days total): 63 000 (sold out).

Ghost, Gojira, Ville Valo (VV), Arch Enemy, In Flames, The Hu, Electric Callboy, Motionless in White, Jinjer, Clutch, Lorna Shore, While She Sleeps, Marko Hietala, Avatar, Glenn Hughes, Haken, Delain, Urne, Turmion Kätilöt, Mokoma, Lost Society, Memoriam, Butcher Babies, Swallow the Sun, Diablo, Finntroll, Dance with the Dead, Xysma, Imperial Triumphant, Imminence, Blood Incantation, Orbit Culture, Vended, Brymir, A.A. Williams, Foreseen, Smackbound, Silver Bullet, Vermilia, Galvanizer, Solothus, ...And Oceans, Dreamtale, Dirt, Miseria Ultima, Sepulchral Curse, Bob Malmström, Ashen Tomb, Nakkeknaekker, Vansidian, Kouta, Kúru, Nervebreak, Angles Mortis, Slash the Smile and Irrational Cause.

=== 2024 ===
25th Tuska Festival took place from 28 to 30 June 2024.

Audience (combined three days total): 60 000.

Pendulum, Bring Me the Horizon, Parkway Drive, Dimmu Borgir, Kerry King, Amorphis, Opeth, Lost Society, Stam1na, Alestorm, Tarot, Sonata Arctica, Stratovarius, Suburban Tribe, Turmion Kätilöt, Health, Zeal & Ardor, Annisokay, Lord of the Lost, Solence, Beyond the Black, VOLA, Eivør, Riverside, Bloodred Hourglass, Warmen, Bury Tomorrow, Ankor, Ghostkid, Make Them Suffer, Elvenking, Infected Rain, Fixation, Brothers of Metal, Devourment, Kaunis Kuolematon, Rytmihäiriö, The Abbey, St. Aurora, Assemble the Chariots, I Am Your God, I Am The Night, Luna Kills, Sadistic Drive, Swansong, Krypta, Suotana, Prestige, Putro in Black, Malformed, Sick Urge, Dome Runner, Shereign, Agarwaen, Kollectivist, My Misery, Metal Riot, Satra, SulfuriS and Terromania.

=== 2025 ===
26th Tuska Festival took place from 27 to 29 June 2025.

Audience (combined three days total): 60 000.

In Flames, Powerwolf, Lorna Shore, Electric Callboy, Motionless in White, Slaughter to Prevail, Cradle of Filth, Apocalyptica, Nothing More, Knocked Loose, Orbit Culture, Mokoma, Turmion Kätilöt, Battle Beast, DragonForce, The Halo Effect, Kim Dracula, Tarja, Marko Hietala, Alcest, Insomnium, Wind Rose, Polaris, Whitechapel, Imminence, Bambie Thug, Skynd, Korpiklaani, Timo Rautiainen & Trio Niskalaukaus, Cemetery Skyline, Thrown, Charlotte Wessels, Endstand, Blood Command, Jiluka, Cyan Kicks, Eihwar, Tyrantti, Arion, Havukruunu, Horizon Ignited, Bokassa, Jarkko Martikainen, Octoploid, Cryptic Hatred, Enemies Everywhere, Intrepid, Royal Sorrow, Sepulchral Curse, Countless Goodbyes, Sorretun Voima, The Vantages, Noiduin, Vähäkyrö Drive-By, Kaisa Pylkkänen, Call from Abyss, DOL, Falling from Grace, Bisa, Distant Stares, Nameles, Ashes in the Fall and Lights to Remain.

=== 2026 ===
27th Tuska Festival took place from 26 to 28 June 2026.

Record audience (combined three days total): 66 000.

Megadeth, Bring Me the Horizon, Bad Omens, Trivium, Amorphis, P.O.D., Pain, D-A-D, Tarot, Stam1na, The Plot in You, Blood Incantation, Queensrÿche, Lost Society, Skindred, Kublai Khan TX, Malevolence, Soilwork, Paleface Swiss, Rivers of Nihil, Ensiferum, Bloodred Hourglass, Hokka, Gatecreeper, Loudness, Swallow the Sun, Warmen, Caskets, The Funeral Portrait, Sara, The Browning, Return to Dust, Aurorawave, Majestica, Dogma, Melrose Avenue, Balance Breach, Awake Again, Slope, Sonic Punter, Neckbreakker, Allt, Atlas, Survivors Zero, Kallomäki, Omnivortex, Kneel Before the Death, 802, Nenerchy, Lunarsea, Kajos, Rukous, Necrotic Ooze, Ashes of Perishing, JellyDixx, Scythe of Sorrow, Despiser, Dying Reverie, Shere Khan, NITRIK and Suicide Chain.

=== 2027 ===
28th Tuska Festival takes place from 2 to 4 July 2027.

Judas Priest, Lorna Shore, Children of Bodom, I Prevail, Orbit Culture, Heaven Shall Burn, Turmion Kätilöt, Kanonenfieber, The Devil Wears Prada, Stratovarius, Paradise Lost, Fit for a King, Danko Jones, Smash into Pieces, Guilt Trip, Speed, Green Lung, Celestial Sanctuary, Tukkanuotta, Fox Lake, Gaerea, Atlas, Avralize, Conan, The Baboon Show, Cenobia, Split Dogs, Sinizter, SUN and others.

== See also ==
- Sauna Open Air Metal Festival
