= Sauna Open Air Metal Festival =

Music festival in Tampere, Finland

Coordinates: 61°29′24″N 23°45′15″E

Sauna Open Air
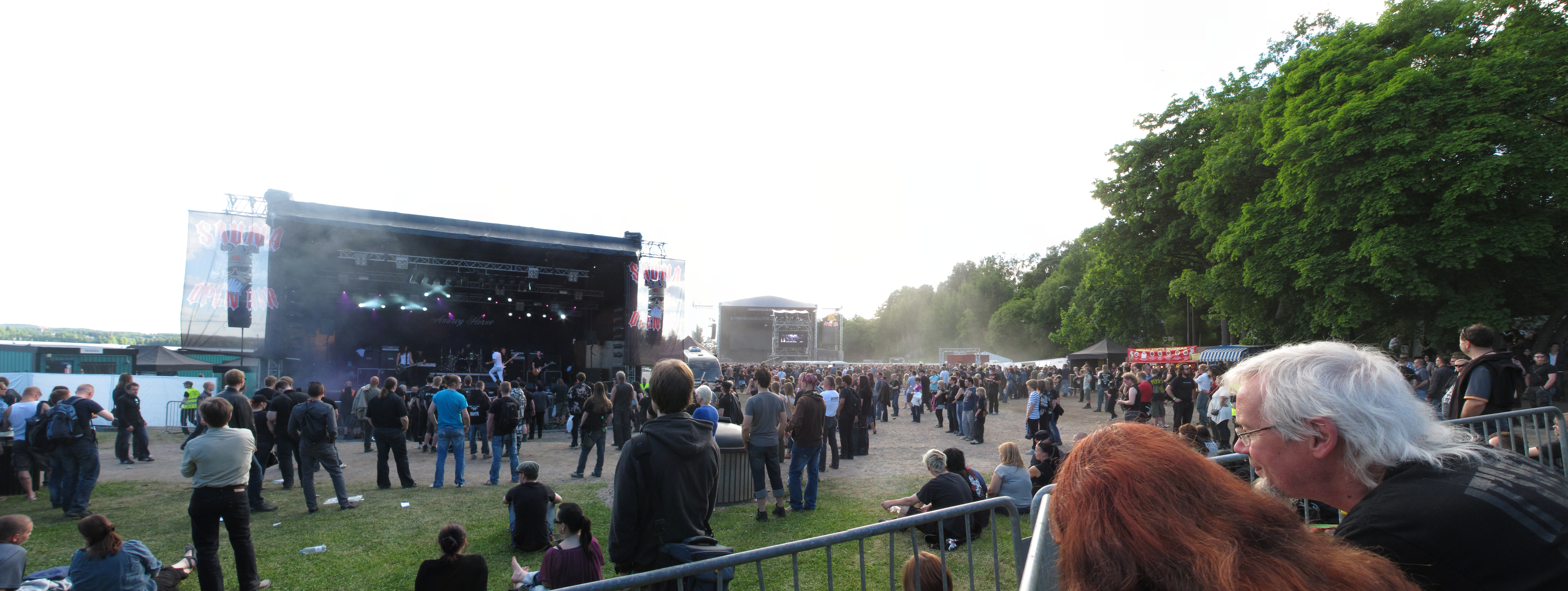
- Sauna Open Air 2010
- Genre: Heavy metal
- Dates: June
- Locations: Tampere, Finland
- Years active: 2004–2013; 2019–2022
- Website: www.saunaopenair.fi

Sauna Open Air Metal Festival, shortly Sauna Open Air or just Sauna, was one of the largest music festivals dedicated only to heavy metal and related styles of rock music in the Nordic countries. It was first arranged in 2004 and takes place in the Ratinanniemi park in Tampere, Finland. From 8 June to 10 June 2006, over 20,000 people arrived to watch such bands as Cradle of Filth, Finntroll, Iggy & The Stooges, Lordi, Twisted Sister and W.A.S.P.

In 2007, the festival gathered an audience of over 22,000 people, at the time a record audience for the Sauna festival. This record was beaten in 2011, with a new record audience of 26,000.

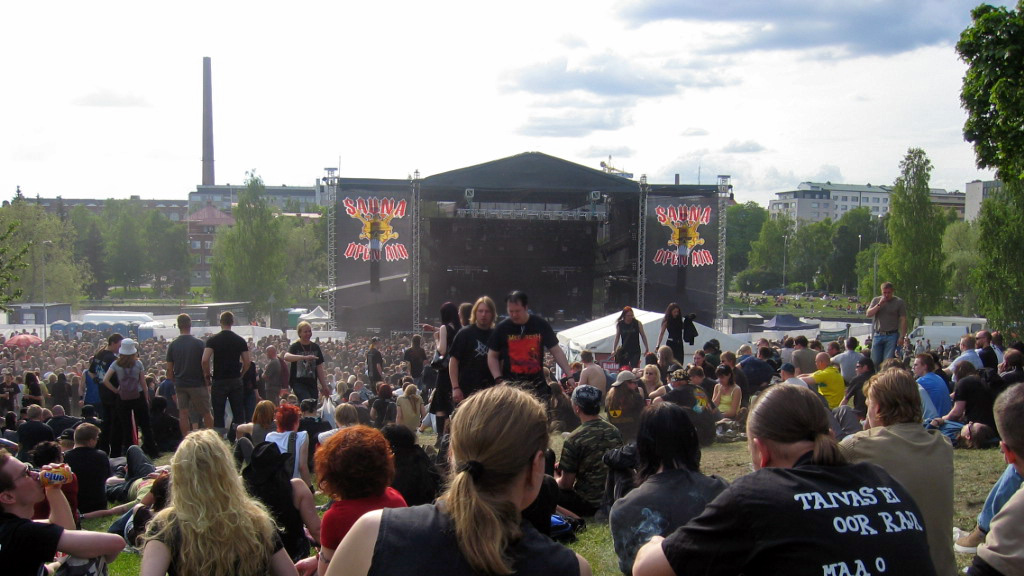
Sauna Open Air 2005

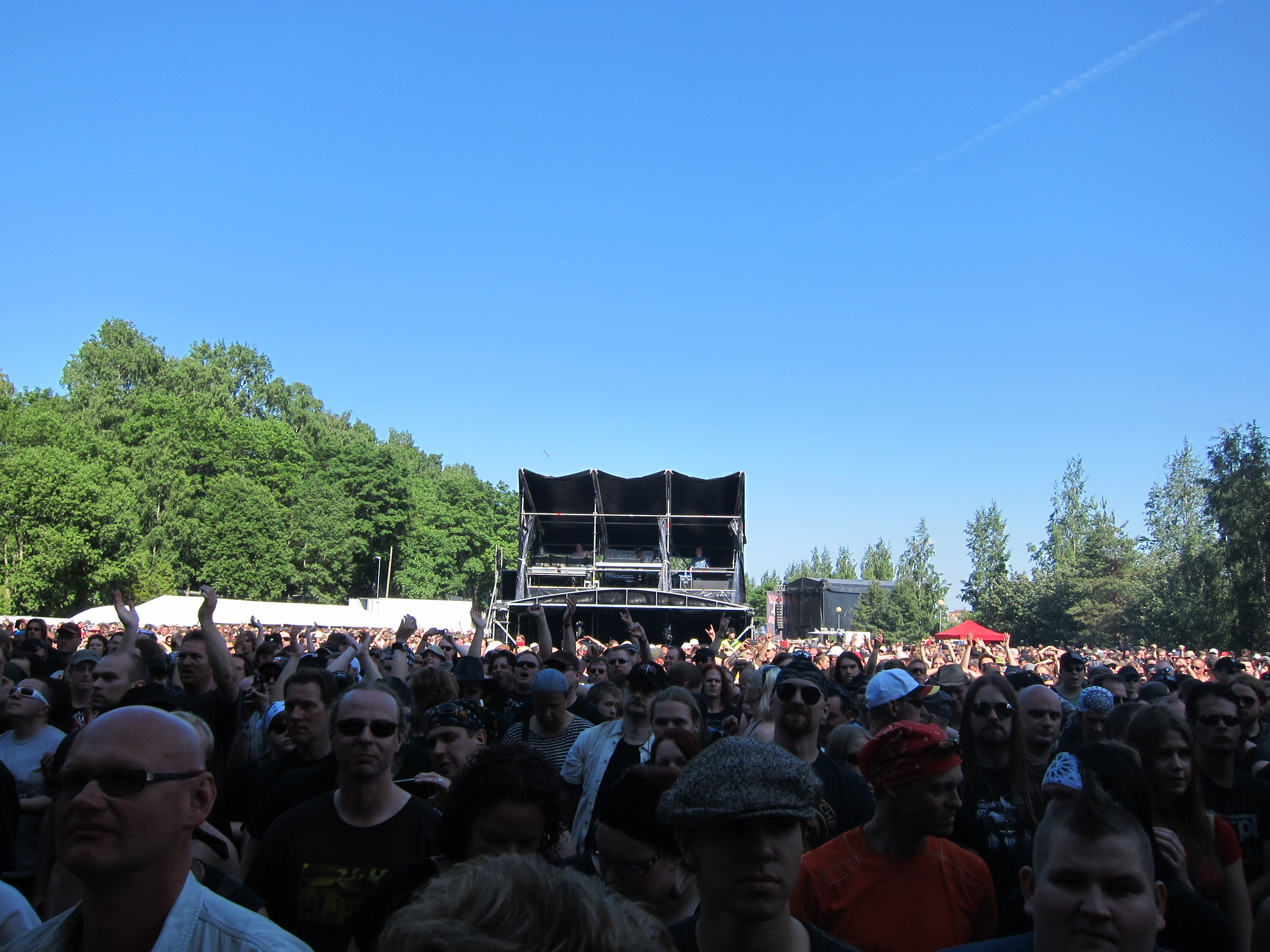
The audience during a Queensrÿche concert at the 2011 Sauna Open Air

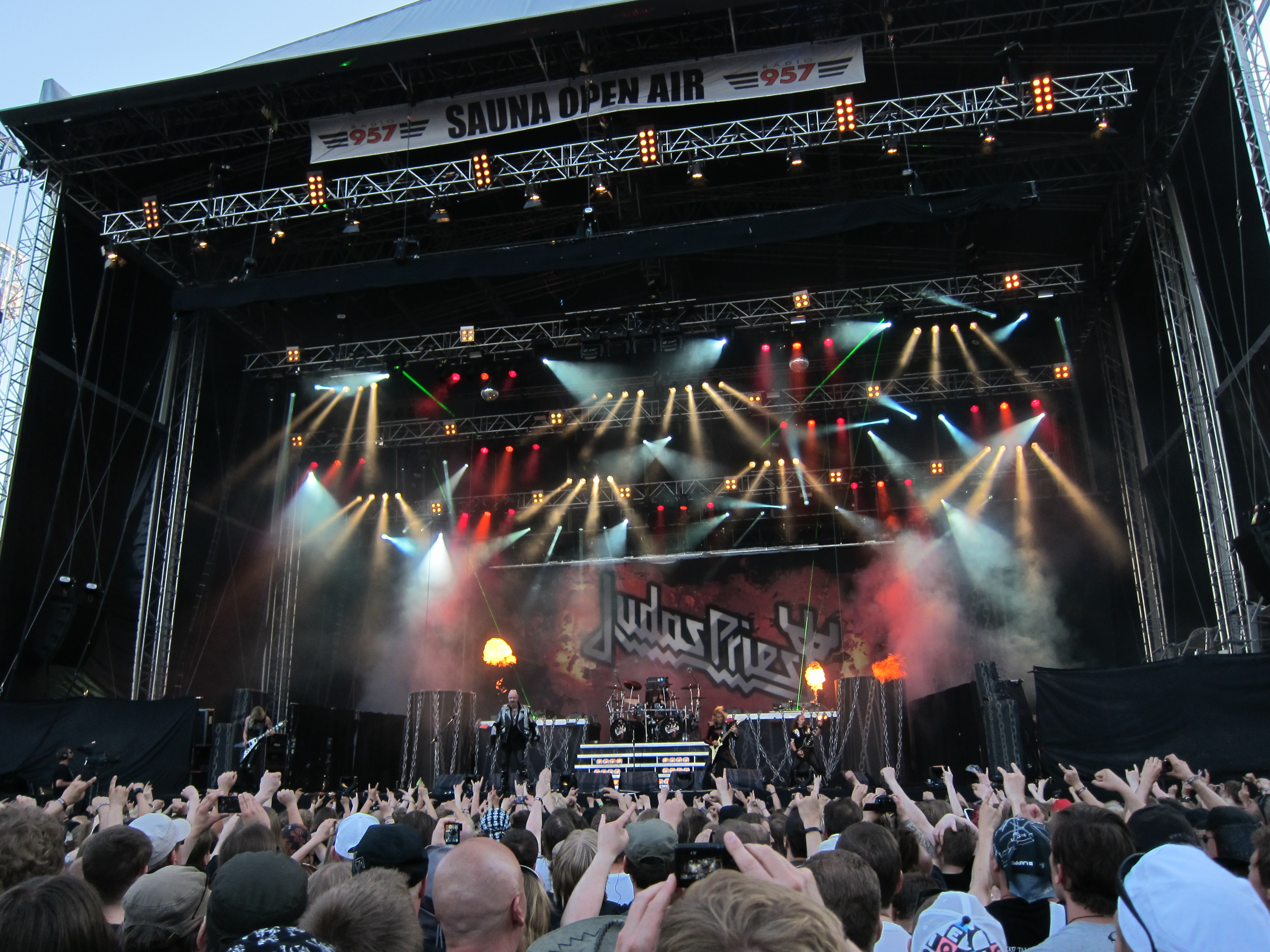
Judas Priest on stage in 2011

In 2019, the festival made a comeback after a six-year hiatus and was held in Ratinanniemi Park.

== Artists by year ==
Headliners are bolded.

=== 2004 ===
Children of Bodom, Diablo, Dreamtale, Finntroll, Helloween, Lordi, My Fate, Nightwish, Swallow the Sun, Tarot, Thunderstone, Twilightning, Underwear.

=== 2005 ===
Amoral, Deathchain, Dio, Dreamtale, Kiuas, Kotipelto, Machine Men, Megadeth, Mokoma, Moonsorrow, Norther, Pain, Roctum, Sentenced, Slayer, Sonata Arctica, Teräsbetoni.

=== 2006 ===
April, The Black League, Blake, Charon, Cradle of Filth, Diablo, Ensiferum, Finntroll, The Flaming Sideburns, Iggy & The Stooges, Kiuas, Lordi, Stam1na, Turmion Kätilöt, Twisted Sister, Verjnuarmu, W.A.S.P.

=== 2007 ===
Ari Koivunen, Dark Tranquillity, Dimmu Borgir, Entwine, Heaven and Hell, Korpiklaani, Kotipelto, Kotiteollisuus, Leverage, Los Bastardos Finlandeses, Megadeth, Pain Confessor, Poisonblack, Sabaton, Sonata Arctica, Stam1na, Swallow the Sun, Thunderstone, Timo Rautiainen, Type O Negative, Violent Storm (cancelled).

=== 2008 ===
Airbourne, Amorphis, Sebastian Bach, Graham Bonnet & Joe Lynn Turner, Children of Bodom, Diablo, Eläkeläiset, Iiwanajulma, Kiuas, KYPCK, Masterstroke, Mokoma, MoonMadness, Rytmihäiriö, Scorpions, Sonata Arctica, Stam1na, Stone, Testament, Tracedawn, When the Empire Falls, Whitesnake, Widescreen Mode.

=== 2009 ===
45 Degree Woman, Amorphis, Apocalyptica, Bullet, Deuteronomium, Duff McKagan's Loaded, Finntroll, Hardcore Superstar (cancelled), HammerFall, Kamelot, Kotiteollisuus, Medeia, Meshuggah (cancelled), Mötley Crüe, Nightwish, Omnium Gatherum, Poisonblack, Prestige, Profane Omen, Soilwork, Sparzanza, Stratovarius, Sturm und Drang, Thor, Viikate.

=== 2010 ===
Amorphis, Anvil, Audrey Horne, August Burns Red, Danzig, Death Angel, Doom Unit, Glamour of the Kill, Grave Digger, Hail!, Insomnium, Kiss, Peer Günt, Poisonblack, Ratt (cancelled), Tarot, The 69 Eyes, Sonata Arctica, Stam1na, Steel Panther, Suburban Tribe, Whitechapel.

=== 2011 ===
Judas Priest, Ozzy Osbourne, Helloween, Omnium Gatherum, Saxon, Doro, Cavalera Conspiracy, Rytmihäiriö, Mokoma, Tarot, Blake, Anthriel, Moonsorrow, Turisas, Viikate, Joey Belladonna, Dio Disciples, Queensrÿche, Accept, Battle Beast, Sparzanza

=== 2013 ===
Nightwish, Opeth, Children of Bodom, Bloodred Hourglass, Finntroll, Lost Society, Volbeat, Hardcore Superstar, Sabaton, Hatebreed, Crashdïet, Stam1na, Omnium Gatherum, Egokills, Ghost Voyage

=== 2019 ===
W.A.S.P., Amorphis, D-A-D, Santa Cruz, Marko Hietala, Mokoma, Flat Earth, Whitesnake, Europe, Sonata Arctica, Battle Beast, Skindred, Brother Firetribe, One Desire

=== 2022 ===
Bullet for My Valentine, Stam1na, Beast in Black, Alestorm, Turmion Kätilöt, Nestor, Korpiklaani, Michael Monroe, Eläkeläiset, Fear Of Domination, Negatiiviset Nuoret, Five Finger Death Punch, Battle Beast, Avantasia, Doro, Stiff Little Fingers, Dead by April, Marko Hietala, Sister Sin, Dampf, Nyrkkitappelu, In Flames , Skid Row, Danko Jones, Hardcore Superstar, Graveyard, Mokoma, Massive Wagons, Cyan Kicks, Klamydia, Reckless Love, Melrose

== See also ==
- Tuska Open Air Metal Festival
