= Finnish Metal Expo =

Former music event in Helsinki, Finland

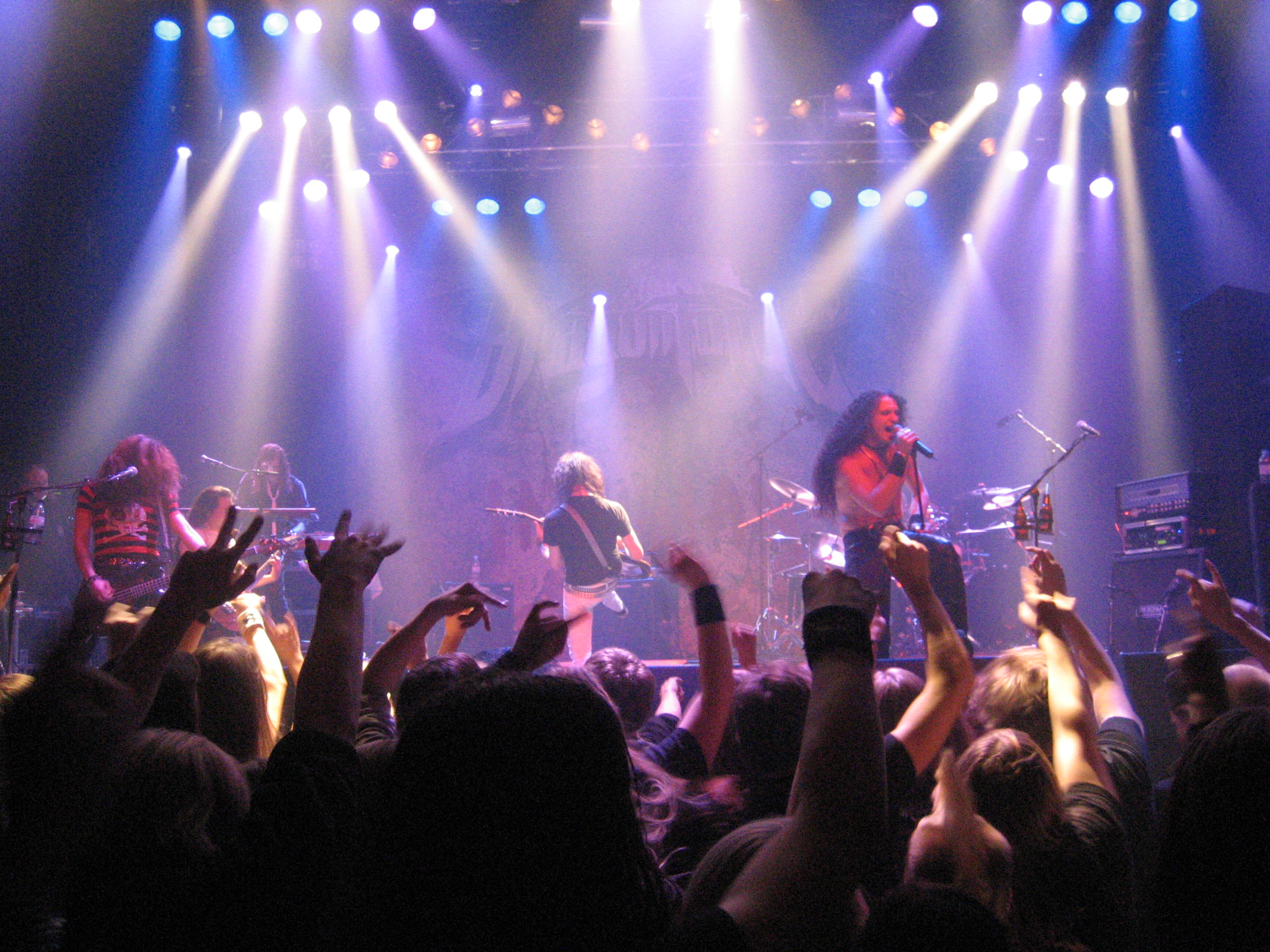
- Genre: Heavy metal
- Dates: February
- Locations: Helsinki, Finland
- Years active: 2005–2012
- Website: fme.fi

Finnish Metal Expo was a heavy metal fair and festival held annually at Kaapelitehdas in Ruoholahti, Helsinki, Finland from 2005 to 2012. It was a part of the Helsinki Metal Meeting. Its original location was the Cablefactory in Helsinki, Finland.

Mark Groman of Braveworlds writes:

"In addition to discussing global improvements for touring, marketing and promoting the music, FME introduces outsiders to homegrown talent, while entertaining the natives with top-flight international bands."

== 2005 lineup ==
- Agonizer
- Amoral
- Callisto
- Codeon
- Finntroll
- Godsplague
- Hevein
- Kill the Romance
- Machine Men
- Mnemic
- Pain Confessor
- Purity
- SinKing
- Sonata Arctica
- Tarot
- Teräsbetoni
- The Scourger
- Total Devastation
- Velcra

== 2006 lineup ==
- 45 Degree Woman
- Ajattara
- Amorphis
- ANJ
- Bloodpit
- Ensiferum
- Evergrey
- Kotipelto
- Pain Confessor
- SinKing
- Swallow the Sun
- U.D.O.
- Verjnuarmu
- Waltari
- Winterborn

== 2007 lineup ==
- Amon Amarth
- April
- Battlelore
- Before the Dawn
- Brother FireTribe
- Cyan Velvet Project
- Coldworker
- DragonForce
- Insomnium
- Misery Inc.
- Moonsorrow
- Rytmihäiriö
- Suburban Tribe
- Tacere
- Turmion Kätilöt

== 2008 lineup ==
- Amberian Dawn
- Ari Koivunen
- Cause for Effect
- Discard
- Kiuas
- Korpiklaani
- Municipal Waste
- Mustasch
- Norther
- Soilwork
- Sotajumala
- Stam1na
- The Scourger
- The Sorrow
- Turisas

== 2009 lineup ==
- Alestorm
- Ancara
- Andre Matos
- Before the Dawn
- Black Dahlia Murder
- Blake
- Chaosweaver
- Ensiferum
- Grendel
- Grand Magus
- Legion of the Damned
- Medeia
- Misery Index
- Profane Omen

== 2010 lineup ==
- Satyricon
- Hypocrisy
- Sonata Arctica
- Apocalyptica
- Insomnium
- Korpiklaani
- jumpmetalcorejumppers
- Doom Unit
