= Baptism (band) =

Finnish black metal band

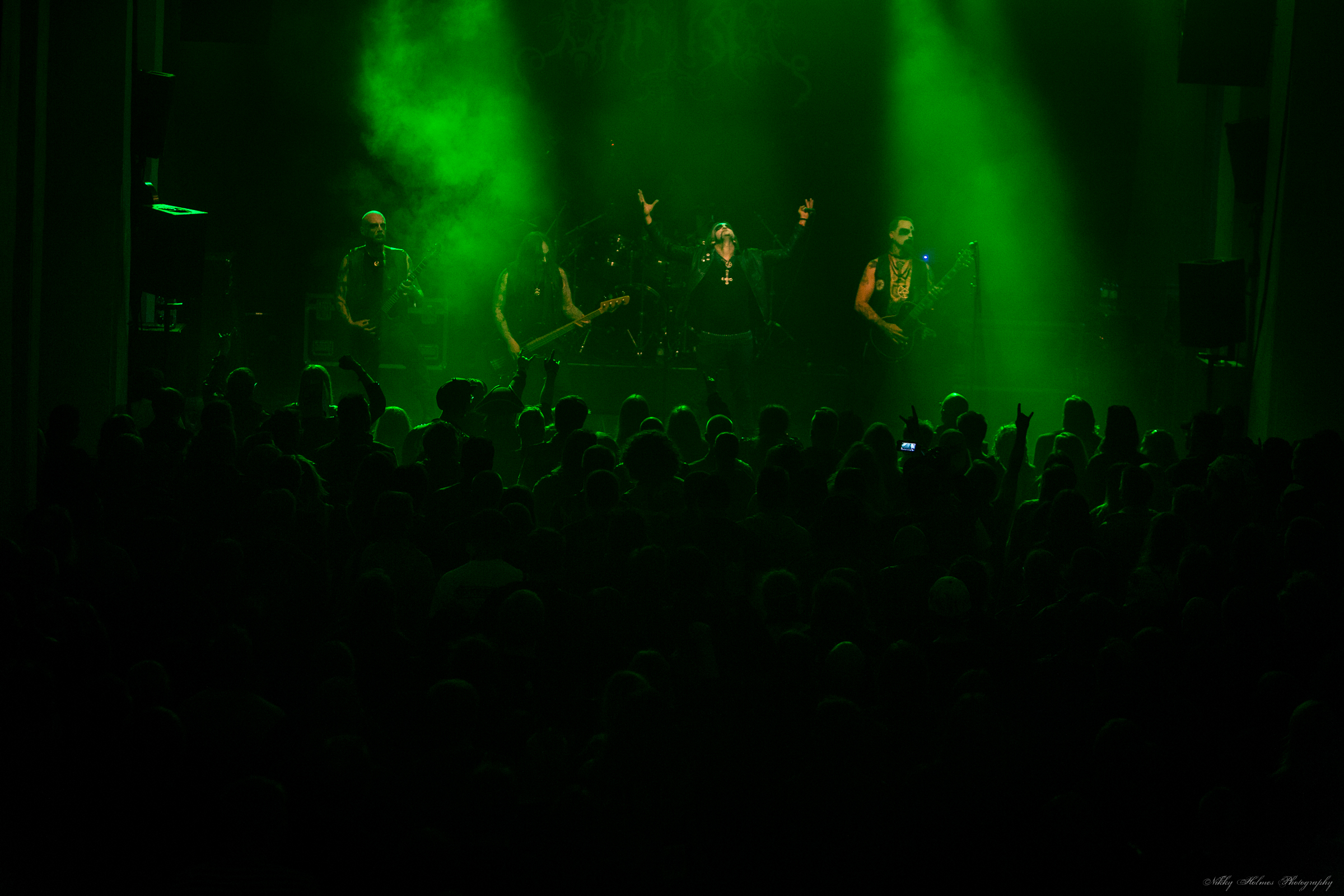
- Baptism live at Tuska Open Air Metal Festival in 2017

Background information
- Origin: Tampere, Finland
- Genre: Black metal
- Years active: 1998–present
- Label: Season of Mist
- Members: Lord Sargofagian
- Past members: Slaughterer; Demonium; Kobalt

Baptism is a black metal band from Finland formed in 1998 by vocalist/guitarist Lord Sargofagian and drummer Demonium. The summer of that year, the band released very few copies their first demo, Satanic Rituals. Following a two-year hiatus, the band released their second demo, Sons of Ruin & Terror, in 2000. The release was limited. After adding bassist Slaughterer the band released their first album, The Beherial Midnight, on 12 June 2002. The band release three more albums in 2004; a split CD with Uncreation's Dawn, and the EPs Wisdom & Hate and Black Ceremony. Slaughterer and Demonium left the band following the release of Wisdom & Hate, leaving Lord Sargofagian as the only official member. The band has continued with session musicians, and have released four more albums.

== Members ==
=== Current ===
- Lord Sargofagian – vocals, all instruments (Valonsurma, Calvarium, Black Death Ritual, ex-Behexen (live), ex-Ravine, ex-Satanic Warmaster, ex-Trotzreich, ex-Uncreation's Dawn, ex-Horna, ex-Ymir)

=== Live members ===
- sg.7 – guitar, vocals (clean) (Horna, Darkwoods My Betrothed, Trollheim's Grott, Black Death Ritual, Slave's Mask, ex-Turmion Kätilöt, Prevalent Resistance)
- TG – lead guitar (True Black Dawn, Trollheim's Grott, ex-Steep)
- Syphon – bass (True Black Dawn, O, ex-...And Oceans, ex-Deathbound)
- LRH – drums (Horna, Black Death Ritual, Darkwoods My Betrothed, Deathchain, Forgotten Horror, Trollheim's Grott, Chamber of Unlight, Demilich (live), Demonic Christ (live))

=== Former ===
- Slaughterer – bass (2001-2003)
- Demonium – drums (1998-2003)
- Kobalt – drums (live) (2004-2007) (Devilry)
- Cinatas – bass (live) (2004-2007) (IC Rex)
- SDS – guitar (live) (2004-2007)
- M. – bass (live) (2007-2011) (Sargeist)

== Discography ==
=== Full-length albums ===
- The Beherial Midnight (2002)
- Morbid Wings of Sathanas (2005)
- Grim Arts of Melancholy (2008)
- As Darkness Enters (2012)
- V: The Devil's Fire (2016)

=== EPs ===
- Wisdom & Hate (2004)
- Black Ceremony (2004)
- Evil Mysteries (2006)
- Chalice of Death (2010)

=== Demos ===
- Satanic Rituals (1998)
- Sons of Ruin & Terror (2000)

=== Splits ===
- Primitive Finland (2003, with Clandestine Blaze, Annihilatus, Bloodhammer, Incriminated, and Blasphemous Evil)
- Baptism / Uncreation's Dawn (2004)

=== Compilations ===
- Gloria Tibi Satana (2015)
