= Lab Band =

Lab Band may refer to:

- Black Lab, American alternative rock band from Berkeley, California
- The Lab (Australian band), electronic/synthpop band from Sydney, Australia
- LAB (band), alternative rock band from Helsinki, Finland
- One O'Clock Lab Band, the big band (jazz) from the University of North Texas College of Music
- Two O'Clock Lab Band, the big band (jazz) from the University of North Texas College of Music
