= Hateform =

Finnish death/thrash metal band

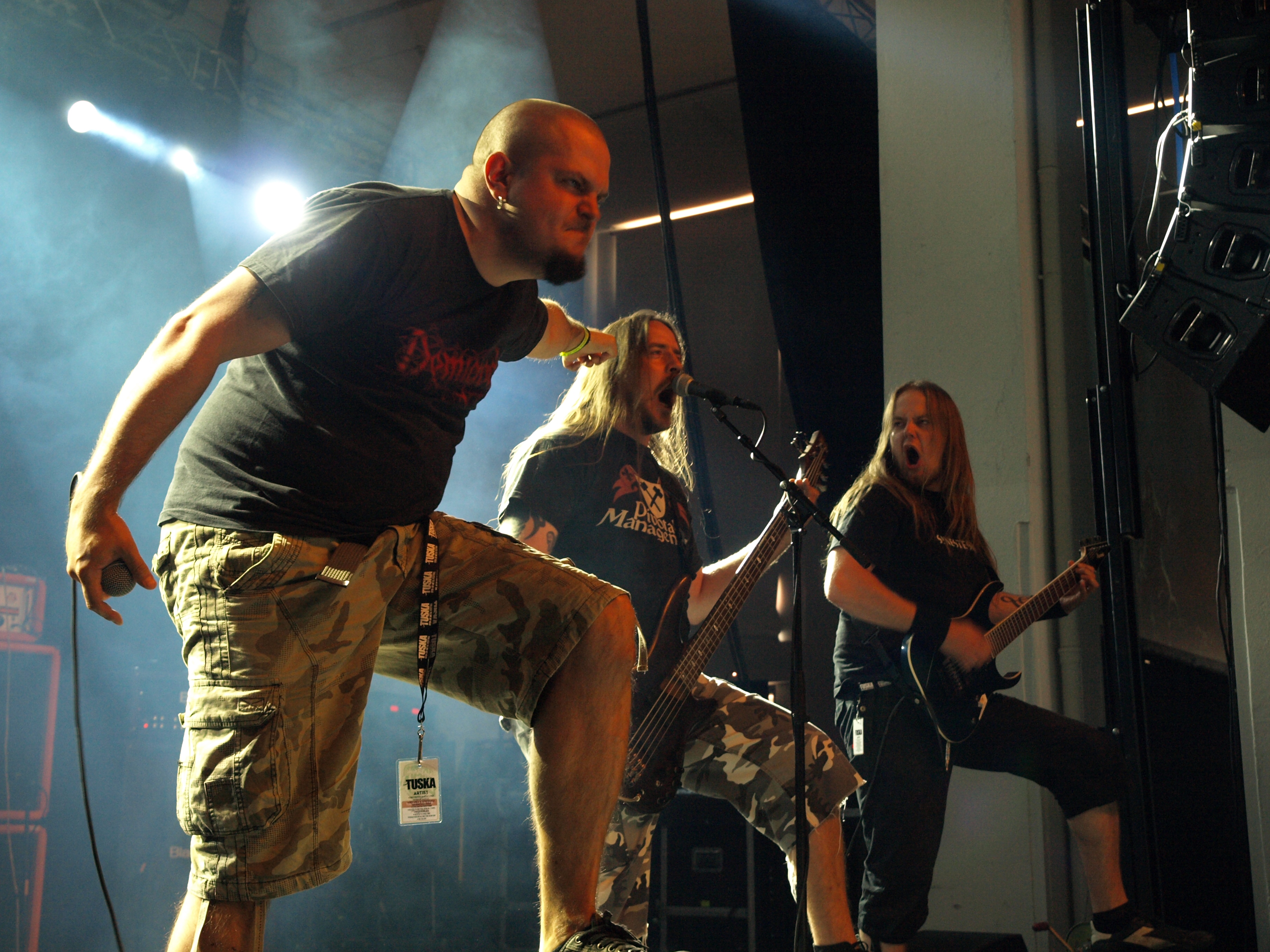
Hateform live at Tuska Open Air 2013

Hateform is a Finnish band that plays death/thrash metal. The band was founded by Tomy Laisto, Joni Suonenjärvi, and Tuomas Vähämaa in 2004. Soon after Hateform was founded Petri Nyström, the current lead vocalist joined the band. In 2005 Ville Vänni, the lead guitar player of Insomnium joined the band. In 2005 Vänni departed from the band because of his own projects. In 2006 Tom Gardiner, the lead guitar player from Mordred and Scorched Earth Tactics replaced Vänni. The first album of the band, titled Dominance, came out in 2007. In 2008 Hateform won The Year's Beginner Award at Finnish Metal Awards. The latest release is 2013's Sanctuary In Abyss.

== Band members ==
=== Current ===
- Petri Nyström - lead vocals
- Tomy Laisto - lead guitar
- Tom Gardiner - guitar
- Joni Suodenjärvi - bass, backing vocals
- Tuomo Latvala - drums

=== Former ===
- Ville Vänni - guitar

== Discography ==
Studio albums

- Dominance (2008)
- Origins of Plague (2010)
- Sanctuary in Abyss (2013)

Demos

- S/T Promo CD 2005 (2005)
- Retaliate (2006)

Singles

- Teuvo, Maanteiden Kuningas (2006)
