= Balance Breach =

Finnish metal band

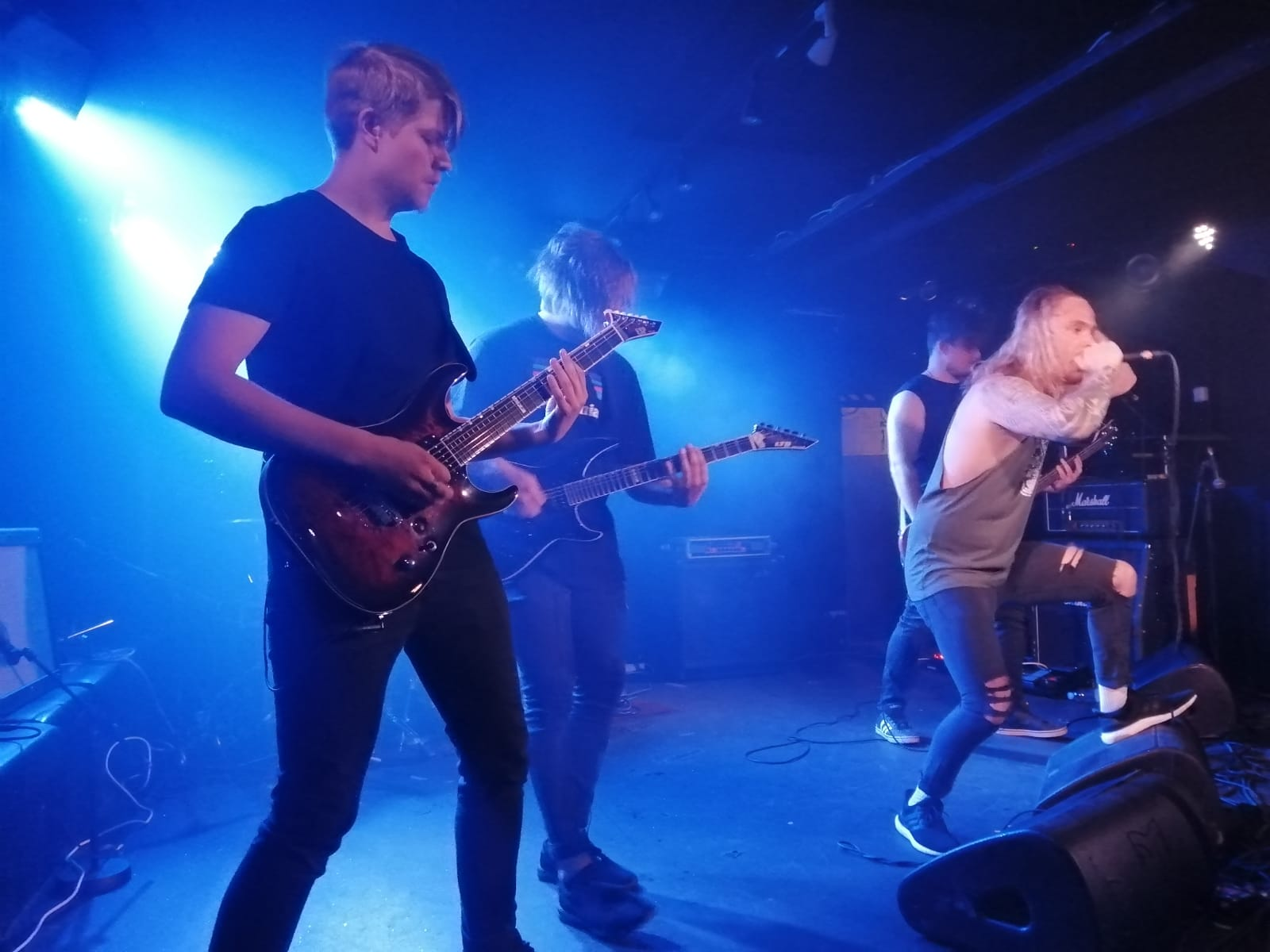
- Balance Breach live 2019

Background information
- Origin: Mikkeli, Finland
- Genres: Metalcore, Djent
- Years active: 2015–present
- Labels: Out of Line Music
- Members: Aleksi Paasonen; Antti Halonen; Joni Härkönen; Saku Heimonen; Terho Korhonen
- Website: https://www.facebook.com/balancebreach/

Balance Breach is a metalcore band from Mikkeli, Finland, formed in 2015. After winning the Tuska festival competition and performing at the Tuska Open Air Metal Festival in summer 2019, the band has been under contract with Out of Line Music since January 2020. In July of the same year, they released their first album Dead End Diaries. The second album followed in May 2023.

== Discography ==
=== Albums ===
- 2020: Dead End Diaries, Out of Line
- 2023: ABYZMAL, Out of Line
- 2025: Save Our Souls, Out of Line

=== EP ===
- 2015: Incarceration
- 2024: Just to Lose It All

=== Singles ===
- 2017: Babylon
- 2018: Memento
- 2019: Hypocrite
- 2020: Most Of This
- 2020: Dead End Diaries

=== Music video ===
- 2017: Babylon
