= Jess and the Ancient Ones =

Finnish rock band

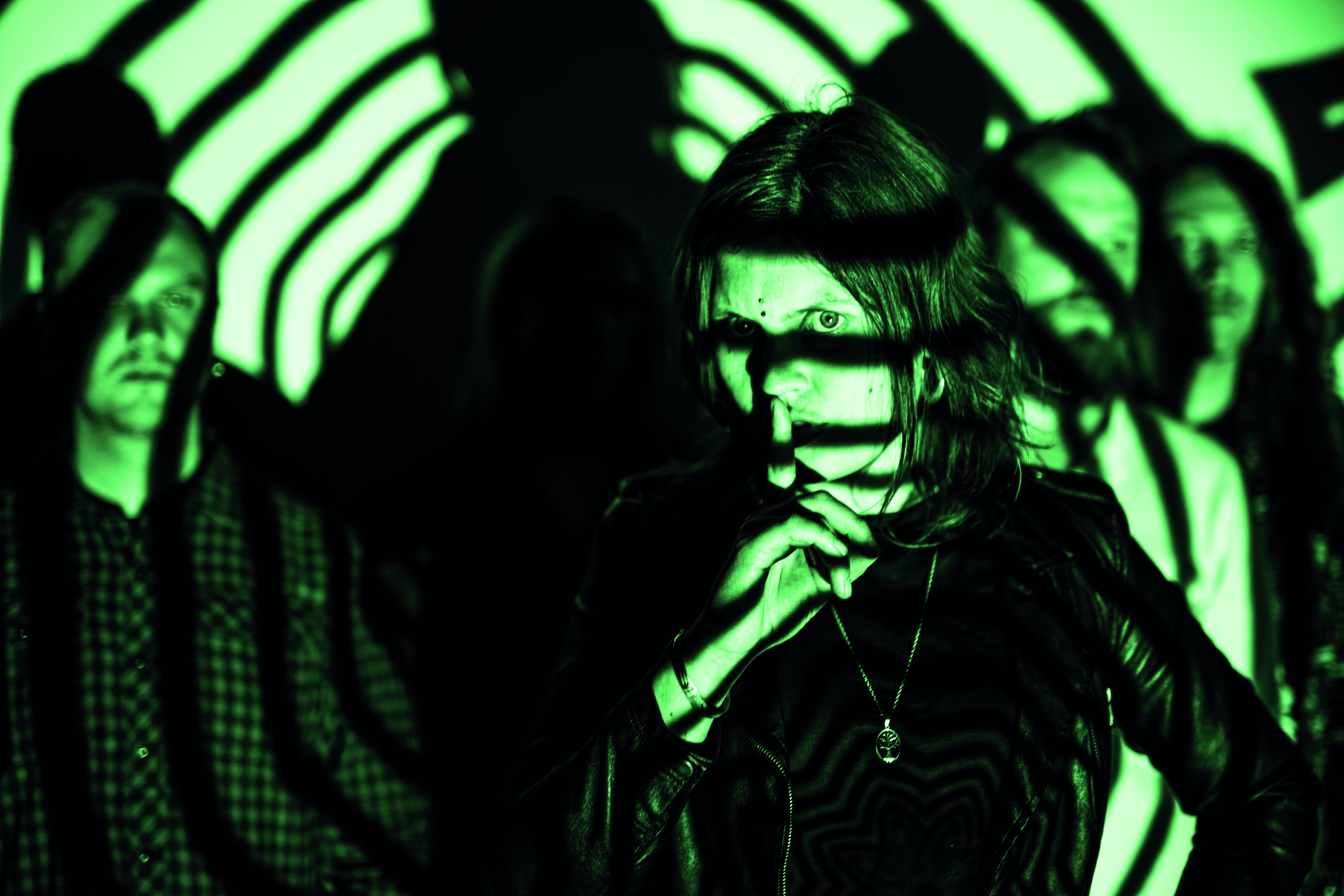

Background information
- Origin: Finland
- Genres: Psychedelic rock; occult rock; progressive rock
- Years active: 2010–present

Jess and the Ancient Ones is a Finnish psychedelic rock band that was formed in Kuopio in 2010. Some of the members of the band were co-musicians in the Finnish metal band Deathchain. The band has released four albums: The self-titled Jess and the Ancient Ones in 2012, Second Psychedelic Coming: The Aquarius Tapes in 2015, The Horse and Other Weird Tales in 2017, and Vertigo in 2021.

They have also released the 2013 EP Astral Sabbat, which was produced by Tore Stjerna of Necromorbus Studio.

The band had a notable collaboration with Spain's Deadmask in a 7" split release The Deepest Sea / Into Starlit Chambers.

== Members ==
- Tommi "Thomas Corpse" Hoffren (2010–) — guitars
- Jarkko "Fast Jake" Luomajoki (2010–) — bass
- Jussi "Yussuf" Saarela (2010–) — drums and percussion
- Jesse H. (2023–) — guitars
- Antti Boman (2024–) — guitars
- Laura Vespini (2025–) — vocals
- Katya (2025–) — keyboards

=== Former members ===
- Von Stroh — guitar
- Thomas Fiend – guitar and backing vocals (2010–2016)
- Jasmin "Jess" Saarela (2010–2025) – vocals
- Timo "Abraham" Keinänen — keyboards, organ, synthesizer

== Discography ==
=== Albums ===
Year	Album	Peak positions	Certification
Year	Album	FIN	Certification
2012	Jess and the Ancient Ones	7	
2015	Second Psychedelic Coming: The Aquarius Tapes	43	
2017	The Horse and Other Weird Tales	34	
2021	Vertigo	20	

=== EPs ===
Year	Album	Peak positions	Certification
Year	Album	FIN	Certification
2013	Astral Sabbat	15	

Other collaborations

- 2012: "The Deepest Sea" / "Into Starlit Chambers" (split Jess and the Ancient Ones / Deadmask EP

=== Singles ===
- 2011: "13th Breath of the Zodiac"
- 2014: "Castaneda"
- 2015: "In Levitating Secret Dreams"
- 2021: "Summer Tripping Man"
- 2026: "Skeleton"
