= Deathbound =

Finnish death metal band

- Also known as: Twilight; Unbound
- Origin: Vaasa, Finland
- Genres: Death metal, grindcore
- Years active: 1995–2010
- Label: Dynamic Arts
- Members: Kai Jaakkola; Petri Seikkula; Sami Latva; Toni Pihlaja
- Past members: Nicklas Sundqvist; Fred Andersson; Hannu Teppo; Tommi Konu; Mika Aalto; Heikki Järvi; Blastmor; Mikael Sandorf; Robert Sundelin; Toni Erkkilä
- Website: deathbound.net

Deathbound was a death metal band from Vaasa, Finland. They formed in 1995 and split up in 2010. They were signed to Dynamic Arts Records and released four albums while active, the most recent being Non Compos Mentis (2010).

== History ==
Deathbound formed in 1995 as Twilight. They released two demos under this name, Twilight and Melancholy of Northern Landscapes. After this, they renamed to Unbound and released another demo, Flames of Madness. They finally settled on the name Deathbound. Under this name, they released one more demo, Elaborate the Torture. The band signed to Woodcut Records and released their first album, To Cure the Sane with Insanity. The band signed to Dynamic Arts Records and recorded a split album with death metal band Deathchain. The band released their second album, with record label Dynamic Arts Records, entitled Doomsday Comfort, featuring guest vocals by Mieszko Talarczyk, vocalist and guitarist of Swedish grindcore band Nasum. This was the last project Mieszko worked on before his death during the 2004 Indian Ocean earthquake. Deathbound released their third album, We Deserve Much Worse, in 2007, and their fourth album, Non Compos Mentis, in 2010.

== Members ==
Final lineup

- Petri "Pete" Seikkula – guitar (1995–2010)
- Kai Jaakkola – vocals (1995–2010)
- Sami Latva – drums (2003–2010)

Former

- Tommy "Kuntz" Konu – bass (1995–2003)
- Fredrik Andersson (II) – guitar (1998–1999)
- Nicklas Sundqvist – guitar (1999–2000)
- Mikael Sandorf – drums (2000)
- Mika Aalto – drums, bass (2002–2003, 2004)
- Hannu Teppo – bass (2003–2004)
- Heikki Järvi – bass (2005–2006)
- Toni Pihlaja – bass (2006–2009)

== Discography ==
=== As Twilight ===
==== Demos ====
- Twilight (1995)
- Melancholy of Northern Landscapes (1995)

=== As Unbound ===
==== Demos ====
- Flames of Madness (1999)

=== As Deathbound ===
==== Albums ====
- To Cure the Sane with Insanity (2003)
- Doomsday Comfort (2005)
- We Deserve Much Worse (2007)
- Non Compos Mentis (2010)

==== Splits ====
- Deathbound/Deathchain Split (2005)

==== Demos ====
- Elaborate the Torture (2000)
