= LAB (band) =

Finnish alternative rock band

- Origin: Helsinki, Finland
- Genres: Alternative rock, hard rock, punk rock, reggae fusion, progressive rock, industrial rock, industrial, experimental rock, pop-punk, Riot grrrl
- Members: Ana Leppälä - lead singer; Pekka "Splendid" Laine - guitar; Johannes Leppälä - guitar *; Kirka Sainio - bass (Airdash, The Scourger, Gandalf): Masa - drummer

LAB is an alternative rock band from Helsinki, Finland. Their single "Beat the Boys" was featured in the PS2/Xbox/PC game "Flatout".

The band has released three albums.

== Formation ==
The band formed in 1997, and consisted of five members. (Singer Ana and guitarist Johannes are siblings).

- Ana Leppälä - lead singer
- Pekka "Splendid" Laine - guitar
- Johannes Leppälä - guitar
- Kirka Sainio - bass (Airdash, The Scourger, Gandalf)
- Masa - drummer

== Discography ==
=== Albums ===
- Porn Beautiful (2000)
- Devil Is a Girl (2002)
- Where Heaven Ends (2005)

=== Singles ===
- Get Me a Name (06/1999)
- 'Til You're Numb (09/1999)
- Isn't He Beautiful (02/2000)
- Killing Me (06/2000)
- Beat the Boys (02/2002)
- Machine Girl (07/2003)
- When Heaven Gets Dirty (03/2005)
- Love Like Hell (04/2005)
- The Pianist (10/2022)
- Please Killin (2/2023)
- Spanish Flame (5/2023)
- My Private Hospital (10/2023)

=== Music videos ===
- 'Til You're Numb
- Beat the Boys
- Machine Girl
- When Heaven Gets Dirty

The majority of their music videos feature the singer Ana wearing a pair of white angel wings.
