= April (Finnish band) =

Finnish crossover metal band

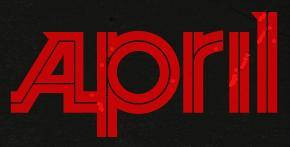

Background information
- Origin: Helsinki
- Genres: Metalcore; Alternative metal
- Years active: 2007 - 2009
- Labels: Spinefarm Records
- Members: Hakim Hietikko; Mikko Merilinna; Janne Aulavuori; Maarik Leppä; Tuomas Rauhala
- Past members: J.Fatal; Mikko Huovila; Jaakko Pulkki; Kimmo Enroth

April was a Finnish crossover metal band. After disbanding, vocalist Hakim Hietikko went on to found For The Imperium.

== Discography ==
=== Studio albums ===
- Tidelines (2007)
- Anthems for the Rejected (2008)

== EPs ==
- First Blood (2007)
- The War (2008)
- Power of One (2006)
