= Ancara (band) =

Finnish heavy metal band

Ancara is a heavy metal band from Kerava, Finland.

Ancara was founded in 1985 as Metal Circus. It later changed its name to MC, then Resistance in 1992, and then Ancara in 1996. The band didn't record its debut, however, until 2006, by which time only drummer Timo Rajala remained from the original lineup of Metal Circus. Their debut album, sung in English, was a success in Finland, and soon after the group released the single "The World", which reached No. 2 in that country.

== Members ==
- Sammy Salminen - vocals (1996-)
- Juha Wahlsten - guitar, vocals (2001-)
- Toni Laroma – guitar (2016–)
- Jarkko Ahonen – bass (2017–)
- Tom Rask – drums (2017–)

=== Former members ===
- Timo Kytölä – guitar (1996–2003)
- Samuel Hjelt – guitar, vocals (2003–2008)
- Timo Rajala – drums (1996–2015)
- Rale Tiiainen – drums (2015–2017)
- Mika Rajala – bass (1996–2015)
- Toni Hintikka – bass (2015–2017)
- Tuomas Keskinen – guitar, vocals (2009–2016)

== Discography ==
- The Dawn (2006) FIN No. 27
- Beyond the Dark (2007) FIN No. 9
- Chasing Shadows (2009) FIN No. 32
- Garden of Chains (2017)
