= For the Imperium =

For The Imperium
- Origin: Helsinki, Suomi
- Genres: heavy metal, rock, alternative rock
- Years active: 2008 - present
- Label: Warner Music Finland
- Website: www.fortheimperium.com

For The Imperium is an experimental metal band from Helsinki, Finland. Their music is a mixture of modern metal, pop, classic rock and electro. For The Imperium has released two full-length albums and has supported Devin Townsend Project on their 2013 UK-tour.

== History ==
For The Imperium was formed in Helsinki, 2008. The band released two self-financed EPs and played in various venues around Finland, Latvia and Sweden, eventually catching the attention of Warner Music Finland.

=== First album ===
For The Imperium's first full-length album was released in 2011 via Warner Music Finland. The record was mixed and produced by Kari Huikuri in Scandal Studios, Helsinki.

The album received positive reviews and the band played plenty of gigs, including Tuska Open Air Metal Festival 2012, Finland's most important metal festival.

In 2012, Lifeforce Records released the album in Europe, including a bonus track "He's a Whore", originally made by Cheap Trick.

=== Hail the Monsters ===
Their second album, Hail The Monsters, was produced and engineered by Kari Huikuri, mixed by Miitri Aaltonen and mastered by Mika Jussila at Finnvox Studios. The album was released in Finland on Warner Music Finland and in the UK on Graphite Records.

The band was featured in Metal Hammer magazine as a "Hot New Band" in their April 2013 issue. The music video for the single Sudden Death was censored in the UK.

The band signed a booking deal with Continental Concerts in February 2013.

The band played a handful of shows in Finland and toured in the UK twice, supporting Breed77 and Devin Townsend Project. In the fall 2013, the band supported Children Of Bodom on their Finnish tour dates. In 2014 the band also played at the Wacken Open Air festival.

== Line up ==
- Jyri Helko – bass (2008–)
- Hakim Hietikko – vocals (2008–)
- Tuomas Rauhala – drums (2008–)
- Panu Rauhala - keyboards (2014-)
- Joona Björkroth - guitar (2014-)
- Ville Suorsa – guitar (2008–2014)

== Discography ==
=== Albums ===
- For the Imperium (2011, Warner Music)
- Hail the Monsters (2013, Warner Music)

=== EPs / demos ===
- In/Die (2009, self-financed)
- This Is Chaos, Baby! (2010, self-financed)
- Titans Fall (2015, Music Kickup)
