= One Morning Left =

Finnish metalcore band

- Origin: Vaasa
- Genres: Metalcore, electronicore, post-hardcore
- Years active: 2008–2025
- Label: Arising Empire
- Past members: Mika Lahti; Miska Sipiläinen; Leevi Luoto; Juuso Turkki; Dennis Hallbäck
- Website: www.onemorningleft.com

One Morning Left was a Finnish metalcore band formed by singer Mika Lahti in Vaasa in 2008. The band enjoyed popularity in Finland and has also toured Germany, Latvia, Lithuania, Finland, Iceland, Japan and Russia. They released four full-length albums and two EPs. It was disbanded in 2025 as a consequence of child grooming allegations against Lahti.

== History ==
Their first full-length album, The Bree-Teenz, was released on 24 August 2011 by the label Spinefarm Records. Their second album, Our Sceneration was recorded during the summer of 2012 and released on 22 February 2013.

In early 2014, drummer and clean vocalist Tomi Takamaa announced that he would leave the band. Shortly after, the band announced that Niko Hyttinen, who had formerly played in the band Snow White's Poison Bite, would replace Takamaa as the new drummer. They also announced that the clean vocals and second guitar would be played by Leevi Luoto from the band ARF.

On 16 December 2015, the band announced that they had been dropped from Spinefarm and signed with American-based label Imminence Records for the North American and Oceania territories. They also announced the release of their third album, Metalcore Superstars, for 22 January 2016. After the release Metalcore Superstars band toured a lot in clubs and festivals in Finland, Baltics, Europe, Iceland and Japan.

In early 2025, it was confirmed that One Morning Left would compete in the 2025 edition of Uuden Musiikin Kilpailu with the song "Puppy", however, on 22 January, it was announced that they had been disqualified due to a contract violation. The band published a statement the same day, announcing it was being disbanded due to child grooming allegations made against its lead vocalist and founder, Mika Lahti.

== Members ==
=== Past members ===
- Mika Lahti – unclean vocals
- Juuso Turkki – guitar, backing vocals
- Leevi Luoto – guitar, clean vocals
- Miska Sipiläinen– bass guitar, backing vocals
- Touko Keippilä – keyboards, synthesizers
- Dennis Hallbäck – drums
- Tomi Takamaa – drums, clean vocals
- Tuomas Teittinen – bass guitar
- Roni Harju – guitar, clean vocals
- Oula Maaranen – guitar
- Teemu Rautiainen – bass guitar
- Valtteri Numminen – drums
- Veli-Matti Kananen – bass guitar, keyboards
- Ari Levola – guitar
- Liam McCourt – lead guitar
- Niko Hyttinen – drums
- Tuukka Ojansivu – guitar, backing vocals

== Discography ==
=== Studio albums ===
- The Bree-TeenZ (2011)
- Our Sceneration (2013)
- Metalcore Superstars (2016)
- Hyperactive (2021)
- Neon Inferno (2024)

=== Extended plays ===
- Panda Loves Penguin (2008)
- Panda Loves Penguin Vol. 2 (2009)

=== Singles ===
- "!liaf cipE" (2011)
- "The Star of Africa" (2014)
- "You're Dead, Let's Disco!" (2015)
- "Metalcore Superstars" Remixes (2016)
- "Neon Highway" (2020)
- "Ruby Dragon" (2021)
- "Sinners Are Winners" (2021)
- "Ruthless Resistance" (2021)
- "Creatvres" (2021)
- "Beat It" (2021)
- "Intergalactic Casanova" (2021)
- "Tonight" (2022)
- "Neon Inferno (Paradise)" (2023)
- "Emerald Dragon" (2024)
- "Summerlovin" (2024)
- "Puppy" (2025)
