= Suotana =

Finnish melodic death metal band

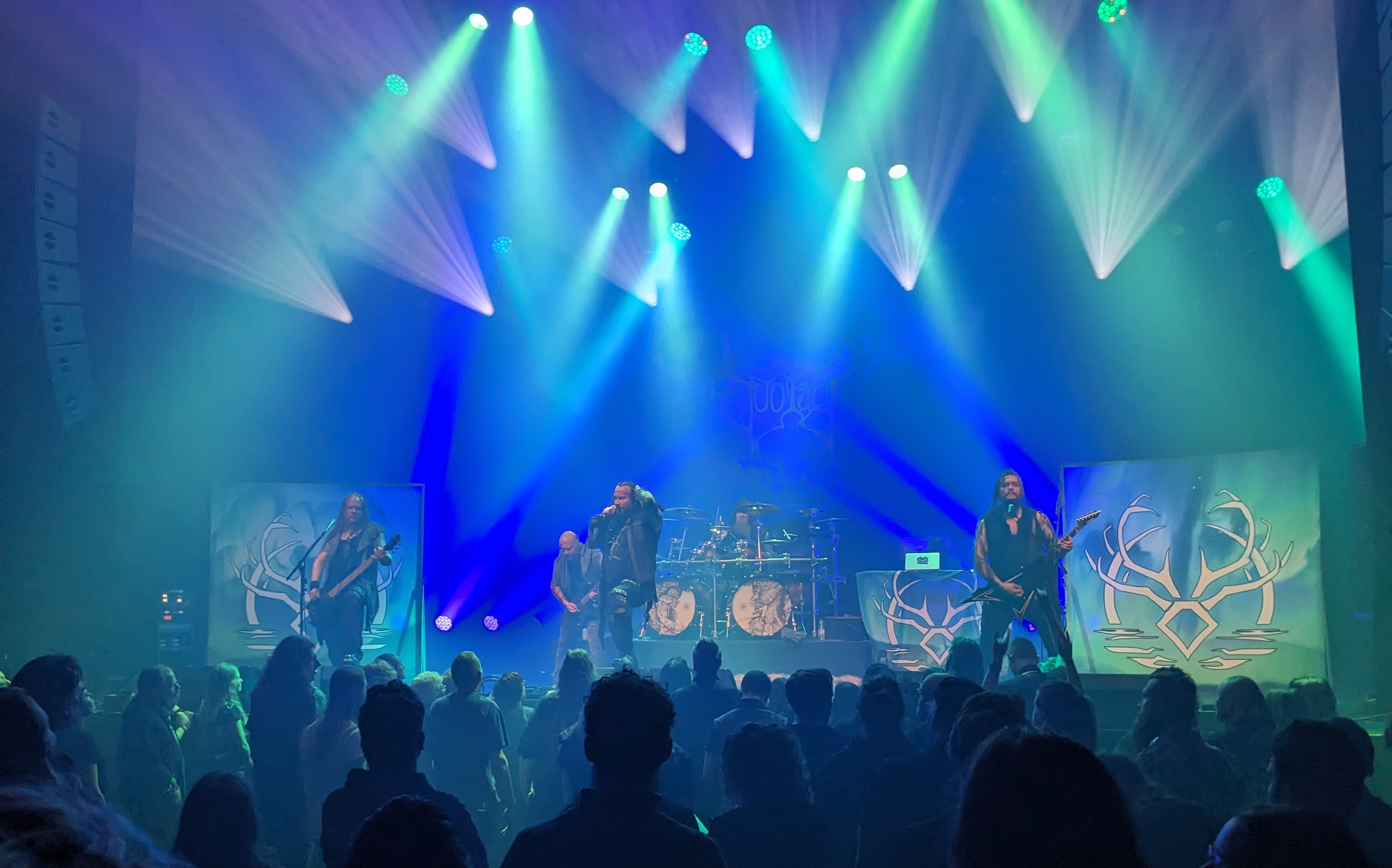
- Suotana performing in Nijmegen, 2024

Background information
- Origin: Rovaniemi, Finland
- Genres: Melodic death metal, melodic black metal
- Years active: 2005–present
- Label: Reaper Entertainment
- Members: Ville Rautio; Pasi Portaankorva; Rauli Juopperi; Tommi Neitola; Tuomo Marttinen; Rauli Alaruikka
- Past members: Jari Körkkö; Juhani Merkkiniemi; Harri Portimo
- Website: suotana.com

Suotana are a Finnish melodic death metal band from Rovaniemi, Lapland. Formed in 2005 by Ville Rautio, the band's current lineup includes Ville, bassist Rauli Alaruikka, vocalist Tuomo Marttinen, drummer Rauli Juopperi. keyboardist Tommi Neitola and guitarist Pasi Portaankorva. The band's style has generally been characterised as a mixture of melodic death metal and melodic black metal, with elements of power metal. Suotana have released four studio albums.

== History ==
Suotana was formed in initially as a solo project by guitarist/vocalist Ville Rautio. By 2013, Suotana's lineup was completed with guitarist Pasi Portaankorva, bassist Harri Portimo, keyboardist Jari Körkkö, backing vocalist Juhani Merkkiniemi and drummer Rauli Juopperi.

Suotana released their first demo, Forgotten Soil of this Land, in February 2014, with their debut studio album, Frostrealm being released independently almost two years later in November 2015. Although Frostrealm achieved little commercial success, it received generally positive reception from listeners and critics in the underground community.

Following the release of Frostrealm, Suotana underwent several lineup changes with the departure of Körkkö in 2015 and Merkkiniemi in 2016, as well as the introduction of keyboardist Tommi Neitola and Tuomo Marttinen, who took over as vocalist from Rautio. In February 2018, Suotana signed with Reaper entertainment, through which they would go on to release all of their subsequent albums.

On 25 May 2018, Suotana released their second studio album, Land of the Ending Time. Shortly after the album's release, Portimo departed from the band, with bassist Rauli Alaruikka joining in 2019 as replacement.

Suotana's third studio album, Ounas I, released on 17 March 2023. Shortly after, the band performed live for the first time at On the Rocks in Helsinki on 30 March 2023, alongside fellow Finnish melodic death metal bands Kalmah and Mors Subita.

The band's fourth studio album, Ounas II, a follow up to their previous album, released on 29 August 2025.

On 16 September 2025, Rautio confirmed in an interview that a fifth studio album was planned, with recording set to begin in November.

== Members ==
=== Current members ===
- Ville Rautio – guitars (2005–present); vocals (2005–2015)
- Pasi Portaankorva – guitars (2005–present)
- Rauli Juopperi – drums (2013–present)
- Tommi Neitola – keyboards (2013–present)
- Tuomo Marttinen – vocals (2013–present)
- Rauli Alaruikka – bass (2019–present)

=== Former members ===
- Jari Körkkö – keyboards (2012–2015)
- Juhani Merkkiniemi – vocals (2012–2016)
- Harri Portimo – bass (2012–2018)

== Discography ==
=== Studio albums ===
- Frostrealm (2015)
- Land of the Ending Time (2018)
- Ounas I (2023)
- Ounas II (2025)

=== Demos ===
- Forgotten Soil of this Land (2014)
