= Drive (band) =

American heavy metal band

- Origin: Houston, Texas, United States
- Genres: Heavy metal; power metal; progressive metal; speed metal
- Labels: Rhino/Rampage, Zoo Entertainment, 20th Century Music
- Past members: David Taylor; Rick Chavez; Mercy Valdez; Michael Anthony Guerrero; Valentine San Miguel; Mike Conde; Mike Ribiero; Carlos "PeeWee" Cervantes

Drive was an American heavy metal band from Houston, Texas, formed by guitarist Rick Chavez. They released two albums, Characters in Time (1988) and Diablero (1992), while active and an archives release, iDefi, dedicated to the memory of Chavez and vocalist David Taylor, in 2017.

== History ==
Drive formed in Houston, Texas, in the mid-1980s when its members were barely out of high school; but the band soon moved to Los Angeles, which had become the center of the hard rock scene. After winning a KNAC radio contest with their song "I Need The Nights", Drive landed on the 1987 10 Best From the West compilation released by Rampage Records, the hard rock division of Rhino Records. Rampage signed the band and, in July 1988, Drive released their debut album, Characters in Time. The album received good reviews from the industry's hard rock press, including the coveted 5 “K” rating from Kerrang!. The album also received airplay from hard rock stations around the country, including KNAC in Los Angeles.

Drive recorded their sophomore effort, Diablero, for Rampage and advance tapes were circulating at the time, but the album's release was put on hold. At the turn of the decade the band left Rampage and signed with Zoo Entertainment, a new BMG label, that would later become connected with the band Tool. In 1992, the band released a re-worked version of Diablero to rave reviews from the metal underground.

A shake-up at the label along with the dawn of the metal-killing grunge scene left the album without much of a push, and the band's recording career was put on hold, as members moved back to Texas. There Chavez and Taylor assembled one last Drive line-up, featuring bassist Mike Ribiero and drummer Carlos Cervantes, before putting things on hold. The break became permanent and Drive would not perform as a band again.

On June 25, 2009, while driving along a San Antonio, Texas interstate, lead singer David Taylor lost control of his vehicle due to a tire malfunction and crashed. He was airlifted to an area hospital where he died of his injuries five days later. He was 44 years old.

Eventually, founding member Rick Chavez was approached by German-American re-issue label 20th Century Music about releasing an album of unreleased material. The release, titled iDefi, surfaced in late 2017 and included "Inherit the Wind" and "Insanity" from the unreleased Rampage version of Diablero, alternate Spanish language versions of "Once Again" ("Otra Vez") and "Pandilla", also originally from Diablero, and various demos. Chavez died on February 25, 2017, from internal bleeding, and did not live to see the album's release.

== Members ==
- David Taylor – lead vocals (deceased in 2009)
- Rick Chavez – guitar, vocals (deceased in 2017)
- Mercy Valdez – guitar on Characters in Time & Diablero
- Mike Conde – guitar on Diablero
- Michael Anthony Guerrero – bass
- Valentine San Miguel – drums on Diablero

Session musician on Characters in Time:

- Eric Singer - drums

Additional musicians on iDefi:

- Mike Ribiero - bass
- Carlos "PeeWee" Cervantes - drums

== Discography ==
- Characters in Time (Rhino/Rampage, 1988)
- Diablero (Zoo Entertainment, 1992)
- iDefi (20th Century Music, 2017)
