= Violent Storm (band) =

American metal band

Violent Storm is an American heavy metal band.

The band was founded by Mick Cervino from Blackmore's Night, who was also the principal songwriter. The band released two albums, Violent Storm (2005) and Storm Warning (2006).

Storm Warning was guested by K.K. Downing, Yngwie Malmsteen and Roy Z, the latter also engineering the album. The reviewer from Rock Hard was positive, giving 7 out of 10 points. Powermetal.de praised most of the aspects, finding that the "top-notch collaboration", "catchy songwriting and performances that would make any guitarist drool" came together "to create a superb debut for Mick Cervino".

Allmusic and Blabbermouth gave the same ratio, 3/5 and 6/10 respectively. Allmusic wrote that "Storm Warning should certainly warrant some inspection" from fans of 1980s metal. They added that the lyrics featured "a few clunkers", echoed by Blabbermouth, whose reviewer found "cringe-inducing" lyrical examples. The album had several instances of good musicianship, "but the songs are your textbook Hard Rock 101 clichés". Scream Magazine opined that songwriting-wise, Violent Storm presented "arch-straightforward metal". According to the reviewer, the band lacked sufficiently strong songs to "make their mark in the metal jungle". Some songs showed promise, but overall the product was quickly forgotten. The grade Storm Warning received was a middle-of-the-road 3 out of 6.

== External link ==
- Discogs

=== Further reading ===
- Review of Storm Warning by Get Ready to Rock!
- Review of Storm Warning by Brutalism
- Review of Storm Warning by Metalfan.nl (in Dutch)
- Review of Storm Warning by RocknWorld
