= Gandalf (Finnish band) =

Finnish death metal band

Background information
- Origin: Helsinki, Finland
- Genres: Melodic death metal, death 'n' roll
- Years active: 1993–2002
- Label: Wicked World

Gandalf was a Finnish melodic death metal band from Helsinki. They incorporated traditional hard rock/heavy metal into their sound, which drew comparisons to Entombed and Sentenced.

The group was formed in 1993 by drummer (then guitarist) Nalle Österman (later in Shaman, Korpiklaani and Lullacry), guitarist Timo Nyberg and vocalist Jari Hurskainen, with session drummer Mika "Gas Lipstick" Karppinen, who later achieved fame with the band HIM. They released both of their albums through Wicked World Records, a subsidiary of Earache Records.

The name Gandalf came from early fans referring to the guitarist as the guitar wizard, Gandalf (from The Lord of the Rings). Since then, the band called themselves Gandalf.

== Members ==
Last lineup

- Jari Hurskainen – vocals
- Timo Nyberg – guitars, backing vocals
- Kirka Sainio – bass
- Nalle Österman – drums

Former members

- Mika "Gas Lipstick" Karppinen – drums
- Niku – bass
- Tommi Launonen – bass
- Santtu Sierilä – guitars
- Sami Vauhkonen – guitars
- Kimmo Aroluoma – bass
- Toni Näykki – guitars
- Harri Hytönen – guitars

== Discography ==
- Deadly Fairytales (1999)
- Rock Hell (2001)
