= Lullacry =

Finnish metal band

Background information
- Also known as: Coarse (1992–1998)
- Origin: Helsinki, Finland
- Genres: Heavy metal; hard rock; gothic metal
- Years active: 1998–2014
- Labels: Heart, Trust & Respect; Spinefarm; Hydrant
- Past members: Tanya Kemppainen; Tanja Lainio; Sami Leppikangas; Sauli Kivilahti; Kimmo "Heavy" Hiltunen; Jukka Outinen
- Website: lullacry.com

Lullacry was a Finnish heavy metal/gothic metal band from Helsinki, active from 1998 to 2014.

== History ==
The band recorded their first demo (named Weeper's Aeon) in 1998 and in a short time they had enough of a following to safely attempt a full-length album – Sweet Desire – recorded in 1999. This got the attention of Spinefarm Records and led to a professional contract. Their career truly began progressing after the release of the album Be My God – from 2001 – which was issued as they went on a joint tour with the power metal band Edguy.

However, vocalist Tanya Kemppainen quit the band in 2002, leaving Lullacry without its main element. Many female singers applied for the post, but the then unknown contralto vocalist Tanja Lainio was ultimately chosen as the replacement vocalist. Their following release was entitled Crucify My Heart. The single "Don't Touch the Flame" taken from this album included a cover of the Nine Inch Nails track, "Head Like a Hole".

Prior to the recording of their fourth album, the EP Fire Within was released including alternative versions of two of the band's classic tracks, a W.A.S.P. cover "L.O.V.E. Machine", and two new tracks.

In June 2005, the band announced the completion of their fourth album entitled Vol. 4, which was released in September the same year. The single "Stranger in You", was released in July.

After a long hiatus, Lullacry released their fifth studio album Where Angels Fear in 2012. It was released through band's own label, OUTO recordings, distributed by Playground Scandinavia, and was licensed to Europe, Japan, North America, Russia, Belarus and Ukraine.

In February 2013, Lullacry released a new video and digi-single for the song "To Every Heartache". They undertook some shows during 2013, basically in Finland, to celebrate their 15-year career, but officially disbanded in 2014 following three farewell shows.

== Band members ==
Final line-up

- Sami Leppikangas – lead guitar (1998–2014)
- Sauli Kivilahti – guitar (1998–2014)
- Kimmo "Heavy" Hiltunen – bass (1998–2014)
- Jukka Outinen – drums (1999–2014)
- Tanja Lainio – vocals (2002–2014)
- Tanya Kemppainen – vocals (1998–2002, 2014)

Live

- Euge Valovirta – bass (2014)

== Discography ==
=== Albums ===
- Sweet Desire (1999)
- Be My God (2001)
- Crucify My Heart (2003)
- Vol. 4 (2005)
- Where Angels Fear (2012)

=== Singles and EPs ===
- "Don't Touch the Flame" (2003)
- "Alright Tonight" (2003)
- "Fire Within" (EP, 2004)
- "Stranger in You" (2005)

=== Compilations ===
- "Legacy 1998–2014" (2014)

=== Digi singles ===
- "Bad Blood" (2012)
- "Feel My Revenge" (2012)
- "Thousand Suns" (2012)
- "To Every Heartache" (2013)
- "Hell on High Heels" (2014)

=== Music videos ===
- "Damn You" (directed by Timo Halo, 2001)
- "Don't Touch the Flame" (directed by Jameye, 2003)
- "King of Pain" (directed by Jameye, 2005)
- "Bad Blood" (directed by Jouko Kallio, 2012)
- "Feel My Revenge" (directed by Jouko Kallio, 2012)
- "To Every Heartache" (directed by Sauli Kivilahti, 2013)
