= Doom Unit =

Finnish rock band

- Origin: Tampere, Finland
- Genres: Rock, metal
- Years active: 2008-present
- Labels: 2009-2013 Hype Records; 2013-2014 Warner Music
- Members: Jape; Chris; Julli; Kari
- Website: http://www.doomunit.com

Doom Unit is a Finnish rock band from Tampere. It was formed in late 2008 and became famous since winning Radio Rock's Starba -competition in 2009. The band's first single (entitled "Killing Time") was a huge hit in Finland and also ended up as a theme music for Harper's Island TV-program in Finland.

== Career ==
Doom Unit released their first studio album "Cross the Line" in 2009, which hit the Finnish Album Chart #2. The follower "The Burden of Bloom" was released in 2011 and third one "III" was out in 2013 and reached #12 in the album chart . Doom Unit is a four-piece bulldozer, leading singer Jape who is also known as famous radio / TV voice. Known of the energic live shows and many radio hits, Doom Unit is back in biz with their latest effort "Underdog" (2015).

== Band members ==
- Jape Ylinikka - Vocals, Guitars (2008–present)
- Chris Heikkilä - Guitars, Vocals (2008–present)
- Julli Väkevä - Drums (2008–present)
- Kari Luonsinen - Bass (2014–present)

=== Former members ===
- Nahka - Bass (2008–2013)
- AH Haapasalo - Bass (2013–2014)

== Discography ==
=== Singles ===
- Killing Time (2009)
- Chameleon (2009)
- Hide Your Scars (2009)
- Pile of Bones (2010)
- Reckoning Day (2011)
- The Cradle and the Grave (2011)
- .45 (2014)
- Get Away (2013)
- Crawler (2014)
- Underdog (2015)
- Black Day Comes (2019)

=== Albums ===
- Cross the Line (2009)
- The Burden of Bloom (2011)
- III (2013)

=== Music videos ===
- Killing Time (2009)
- The Cradle and the Grave (2011)
- Get Away (2013)
- Underdog (2015)
