= Pain Confessor =

Finnish death metal band

- Origin: Finland
- Genres: Melodic death metal, metalcore
- Years active: 2002-present
- Labels: Megamania; Spinefarm Records
- Members: Markku "Make" Kivistö; Mikko Kivistö; Aki Kuusinen; Tuomas Kuusinen; Tomy Laisto; Lauri Heikkinen
- Website: www.painconfessor.com

Pain Confessor is a Finnish melodic death metal band from Hämeenlinna. It was established in August 2002 and by October 2003 were signed to the Finnish Megamania record label for a three-album deal, a relation that ended in 2008. The band is now signed to Spinefarm Records with whom they released their album Incarcerated.

Besides Finland, and being featured in Tuska Open Air Metal Festival, the band is also popular in Japan after its tour in 2006 together with Amoral, another Finnish metal band.

== Music history ==
The band commenced as a musical entity in 2002, with their first release, Promo 2003, a demo, that was released independently in 2003, They signed to Megamania, where they released a studio album, Turmoil, on September 8, 2004. It was followed up by a second album in 2006, Fearrage.

== Members ==
The band members are:

- Markku "Make" Kivistö - vocals
- Mikko Kivistö - bass, backing vocals
- Aki Kuusinen - drums
- Tuomas Kuusinen - guitar
- Tomy Laisto - guitar
- Lauri Heikkinen - keyboards

== Discography ==
=== Albums ===
- 2004: Turmoil
- 2006: Fearrage (FIN #26)
- 2007: Purgatory of the Second Sun (FIN #15)
- 2012: Incarcerated (FIN #28)

=== Singles ===
- 2004: "Poor Man's Crown"
- 2006: "Fall is Evil Days" (FIN #6)
- 2007: "Ne Plus Ultra" (FIN #1)

Others

- 2004: "Lake of Regret"

=== Demos ===
- 2003: Promo '03
- 2008: Demo 2008
- 2009: Demo 2009
