= Bloodred Hourglass =

Finnish melodic death metal band

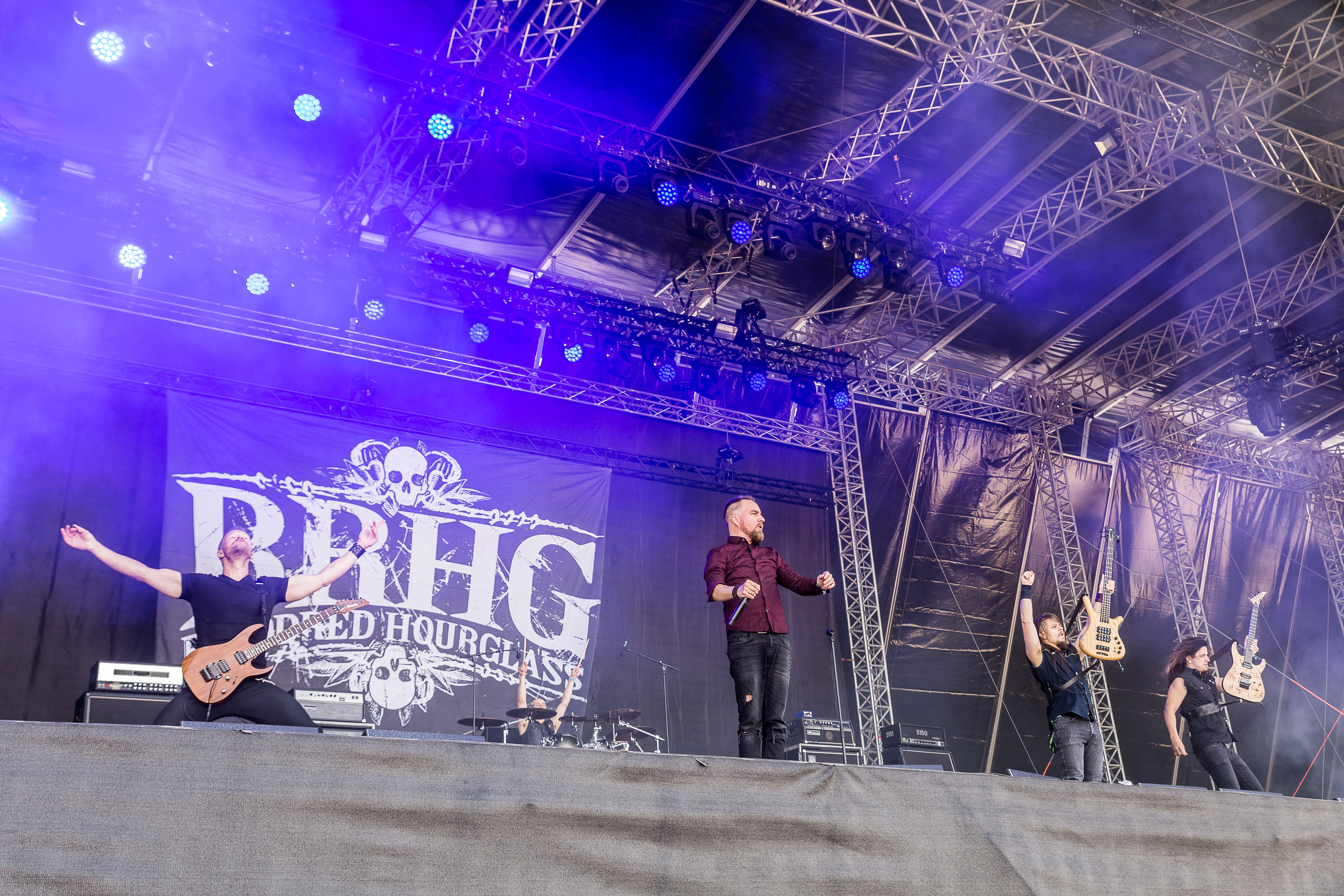
- Bloodred Hourglass at Rockharz Open Air 2019 in Germany

Background information
- Also known as: BRHG
- Origin: Mikkeli, Finland
- Genres: Melodic death metal, metalcore, thrash metal, groove metal, alternative metal
- Years active: 2005–present
- Labels: Spinefarm, OneManArmy, Ranka Kustannus, Out of Line
- Members: Jaredi Koukonen; Jose Moilanen; Jarkko Hyvönen; Lauri Silvonen; Joni Lahdenkauppi; Eero Silvonen
- Past members: Ilkka Jähi; Antti Nenonen; Jarkko Tiilikainen
- Website: brhg.net

Bloodred Hourglass (abbreviated BRHG) is a Finnish melodic death metal band from Mikkeli, formed in 2005. They have released seven studio albums.

== History ==
Founded in 2005, the band released a demo and three EPs in the following years. They attracted particular attention with their 2010 EP Deviant Grace. The band then recorded their debut album Lifebound, completing the recordings in 2011. In 2012, the band signed a contract with Spinefarm Records and released Lifebound in the same year. In 2022, singer Jarkko Koukonen officially changed his first name to Jaredi.

== Musical style ==
No Clean Singing compared the sound of the band's early albums to Lamb of God. Their more recent albums feature modern melodic death metal with synthesizers, melancholic parts, and a mix of guttural, screamed, and clean vocals. AllMusic said the group plays "complex, melodic death metal [that] incorporates elements of metalcore, alternative, and groove metal."

== Members ==
=== Current ===
- Jaredi (formerly Jarkko) Koukonen – vocals (2005–present)
- Jose Moilanen – bass (2005–present)
- Jarkko Hyvönen – drums (2005–present)
- Lauri Silvonen – guitars (2014–present)
- Joni Lahdenkauppi – guitars (2019–present)
- Eero Silvonen – guitars (2021–present)

=== Former ===
- Ilkka Jähi – guitars (2005–2007)
- Antti Nenonen – guitars, keyboards (2005–2019)
- Jarkko Tiilikainen – guitars (2007–2013)

== Discography ==
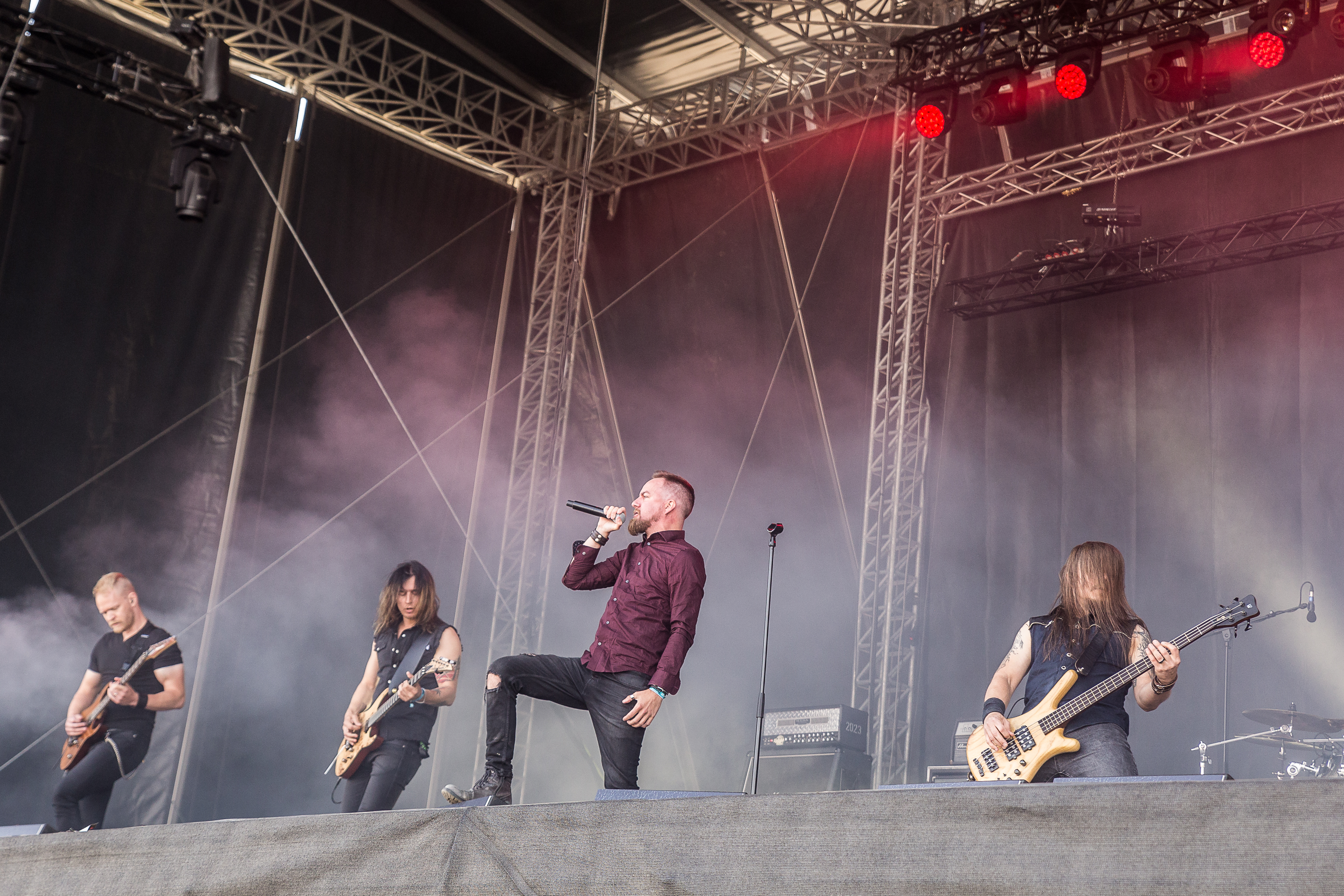
Bloodred Hourglass performing in 2019

=== Studio albums ===
- 2012: Lifebound
- 2015: Where the Oceans Burn
- 2017: Heal
- 2019: Godsend
- 2021: Your Highness
- 2023: How's the Heart?
- 2025: We Should Be Buried Like This

=== Singles ===
- 2019: "Waves of Black"
- 2019: "The Unfinished Story"
- 2021: "Drag Me the Rain"
- 2021: "Veritas"
- 2021: "Nightmares Are Dreams Too"
- 2022: "In Lieu of Flowers"
- 2023: "The Sun Still in Me"
- 2023: "The End We Start From"
- 2023: "How's the Heart?"
- 2025: "We Should Be Buried Like This"

=== Other releases ===
- 2006: Relevant Annihilation (demo)
- 2008: Under the Black Flag (EP)
- 2009: Verdict (EP)
- 2010: Deviant Grace (EP)
