= Tracedawn =

Finnish melodic death metal band

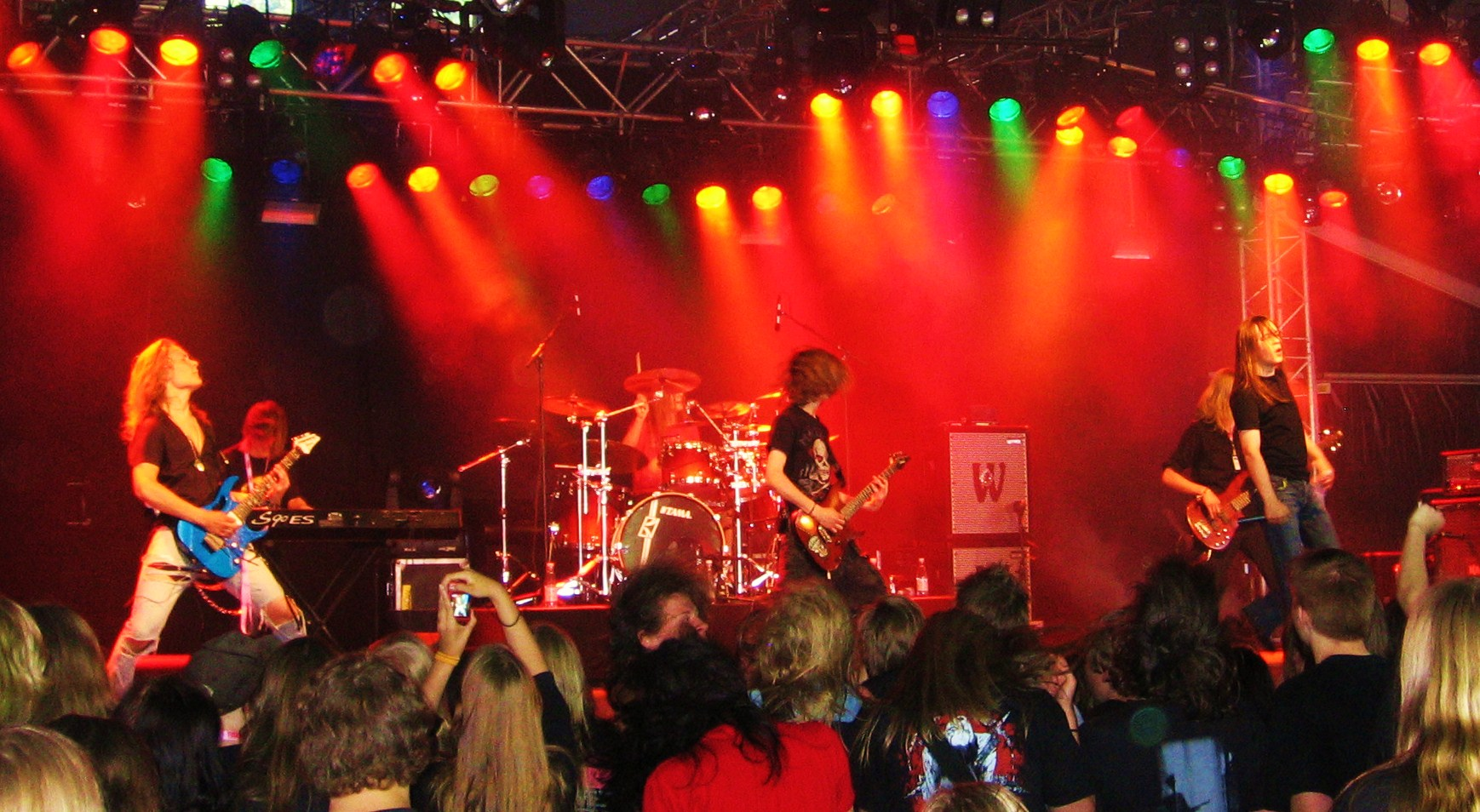
- Tracedawn at Tuska 2008, Helsinki

Background information
- Origin: Finland
- Genres: Melodic death metal
- Years active: 2005–Hiatus
- Labels: Redhouse Finland Music Publishing
- Members: Tuomas Yli-Jaskari; Perttu Kurttila; Vili Itäpelto; Roni Seppänen; Jonne Lindqvist
- Past members: Henkka Vahtere; Jeremy Qvick; Antti Lappalainen; Pekko Heikkilä; Niko Kalliojärvi
- Website: Official homepage

Tracedawn is a Finnish melodic death metal band created in 2005 by guitarist/vocalist Tuomas Yli-Jaskari.

== Biography ==
In 2005, Tuomas Yli-Jaskari created a project that would be named "Moravia" and eventually Tracedawn. He started by creating the instrumental version of a song that would eventually become Without Walls (from their self-titled debut album). He then found five other members and together they recorded a well-received demo album entitled Path of Reality. In late 2007, they signed a contract with Redhouse Finland Music Publishing, after which they released a four-song EP. They then released their self-titled debut album in 2008. The following year, their second album, Ego Anthem, was released, along with a single entitled In Your Name. The new album was supported with a tour across Europe with several famous Finnish metal bands, including Ensiferum and Stratovarius. After the tour, singer Antti Lappalainen left the band for personal reasons. The band later found Niko Kalliojärvi, former singer of the technical death metal band Amoral, as their new vocalist. With this new singer, the band released their third album Lizard Dusk in February 2012. On this album, the clean vocals are sung by Yli-Jaskari and the growl vocals are sung by Kalliojärvi.

== Members ==
=== Current members ===
- Tuomas Yli-Jaskari – guitar, vocals (2007–present)
- Perttu Kurttila – drums (2007–present)
- Vili Itäpelto – keyboards (2007–present)
- Roni Seppänen – guitar (2009–present)
- Jonne Lindqvist – bass (2012–present)

=== Past members ===
- Henkka Vahtere – bass (2007)
- Jeremy Qvick – guitar (2007–2008)
- Antti Lappalainen – vocals (2007–2011)
- Pekko Heikkilä – bass (2008–2012)
- Niko Kalliojärvi – vocals (2011–2013)

== Discography ==
=== Demo albums ===
- Path of Reality

=== Studio albums ===
- Tracedawn (2008)
- Ego Anthem (2009)
- Lizard Dusk (2012)

=== EPs ===
- Arabian Nights (2012)

=== Singles ===
- In Your Name (2009)

=== Music videos ===
- Without Walls
- In Your Name
- The Forsaken
- Breed Insane
- Machine
- Arabian Nights Unplugged
