= Rytmihäiriö =

Finnish band

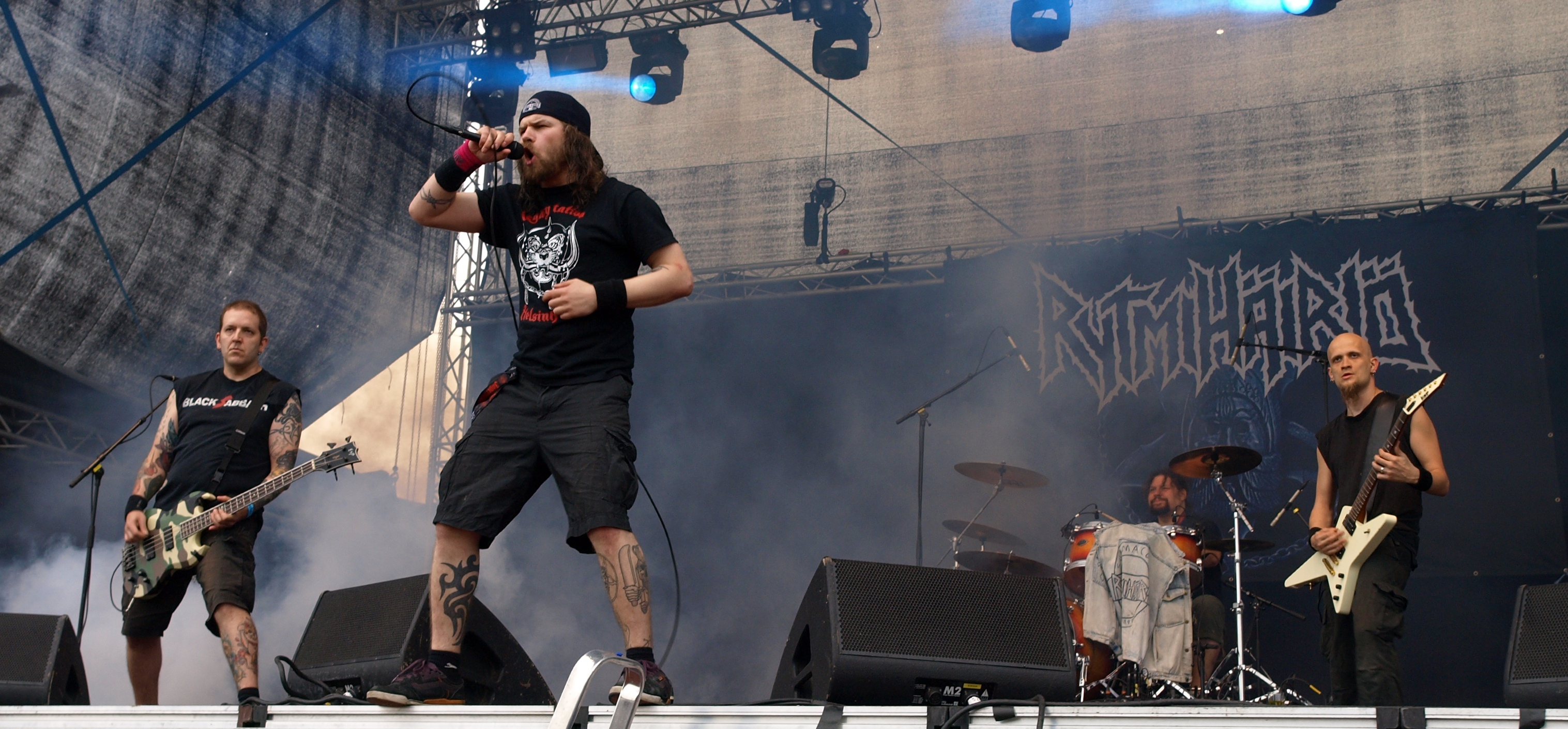
- Rytmihäiriö in Myötätuulirock in 2011

Background information
- Origin: Helsinki, Finland
- Years active: 1988–1992; 1998–present
- Members: Unto Helo; Janne Perttilä; Antti Kiiski; Jukka "Kosmo" Kröger
- Past members: Otto Luotonen; Kalle Ellilä; Silveri; Tuukka Laitinen; EQ; Nastis; Samppa
- Website: surmacore.com

Rytmihäiriö (Finnish for 'arrhythmia') is a Finnish hardcore punk, thrash metal/crossover thrash, grindcore and surmacore Helsinki-based band established in 1988 until 1992, when the band was put on a hiatus. It had a comeback in 1998 with a number of changes in the line-up. The band is signed to Sakara Records, and for distribution Sony.

Band has taken their main inspiration from the occult, devil worship, Finnish mixed drink Gambina and Finnish crime magazine Alibi.

== Members ==
Current lineup

- Unto "Une" Helo – vocals (2002–present)
- Janne Perttilä – guitars (1998–present)
- Antti Kiiski – bass (1988-1992, 1998–present)
- Jukka "Kosmo" Kröger – drums (2017–present)

Original band

- Kalle Ellilä, vocals (1988-1989, died 2003) - replaced by
  - Pate Vuorio, vocals (1989–1991, 1998-2002) - replaced by
  - Silveri, vocals (1991-1992)
  - Marko Karimo, vocals (1991–1992)
- Tuukka Laitinen, guitar (first period, 1988–1989) - replaced by
  - EQ, guitar (1989) replaced by
  - Nastis, guitar (1989–90), replaced by
  - Tuukka Laitinen, guitar (second period 1990-1991) -replaced by
  - Samppa (guitar, 1991–1992)
- Antti Kiiski – bass (1988-1992, 1998-)
- Otto Luotonen – drums (1988-1992, 1998-2016)

== Discography ==
Studio albums

Year	Album	Charts
Year	Album	FIN
1991	Surman siipien havinaa	33
2005	Saatana on herra	
2006	Seitsemän surman siunausliitto	36
2008	Sarvet, sorkat, salatieteet	10
2010	Surmantuoja	6
2013	Todellisuuden mestari	4
2018	Gambinapsykoosi	5
2023	Surmacore	12

Compilation albums

- 1991: Möfaa puujumalille (self-published)
- 2003: Surman vuodet – The Homicide Years (Mörri Records)

Split albums

- 1992: The End of Evolution... ...is Round the Corner (Spinefarm Records)
  - The End of Evolution... - by Rytmihäiriö
  - ...is Round the Corner - by Amen
- 2004: Chaosbreed / Rytmihäiriö (Homorock Records)
  - Chaosbreed - by Chaosbreed
  - Rytmihäiriö - by Rytmihäiriö

EPs

- 1990: Surmatyö (Surmatyö Records)
- 1990: Ihmisiä kuolee! (Spinefarm Records)
- 2003: Surmaa kännissä (Hukkalevyt, free download)

Collaboration - Singles as Mokoma / Rytmihäiriö / Stam1na

Year	Album	Charts
Year	Album	FIN
2007	"Sakara Tour 2006 Nosturi"	7
2007	"Sakara Tour 2006 Työnkulma"	8
2007	"Sakara Tour 2006 Rytmikorjaamo"	9
2007	"Sakara Tour 2006 Tivoli"	11
2007	"Sakara Tour 2006 Teatria"	12
2007	"Sakara Tour 2006 Lutakko"	14
2007	"Sakara Tour 2006 Sibeliustalo"	16
