= Machine Men (band) =

Finnish heavy metal band

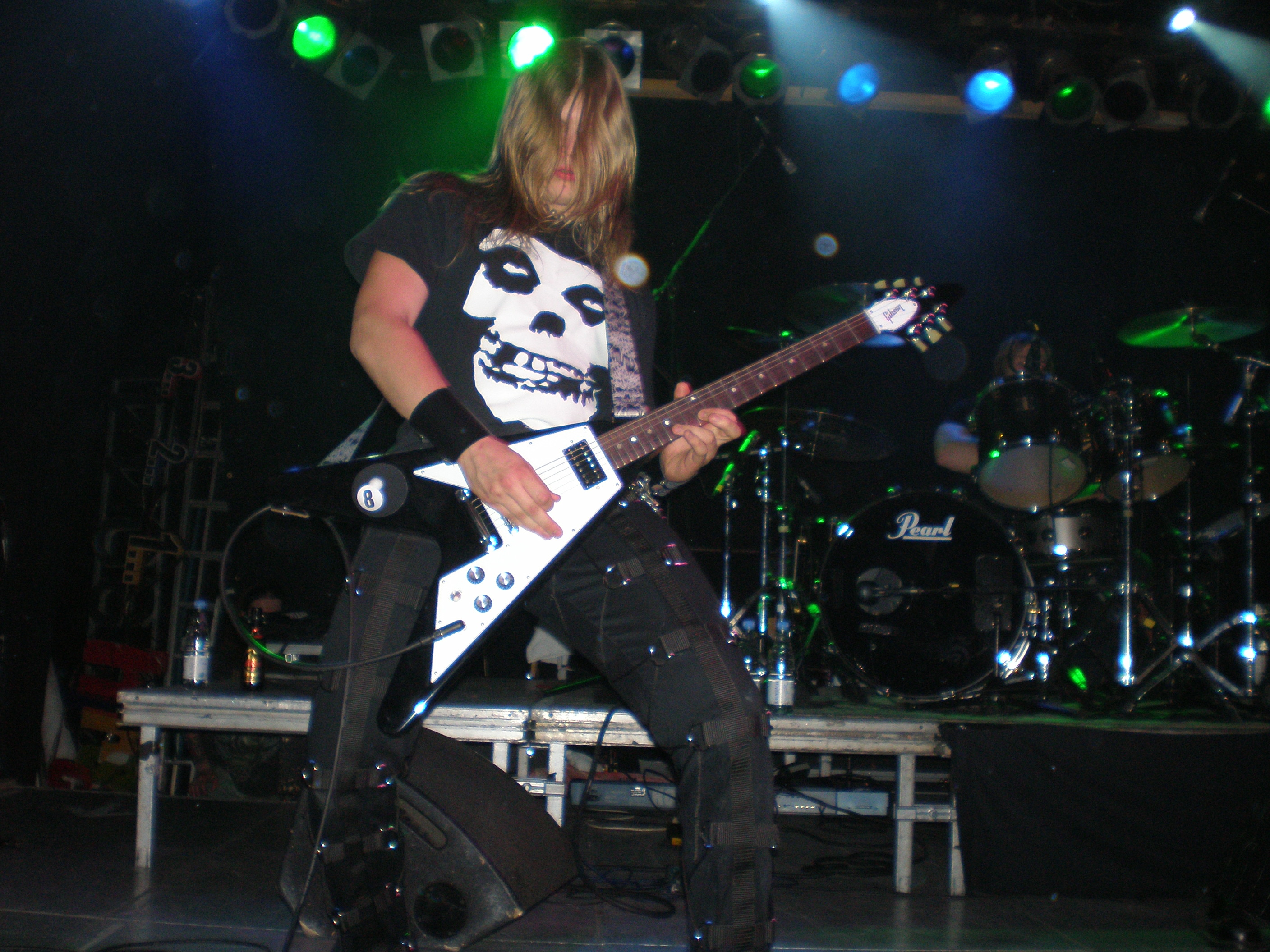
- Machine Men guitarist J-V Hintikka live at the Earthshaker Roadshock Tour 2007 in Nürnberg

Background information
- Origin: Suolahti, Finland
- Genres: Heavy metal Power metal
- Years active: 1998-2011
- Labels: Century Media
- Past members: Toni Parviainen; Jani Noronen; J-V Hintikka; Eero Vehniäinen; Jarno Parantainen
- Website: Official Site

Machine Men was a Finnish heavy metal band that originally formed as an Iron Maiden cover band.

Vocalist Toni Parviainen started singing in 1998, with inspiration from Bruce Dickinson. Machine Men took their name from a song present on Dickinson's 1998 album "The Chemical Wedding".

After a two-year hiatus, the band broke up in February 2011 due to lack of interest from the members.

== Former Band members ==
- Toni "Antony" Parviainen - Vocals
- Turbo J-V - Guitar
- Jani Noronen - Guitar
- Eero Vehniäinen - Bass
- Jarno Parantainen - Drums

== Discography ==
=== Machine Men (EP) (2002) ===
- Men Inside the Machine
- Eye of the Truth
- The Slave Trade
- Enjoy Insanity
- Aces High (Iron Maiden Cover)

=== Scars & Wounds (2003) ===
- Against the Freaks
- The Gift
- The Beginning of the End
- Silver Dreams
- Man in Chains
- Betrayed by Angels
- Victim
- Scars & Wounds
- Men Inside the Machine - Japanese Bonus Track
- Eye of the Truth - Japanese Bonus Track

-There is a hidden track (03:44) after "Scars & Wounds" which seems to be a reprise of the title track.

-Some versions have the "Machine Men" EP as bonus tracks (the Russian version e.g.)

=== Elegies (2005) ===
- Falling
- Dream and Religion
- Apathy
- Back from the Days
- The Traitor
- October
- Daytime Theatre
- Doors of Resurrection
- From Sunrise to Sunset
- Freak (Bruce Dickinson Cover)
- Dream & Religion (industrial ver.) - Limited Edition Bonus Track

=== Circus of Fools (2007) ===
- Circus of Fools
- No Talk Without the Giant
- Ghost of the Seasons
- Tyrannize
- The Shadow Gallery
- Where I Stand
- Border of the Real World
- Dying Without a Name
- Cardinal Point
- Till' the End of Her Days - Japanese Bonus Track
- October (Acoustic ver.) - Japanese Bonus Track
