= Deathchain =

Finnish deathrash band

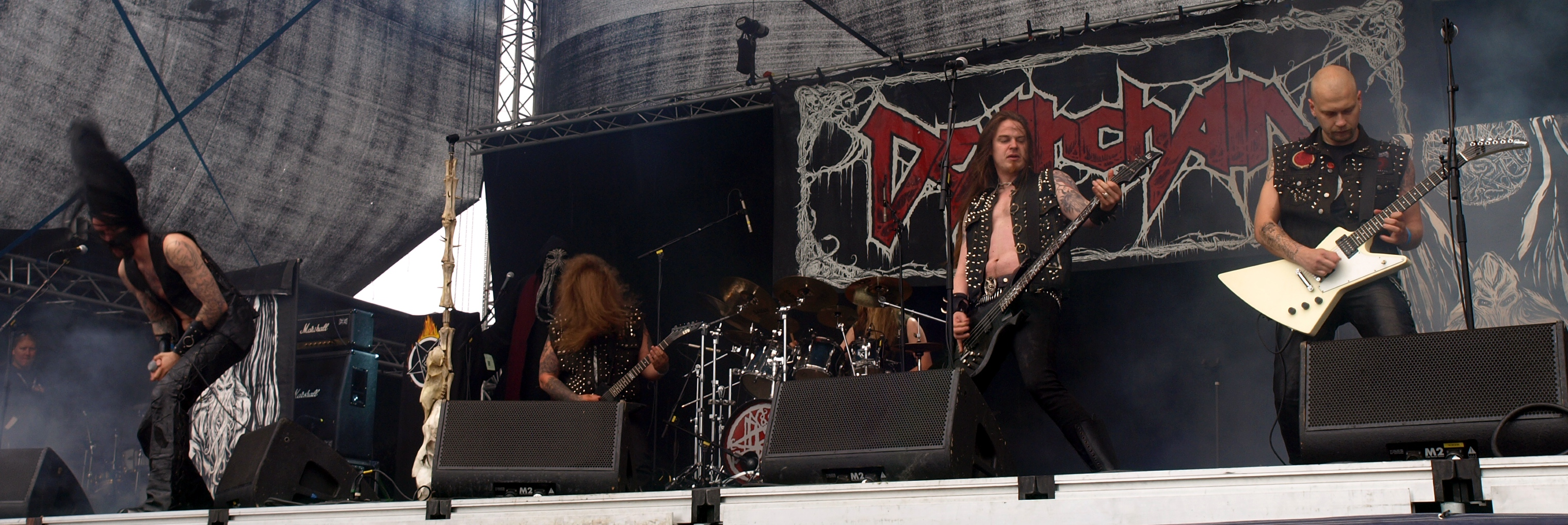
- Deathchain live at Myötätuulirock 2011

Background information
- Also known as: Winterwolf
- Origin: Kuopio, Finland
- Genre: Deathrash
- Years active: 1997–present
- Label: Dynamic Arts
- Members: K.J. Khaos; Corpse; Kuolio; Leper; Kassara
- Past members: Possessed Keripukki; Telaketju; Rotten; Bobby Undertaker; C.Void; Cult
- Website: deathchain.com

Deathchain is a band hailing from Kuopio, Finland, known for its blend of old school death and thrash metal. The band originally started under the name Winterwolf in 1997, before evolving into Deathchain in 2001 following lineup changes and a shift in musical direction.

The band’s sound combines vicious old school thrash, crushing death/black metal, satanic horror,and war-themed aesthetics. Their style has often been compared to bands such as Slayer and early Deicide.

== Band members ==
=== Current ===
- K.J. Khaos (Kai Jaakkola) – vocals
- Corpse – guitar
- Leper – guitar
- Kuolio – bass
- Kassara – drums

=== Former ===
- Possessed Keripukki – bass
- Telaketju – drums
- Rotten – vocals
- Bobby Undertaker – guitar
- C.Void – Backing Vocals
- Cult - guitar

== Discography ==
=== As Winterwolf ===
- Death... Will Come Your Way (Demo, 2000)
- Blood for Death (Demo, 2001)
- Cycle of the Werewolf (Studio album, 2009)
- Lycanthropic Metal of Death (Studio album, 2019)

=== As Deathchain ===
- Poltergeist (Demo, 2002)
- Deadmeat Disciples (2003)
- Deathchain / Deathbound (2005)
- Deathrash Assault (2005)
- Cult of Death (2007)
- Death Eternal (2008)
- Death Gods (2010)
- Ritual Death Metal (2013)
