= Amorphis discography =

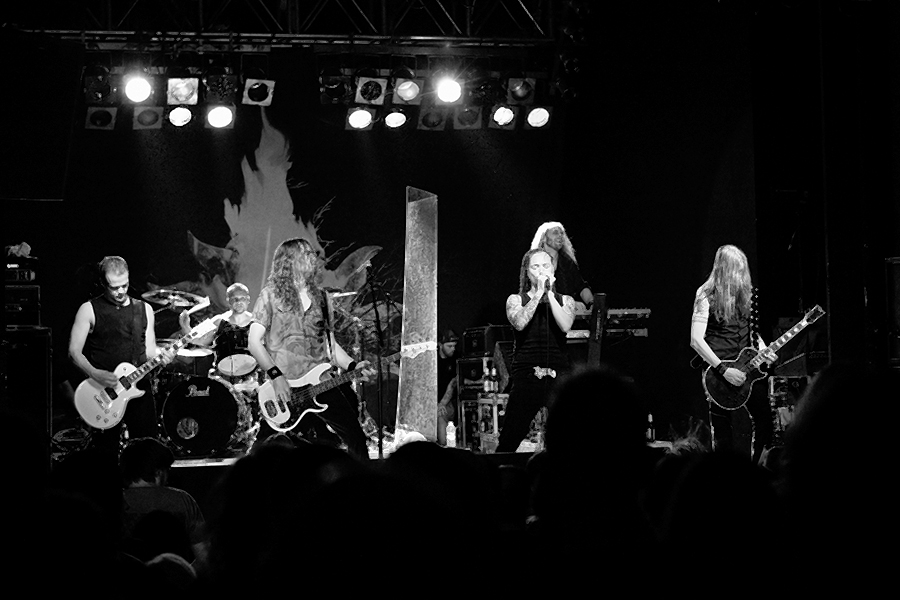
- Amorphis in 2009
- Studio albums: 15
- EPs: 3
- Live albums: 5
- Compilation albums: 6
- Singles: 19
- Video albums: 1
- Music videos: 26

The discography of Amorphis, a Finnish progressive metal band, consists of fourteen studio albums, five live albums, sixteen singles, three extended plays, and six compilation albums.

Amorphis was founded by Jan Rechberger, Tomi Koivusaari, and Esa Holopainen in 1990.

== Albums ==
=== Studio albums ===
Title	Album details	Peak chart positions									Sales	Certifications
Title	Album details	FIN	AUT	FRA	GER	HUN	JPN	SWE	SWI	US Heat	Sales	Certifications
The Karelian Isthmus	Released: 1 November 1992; Label: Relapse; Formats: CD, CS, LP, DL	—	—	—	—	—	—	—	—	—		
Tales from the Thousand Lakes	Released: 12 July 1994; Label: Relapse Records; Formats: CD, CS, LP, DL	—	—	—	—	—	—	—	—	—	Worldwide: 250,000	
Elegy	Released: 14 May 1996; Label: Relapse; Formats: CD, CS, LP, DL	8	—	—	67	—	78	—	—	—	Worldwide: 130,000; US: 15,100	
Tuonela	Released: 29 March 1999; Label: Relapse; Formats: CD, CS, LP, DL	8	—	—	46	—	—	—	—	—	US: 12,765	
Am Universum	Released: 3 April 2001; Label: Relapse; Formats: CD, CS, LP, DL	4	—	—	75	—	—	—	—	—	US: 7,757	
Far from the Sun	Released: 26 May 2003; Label: Virgin, EMI; Formats: CD, CS, LP, DL	7	—	—	—	—	—	—	—	—	FIN: 15,000	FIN: Gold
Eclipse	Released: 15 February 2006; Label: Nuclear Blast; Formats: CD, LP, DL	1	69	—	56	29	160	—	—	—	FIN: 16,247; US: 700	FIN: Gold
Silent Waters	Released: 29 August 2007; Label: Nuclear Blast; Formats: CD, LP, DL	3	49	—	44	—	74	—	52	—	FIN: 19,998	FIN: Gold
Skyforger	Released: 27 May 2009; Label: Nuclear Blast; Formats: CD, LP, DL	1	74	—	55	—	65	—	48	33	FIN: 18,620; US: 1,300	FIN: Gold
The Beginning of Times	Released: 25 May 2011; Label: Nuclear Blast; Formats: CD, LP, DL	1	41	—	16	—	37	—	32	25	US: 1,800	
Circle	Released: 19 April 2013; Label: Nuclear Blast; Formats: CD, CD+DVD, LP, DL	1	24	141	13	13	39	33	57	11	FIN: 10,000; US: 2,000	FIN: Gold
Under the Red Cloud	Released: 4 September 2015; Label: Nuclear Blast; Formats: CD, CS, LP, DL	2	20	85	10	25	38	—	11	5		
Queen of Time	Released: 18 May 2018; Label: Nuclear Blast; Formats: CD, LP, DL	1	11	84	4	16	45	45	3	3	FIN: 10,000	FIN: Gold
Halo	Released: 11 February 2022; Label: Atomic Fire; Formats: CD, LP, DL	1	7	—	3	—	57	42	4	—		
Borderland	Released: 26 September 2025; Label: Reigning Phoenix Music; Formats: CD, LP, DL	1	7	—	4	—	—	—	10	—		
"—" denotes a release that did not chart.

=== Live albums ===
Title	Album details	Peak chart positions		
Title	Album details	FIN	GER	SWI
Forging the Land of Thousand Lakes	Released: 7 July 2010; Label: Nuclear Blast; Formats: CD+DVD, Blu-ray	—	46	—
An Evening with Friends at Huvila	Released: 24 February 2017; Label: Nuclear Blast; Formats: LP, DL	—	—	—
Live at Helsinki Ice Hall	Released: 21 May 2021; Label: Nuclear Blast; Formats: CD, LP	6	54	49
Queen of Time (Live at Tavastia 2021)	Released: 13 October 2023; Label: Nuclear Blast; Formats: CD, LP	14	60	—
Tales from the Thousand Lakes (Live at Tavastia)	Released: 12 July 2024; Label: Reigning Phoenix Music; Formats: CD, LP	—	—	—

=== Compilation albums ===
Title	Album details	Peak chart positions		
Title	Album details	FIN	HUN	JPN
Story – 10th Anniversary	Released: 10 May 2000; Labels: Spinefarm, Relapse; Formats: CD	—	—	—
Chapters	Released: 17 June 2003; Label: Relapse; Formats: CD+DVD	—	—	—
Magic & Mayhem – Tales from the Early Years	Released: 17 September 2010; Label: Nuclear Blast; Formats: CD, LP	8	6	160
Best of Amorphis	Released: 13 August 2013; Label: Nuclear Blast; Formats: DL	—	—	—
His Story – Best Of	Released: 2 September 2016; Label: Nuclear Blast; Formats: CD	—	—	—
Rarities 1991–2001	Released: 3 September 2024; Label: Relapse; Formats: CD, LP, DL	28	—	—
"—" denotes a release that did not chart.

== Extended plays ==
Title	EP details
Privilege of Evil	Released: 5 December 1993; Label: Relapse; Formats: CD, CS, LP
Black Winter Day	Released: 31 January 1995; Label: Relapse; Formats: CD, LP, DL
My Kantele	Released: 27 May 1997; Label: Relapse; Formats: CD, CS, DL

== Singles ==
Year	Title	Peak chart positions	Album
Year	Title	FIN	Album
1999	"Divinity"	3	Tuonela
2001	"Alone"	1	Am Universum
2003	"Day of Your Beliefs"	3	Far from the Sun
2003	"Evil Inside"	20	Far from the Sun
2006	"House Of Sleep"	1	Eclipse
2006	"The Smoke"	20	Eclipse
2007	"Silent Waters"	2	Silent Waters
2009	"Silver Bride"	1	Skyforger
2009	"From the Heaven of My Heart"	—	Skyforger
2011	"You I Need"	—	The Beginning of Times
2013	"Hopeless Days"	19	Circle
2013	"The Wanderer"	—	Circle
2015	"Death of a King"	—	Under the Red Cloud
2015	"Sacrifice"	—	Under the Red Cloud
2018	"Honeyflow"	—	Queen of Time
2022	"On the Dark Waters"	—	Halo
2025	"Light and Shadow"	—	Borderland
2025	"Bones"	—	Borderland
2025	"Dancing Shadow"	—	Borderland
"—" denotes a release that did not chart.

== Demos ==
Title	Demo details
Disment of Soul	Released: 4 January 1991; Label: self-released; Formats: CS

== Video albums ==
Title	Video details	Peak chart positions	
Title	Video details	FIN	HUN
Forging the Land of Thousand Lakes	Released: 9 July 2010; Label: Nuclear Blast; Formats: DVD	1	16

== Music videos ==
Year	Title	Directed	Album
1995	"Black Winter Day"	—	Tales from the Thousand Lakes
1996	"Against Widows"	—	Elegy
1997	"My Kantele"	—	Elegy
1999	"Divinity"	Matt Zerman	Tuonela
2001	"Alone"	—	Am Universum
2003	"Evil Inside"	Taku Kaskela	Far from the Sun
2006	"The Smoke"	—	Eclipse
2006	"House of Sleep"	Owe Lingvall	Eclipse
2007	"Silent Waters"	—	Silent Waters
2009	"Silver Bride"	Owe Lingvall, Mirka Rantanen	Skyforger
2010	"From the Heaven of My Heart"	Owe Lingwall	Skyforger
2011	"You I Need"	Oliver Sommer	The Beginning of Times
2013	"Hopeless Days"	Patrick Ullaeus	Circle
2013	"Nightbird's Song"	Denis Goria	Circle
2013	"The Wanderer"	Patric Ullaeus	Circle
2015	"Sacrifice"	—	Under the Red Cloud
2015	"Death of a King"	—	Under the Red Cloud
2016	"The Four wise Ones"	—	Under the Red Cloud
2017	"Bad Blood"	—	Under the Red Cloud
2018	"Wrong Direction"	—	Queen of Time
2018	"Amongst Stars"	—	Queen of Time
2022	"The Moon"	—	Halo
2022	"On the Dark Waters"	—	Halo
2025	"Light and Shadow"	—	Borderland
2025	"Bones"	—	Borderland
2025	"Dancing Shadow"	—	Borderland
2025	"Fog to Fog"	—	Borderland
