= Chapters (Amorphis album) =

Compilation album by Amorphis
- Released: 17 June 2003
- Recorded: May 1992 – December 2000
- Genre: Death/doom, melodic death metal, progressive metal, progressive rock
- Length: 77:11
- Label: Relapse
- Producer: Simon Effemey, Tomas Skogsberg, Matthew F. Jacobson (exec)

Amorphis chronology
| Far from the Sun (2003) | Chapters (2003) | Eclipse (2006) |

Professional ratings
Review scores
| Source | Rating |
|---|---|
| AllMusic | 4.5/5 stars |

Chapters is the second compilation album by Finnish progressive metal band Amorphis, released in 2003. The first disc is a CD containing some of their most popular songs, and the second disc is a bonus DVD featuring the music videos recorded to promote their music.

== Track listing ==
All tracks by Amorphis.

=== Disc one ===
| No. | Title | Original album | Length |
|---|---|---|---|
| 1. | "Alone" | Am Universum | 4:23 |
| 2. | "Drifting Memories" | Am Universum | 4:24 |
| 3. | "Too Much to See" | "Alone" (single) | 3:41 |
| 4. | "The Way" | Tuonela | 4:35 |
| 5. | "Northern Lights" | "Divinity / Northern Lights" (single) | 3:17 |
| 6. | "Summer's End" | Tuonela | 5:37 |
| 7. | "The Brother-Slayer" | My Kantele | 3:37 |
| 8. | "Better Unborn" | Elegy | 5:52 |
| 9. | "My Kantele" | Elegy | 5:03 |
| 10. | "Weeper on the Shore" | Elegy | 4:52 |
| 11. | "Moon and Sun" | Black Winter Day | 3:36 |
| 12. | "Black Winter Day" | Tales from the Thousand Lakes | 3:50 |
| 13. | "The Castaway" | Tales from the Thousand Lakes | 5:32 |
| 14. | "Drowned Maid" | Tales from the Thousand Lakes | 4:23 |
| 15. | "Warriors Trial" | The Karelian Isthmus | 5:04 |
| 16. | "Exile of the Sons of Uisliu" | The Karelian Isthmus | 3:43 |
| 17. | "The Lost Name of God" | The Karelian Isthmus | 5:32 |
| Total length: | | | 77:11 |

=== Disc two – DVD ===
| No. | Title | Original album | Length |
|---|---|---|---|
| 1. | "Alone" | "Alone" (single) | 4:23 |
| 2. | "Divinity" | Tuonela | 4:55 |
| 3. | "My Kantele" | Elegy | 5:05 |
| 4. | "Against Widows" | Elegy | 4:05 |
| 5. | "Black Winter Day" | Tales from the Thousand Lakes | 3:51 |
| Total length: | | | 22:19 |

== Personnel ==
=== Amorphis ===
- Esa Holopainen – lead guitar
- Tomi Koivusaari – rhythm guitar, growled vocals (disc 1: 7–17, disc 2: 4–5)
- Niclas Etelävuori – bass guitar (disc 1: 1 & 2, disc 2: 1)
- Santeri Kallio – keyboards (disc 1: 1–6, disc 2: 1 & 2)
- Pasi Koskinen – clean vocals (disc 1: 1–10, disc 2: 1–4), growled vocals (disc 1: 5)
- Jan Rechberger – drums (disc 1: 11–17, disc 2: 5), keyboards (disc 1: 15–17)

=== Additional musicians ===
- Pekka Kasari – drums (disc 1: 1–10, disc 2: 1–4)
- Olli-Pekka Laine – bass guitar (disc 1: 3–17, disc 2: 2–5)
- Kim Rantala – keyboards (disc 1: 7–10, disc 2: 3 & 4)
- Kasper Mårtenson – keyboards (disc 1: 11–14, disc 2: 5)

=== Other personnel ===
- Dean D. Edington Jr. – Project Coordinator
- Scott Hull – Remastering
- Mikko Karmila – Engineer
- Orion Landau – Cover Design
- Don Poe – Mastering
- Gavin Price – Design
- Tomas Skogsberg – Engineer
