= Mannhai =

Finnish band

- Origin: Helsinki, Finland
- Genres: Stoner rock
- Years active: 1999–2009 (on hold)
- Labels: Spinefarm Records, Bull's Eye Records
- Members: Olli-Pekka Laine; Ilkka Laaksomaa; Pasi Koskinen
- Past members: Mikko Pietinen; Jani Muurinen; Kasper Mårtenson

Mannhai is a Finnish stoner rock band from Helsinki. The band was formed in late 1999 by bass player Olli-Pekka "Oppu" Laine and guitarist Ilkka "Ile" Laaksomaa. Soon they were accompanied by a drummer, Mikko "Junior" Pietinen, and the following year by lead singer Jani "Joãnitor" Muurinen.

In 2004, Muurinen left the band after three albums. In 2005 Mannhai persuaded Pasi Koskinen to replace Muurinen as a vocalist. Koskinen is best known for being the lead singer of Amorphis during the years 1996–2004.

The band's name Mannhai comes from an Indian belief. In the countryside of the state of Uttar Pradesh in India, people in villages believed an evil disguised spirit called the Mannhai snatched their children at nightfall.

== History ==
Olli-Pekka Laine, Ilkka Laaksomaa and Mikko Pietinen initially recorded three instrumental songs. With this demo tape, they convinced their old friend Jani Muurinen to become their singer. In late 2000 another three-song demo tape was released and given to Spinefarm Records which led to the band signing a recording contract. Without a single live gig, Mannhai started to record their first album.

Their debut album The Sons of Yesterday's Black Grouse was released in 2001. Mannhai started intense touring until August 2002, when they returned to the studio to record their second record. With the second album Evil under the Sun, Mannhai topped its predecessor.

In 2004 the band's third album, The Exploder, was released. It contains influences from progressive metal and 1970s heavy metal, as well as from blues, with Maria Hänninen singing backing vocals on some tracks and Esa Kuloniemi from Honey B and the T-bones playing slide guitar on some others.

In November 2004 in Tavastia Club, a rock venue in Helsinki, Muurinen played his last gig as a member of Mannhai. Muurinen left the band to pursue his artistic studies. During this time Muurinen had lived and studied in Turku while the rest of the band had always maintained their home base in Helsinki.

In the spring of 2005 Mannhai got a new lead singer, Trond Skog, the previous vocalist for Norwegian stoner rock band Honcho. Mannhai went on a three-week Central European tour. However, in the middle of the tour the band relieved Skog from his singing duties. Without a vocalist, Laine called his old bandmate Pasi Koskinen from Amorphis. To his surprise Koskinen agreed and flew to Berlin to step into the frontman's shoes. After the tour he officially joined the band.

With the new line-up, Mannhai started to work on a new album, with Koskinen writing most of the lyrics. The group's fourth album, Hellroad Caravan, came out in the beginning of 2006. The third track, "Spaceball", went to the top of the Finnish singles charts. Henri Sorvali, best known for his work in folk/pagan metal band Moonsorrow, played keyboards on the record.

In late 2006, drummer Junior Pietinen left the band to work full-time on his other groups Bleak and Happiness. For the forthcoming European tour Mannhai added Nalle Österman as a sideman for drums.Österman has worked with Oppu Laine in the death metal band Chaosbreed as well.

After Pietinen departed the band, Mannhai has only played a few gigs per year, most of them abroad at festivals like Ragnarock Open Air Festival. No new music has been composed or published as a band since 2007. With Mannhai inactive, Olli-Pekka Laine aimed his musical focus at a new band, Barren Earth, with previous Mannhai and Amorphis bandmate Kasper Mårtenson as keyboardist. Mannhai officially announced on their website in February 2009 that they are on indefinite hiatus.

== Members ==
Mannhai was formed by Oppu Laine and Ile Laaksomaa. Oppu Laine has played bass guitar in bands like Amorphis and Chaosbreed. Original vocalist Jani Muurinen (a.k.a. "Joãnitor" or "Janitor") used to be a singer in Xysma before Mannhai. Janitor's successor Pasi Koskinen, a former Amorphis member as well, has vocal duties in his other bands Shape of Despair and Ajattara. Mikko Pietinen ("Junior") moved on to play with his other bands Bleak (disbanded 2009) and Happiness. Tour drummer Nalle Österman has been in bands like Chaosbreed, Gandalf and Lullacry and is the drummer for Sonic Roots.

=== Current line-up ===
- Olli-Pekka "Oppu" Laine – bass guitar 1999-
- Ilkka "Ile" Laaksomaa – guitar 1999-
- Pasi Koskinen – vocals 2005-
- Nalle Österman – tour drummer 2006–

=== Former members ===
- Mikko "Junior" Pietinen – drums 1999–2006
- Jani "Joãnitor" Muurinen – vocals 2000–2004
- Kasper Mårtenson – keyboards 2003–2004

== Discography ==
=== Albums ===
- The Sons of Yesterday's Black Grouse (2001)
- Evil Under the Sun (2002)
- The Exploder (2004)
- Hellroad Caravan (2006)

=== Singles ===
- "Spiritraiser / "A New Day Yesterday" (Jethro Tull cover) (2003)
- "Rock to the Top" / "Slave to the Flame" / "Live Wire" (Mötley Crüe cover) (2004)
- "Spaceball" / "Rocketeer" (2005)
- "Under the Sign of the Wolf" (split single with Reverend Bizarre) "Forever My Queen" (Pentagram cover) (2006)

== Videography ==
- "Spiritraiser" – from the album Evil Under the Sun
- "Rock to the Top" – from the album The Exploder
- "Spaceball" – from the album Hellroad Caravan
