= Story (Amorphis album) =

Story: 10th Anniversary

Compilation album by Amorphis
- Released: 10 May 2000
- Recorded: May 1992, September 1993, 1996, October–November 1998
- Genre: Death/doom, melodic death metal, progressive metal
- Length: 72:40
- Label: Relapse, Spinefarm

Amorphis chronology
| Tuonela (1999) | Story: 10th Anniversary (2000) | Am Universum (2001) |

Professional ratings
Review scores
| Source | Rating |
|---|---|
| Allmusic | 4.5/5 stars |

Story: 10th Anniversary is the first compilation album by Finnish progressive metal band Amorphis. It was released in 2000 to commemorate the band's tenth anniversary.

== Track listing ==
| No. | Title | Original album | Length |
|---|---|---|---|
| 1. | "Black Winter Day" | Tales from the Thousand Lakes | 3:48 |
| 2. | "Against Widows" | Elegy | 4:04 |
| 3. | "Tuonela" | Tuonela | 4:37 |
| 4. | "Grail's Mysteries" | The Karelian Isthmus | 3:04 |
| 5. | "The Castaway" | Tales from the Thousand Lakes | 5:30 |
| 6. | "My Kantele" | My Kantele | 5:51 |
| 7. | "The Way" | Tuonela | 4:36 |
| 8. | "The Brother-Slayer" | My Kantele | 3:41 |
| 9. | "The Orphan" | Elegy | 5:16 |
| 10. | "Exile of the Sons of Uisliu" | The Karelian Isthmus | 3:45 |
| 11. | "On Rich and Poor" | Elegy | 5:17 |
| 12. | "Divinity" | Divinity / Northern Lights | 4:56 |
| 13. | "The Gathering" | The Karelian Isthmus | 4:14 |
| 14. | "Drowned Maid" | Tales from the Thousand Lakes | 4:11 |
| 15. | "Summer's End" | Tuonela | 5:29 |
| 16. | "Cares (Live)" | Elegy | 4:21 |
| Total length: | | | 72:40 |

== Credits ==
=== Amorphis ===
- Pasi Koskinen – vocals (2, 3, 6–9, 11, 12)
- Esa Holopainen – lead guitar, music (2)
- Tomi Koivusaari – rhythm guitar, vocals (1, 2, 4, 5, 10, 11, 13, & 14)
- Santeri Kallio – keyboards (3, 7 & 12)
- Pekka Kasari – drums (2, 3, 6–9, 11 & 12)

=== Additional musicians ===
- Olli-Pekka Laine – bass guitar
- Jan Rechberger – drums (1, 4, 5, 10, 13, & 14); keyboards (4, 10 & 13)

==== Keyboardists ====
- Kasper Mårtenson (1, 5, & 14), music (1,)
- Kim Rantala (2, 6, 8, 9 & 11)
