= Olli-Pekka Laine =

Finnish bassist

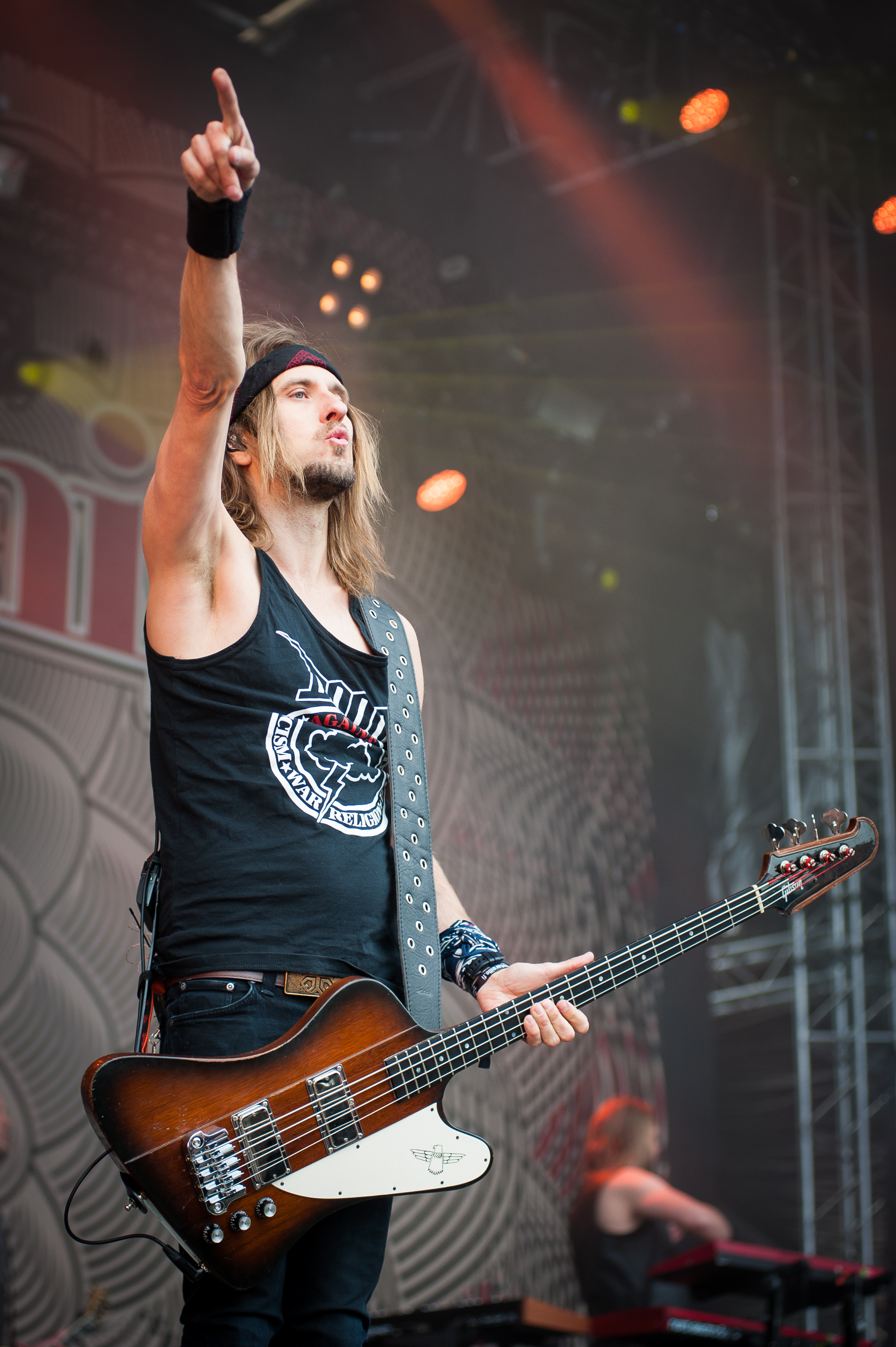
- Laine with Amorphis in 2018

Background information
- Also known as: Oppu, O–P Laine or Silveri
- Born: 5 February 1973 (age 52); Helsinki, Finland
- Genres: Stoner metal, stoner rock, death metal, progressive death metal, heavy metal, thrash metal
- Occupation: Musician
- Instruments: Bass
- Years active: 1990–present

Olli-Pekka Laine (born 5 February 1973) is a Finnish musician, currently serving as a bassist in the metal bands Amorphis (1990–2000, 2017–) and Barren Earth (2008–) Octoploid (2024–). He was also formerly part of other Finnish metal bands, Nuxvomica (1990), Rytmihäiriö (1991–1992), Mannhai (2001–2006, 2016), Chaosbreed (2003–2005) & Kiljuvelka-70.

== Discography ==
=== Amorphis ===
- Disment of Soul (1991)
- Untitled Amorphis Single (1991)
- The Karelian Isthmus (1992)
- Privilege of Evil (1993)
- Tales from the Thousand Lakes (1994)
  - Black Winter Day (1994)
- Elegy (1996)
  - My Kantele (1997)
- Tuonela (1999)
  - Divinity / Northern Lights (1999)
- Story – 10th Anniversary (2000)
- Chapters (2003)
- Relapse Singles Series Vol. 4 (2004)
- His Story – Best Of (2016)
- Queen of Time (2018)
- Halo (2022)

=== Barren Earth ===
- Curse of the Red River (2010)
- The Devil's Resolve (2012)
- On Lonely Towers (2015)
- A Complex Of Cages (2018)

=== Octoploid ===
- Beyond the Aeons (2024)
