= Magic & Mayhem – Tales from the Early Years =

Compilation album by Amorphis
- Released: 15 September 2010
- Genre: Death/doom; melodic death metal; progressive metal; folk metal
- Length: 60:34
- Label: Nuclear Blast

Amorphis chronology
Skyforger (2009)	Magic & Mayhem – Tales from the Early Years (2010)	The Beginning of Times (2011)

Magic & Mayhem – Tales from the Early Years is the third compilation album by Finnish progressive metal band Amorphis, released on 15 September 2010, in Finland. It's a collection of re-recorded and partially re-arranged songs from their first three studio albums. In addition, the limited edition includes a cover of The Doors song "Light My Fire" as a bonus.

The majority of the vocals are performed by Tomi Joutsen. Vocal performances by Tomi Koivusaari also appear for the first time since 1997.

== Track listing ==
No.	Title	Lyrics	Music	Original album	Length
1.	"Magic and Mayhem"	Traditional	Esa Holopainen	Tales from the Thousand Lakes	5:24
2.	"Vulgar Necrolatry"	Jussi Ahlroth	Tomi Koivusaari	The Karelian Isthmus	4:44
3.	"Into Hiding"	Traditional	Holopainen, Olli-Pekka Laine	Tales from the Thousand Lakes	3:53
4.	"Black Winter Day"	Traditional	Kasper Mårtenson	Tales from the Thousand Lakes	3:55
5.	"On Rich and Poor"	Traditional	Holopainen, Kim Rantala	Elegy	5:24
6.	"Exile of the Sons of Uisliu"	Holopainen	Holopainen	The Karelian Isthmus	3:56
7.	"The Castaway"	Traditional	Koivusaari, Holopainen, Laine, Mårtenson	Tales from the Thousand Lakes	5:56
8.	"Song of the Troubled One"	Traditional	Holopainen, Laine	Elegy	4:14
9.	"Sign from the North Side"	Holopainen	Holopainen, Koivusaari, Laine	The Karelian Isthmus	5:04
10.	"Drowned Maid"	Traditional	Koivusaari, Holopainen, Laine	Tales from the Thousand Lakes	4:11
11.	"Against Widows"	Traditional	Laine	Elegy	4:19
12.	"My Kantele"	Traditional	Holopainen	Elegy	6:49
13.	"Light My Fire" (Bonus track, The Doors cover)	The Doors	The Doors	Tales from the Thousand Lakes	2:45
Total length:					60:34

== Personnel ==
=== Amorphis ===
- Tomi Joutsen – lead vocals
- Esa Holopainen – lead guitar
- Tomi Koivusaari – rhythm guitar, backing vocals
- Niclas Etelävuori – bass guitar
- Santeri Kallio – keyboards
- Jan Rechberger – drums

== Charts ==
Chart (2010)	Peak position
Finnish Albums Chart	8
Hungarian Albums Chart	6
