= Skyforger (album) =

Studio album by Amorphis
- Released: 27 May 2009
- Recorded: November 2008 – January 2009
- Genre: Melodic death metal, power metal, heavy metal
- Length: 47:42
- Label: Nuclear Blast
- Producer: Mikko Karmila, Marko Hietala, Amorphis

Amorphis chronology
Silent Waters (2007)	Skyforger (2009)	Magic & Mayhem – Tales from the Early Years (2010)

Singles from Skyforger
- 1. "Silver Bride" Released: 22 April 2009; 2. "From the Heaven of My Heart" Released: 30 October 2009

Professional ratings
Review scores
Source	Rating
About.com	4.5/5 stars
AllMusic	4/5 stars
Revolver	4/5 stars

Skyforger is the ninth studio album by Finnish progressive metal band Amorphis. Like the previous album, the lyrics to Skyforger are English translations of Finnish poems based on the Kalevala and written by Pekka Kainulainen. Unlike the two previous albums, it is based on different parts of several episodes, but all told from a single character's point of view. In this sense it is a return to Tales from the Thousand Lakes which told stories from different parts of the Kalevala. The last two albums focused on Kullervo and Lemminkäinen, respectively, and this one focuses on Ilmarinen.

Like Amorphis's previous two albums, Eclipse and Silent Waters, Skyforger is a concept album and was recorded at Sonic Pump Studios in Helsinki.

In addition to a regular edition, the album was also released in a limited digipak edition which included the bonus track "Godlike Machine". Initially, this digipak edition caused controversy because of sound level fluctuations during the tracks "My Sun" and "Skyforger", but Nuclear Blast has since remedied the problem by promising replacement CDs.

On 22 April 2009, "Silver Bride" was released as a Finland-only single, peaking at number 1. The music video for the single premiered on 11 May 2009.

The album's sound has been described as melodic death metal with influences from progressive metal, power metal and folk metal. The album was honored with a 2009 Metal Storm Award for Best Heavy Metal Album.

== Track listing ==
All lyrics by Pekka Kainulainen. All music as noted.

No.	Title	Music	Length
1.	"Sampo"	Kallio	6:08
2.	"Silver Bride"	Holopainen	4:13
3.	"From the Heaven of My Heart"	Kallio	5:20
4.	"Sky Is Mine"	Kallio	4:20
5.	"Majestic Beast"	Holopainen	4:19
6.	"My Sun"	Koivusaari	4:04
7.	"Highest Star"	Holopainen	4:44
8.	"Skyforger"	Holopainen	5:15
9.	"Course of Fate"	Kallio	4:15
10.	"From Earth I Rose"	Joutsen	5:04
Total length:			47:42

Bonus tracks
No.	Title	Music	Length
11.	"Godlike Machine"	Koivusaari	5:18
12.	"Separated"	Koivusaari	4:17
Total length:			57:17

== Chart positions ==
Chart (2009)	Peak position
Austrian Albums Chart	48
Finnish Albums Chart	1
Swiss Albums Chart	74
Top Heatseekers	33

== Personnel ==
=== Amorphis ===
- Amorphis – arrangements
  - Tomi Joutsen – vocals
  - Esa Holopainen – lead guitar
  - Tomi Koivusaari – rhythm guitar
  - Niclas Etelävuori – bass guitar
  - Santeri Kallio – keyboards, synthesizers, piano, organ
  - Jan Rechberger – drums

=== Other personnel ===
- Iikka Kahri – flute & saxophone
- Marko Hietala – backing vocals, vocal production
- Jouni Markkanen – backing vocals
- Peter James Goodman – backing vocals
- Tommi Salmela – backing vocals
- Sami Koivisto – engineering
- Mika Jussila – mastering
- Mikko Karmila – mixing
- 伊藤政則 (Itoh Masanori (Masa Itoh)) – Japanese liner notes

=== Lyrics ===
- Pekka Kainulainen – lyrics
- Erkki Virta – lyrics translation
- 国田ジンジャ一 (Ginger Kunita) – Japanese lyric translation

=== Photography ===
- Travis Smith - cover art
- Denis Goria – band photography
