= Silent Waters =

Silent Waters may refer to:

- Khamosh Pani (English: Silent Waters), a 2003 film by Sabiha Sumar, starring Kirron Kher
- Silent Waters (Leprous EP), 2004
- Silent Waters (Amorphis album), 2007
