= Circle (Amorphis album) =

Studio album by Amorphis
- Released: 17 April 2013 (JP); 19 April 2013 (EU); 22 April 2013 (UK); 30 April 2013 (US)
- Recorded: 10 September 2012 – 7 March 2013
- Studios: Petrax Studio, Hollola, Finland; 5K Studios, Helsinki, Finland
- Genres: Progressive metal, folk metal, melodic death metal
- Length: 46:22
- Label: Nuclear Blast
- Producer: Peter Tägtgren

Amorphis chronology
The Beginning of Times (2011)	Circle (2013)	Under the Red Cloud (2015)

Singles from Circle
- 1. "Hopeless Days" Released: 1 March 2013; 2. "The Wanderer" Released: 12 April 2013

Professional ratings
Review scores
Source	Rating
Decibel Magazine	8/10 stars
Outburn	(9/10)

Circle is the eleventh studio album by Finnish progressive metal band Amorphis, released on 17 April 2013 through Victor Entertainment and on 19 April 2013 through Nuclear Blast. Recorded at Petrax Studio in Hollola and at 5K Studios in Helsinki, it is the first Amorphis album since Far from the Sun (2003) not to be produced by Marko Hietala, or to be based on the Finnish national epic Kalevala. Instead, Circle was produced by Peter Tägtgren and focuses on an original story penned by lyricist Pekka Kainulainen.

== Writing and recording ==
In August 2012, Amorphis announced that they were going to start recording a new album the following month. Circle was recorded at Petrax Studio in Hollola and at 5K Studios in Helsinki. Peter Tägtgren, who had previously worked with Children of Bodom, Celtic Frost and Dimmu Borgir, among others, produced and mixed the album. As Tomi Koivusaari observed, the band was initially surprised by the up-front position that Tägtgren gave to the guitars relative to the keyboards. Bassist Niclas Etelävuori used a five-string bass on Circle, which was tuned a whole step down. Regarding the writing and recording process, guitarist Esa Holopainen stated:

While promoting The Beginning of Times, we started to feel that we were giving the same explanations over and over again when people asked about the studio process and how the songs came about. Even though the music was very strong, the making process didn't offer any surprises and appeared to be quite secured. Now the addition of a new dimension to the developing process has inspired us to focus on our material even more. The songs are extremely strong, bombastic and skull-pummelling.

Koivusaari further explained that the band needed to make a change to the recording process to maintain its inspiration. The band chose a "peaceful place" in the countryside to record, which, Koivusaari felt, led to the distinctive atmosphere.

=== Lyrical concept ===
Lyrics were once again written by Pekka Kainulainen, who has worked with Amorphis since 2007's Silent Waters. Up to this point all of Kainulainen's lyrics had been based on the Finnish national epic Kalevala, but on Circle they focus on an original concept. Kainulainen later gave a short summary of the album's concept:

The protagonist has been dealt a bad hand at birth. He's always felt himself an outsider with strong potential to become marginalized. Through an accident, after a crisis, he finds a connection with his inner powers. A guide is sent to him, from some other time and place. He gets a chance to take hold of his own life and change his destiny. From the past of Carelian Finland he finds his own spiritual tribe and the power to turn the course of his doomed life. This is a story of survival.

== Release and promotion ==
When Amorphis announced that they would begin recording their eleventh studio album in September 2012, they also announced that it would be released in spring the following year. On 10 September the band released a studio update via YouTube. The second and third studio updates were released on 17 and 25 September respectively. The fourth and final studio update was released on 7 March 2013. During a Finnish tour in late 2012, Amorphis performed the song "Shades of Gray", which was tentatively titled "Mehtä".

On 16 January 2013, Amorphis revealed the second release date of the album to be 19 April 2013. On 24 January 2013, the band revealed the track listing and cover art for Circle. Besides being available on CD, the album will also be released as a CD/DVD digibook (which includes a "Making of Circle" documentary and a music video for "Nightbird's Song"), a gatefold LP, and as a limited edition box set, containing three bonus track and a wristband. On 14 February, Amorphis announced that they would be performing Circle in its entirety at a special record-release show, on 25 April at the Circus in Helsinki. On 1 March, Amorphis released the first single from Circle, entitled "Hopeless Days". The lyric video for the song was released the same day. The tracks "Shades of Gray" and "Enchanted by the Moon" were released online on 29 March and 5 April respectively. On 12 April, "The Wanderer" was released as the second single from the album. On 19 April 2013, Amorphis released the official music video for "Hopeless Days". Circle was released in Europe on 19 April 2013 and reached number one in Finland.

== Track listing ==
All lyrics are written by Pekka Kainulainen

No.	Title	Music	Length
1.	"Shades of Gray"	Esa Holopainen	5:27
2.	"Mission"	Esa Holopainen	4:33
3.	"The Wanderer"	Santeri Kallio	4:43
4.	"Narrow Path"	Santeri Kallio	4:23
5.	"Hopeless Days"	Esa Holopainen	5:08
6.	"Nightbird's Song"	Tomi Koivusaari	5:00
7.	"Into the Abyss"	Santeri Kallio	5:36
8.	"Enchanted by the Moon"	Esa Holopainen	5:32
9.	"A New Day"	Esa Holopainen	6:00
Total length:			46:22

Bonus tracks
No.	Title	Music	Length
10.	"Dead Man's Dream"	Santeri Kallio	4:03
11.	"My Future"	Santeri Kallio	7:11
12.	"Illusion"	Santeri Kallio	4:18
13.	"New Song"	Esa Holopainen	4:54
14.	"His Story"	Esa Holopainen	4:34
Total length:			71:22

=== Limited edition bonus DVD ===
- "The Making of 'Circle'" – 1:00:31
- "Nightbird's Song" (video) – 5:10
- "Photo Gallery" – 2:42

== Personnel ==
=== Amorphis ===
- Tomi Joutsen – vocals
- Esa Holopainen – lead guitar
- Tomi Koivusaari – rhythm guitar
- Niclas Etelävuori – bass
- Santeri Kallio – keyboards
- Jan Rechberger – drums

=== Other personnel ===
- Peter Tägtgren – production, mixing
- Tom Bates – cover art
- Sakari Kukko – woodwinds
- Mari M – female vocals
- Tuukka Helminen – cello
- Jonas Kjellgren – mastering

== Charts ==
Chart (2013)	Peak position
Finnish Albums Chart	1
Hungarian Albums Chart	13
