= Black Winter Day =

EP by Amorphis
- Released: 31 January 1995
- Recorded: September 1993 (1); September 1994 (2–5)
- Studio: Sunlight Studios
- Genre: Melodic death metal; doom metal
- Length: 13:59
- Label: Relapse
- Producer: Amorphis; Tomas Skogsberg

Amorphis chronology
Tales from the Thousand Lakes (1994)	Black Winter Day (1995)	Elegy (1996)

Professional ratings
Review scores
Source	Rating
AllMusic	3/5 stars

Black Winter Day is a split EP by Finnish progressive metal band Amorphis with Dutch death metal band Gorefest, released in 1995. The track "Black Winter Day" is one of the band's best-known songs and continues to be a crowd favourite in live performances to this very day.

The song is covered by Children of Bodom on their album I Worship Chaos.

The song is also covered by Dol Ammad and the track appears on their album Winds of the Sun.

This is the last Amorphis release with Kasper Mårtenson and to have the band's original logo.

== Track listing ==
No.	Title	Lyrics	Music	Length
1.	"Black Winter Day"	traditional	Kasper Mårtenson	3:48
2.	"Folk of the North"	(instrumental)	Tomi Koivusaari	1:17
3.	"Moon and Sun"	traditional	Koivusaari	3:36
4.	"Moon and Sun Part II: North's Son"	traditional	Koivusaari	5:10

Bonus track
No.	Title	Lyrics	Music	Length
5.	"Light My Fire" (The Doors cover)	The Doors	The Doors	2:52
Total length:				16:44

Fear – Gorefest, split
No.	Title	Note	Length
5.	"Fear"		4:31
6.	"Raven"		3:07
7.	"Horrors in a Retarded Mind '94"		3:54
8.	"Fear"	Live	5:10
Total length:			29:52

== Personnel ==
=== Amorphis ===
- Amorphis – arrangements, recording and engineering
  - Tomi Koivusaari – vocals and rhythm guitar
  - Esa Holopainen – lead guitar
  - Olli-Pekka Laine – bass guitar
  - Kasper Martenson – keyboards
  - Jan Rechberger – drums

=== Additional personnel ===
- Ville Tuomi – speech/spoken word
- Tomas Skogsberg – recording & engineering

=== Gorefest ===
- Jan-Chris de Koeijer – vocals and bass
- Boudewijn Bonebakker – guitars
- Frank Harthoorn – guitars
- Ed Warby – drums
