= Am Universum =

Studio album by Amorphis
- Released: 23 February 2001 (Finland) 3 April 2001 (rest of the world)
- Recorded: October−December 2000
- Studio: Finnvox Studios, Helsinki, Finland
- Genre: Progressive metal, hard rock
- Length: 49:43 (original version)
- Label: Relapse
- Producer: Simon Efemey

Amorphis chronology
| Story – 10th Anniversary (2000) | Am Universum (2001) | Far from the Sun (2003) |

Singles from Am Universum
- 1. "Alone" Released: 1 February 2001

Professional ratings
Review scores
| Source | Rating |
|---|---|
| AllMusic | 2.5/5 stars |

Am Universum is the fifth studio album by Finnish progressive metal band Amorphis. This album was a departure from the doom/stoner metal influence on their previous album, Tuonela, featuring more of a vocal-driven hard rock sound. This is the first album to feature Niklas Etelävuori on bass who would remain in the band until 2017 and the last album with drummer Pekka Kasari who left in 2002.

The song "Alone" is also on the live DVD, Forging the Land of Thousand Lakes. The edited version of the song is on the single itself, and is also on Amorphis' greatest hits compilation album, Chapters. The DVD and the compilation both have the music video for the song. Other songs that are also on the compilation are "Too Much to See", which is also on the "Alone" single and "Drifting Memories".

== Track listing ==
All lyrics are written by Pasi Koskinen; all music is composed by Amorphis.

| No. | Title | Length |
|---|---|---|
| 1. | "Alone" | 6:18 |
| 2. | "Goddess (Of the Sad Man)" | 4:00 |
| 3. | "The Night Is Over" | 4:04 |
| 4. | "Shatters Within" | 5:22 |
| 5. | "Crimson Wave" | 4:45 |
| 6. | "Drifting Memories" | 4:24 |
| 7. | "Forever More" | 4:30 |
| 8. | "Veil of Sin" | 5:10 |
| 9. | "Captured State" | 4:28 |
| 10. | "Grieve Stricken Heart" | 6:42 |
| Total length: | | 49:43 |

== Personnel ==
=== Amorphis ===
- Pasi Koskinen – vocals
- Esa Holopainen – lead guitar
- Tomi Koivusaari – rhythm guitar
- Niclas Etelävuori – bass
- Santeri Kallio − keyboards, synthesizer
- Pekka Kasari − drums

=== Session musicians ===
- Sakari Kukko − saxophone on tracks 1, 5, 6, 8, 10
- Antti Halonen − saw on track 10
