= Under the Red Cloud =

Studio album by Amorphis
- Released: 4 September 2015
- Studio: Fascination Street Studios
- Genre: Progressive metal; melodic death metal
- Length: 49:56
- Label: Nuclear Blast
- Producer: Jens Bogren

Amorphis chronology
Circle (2013)	Under the Red Cloud (2015)	Queen of Time (2018)

Under the Red Cloud is the twelfth studio album by Finnish progressive metal band Amorphis, released worldwide on 4 September 2015 through Nuclear Blast. The album was produced by Jens Bogren, who was described as "just the right person" by keyboardist Santeri Kallio. This would be the band's last album with longtime bassist Niklas Etelävuori who left in 2017.

== Track listing ==
No.	Title	Lyrics	Music	Length
1.	"Under the Red Cloud"	Pekka Kainulainen	Santeri Kallio	5:33
2.	"The Four Wise Ones"	Kainulainen	Esa Holopainen	4:40
3.	"Bad Blood"	Kainulainen	Kallio	5:23
4.	"The Skull"	Kainulainen	Tomi Koivusaari	5:04
5.	"Death of a King"	Kainulainen	Kallio	5:14
6.	"Sacrifice"	Kainulainen	Holopainen	3:56
7.	"Dark Path"	Kainulainen	Holopainen	5:08
8.	"Enemy at the Gates"	Kainulainen	Holopainen	5:07
9.	"Tree of Ages"	Kainulainen	Kallio	4:36
10.	"White Night"	Kainulainen	Holopainen	5:15
Total length:				49:56

Deluxe Edition Bonus Tracks
No.	Title	Lyrics	Music	Length
11.	"Come the Spring"	Kainulainen	Koivusaari	3:27
12.	"The Wind"	Kainulainen	Kallio	5:48

Digipak Bonus Tracks
No.	Title	Lyrics	Music	Length
11.	"Come the Spring"	Kainulainen	Koivusaari	3:27
12.	"Winter's Sleep"	Kainulainen	Kallio	6:37

"Live at Loud Park 13", Bonus CD
No.	Title	Lyrics	Music	Length
1.	"Shades of Gray"	Kainulainen	Holopainen	7:28
2.	"Narrow Path"	Kainulainen	Kallio	4:46
3.	"Sky Is Mine"	Kainulainen	Kallio	4:22
4.	"Silver Bride"	Kainulainen	Holopainen	4:18
5.	"Into Hiding"	traditional	Holopainen, Olli-Pekka Laine	4:09
6.	"My Kantele"	traditional	Holopainen	6:39
7.	"Nightbird's Song"	Kainulainen	Koivusaari	5:09
8.	"Hopeless Days"	Kainulainen	Holopainen	5:24
9.	"House of Sleep"	Paavo Haavikko	Holopainen	5:29

CD2: Live-CD: "An Evening with Friends at Huvila" Bonus CD
No.	Title	Lyrics	Music	Length
1.	"Enigma"	Kainulainen	Holopainen	5:33
2.	"Far from the Sun"	Pasi Koskinen	Amorphis	5:00
3.	"Silent Waters"	Kainulainen	Kallio	5:53
4.	"My Kantele"	traditional	Holopainen	5:09
5.	"Silver Bride"	Kainulainen	Holopainen	4:56
6.	"Sampo"	Kainulainen	Kallio	6:54
7.	"Alone"	Koskinen	Amorphis	6:57
8.	"The Wanderer"	Kainulainen	Kallio	4:54
9.	"Her Alone"	Kainulainen	Holopainen	7:46

== Reception ==
Professional ratings
Review scores
Source	Rating
Blabbermouth.net	8/10 stars
Angry Metal Guy	4/5 stars
PopMatters	mixed
Cryptic Rock	5/5 stars

Upon release, the album received critical acclaim. Cryptic Rock reviewed the album, finding that it had more of a focus on melody than the previous album, and it had a wider variety of instruments, which was more in line with the band's pre-2012 work. "The Four Wise Ones" was described as an "instant classic" song, "pure melodic death metal at its finest." Cryptic Rock also saw songs that were heavy metal, folk metal and rock ballads.

Under the Red Cloud debuted at No. 144 on the Billboard 200 charts, selling 1,600 units in the US in its first week.

=== Charts ===
Chart (2015)	Peak position
Austrian Albums (Ö3 Austria)	20
Belgian Albums (Ultratop Flanders)	53
Belgian Albums (Ultratop Wallonia)	40
Dutch Albums (Album Top 100)	50
Finnish Albums (Suomen virallinen lista)	2
French Albums (SNEP)	85
Hungarian Albums (MAHASZ)	25
German Albums (Offizielle Top 100)	10
Swiss Albums (Schweizer Hitparade)	11
UK Independent Albums (OCC)	21
UK Progressive Albums (OCC)	10
UK Rock & Metal Albums (OCC)	16

== Personnel ==
=== Amorphis ===
- Tomi Joutsen – vocals
- Esa Holopainen – lead guitar; music (2, 6–8 & 10)
- Tomi Koivusaari – rhythm guitar; music (4 & 11)
- Niclas Etelävuori – bass
- Santeri Kallio – keyboards; music (1, 3, 5, 9 & 12), engineering (church organ)
- Jan Rechberger – drums

=== Miscellaneous staff ===
- Chrigel Glanzmann – flute, tin whistle (2, 5, 9 & Winter's Sleep)
- Martin Lopez – percussion (5)
- André Alvinzi – additional keyboards (6)
- Linus Corneliusson – mixing assistance
- Pekka Kainulainen – lyrics
- Valnoir Mortasonge – artwork

=== Additional Vocalists ===
- Aleah Stanbridge – backing vocals (2, 6 & 10)
- Jens Bogren – backing vocals, mixing and mastering

=== Orchestra ===
- Jon Phipps – additional and strings arrangements
- Österäng Symphonic Orchestra

=== Engineers ===
- Lasse Väyrynen – Jan Rechberger's percussion
- David Castillo – Martin Lopez's percussion
- Jyri Riikonen – grand piano, Hammond and Rhodes
- Jonas Olsson
- Viktor Stenqvist
