= Disment of Soul =

Demo album by Amorphis
- Released: 4 January 1991
- Genre: Death-doom, death metal
- Length: 11:34
- Label: Independent
- Producer: Amorphis

Amorphis chronology
Disment of Soul (1991)	The Karelian Isthmus (1992)

Disment of Soul is the first demo by Finnish progressive metal band Amorphis. It was released as a cassette tape on 4 January 1991.

== Track listing ==
No.	Title	Lyrics	Music	Length
1.	"Disment of Soul"	Instrumental	T. Koivusaari, E. Holopainen	04:02
2.	"Excursing from Existence"	E. Holopainen	T. Koivusaari	03:27
3.	"Privilege of Evil"	E. Holopainen	E. Holopainen	04:05
Total length:				11:34

== Credits ==
=== Amorphis ===
- Tomi Koivusaari – vocals, rhythm guitar
- Esa Holopainen – lead guitar
- Olli-Pekka Laine – bass guitar
- Jan Rechberger – drums

=== Additional personnel ===
- Thorncross (Christophe Moyen) – artwork
- Timo Tolkki – recording
