= Xysma =

Finnish rock band

- Origin: Naantali, Finland
- Genres: Hard rock; garage rock; stoner rock; death 'n' roll; grindcore (early)
- Years active: 1988–1998; 2006; 2011–present
- Label: Spinefarm
- Members: Janitor Mustasch; Olivier Lawny; Dr. Heavenly; Marvellous Sidney Safe
- Past members: Vesa Iitti; Thee Stranius

Xysma is a Finnish rock, and formerly death metal, band that was founded in 1988 in Naantali, a small town near Turku. The band split up in 1998, but reunited in 2006 for a memorial gig, and reunited again in 2011. They have released six studio albums.

== History ==
=== Formation and early years ===
In the beginning, Xysma played grindcore and death metal. The band played at the Turku underground center Panimo, and created an intense yet short-lived scene. Soon after, the death metal/grindcore influence spread to the Helsinki area, with bands such as Abhorrence (which soon evolved into the melodic death metal band Amorphis).

Xysma's first demo, Swarming of the Maggots, was widely distributed via tape trading and became a cult classic (it was remastered and released in the 2004 Xysma compilation CD). The band's music was inspired by the early pioneers of the genre like Carcass and Napalm Death. With the following mini-albums, Above the Mind of Morbidity and Fata Morgana, the latter being released in the United States with the famous Seraphic Decay label, Xysma evolved towards less extreme metal.

=== Yeah and First & Magical ===
Since Xysma was a part of the rise of Scandinavian death metal, they had close bonds to the scene in Stockholm, occasionally travelling to and playing there and visiting their colleagues from Entombed and others. Xysma also recorded their first album, Yeah (1991), in Sweden, in the Sunlight Studios of producer Tomas Skogsberg.

Yeah mixed death metal and Black Sabbath structures in a complex fashion. Their second album, First & Magical (1992), revealed more changes and more musical evolution, featuring something akin to death 'n' roll.

=== Deluxe, Lotto and Girl on the Beach ===
Xysma's third album, Deluxe (1993), continued to evolve their death 'n' roll sound, with the instrumentals becoming more rock-like. The songs were hard-paced, in the vein of Helmet. This was the last album on which Janitor used growled vocals. The next album, Lotto (1996), was a full-blooded rock album with a very retro style; one of the tracks was featured later in Brian De Palma's movie Snake Eyes (1998). The band also released an EP called Singles, containing covers of classics sung in a schlager style.

Xysma's fifth album, Girl on the Beach, was more or less a pop rock album, and tension between the members grew. Eventually, the band decided to quit.

=== Reunions and No Place Like Alone ===
Guitarist Toni Stranius (1972–2006), member of both Xysma and Disgrace, died in 2006 after a heart attack in Ireland, where he lived. A memorial gig in his honour was held on 15 September 2006 in Bar Päiväkoti, Turku. All of Stranius' bands (including Disgrace, Xysma and Finnish rock band Kalsaripaita) played at the occasion, reuniting Xysma just for this special event.

Xysma has been playing live concerts again since 2011.

On 3 February 2023, the band released a new single "Sigh for Sore Mind". Their sixth album, No Place Like Alone, was released on 24 March. It is the band's first album in 25 years.

== Members ==
=== Current members ===
- Marvellous Sidney Safe – drums (1988–1998, 2006, 2011–present)
- Janitor Mustasch – vocals (1988–1998, 2006, 2011–present), guitar (1988–1989)
- Olivier Lawny – guitar (1989–1998, 2006, 2011–present)
- Dr. Heavenly – bass (1992–1998, 2006, 2011–present)
- Janne Lastumäki – keyboards (2019–present)

=== Former members ===
- Thee Stranius – guitar (1988–1998)
- Vesa Iitti – bass (1989–1992)

== Discography ==
=== Studio albums ===
- Yeah (1991)
- First & Magical (1992)
- Deluxe (1993)
- Lotto (1996)
- Girl on the Beach (1998)
- No Place Like Alone (2023)

=== EPs ===
- Above the Mind of Morbidity (1990)
- Fata Morgana (1990)
- Singles (1997)
