= Queen of Time =

Studio album by Amorphis
- Released: 18 May 2018
- Recorded: 2017–2018
- Studio: Fascination Street Studios
- Genres: Progressive metal; melodic death metal
- Length: 57:29
- Label: Nuclear Blast
- Producer: Jens Bogren

Amorphis chronology
Under the Red Cloud (2015)	Queen of Time (2018)	Halo (2022)

Professional ratings
Review scores
Source	Rating
Metal Injection	9/10 stars
Sputnikmusic	3/5 stars
Distorted Sound Magazine	8/10 stars
Blabbermouth	9/10 stars
Louder	8/10 stars

Queen of Time is the thirteenth studio album by Finnish progressive metal band Amorphis, released worldwide on 18 May 2018 through Nuclear Blast. This is the first album since 1999's Tuonela to feature original bassist Olli-Pekka Laine who rejoined the band in 2017, making this the first time since 1994's Tales from the Thousand Lakes that all four original band members played together on an album. The album was produced by Jens Bogren, who was described as "a true brother in spirit."

== Critical reception ==
Queen of Time received positive reviews upon release.

Blabbermouth praised the use of a variety of instruments such as flutes, saxophone, reeds, or xylophones, calling the compositions "long, layered and resonant".

Louder wrote: "Amorphis are incredible songwriters; everything from stirring opener The Bee through to lavish, dramatic closer Pyres On The Coast boasts at least one life-affirming hook, and vocalist Tomi Joutsen has never sounded more commanding."

== Track listing ==
All lyrics are written by Pekka Kainulainen.

No.	Title	Music	Length
1.	"The Bee"	Santeri Kallio	5:30
2.	"Message in the Amber"	Esa Holopainen	6:44
3.	"Daughter of Hate"	Holopainen	6:20
4.	"The Golden Elk"	Kallio	6:22
5.	"Wrong Direction"	Holopainen	5:09
6.	"Heart of the Giant"	Kallio	6:32
7.	"We Accursed"	Kallio	4:59
8.	"Grain of Sand"	Holopainen	4:44
9.	"Amongst Stars" (featuring Anneke van Giersbergen)	Kallio	4:50
10.	"Pyres on the Coast"	Holopainen	6:19
Total length:			57:29

Japanese edition bonus track
No.	Title	Music	Length
11.	"Honeyflow" (featuring Akira Takasaki)	Kallio	5:15
Total length:			62:44

Vinyl and Digipak editions bonus tracks
No.	Title	Music	Length
11.	"As Mountains Crumble"	Olli-Pekka Laine	6:17
12.	"Brother and Sister"	Kallio	6:03
Total length:			69:49

== Personnel ==
=== Amorphis ===
- Tomi Joutsen – vocals
- Esa Holopainen – lead guitar
- Tomi Koivusaari – rhythm guitar
- Olli-Pekka Laine – bass
- Santeri Kallio – keyboards, engineering (church organ)
- Jan Rechberger – drums

=== Miscellaneous staff ===
- Chrigel Glanzmann – tin whistle, low whistle
- Noa Gruman – arrangements (choirs), conductor
- Albert Kuvezin – laryngeal singing on "The Bee"
- Akira Takasaki – guitar solo on "Honeyflow" (bonus track)
- Jørgen Munkeby – saxophone on "Daughter of Hate"
- Linus Corneliusson – mixing assistance
- Valnoir Mortasonge – artwork

=== Additional vocalists ===
- Anneke van Giersbergen – female vocals on "Amongst Stars"
- Noa Gruman – female vocals (additional) (tracks 1, 2, 4)
- Hellscore Choir – choir vocals (tracks 2, 3, 5, 6, 8)

== Charts ==
Chart (2018)	Peak position
Austrian Albums (Ö3 Austria)	11
Belgian Albums (Ultratop Flanders)	60
Belgian Albums (Ultratop Wallonia)	66
Czech Albums (ČNS IFPI)	45
Finnish Albums (Suomen virallinen lista)	1
French Albums (SNEP)	84
German Albums (Offizielle Top 100)	4
Hungarian Albums (MAHASZ)	16
Scottish Albums (Official Charts)	46
Spanish Albums (PROMUSICAE)	98
Swedish Albums (Sverigetopplistan)	45
Swiss Albums (Schweizer Hitparade)	3
US Heatseekers Albums (Billboard)	3
