= Barren Earth =

Finnish progressive death metal band

- Origin: Helsinki, Finland
- Genres: Progressive death metal, melodic death metal, doom metal
- Years active: 2007–present
- Label: Peaceville Records
- Members: Sami Yli-Sirniö; Janne Perttilä; Olli-Pekka Laine; Marko Tarvonen; Jón Aldará; Antti Myllynen
- Past members: Kasper Mårtenson; Mikko Kotamäki
- Website: barrenearth.com

Barren Earth is a Finnish progressive death metal band from Helsinki, formed in 2007. Their music is said to be a combination of death metal, progressive rock, and folk music, pulling influence from the different groups each member is associated with. Since their formation, the band has released one EP and four full-length albums.

== History ==
=== Our Twilight and Curse of the Red River (2009 onwards) ===
In November 2009, the EP Our Twilight was issued, and included four songs. Shortly after the EP had been issued, Barren Earth performed its first gig, in the club Dante's Highlight in Helsinki. However, as the LP was set for release in March 2010, most of the festivals had already booked bands for the summer 2010. Barren Earth had a gig on Tuska Open Air Metal Festival, though.

In February 2011, the band played a five-week tour in North America under the name "Finnish Metal Tour 2011", alongside other Finnish bands including Finntroll, Ensiferum and Rotten Sound, gathering support for their album that would officially be released around two months later. On 31 March 2010, the band issued their debut album, Curse of the Red River. One of its nine songs was the title song of the previous EP, "Our Twilight". The album received very positive reviews. The band went on to receive the title of "Newcomer of the year" in 2011 at the Finnish Metal Awards, and "Best debut album" at the Metal Storm Awards 2010.

=== The Devil's Resolve (2012) ===
On various websites dedicated to metal bands, it was told that the band's second album, The Devil's Resolve, containing nine songs, was due to be released in November 2011, once again by Peaceville Records. The Devil's Resolve is said to contain even more 1970s progressive influences while keeping the brutality associated with the band. On their website, the band stated that, originally, twelve songs were written. However, on the band's Facebook page the band told that because of delays in the production process the second album would not take place until February/March 2012. On 29 February 2012, the band released the video "The Rains Begin" from their upcoming album.

=== On Lonely Towers (2015) ===
Barren Earth revealed on 28 January 2015 that their new album On Lonely Towers will be released on 24 March 2015 by Century Media Records. In 2014 the Faroese singer Jón Aldará joined the band as the new lead vocalist. He is also known from the Faroese metal band Hamferð and Iotunn.

=== A Complex of Cages (2018) ===
Barren Earth's fourth album A Complex of Cages was released just before the Easter 2018. The band and their audience celebrated the new album on Good Friday evening in a record releasing gig at Kuudes Linja club in Helsinki, supported by a local metal group Oceanhoarse. This album is the second with Jón Aldará as a frontman, but his first in which he contributes more than just vocals. Almost all the lyrics on the record are contributed by Jón Aldará ("Solitude Pith" being the exception with lyrics by Laine). The man is responsible mostly of the melodies, as well. According to Olli-Pekka Laine Aldará was given freedom to write the lyrics, and they will not be discussed at all amongst the bandmembers. "As long as our songs are not telling about slaughtering the whale, anything will be fine by me", Laine says. "Solitude Pith", written by Laine, was already done before Aldará begun his lyrical working. It seems that song gave him some ideas, and then that theme emerged into penetrating theme for the whole album. Aldará writes about people isolating, and suffering from different mental issues such as manic depression, psychopathy and agoraphobia.

A Complex of Cages is also the first Barren Earth record made with absence of keyboardist Kasper Mårtenson, who is occupied with Turisas as their live keyboardist. He was succeeded by Antti Myllynen. The line-up change of Mårtenson leaving impacted the band's compositions, since he had been writing about a half of the material whereas Olli-Pekka Laine has been the mastermind behind the other half. While Laine is still the man behind most of the composing, the other members Sami Yli-Sirniö, Janne Perttilä and Marko Tarvonen now also contribute.

The fourth record has gained positive accolade by the reviewers, hailing it the best Barren Earth album so far. Jón Aldará, now singing the lyrics mostly according to his own mind and will, switches between heavy growls and clear, even operatic vocals. The band itself thanks V. Santura (Triptykon) for his involvement on producing the record.

== Band members ==
=== Current members ===
- Sami Yli-Sirniö – lead guitar, backing vocals (2007–present)
- Janne Perttilä – rhythm guitar, backing vocals (2007–present)
- Olli-Pekka Laine – bass, backing vocals (2007–present)
- Marko Tarvonen – drums (2007–present)
- Jón Aldará – lead vocals (2014–present)
- Antti Myllynen – keyboards (2017–present)

=== Former members ===
- Kasper Mårtenson – keyboards, backing vocals (2007–2017)
- Mikko Kotamäki – lead vocals (2007–2013)

== Discography ==
=== Albums ===
- 2010 – Curse of the Red River
- 2012 – The Devil's Resolve
- 2015 – On Lonely Towers
- 2018 – A Complex of Cages

=== EPs ===
- 2009 – Our Twilight

== Videography ==
- 2010 – ”The Leer" (directed by Owe Lingvall)
- 2012 – ”The Rains Begin"
- 2015 – ”Set Alight" (directed by Owe Lingvall)
- 2018 – ”Withdrawal" (lyric video)
- 2018 – ”The Ruby" (directed by Vesa Ranta)

== See also ==
- List of doom-metal bands
- List of melodic death-metal bands
- List of progressive-metal bands
- Music of Finland
