= The Beginning of Times =

Studio album by Amorphis
- Released: 25 May 2011
- Recorded: January 2011
- Studio: Sonic Pump Studios, Helsinki, Marco's CockPit, Kuopio
- Genre: Progressive metal, melodic death metal, gothic metal, hard rock
- Length: 54:42
- Label: Nuclear Blast
- Producer: Marko Hietala (vocals), Amorphis

Amorphis chronology
Magic & Mayhem – Tales from the Early Years (2010)	The Beginning of Times (2011)	Circle (2013)

Singles from The Beginning of Times
- 1. "You I Need" Released: 20 April 2011

The Beginning of Times is the tenth studio album by Finnish progressive metal band Amorphis, released on 25 May 2011 in Finland, 27 May in Europe and 7 June in the United States. Like previous Amorphis albums, The Beginning of Times, is a concept album. The central character of the songs is Väinämöinen, described by the band as "the iconic hero of Finnish mythology".

== Release ==
=== Singles ===
On 11 April 2011, Amorphis premiered the first single "You I Need" on their Facebook page. It was released digitally in Finland on 20 April 2011, and in other countries on 22 April 2011. Early the next month, the band released another new song, "My Enemy", again on Facebook.

=== Reception ===
Professional ratings
Review scores
Source	Rating
Allmusic	3.5/5 stars
Jukebox:Metal	5/5 stars
PopMatters	7/10 stars
Metal-Temple.com	8/10 stars
Rockfreaks.net	7.5/10 stars
MetalUnderground.com	4/5 stars
Sea of Tranquility	4.5/5 stars

The Beginning of Times had a strong sales debut week, charting at No. 1 on the Finnish Albums Chart and No. 16 on the German Media Control Charts.

In a professional review for PopMatters, Adrien Begrand praised the album, going so far as to say that Amorphis have never sounded better with their current line-up and describes the album as "a slick, classy blend of death metal and melodic hard rock". Amateur reviews have also been positive, with Craig Hartranft of DangerDog proclaiming "The Beginning of Times finds Amorphis in grand form, doing what they do best".

== Track listing ==
All lyrics are written by Pekka Kainulainen

No.	Title	Music	Length
1.	"Battle for Light"	Santeri Kallio	5:35
2.	"Mermaid"	Kallio	4:24
3.	"My Enemy"	Tomi Koivusaari	3:25
4.	"You I Need"	Kallio	4:22
5.	"Song of the Sage"	Kallio	5:27
6.	"Three Words"	Esa Holopainen	3:55
7.	"Reformation"	Holopainen	4:33
8.	"Soothsayer"	Koivusaari	4:09
9.	"On a Stranded Shore"	Kallio	4:13
10.	"Escape"	Kallio	3:52
11.	"Crack in a Stone"	Holopainen	4:56
12.	"Beginning of Time"	Holopainen	5:51
Total length:			54:42

Bonus track
No.	Title	Music	Length
13.	"Heart's Song"	Holopainen	4:07
Total length:			58:49

== Personnel ==
=== Amorphis ===
- Tomi Joutsen – vocals
- Esa Holopainen – lead guitar
- Tomi Koivusaari – rhythm guitar
- Niclas Etelävuori – bass guitar
- Santeri Kallio – keyboards; synthesizers; piano; organ
- Jan Rechberger – drums

=== Additional personnel ===
- Savotta Choir – additional male vocals
- Netta Dahlberg – additional female vocals
- Iikka Kahri – flute, clarinet & saxophone
- Marko Hietala - vocals production
- Mikko Karmila - mixing
- Travis Smith - cover art
- Pekka Kainulainen - lyrics

=== Additional personnel 2 ===
- Erkki Virta - lyric translation
- Sami Koivisto - engineering
- Thomas Ewerhard - layout
- Svante Forsbäck - mastering
- Stefan de Batselier - photography

== Charts ==
Chart (2011)	Peak position
Finnish Albums Chart	1
