= Halo (Amorphis album) =

Studio album by Amorphis
- Released: 11 February 2022
- Recorded: January–August 2021
- Studio: Fascination Street Studios, Isolla Music and Sonic Pump Studios
- Genre: Progressive metal; melodic death metal; folk metal
- Length: 55:46
- Label: Atomic Fire
- Producer: Jens Bogren

Amorphis chronology
Queen of Time (2018)	Halo (2022)	Borderland (2025)

Singles from Halo
- 1. "On the Dark Waters" Released: 28 January 2022

Halo is the fourteenth studio album by Finnish progressive metal band Amorphis, released worldwide on 11 February 2022 through Atomic Fire Records.

Professional ratings
Review scores
Source	Rating
AngryMetalGuy	4/5 stars
Blabbermouth.net	9/10
Bravewords	6.5/10
Distorted Sound	10/10
Louder	4/5 stars
Metal Injection	8.5/10
Metal Rules	5/5 stars
Metal Storm	8.3/10
Sonic Perspectives	8.9/10

== Track listing ==
All lyrics are written by Pekka Kainulainen.

No.	Title	Music	Length
1.	"Northwards"	Esa Holopainen	5:30
2.	"On the Dark Waters"	Holopainen	4:47
3.	"The Moon"	Santeri Kallio	5:57
4.	"Windmane"	Holopainen	4:49
5.	"A New Land"	Holopainen	4:36
6.	"When the Gods Came"	Kallio	4:56
7.	"Seven Roads Come Together"	Kallio	5:38
8.	"War"	Holopainen	5:24
9.	"Halo"	Kallio	4:40
10.	"The Wolf"	Holopainen	4:46
11.	"My Name Is Night"	Tomi Koivusaari	4:43
Total length:			55:46

Japanese edition bonus track
No.	Title	Music	Length
12.	"The River Song"	Olli-Pekka Laine	4:29
Total length:			60:11

Japanese limited edition bonus Live CD (Disc 2)
No.	Title	Music	Length
1.	"Death of a King" (2019.1.16 Rockefeller Music Hall, Oslo, Norway)	Kallio	6:42
2.	"Sacrifice" (2018.8.3 Wacken Open Air 2018, Wacken, Germany)	Holopainen	4:07
3.	"Amongst Stars" (2019.6.27 Provinssi 2019, Seinäjoki, Finland)	Kallio	4:59
4.	"Sky Is Mine" (2019.2.10 Le Transbordeur, Villeurbanne, France)	Kallio	4:37
5.	"Message in the Amber" (Barba Negra Music Club, Budapest, Hungary)	Holopainen	6:48
6.	"Her Alone" (2019.6.28 Tuska 2019, Helsinki, Finland)	Holopainen	6:54
7.	"The Castaway" (2018.8.10 Alcatraz Metal Festival 2018, Kortrijk, Belgium)	Holopainen; T. Koivusaari; Laine; K. Mårtenson	5:57
8.	"Grain of Sand" (2019.6.27 Provinssi 2019, Seinäjoki, Finland)	Holopainen	4:59
9.	"Hopeless Days" (2019.1.22 Arenele Romane, Bucharest, Romania)	Holopainen	5:40
10.	"We Accursed" (2019.6.28 Tuska 2019, Helsinki, Finland)	Kallio	5:10
Total length:			56:03

== Personnel ==
=== Amorphis ===
- Tomi Joutsen – lead vocals
- Esa Holopainen – lead guitar
- Tomi Koivusaari – rhythm guitar, backing vocals
- Olli-Pekka Laine – bass
- Santeri Kallio – keyboards
- Jan Rechberger – drums, keyboards

=== Miscellaneous staff ===
- Francesco Ferrini – orchestrations, keyboards
- Noa Gruman – female vocals
- Jesse Bartholomew Zuretti – orchestrations, keyboards
- Erik Mjörnell – guitars (track 11)
- Oskari Auramo – percussion
- Jan Rechberger – percussion
- Petronella Nettermalm – female vocals (track 11)

=== Production and art ===
- Jens Bogren – producer
- Pekka Kainulainen – lyrics
- Sam Jamsen – photography
- Metastazis – artwork, design
- Tony Lindgren – mastering
- Linus Corneliusson – mixing, editing
- Ricardo Borges – mixing, editing
- Ikevil – lyrics translation

== Charts ==
Chart (2022)	Peak position
Austrian Albums (Ö3 Austria)	7
Finnish Albums (Suomen virallinen lista)	1
German Albums (Offizielle Top 100)	3
Swedish Albums (Sverigetopplistan)	42
