= Eclipse (Amorphis album) =

Studio album by Amorphis
- Released: 15 February 2006
- Recorded: 1 July – August 2005
- Studio: Sonic Pump Studios (Helsinki, Finland)
- Genre: Folk metal, hard rock, heavy metal, gothic metal
- Length: 41:47
- Label: Nuclear Blast
- Producer: Amorphis

Amorphis chronology
Chapters (2003)	Eclipse (2006)	Silent Waters (2007)

Singles from Eclipse
- 1. "House of Sleep" Released: 4 January 2006; 2. "The Smoke" Released: 7 June 2006

Professional ratings
Review scores
Source	Rating
About.com	4.5/5 stars
AllMusic	3.5/5 stars
Blabbermouth.net	8.5/10 stars

Eclipse is the seventh studio album by Finnish progressive metal band Amorphis. The lyrics are from a play based on the Kullervo legend (told in the Kalevala), written by Finnish poet and playwright Paavo Haavikko in 1982.

Eclipse is also notable for being current vocalist Tomi Joutsen's debut with Amorphis following the departure of longtime singer Pasi Koskinen in 2005. It also marked the reintroduction of death growls into their music, albeit in limited quantity compared to subsequent albums. Music videos were made for the tracks "House of Sleep" and "The Smoke".

In February 2008, the record was certified gold in Finland, having sold over 15,000 units.

== Release ==
Eclipse was released in Europe on 15 February 2006, with staggered dates across the region, including releases on 17 February in most European territories and 24 February in Germany, Austria, and Switzerland. The album was released in the United States on 21 March 2006.

== Track listing ==
No.	Title	Lyrics	Music	Length
1.	"Two Moons"	P. Haavikko	E. Holopainen, S. Kallio	3:24
2.	"House of Sleep"	P. Haavikko	E. Holopainen	4:15
3.	"Leaves Scar"	P. Haavikko	E. Holopainen	3:22
4.	"Born from Fire"	P. Haavikko	S. Kallio	4:07
5.	"Under a Soil and Black Stone"	T. Koivusaari	S. Kallio	4:12
6.	"Perkele (The God of Fire)"	P. Haavikko	N. Etelävuori	3:27
7.	"The Smoke"	P. Haavikko	E. Holopainen	3:38
8.	"Same Flesh"	P. Haavikko	S. Kallio	4:37
9.	"Brother Moon"	E. Holopainen	E. Holopainen	5:10
10.	"Empty Opening"	P. Haavikko	E. Holopainen	5:37
Total length:				41:47

Bonus track from the digipak edition
No.	Title	Lyrics	Music	Length
11.	"Stone Woman"	P. Haavikko	T. Koivusaari	3:38
Total length:				45:24

== Credits ==
=== Amorphis ===
- Tomi Joutsen − vocals
- Esa Holopainen − lead guitar
- Tomi Koivusaari − rhythm guitar
- Niclas Etelävuori − bass
- Santeri Kallio − keyboards, piano, synthesizer and other samples
- Jan Rechberger − drums

=== Other personnel ===
- Marko Hietala − vocals producer, backing vocals
- Mikko Karmila – mixing
- Travis Smith – album artwork
