= Far from the Sun =

Studio album by Amorphis
- Released: 26 May 2003
- Recorded: November 2002–January 2003
- Studio: Finnvox Studios; Seawolf Studios; CCPC (Helsinki)
- Genre: Progressive rock; progressive metal; hard rock
- Length: 43:51
- Label: Virgin; EMI; Nuclear Blast
- Producer: Amorphis

Amorphis chronology
Am Universum (2001)	Far from the Sun (2003)	Chapters (2003)

Singles from Far from the Sun
- 1. "Day of Your Beliefs" Released: April 2003; 2. "Evil Inside" Released: 26 May 2003

Professional ratings
Review scores
Source	Rating
AllMusic	3/5 stars
Blabbermouth	5.5/10 stars

Far from the Sun is the sixth studio album by Finnish progressive metal band Amorphis.

It was the first album to feature drummer Jan Rechberger since 1994's Tales from the Thousand Lakes, replacing Pekka Kasari who had quit the band to spend more time with his family. It was their last album to feature Pasi Koskinen on vocals.

The American release is packaged in a slipcase and features five bonus tracks and a video for "Evil Inside". The song, "Darkrooms" is also a bonus track for the Japanese edition.

The album was re-released in Europe in 2008 by Nuclear Blast. This new version includes all the bonus tracks that were previously only available on the American version and also has new artwork.

== Track listing ==
All lyrics are written by Pasi Koskinen; all music is composed by Amorphis.

No.	Title	Length
1.	"Day of Your Beliefs"	5:04
2.	"Planetary Misfortune"	4:27
3.	"Evil Inside"	3:57
4.	"Mourning Soil"	3:47
5.	"Far from the Sun"	4:00
6.	"Ethereal Solitude"	4:30
7.	"Killing Goodness"	3:55
8.	"God of Deception"	3:38
9.	"Higher Ground"	5:39
10.	"Smithereens"	4:51
Total length:		43:51

Japanese release bonus track
No.	Title	Length
11.	"Darkrooms"	3:23

German release bonus tracks
No.	Title	Length
11.	"Shining Turns to Grey"	2:58
12.	"Follow Me into the Fire"	5:26
13.	"Darkrooms"	3:23
14.	"Dreams of the Damned"	4:49
15.	"Far from the Sun" (^{Note 1})	4:20

German & American release bonus tracks
No.	Title	Length
16.	"Evil Inside" (^{Note 2})	3:24

=== Notes ===
1. ^Note 1 Acoustic
2. ^Note 2 Music video

== Personnel ==
=== Amorphis ===
- Amorphis – all music
  - Pasi Koskinen − vocals, lyrics
  - Esa Holopainen − lead guitar
  - Tomi Koivusaari − rhythm guitar
  - Niclas Etelävuori − bass
  - Santeri Kallio − keyboards
  - Jan Rechberger − drums

=== Additional personnel ===
- Mixed by Hiili Hiilesmaa at Finnvox Studios – Helsinki, Finland, February 2003
- Mastered by Thomas Eberger at Cutting Room – Stockholm, Sweden, February 2003
- Album cover and art direction by David K
