= Privilege of Evil =

EP by Amorphis
- Released: 5 December 1993
- Recorded: May 1991
- Studios: TTT Studio, Helsinki
- Genre: Death metal
- Length: 23:10
- Label: Relapse
- Producer: Amorphis

Amorphis chronology
The Karelian Isthmus (1992)	Privilege of Evil (1993)	Tales from the Thousand Lakes (1994)

Professional ratings
Review scores
Source	Rating
AllMusic	4/5 stars
Satan Stole My Teddybear	(?)

Privilege of Evil is the first EP by Finnish progressive metal band Amorphis, released in 1993. It is a collection of demo material from Amorphis' early career recorded in Timo Tolkki's (Stratovarius) TTT Studio in 1991. At that time only two of these songs were picked for the band's first 7" single, but the full session was released two years later on this EP. On the EP's reissue by Relapse Records, the band became upset to hear that their early material was released. The material on this EP was originally meant to be for a split album with Incantation, which never materialized. Incantation's half of the split would only be released individually sixteen years later as the Blasphemous Cremation EP.

== Track listing ==
No.	Title	Writer(s)	Length
1.	"Pilgrimage from Darkness"	Amorphis	4:32
2.	"Black Embrace"	E. Holopainen, T. Koivusaari, J. Rechberger	3:25
3.	"Privilege of Evil"	Amorphis	3:50
4.	"Misery Path"	E. Holopainen, T. Koivusaari, J. Rechberger	4:17
5.	"Vulgar Necrolatry"	T. Koivusaari, Ahlroth	3:58
6.	"Excursing from Existence"	Amorphis	3:06
Total length:			23:10

The Karelian Isthmus / Privilege of Evil, EP
No.	Title	Writer(s)	Length
1.	"Karelia"		0:43
2.	"The Gathering"		4:12
3.	"Grail's Mysteries"		3:02
4.	"Warriors Trial"		5:04
5.	"Black Embrace"		3:38
6.	"Exile of the Sons of Uisliu"		3:43
7.	"The Lost Name of God"		5:32
8.	"The Pilgrimage"		4:39
9.	"Misery Path"		4:17
10.	"Sign from the North Side"		4:54
11.	"Pilgrimage from Darkness"	Amorphis	4:32
12.	"Privilege of Evil"	Amorphis	3:50
13.	"Misery Path"	E. Holopainen, T. Koivusaari, J. Rechberger	4:17
14.	"Vulgar Necrolatry"	T. Koivusaari, Ahlroth	3:58
15.	"Excursing from Existence"	Amorphis	3:06
Total length:			59:27

== Personnel ==
=== Amorphis ===
- Tomi Koivusaari – vocals, rhythm guitar
- Esa Holopainen – lead guitar
- Olli-Pekka Laine – bass guitar
- Jan Rechberger – drums, synthesizer

=== Guest ===
- Jukka Kolehmainen – vocals on "Vulgar Necrolatry"

=== Production ===
- Arranged and produced by Amorphis
- Recorded, engineered and mixed by Timo Tolkki
