= Abhorrence =

Finnish death metal band

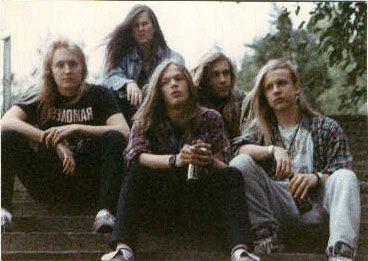

Background information
- Also known as: Rebirth, Unholy Fury (1989)
- Origin: Finland
- Genres: Death metal, death-doom
- Years active: 1989–1990, 2012–present
- Labels: Svart, Seraphic Decay
- Members: Jussi 'Juice' Ahlroth; Tomi Koivusaari; Jukka Kolehmainen; Kalle Mattsson; Waltteri Väyrynen
- Past members: Kimmo Heikkinen; Mika 'Arkki' Arnkil; Rainer 'Raikku' Tuomikanto

Abhorrence is a Finnish death metal band formed in 1989.

== History ==
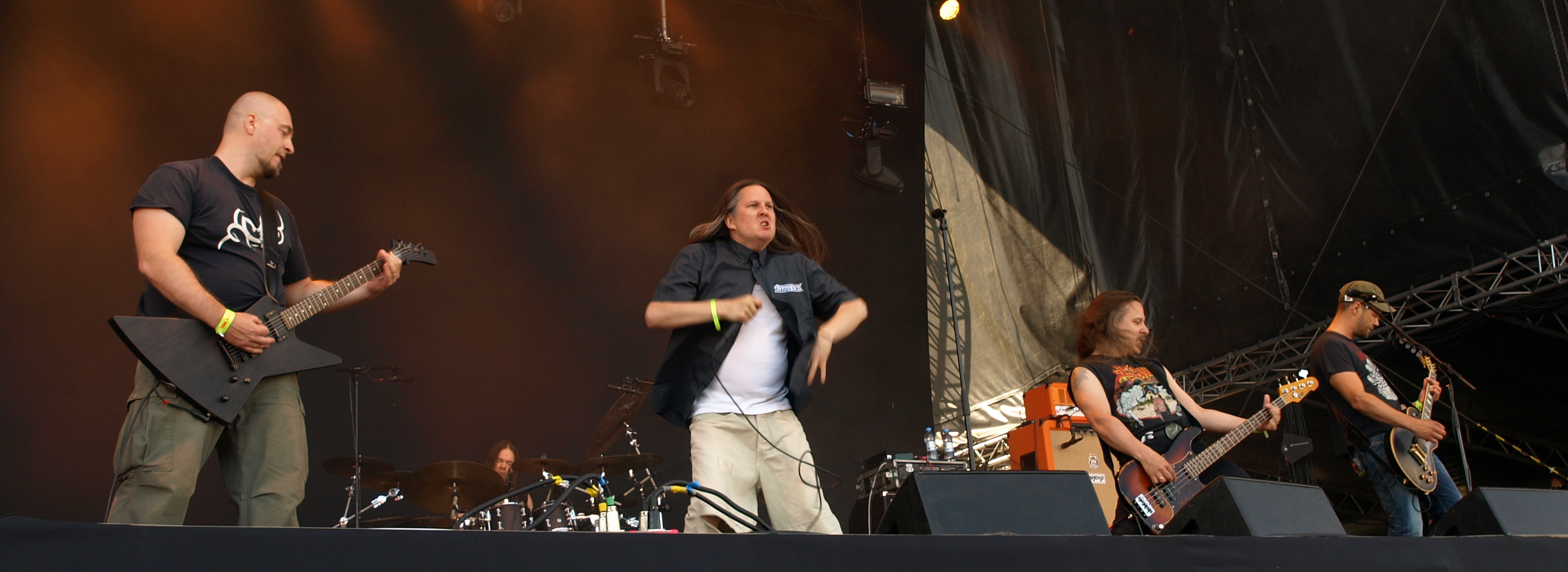
Abhorrence live at Tuska Open Air 2013

Guitarists Tomi Koivusaari (of Violent Solution and Amorphis) and Kalle Mattsson, vocalist Jukka Kolehmainen, bassist Jussi Ahlroth (the latter three whom had played in a band called Disaster), and drummer Kimmo Heikkinen formed Abhorrence in early 1989. They played under several different names before settling on Abhorrence. They performed dozens of concerts alongside Xysma, Disgrace, and Funebre. After recording and releasing the demo tape Vulgar Necrolatry, they released a 7-inch EP on Seraphic Decay Records. Without a written contract, the band lost the master tapes and possible future revenues.

After several more shows around Finland, a short visit to Norway (one show and a party at black metal band Mayhem's house) with their second drummer, Mika Arnkil (on leave from Antidote), the band broke up in 1990. Koivusaari went on to play in Amorphis.

In 2012, Svart Records released their recorded material on CD and vinyl. The Completely Vulgar compilation consists of the band's demo and EP as partially remastered versions, and a live recording from 1990. The double LP version has lo-fi rehearsal recordings. Both versions include two previously unreleased tracks.

In 2013, the original members, except for new drummer Rainer Tuomikanto, reformed for three performances. The first show was at Bar Loose in Helsinki (under alias Bob Horrence) with Deathchain. The other performances were at Tuska Open Air Metal Festival and Hammer Open Air festival.

The performance at Tuska festival was recorded and released as the Totally Vulgar – Live at Tuska 2013 live album in 2017, by Svart Records. The band played in support of the live album's release, with Waltteri Väyrynen as drummer. They played a four-date tour of Finland with Demilich and later a Nummirock festival appearance.

In early 2018, the band announced they had written new music and made an agreement with Svart Records regarding the release of an EP later in the year. They performed some of the new material at concerts on 10.2. at Torvi Bar in Lahti and 24.3. at Kuudes Linja club in Helsinki. Corpse Molester Cult supported them.

== Members ==
Current

- Jussi 'Juice' Ahlroth – bass (1989–present)
- Tomi Koivusaari – guitar (1989–present)
- Jukka Kolehmainen – vocals (1989–present)
- Kalle Mattsson – guitar (1989–present)
- Waltteri Väyrynen – drums (2016–present)

Former

- Rainer 'Raikku' Tuomikanto – drums (2013)
- Mikael 'Arkki' Arnkil – drums (1990)
- Kimmo Heikkinen – drums (1989–1990)

== Discography ==
- Vulgar Necrolatry (demo, 1989)
- Abhorrence 7-inch (EP, 1990)
- Completely Vulgar (CD/2LP, compilation, Svart Records 2012)
- Totally Vulgar – Live at Tuska 2013 (CD/LP, live, Svart Records 2017)
- Megalohydrothassalophobic (CD/EP, Svart Records 2018)

Official releases are available for streaming at Bandcamp.
