= My Kantele =

EP by Amorphis
- Released: 27 May 1997
- Recorded: 1996 (1), December 1996 (2–5)
- Genres: Progressive metal, hard rock, progressive rock
- Length: 24:43
- Label: Relapse
- Producers: Amorphis, Kai "Hiili" Hiilesmaa, Matthew F. Jacobson (exec.), William J. Yurkiewicz Jr. (exec.)

Amorphis chronology
Elegy (1996)	My Kantele (1997)	Tuonela (1999)

Professional ratings
Review scores
Source	Rating
AllMusic	3/5 stars

My Kantele is the second EP by Finnish progressive metal band Amorphis, released in 1997. It is not to be confused with the recording "My Kantele" from the album Elegy, which is not on this compilation, although the title is still used as it contains the acoustic version of "My Kantele" and four previously unreleased songs. The song "My Kantele" is a traditional Finnish song from the 1840 collection Kanteletar, sung by Loituma.

== Track listing ==
No.	Title	Writer(s)	Length
1.	"My Kantele (Acoustic Reprise)"	Esa Holopainen	5:57
2.	"The Brother-Slayer"	Pasi Koskinen	3:37
3.	"The Lost Son (The Brother-Slayer Part II)"	Amorphis	4:35
4.	"Levitation" (Hawkwind cover)	Dave Brock	5:52
5.	"And I Hear You Call" (Kingston Wall cover)	Kingston Wall	4:40
Total length:			24:43

== Personnel ==
=== Amorphis ===
- Pasi Koskinen – vocals
- Esa Holopainen – lead guitar; electric sitar on track 1
- Tomi Koivusaari – rhythm guitar
- Olli-Pekka Laine – bass
- Kim Rantala – keyboards; accordion on track 1
- Pekka Kasari – drums

==== Additional personnel ====
- Mamba – additional percussion on track 3
- Pete "Pee Wee" Coleman – mixing
- Dave Shirk – mastering
- William J. Yurkiewicz Jr. – mastering
- Adam Peterson – design
- Kai "Hiili" Hiilesmaa – engineering
- Dave Brock – songwriting on "Levitation"
