= Silent Waters (Amorphis album) =

Studio album by Amorphis
- Released: 29 August 2007
- Recorded: January–February 2007
- Studio: Sonic Pump Studios, Helsinki
- Genre: Progressive metal, melodic death metal, folk metal
- Length: 46:34 (Standard Release); 51:07 (Reissue)
- Label: Nuclear Blast
- Producer: Marko Hietala and Mikko Karmila

Amorphis chronology
Eclipse (2006)	Silent Waters (2007)	Skyforger (2009)

Professional ratings
Review scores
Source	Rating
About.com	4.5/5 stars
Chronicles of Chaos	9.5/10 stars
MetalUnderground	4.5/5 stars

Silent Waters is the eighth studio album by Finnish progressive metal band Amorphis.

The lyrics are English translations of Finnish poems written by poet Pekka Kainulainen, who wrote them based on the character of Lemminkäinen in the Kalevala.

In February 2008, the record was certified gold in Finland, having sold over 15,000 units.

== Track listing ==
No.	Title	Lyrics	Music	Length
1.	"Weaving the Incantation"	P. Kainulainen	T. Koivusaari	4:57
2.	"A Servant"	P. Kainulainen	S. Kallio	3:35
3.	"Silent Waters"	P. Kainulainen	S. Kallio	4:50
4.	"Towards and Against"	P. Kainulainen	E. Holopainen	4:59
5.	"I of Crimson Blood"	P. Kainulainen	S. Kallio	5:05
6.	"Her Alone"	P. Kainulainen	E. Holopainen	6:01
7.	"Enigma"	P. Kainulainen	E. Holopainen	3:34
8.	"Shaman"	P. Kainulainen	E. Holopainen	4:55
9.	"The White Swan"	P. Kainulainen	T. Koivusaari	4:49
10.	"Black River"	P. Kainulainen	S. Kallio	3:49
Total length:				46:34

Bonus track
No.	Title	Lyrics	Music	Length
11.	"Sign"	P. Kainulainen	T. Joutsen	4:33
Total length:				51:07

== Credits ==
=== Amorphis ===
- Tomi Joutsen − vocals
- Esa Holopainen − lead guitar
- Tomi Koivusaari − rhythm guitar
- Niclas Etelävuori − bass guitar
- Santeri Kallio − keyboards
- Jan Rechberger − drums

=== Other personnel ===
- Marko Hietala − backing vocals, vocal production
- Pekka Kainulainen − lyrics
