= Elegy (Amorphis album) =

Studio album by Amorphis
- Released: 14 May 1996
- Recorded: 1995–1996
- Studios: Sunlight Studio, Stockholm, Sweden; MD Studio, Helsinki, Finland; Finnvox Studios, Helsinki, Finland
- Genres: Progressive metal, folk metal, melodic death metal
- Length: 56:35
- Label: Relapse
- Producer: Amorphis

Amorphis chronology
Tales from the Thousand Lakes (1994)	Elegy (1996)	Tuonela (1999)

Professional ratings
Review scores
Source	Rating
Allmusic	4/5 stars
Metal.de	9/10 stars

Elegy is the third studio album by Finnish progressive metal band Amorphis. It is their first to feature a majority of clean vocals, sung by new vocalist Pasi Koskinen. This also marks the first album with drummer Pekka Kasari who replaced Jan Rechberger and the only album with keyboardist Kim Rantala. The music and lyrics are inspired by the traditional Finnish ballads and poems compiled in the Kanteletar by Elias Lönnrot in 1840.

In 2004, Relapse Records reissued Elegy as a digipak, featuring four live bonus tracks. The songs "Against Widows", "On Rich and Poor", "My Kantele", and "Song of the Troubled One" were all re-recorded on Magic & Mayhem – Tales from the Early Years. "My Kantele" was covered on Live & Acoustic by Thurisaz.

== Track listing ==
No.	Title	Writer(s)	Length
1.	"Better Unborn"	E. Holopainen	5:52
2.	"Against Widows"	O.P. Laine	4:06
3.	"The Orphan"	E. Holopainen, O.P. Laine	5:17
4.	"On Rich and Poor"	E. Holopainen, K. Rantala	5:19
5.	"My Kantele"	E. Holopainen	5:02
6.	"Cares"	T. Koivusaari, E. Holopainen, O.P Laine	4:29
7.	"Song of the Troubled One"	E. Holopainen, O.P. Laine	4:08
8.	"Weeper on the Shore"	O.P. Laine, K. Rantala	4:52
9.	"Elegy"	K. Rantala	7:21
10.	"Relief"	O.P. Laine	4:09
11.	"My Kantele (Acoustic Reprise)"	E. Holopainen	5:55
Total length:			56:35

=== Bonus CDs ===
Live
No.	Title	Note	Length
12.	"Better Unborn"		6:00
13.	"Against Widows"	^{Note 1}	4:05
14.	"The Castaway"	^{Note 1}	4:54
15.	"Black Winter Day"		3:39

My Kantele
No.	Title	Length
12.	"The Brother-Slayer"	3:36
13.	"The Lost Son (The Brother-Slayer Part II)"	4:36
14.	"Levitation (Hawkwind cover)"	5:51
15.	"And I Hear You Call (Kingston Wall cover)"	3:39

=== Notes ===
1. ^Note 1: Songs recorded live at Ilosaarirock, Finland, on 12 July 1997.

== Personnel ==
=== Amorphis ===
- Pasi Koskinen – clean/lead vocals (1–6, 8, 9, 11), occasional growling (2, 6)
- Esa Holopainen – lead guitar
- Tomi Koivusaari – rhythm guitar, co-vocal/death growl (1, 2, 4–9); tambourine
- Olli-Pekka Laine – bass
- Kim Rantala – keyboards
- Pekka Kasari – drums

=== Additional personnel ===
- Mixed at Parr Street Studios, Liverpool, England
- Engineer: Pete Coleman
- Assistant engineer: Dave Buchanan
- Mastered by Dave Shirk at SAE Mastering
- Produced by Amorphis and Hiili Hiilesmaa.
- Executive producers: William J. Yurkiewicz Jr. and Matthew F. Jacobson
- Cover art: Kristian Wåhlin
