= The Karelian Isthmus =

Studio album by Amorphis
- Released: 1 November 1992
- Recorded: April 1992 (The Karelian Isthmus); May 1991 (Privilege of Evil)
- Studios: Sunlight Studios (The Karelian Isthmus); TTT Studio, Helsinki (Privilege of Evil)
- Genres: Death metal, death-doom
- Length: 39:43
- Label: Relapse
- Producers: Amorphis, Tomas Skogsberg

Amorphis chronology
Disment of Soul (1991)	The Karelian Isthmus (1992)	Privilege of Evil (1993)

Professional ratings
Review scores
Source	Rating
AllMusic	4/5 stars

The Karelian Isthmus is the debut studio album by Finnish progressive metal band Amorphis, released in 1992.

Although The Karelian Isthmus took its name from a historic Finnish battleground, Karelian Isthmus, its lyrics focus on Amorphis's well known epic themes from the history of Finnish warfare and religion, but drawing more from Celtic mythology rather than the later traditions of Amorphis's own native land. The epic side is sometimes broken up by the occult lyrical themes in the tracks "Pilgrimage", "Misery Path" and "Black Embrace" that were re-recorded from the Privilege of Evil EP. The album was recorded and released between the recording and release of the EP. Both releases were combined in a 2003 reissue.

This release was the last recorded release to have the original lineup of the band as later on the band would have either additional members or original members quitting. In recent years, songs from this album have been receiving more play during Amorphis' live performances, despite being of a different style than their later works.

== Track listing ==
No.	Title	Lyrics	Music	Length
1.	"Karelia"	Instrumental	T. Koivusaari, E. Holopainen	0:42
2.	"The Gathering"	E. Holopainen	T. Koivusaari	4:12
3.	"Grail's Mysteries"	E. Holopainen	E. Holopainen	3:02
4.	"Warriors Trial"	E. Holopainen	T. Koivusaari, E. Holopainen	5:04
5.	"Black Embrace"	J. Rechberger	T. Koivusaari, E. Holopainen	3:38
6.	"The Exile of the Sons of Uisliu"	E. Holopainen	E. Holopainen	3:43
7.	"The Lost Name of God"	J. Rechberger	E. Holopainen, T. Koivusaari, J. Rechberger	5:32
8.	"The Pilgrimage"	E. Holopainen	T. Koivusaari	4:39
9.	"Misery Path"	E. Holopainen	E. Holopainen, T. Koivusaari, J. Rechberger	4:17
10.	"The Sign from the North Side"	E. Holopainen	E. Holopainen, T. Koivusaari, O.P. Laine	4:54
Total length:				39:43

Bonus Track
No.	Title	Lyrics	Music	Length
11.	"Vulgar Necrolatry (Abhorrence cover)"	J. Ahlroth	T. Koivusaari	4:21
Total length:				44:04

2003 Reissue (Privilege of Evil EP)
No.	Title	Writer(s)	Length
12.	"Pilgrimage from Darkness"	Amorphis	4:32
13.	"Black Embrace"	E. Holopainen, T. Koivusaari, J. Rechberger	3:25
14.	"Privilege of Evil"	Amorphis	3:50
15.	"Misery Path"	E. Holopainen, T. Koivusaari, J. Rechberger	4:17
16.	"Vulgar Necrolatry"	T. Koivusaari, J. Ahlroth	3:58
17.	"Excursing from Existence"	Amorphis	3:06
Total length:			23:10

== Personnel ==
=== Amorphis ===
- Tomi Koivusaari − vocals, rhythm guitar
- Esa Holopainen − lead guitar
- Olli-Pekka Laine − bass
- Jan Rechberger − drums, keyboards

=== Additional personnel ===
- Tomas Skogsberg – mixing and engineering
- Dave Shirk – mastering
- Scott Hull – remastering (at Visceral Sound)
- Miran Kim – cover art
- Jukka Kolehmainen – vocals on "Vulgar Necrolatry"
- Timo Tolkki – recording, engineering and mixing on Privilege of Evil EP
