= Tuonela (album) =

Studio album by Amorphis
- Released: 29 March 1999
- Recorded: October–November 1998
- Studio: Finnvox Studios, Helsinki, Finland
- Genre: Progressive metal, folk metal
- Length: 46:48
- Label: Relapse, Nuclear Blast
- Producer: Simon Efemey

Amorphis chronology
| My Kantele (1997) | Tuonela (1999) | Story – 10th Anniversary (2000) |

Singles from Tuonela
- 1. "Divinity / Northern Lights" Released: 6 February 1999

Professional ratings
Review scores
| Source | Rating |
|---|---|
| AllMusic | 2.5/5 stars |

Tuonela is the fourth studio album by Finnish progressive metal band Amorphis.

This marks the first album by the band to feature Santeri Kallio on keyboards who performed as a session member and joined the band after in 1998. The album is named from Tuonela, the realm of the dead in Finnish mythology. The album also shares inspiration with many of the band's productions in the text and themes of the Kalevala, or Finnish Epic.

This album was the last release with original and long time bassist, Olli-Pekka Laine, until his return on 2018's Queen of Time. Laine quit a year after this release in 2000, because of musical differences and to focus on his family.

== Track listing ==
All lyrics are written by Pasi Koskinen, except track ten by Antti Litmanen; all music is composed by Amorphis.

| No. | Title | Length |
|---|---|---|
| 1. | "The Way" | 4:35 |
| 2. | "Morning Star" | 3:50 |
| 3. | "Nightfall" | 3:52 |
| 4. | "Tuonela" | 4:32 |
| 5. | "Greed" | 4:17 |
| 6. | "Divinity" | 4:56 |
| 7. | "Shining" | 4:24 |
| 8. | "Withered" | 5:44 |
| 9. | "Rusty Moon" | 4:56 |
| 10. | "Summer's End" | 5:37 |
| Total length: | | 46:48 |

Japanese release and Australian release bonus tracks
| No. | Title | Length |
|---|---|---|
| 11. | "Northern Lights" (Recorded during Tuonela session) | 3:17 |

Mexican release bonus tracks
| No. | Title | Length |
|---|---|---|
| 11. | "Northern Lights" (Recorded during Tuonela session) | 3:17 |
| 12. | "The Brother-Slayer" (Originally from My Kantele EP) | 3:37 |
| 13. | "The Lost Sun (The Brother-Slayer Pt II)" (Originally from My Kantele EP) | 4:36 |

German limited digipak and Limited editions from Russia and Ukraine bonus tracks
| No. | Title | Length |
|---|---|---|
| 11. | "Weeper on the Shore (live in Essen, Germany 1997)" (Video) | 4:46 |
| 12. | "Against Widows (Ilosaarirock Festival Finland 1997)" (Video) | 4:01 |

== Personnel ==
Amorphis

- Pasi Koskinen – vocals
- Tomi Koivusaari – rhythm guitars, sitar ("Greed")
- Esa Holopainen – lead guitars, acoustic guitars
- Olli-Pekka Laine – bass guitar
- Pekka Kasari – drums, percussion

Session musicians

- Santeri Kallio – keyboards
- Sakari Kukko – saxophone ("Nightfall" & "Tuonela"), flute ("Rusty Moon")
