= Tales from the Thousand Lakes =

Studio album by Amorphis
- Released: 12 July 1994
- Recorded: September 1993
- Genre: Melodic death metal, death-doom, gothic metal
- Length: 40:13
- Label: Relapse
- Producer: Tomas Skogsberg and Amorphis

Amorphis chronology
Privilege of Evil (1993)	Tales from the Thousand Lakes (1994)	Elegy (1996)

Singles from Tales from the Thousand Lakes
- 1. "Black Winter Day" Released: 1994

Professional ratings
Review scores
Source	Rating
AllMusic	4/5 stars

Tales from the Thousand Lakes is the second studio album by Finnish progressive metal band Amorphis, released on 12 July 1994 through Relapse Records.

Publications consider it to be the band's landmark album. It is the most commercially successful Relapse release, selling over 100,000 copies.

== Background and release ==
This is the first Amorphis release to have an official keyboardist, Kasper Mårtenson, as any previous of the band's releases had the band's own drummer, Jan Rechberger, provide the empty keyboardist role until the band decided to have a keyboardist and also to find one being Mårtenson. With Mårtenson in the band, it is the first time the band's original lineup changed by having an additional member. Jan Rechberger would leave the band after this album but rejoin the band for 2003's Far from the Sun.

The original limited version (on digipack) had a cover of "Light My Fire" by The Doors added as a bonus track. It was later re-released in 2001 with most tracks from the Black Winter Day EP and the "Light My Fire" cover added as bonus tracks.

== Music and lyrics ==
The album was an influential release in the development of the melodic death metal genre, predominantly mixing the genre with death-doom and gothic metal, compared to the band's death metal debut. The music is considered to be less extreme than other melodic death metal releases, incorporating heavy metal singing in addition to death growls on some tracks. The instrumentation draws from neo-prog. This showcases a more melodic sound for the band, with hints at their later, more progressive direction. The album also introduced synthesizers and clean vocals to the band's sound, though the latter was used sparingly. It is a concept album based on the Finnish national epic, Kalevala.

The album's song structures are considered to be progressive. The album also has elements of psychedelic music and folk music.

== Legacy ==
According to Tom Morris of Invisible Oranges: "The influence of Amorphis’ second album can be heard in countless branches of the history of metal. The Finnish band’s incorporation of their homeland’s native melodies and lyrics based on epic poetry had a clear impact on the development of folk metal, while the kinetic riffs of “Drowning Maid” and melodies of “Black Winter Day” laid down foundations for the then-burgeoning melodic death metal genre." AllMusic gave the album four stars.

== Track listing ==
No.	Title	Lyrics	Music	Length
1.	"Thousand Lakes"	(instrumental)	K. Mårtenson	2:04
2.	"Into Hiding"	traditional	E. Holopainen, O.P. Laine	3:45
3.	"The Castaway"	traditional	T. Koivusaari, E. Holopainen, O.P. Laine, K. Mårtenson	5:32
4.	"First Doom"	E. Holopainen	E. Holopainen	3:52
5.	"Black Winter Day"	traditional	K. Mårtenson	3:50
6.	"Drowned Maid"	traditional	T. Koivusaari, E. Holopainen, O.P. Laine	4:23
7.	"In the Beginning"	traditional	E. Holopainen, O.P. Laine	3:37
8.	"Forgotten Sunrise"	E. Holopainen	E. Holopainen	4:53
9.	"To Fathers Cabin"	traditional	E. Holopainen, O.P. Laine	3:50
10.	"Magic and Mayhem"	traditional	E. Holopainen	4:27
Total length:				40:13

=== Bonus tracks ===
Tracks 11–13 added from the Black Winter Day EP; track 14 is a bonus track:

No.	Title	Lyrics	Music	Length
11.	"Folk of the North"	(instrumental)	T. Koivusaari	1:17
12.	"Moon and Sun"	traditional	T. Koivusaari	3:36
13.	"Moon and Sun Part II: North's Son"	traditional	T. Koivusaari	5:10
14.	"Light My Fire" (The Doors cover)	The Doors	The Doors	2:53
Total length:				12:56

== Credits ==
=== Band members ===
- Tomi Koivusaari – vocals, rhythm guitar
- Esa Holopainen – lead guitar
- Olli-Pekka Laine – bass
- Jan Rechberger – drums
- Kasper Mårtenson – keyboards

=== Additional musicians ===
- Ville Tuomi – clean vocals, speech

Art

- Sv Bell - Cover artist
