= Amorphis =

Finnish progressive metal band

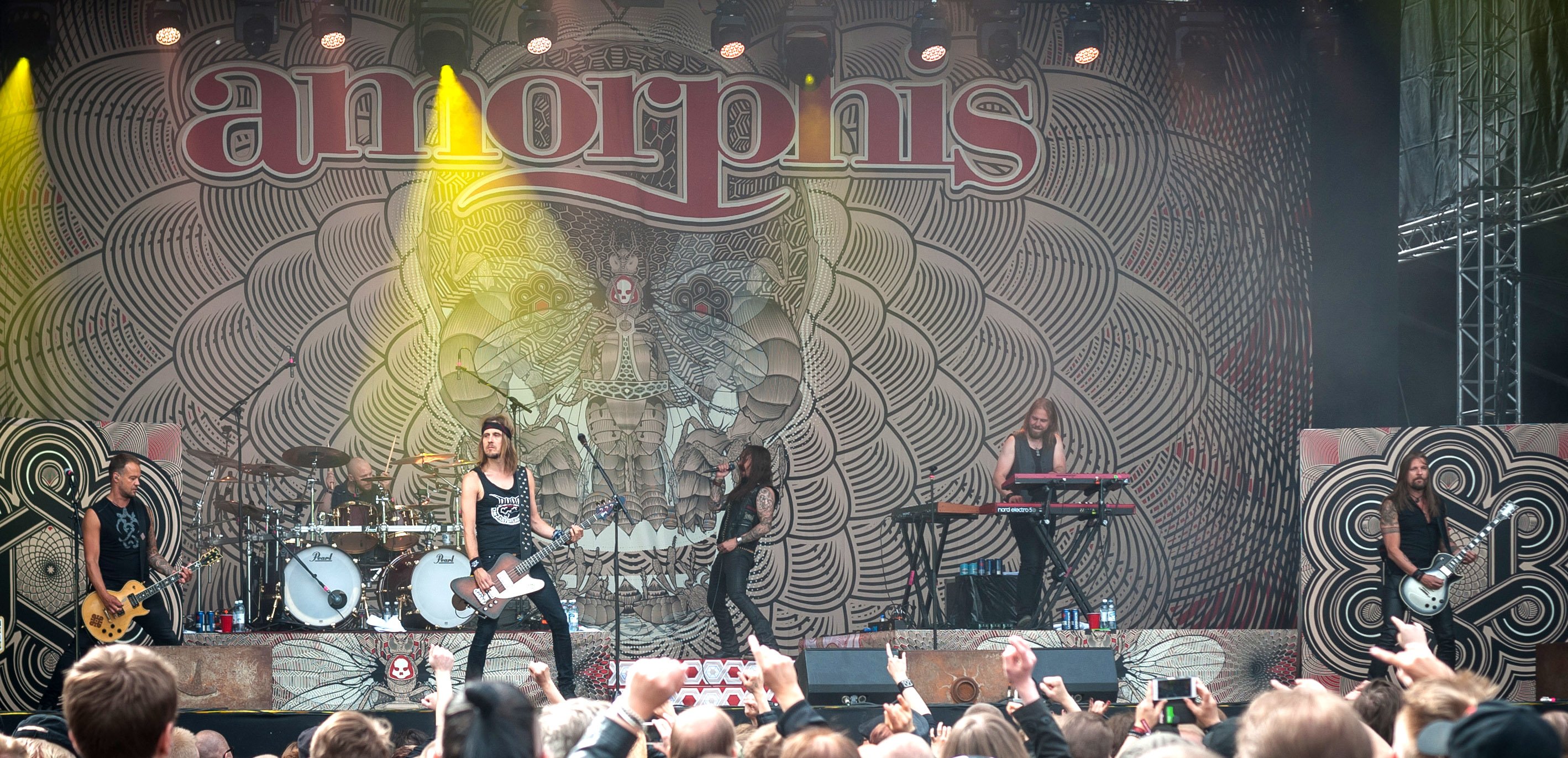
- Amorphis performing in 2018

Background information
- Origin: Helsinki, Finland
- Genres: Progressive metal; melodic death metal; folk metal; death-doom (early)
- Years active: 1990–present
- Labels: Virgin (2003); EMI; Relapse; Nuclear Blast; Mojo; Mystic; Victor (JVC); Spinefarm; Atomic Fire; RPM
- Members: Esa Holopainen; Tomi Koivusaari; Jan Rechberger; Olli-Pekka Laine; Santeri Kallio; Tomi Joutsen
- Past members: See former members
- Website: amorphis.net

Amorphis is a Finnish progressive metal band founded by Jan Rechberger, Tomi Koivusaari, and Esa Holopainen in 1990. Initially, the band was a death metal act, but on later albums they evolved into playing other genres, including progressive metal, folk metal, and melodic death metal. They frequently use the Kalevala, the epic poem of Finland, as a source for their lyrics.

== History ==
=== Disment of Soul and The Karelian Isthmus ===
Jan Rechberger played in a thrash metal band called Violent Solution, which Tomi Koivusaari had left in 1990 to form the death metal band Abhorrence, with Koivusaari being replaced with Esa Holopainen. As Violent Solution slowly dissolved, Jan Rechberger and Esa Holopainen continued working together to form their own death metal band, Amorphis. With Rechberger having ties with Koivusaari, in early 1990, Koivusaari became the vocalist and the band also got Oppu Laine to become their bassist. During that time, Koivusaari also performed rhythm guitar, leading to the band dumping all original compositions and starting over again. Koivusaari's other band, Abhorrence, split up, and he had more time to put into Amorphis.

A demo tape, Disment of Soul, was recorded in 1991 by Timo Tolkki at TTT studios. It was meant to be Dismemberment of soul but they forgot the word "member."

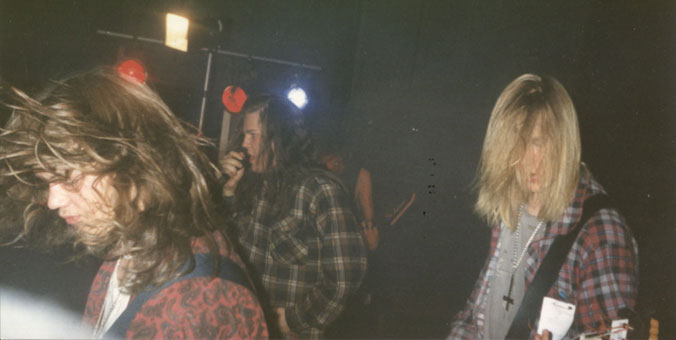
Amorphis in 1992 with Jukka Kolehmainen of Abhorrence

After the band recorded their first studio demo tape, Relapse Records offered Abhorrence a recording contract. Since Abhorrence was no longer active, they sent their own demo in the return mail and were signed to a worldwide recording deal. Soon after getting signed, they released their debut, The Karelian Isthmus, under the new name Amorphis, and later released the Privilege of Evil EP. The EP featured Abhorrence's original vocalist, Jukka Kolehmainen, on the Abhorrence cover song, "Vulgar Necrolatry".

=== Tales from the Thousand Lakes ===
In 1994, Amorphis released their second album, Tales from the Thousand Lakes, a concept album based on the Finnish national epic, the Kalevala. This 1994 release, while still rooted in death metal, was their first step toward a new direction as melodic clean vocals were added, provided by Ville Tuomi. Tales from the Thousand Lakes won the band a fan base thanks to its innovative sound and fusion of death metal with traditional folk, psychedelia, and progressive elements. This album went on to influence the signature Amorphis sound.

=== Elegy ===
During the subsequent tours, Martenson (keyboards) left the band, to be replaced by Kim Rantala. Rechberger was replaced by Pekka Kasari (ex-Stone), and a sixth member was recruited, singer Pasi Koskinen. The third album, Elegy, was released in 1996. Lyrics were again adapted from Finnish folklore, in this case, the Kanteletar, a collection of ancient folk poetry. Pasi and Tomi shared the vocals on an equal basis, with Pasi providing only clean parts. After a year and a half of touring following the release of Elegy, the band members took a hiatus.

=== Tuonela and Story: 10th Anniversary ===
Their next offering, 1999's Tuonela, was a mellow guitar album, although toward the end of the studio sessions, Santeri Kallio of Kyyria was brought in to add some keyboard tracks to the songs. New instruments were introduced (Tomi playing sitar in the song "Greed", Sakari Kukko on saxophone and flute providing a foreign accent) and the death growls were reduced, as all vocals were performed by Pasi.

The band experienced another line-up change. Following the breakup of Kyyria, Santeri joined Amorphis as a full-time member. Bassist Oppu was replaced by another ex-Kyyria member, Niclas Etelävuori, to tour with Amorphis on their third United States tour.

The tenth-anniversary compilation Story was released.

=== Am Universum ===
Am Universum was released in 2001, and included more emphasis on keyboards and saxophone work, the latter contributed by Sakari Kukko. It was an experimental album and Amorphis' most psychedelic to date.

=== Far from the Sun and Chapters ===
In 2002, the band contributed to the soundtrack for the movie Menolippu Mombasaan. The commissioned piece was a cover version of a 1976 Finnish pop hit "Kuusamo", and is as of 2024 the band's only song in their native language. The same year they started to record the band's last album with Relapse Records, Far from the Sun. In 2003, Relapse released the retrospective Chapters, which included a DVD featuring the band's videos from "Black Winter Day" to "Alone". Far from the Sun was produced by the band itself, which had been rejoined by original drummer Jan Rechberger after Pekka Kasari had quit to concentrate on family duties. Pasi left the band in 2004 after nine years.

=== Eclipse ===
While searching for a new vocalist Amorphis received over a hundred demo tapes from prospective vocalists but none of them became the new frontman of the band. Eventually Tomi Joutsen got an audition through word of mouth and he became their next singer in 2005. Joutsen, best known for his work with metal band Sinisthra, urged Amorphis to return to the use of contrasting vocal styles for their next album. His first album with the band, Eclipse, was released in 2006. It was a critical and commercial success, hailed as a return to form by some critics, and achieving gold certification in Finland for the first time in their history.

Just after Joutsen joined, Amorphis performed under name Amorjens ("aHello" in Finnish) to perform at least one gig in Finland.

=== Silent Waters ===
Amorphis followed Eclipse with gigs and festival appearances throughout Europe, all the while writing new material for the follow-up. They released their next album, Silent Waters, on 3 September 2007, achieving gold certification in Finland for the second time. The album marked the first time in the history of the band that an album was recorded with the same personnel as the previous one. In support of Silent Waters, Amorphis launched their third headlining tour in North America alongside supporting acts Samael and Virgin Black.

=== Skyforger and Magic & Mayhem – Tales from the Early Years ===
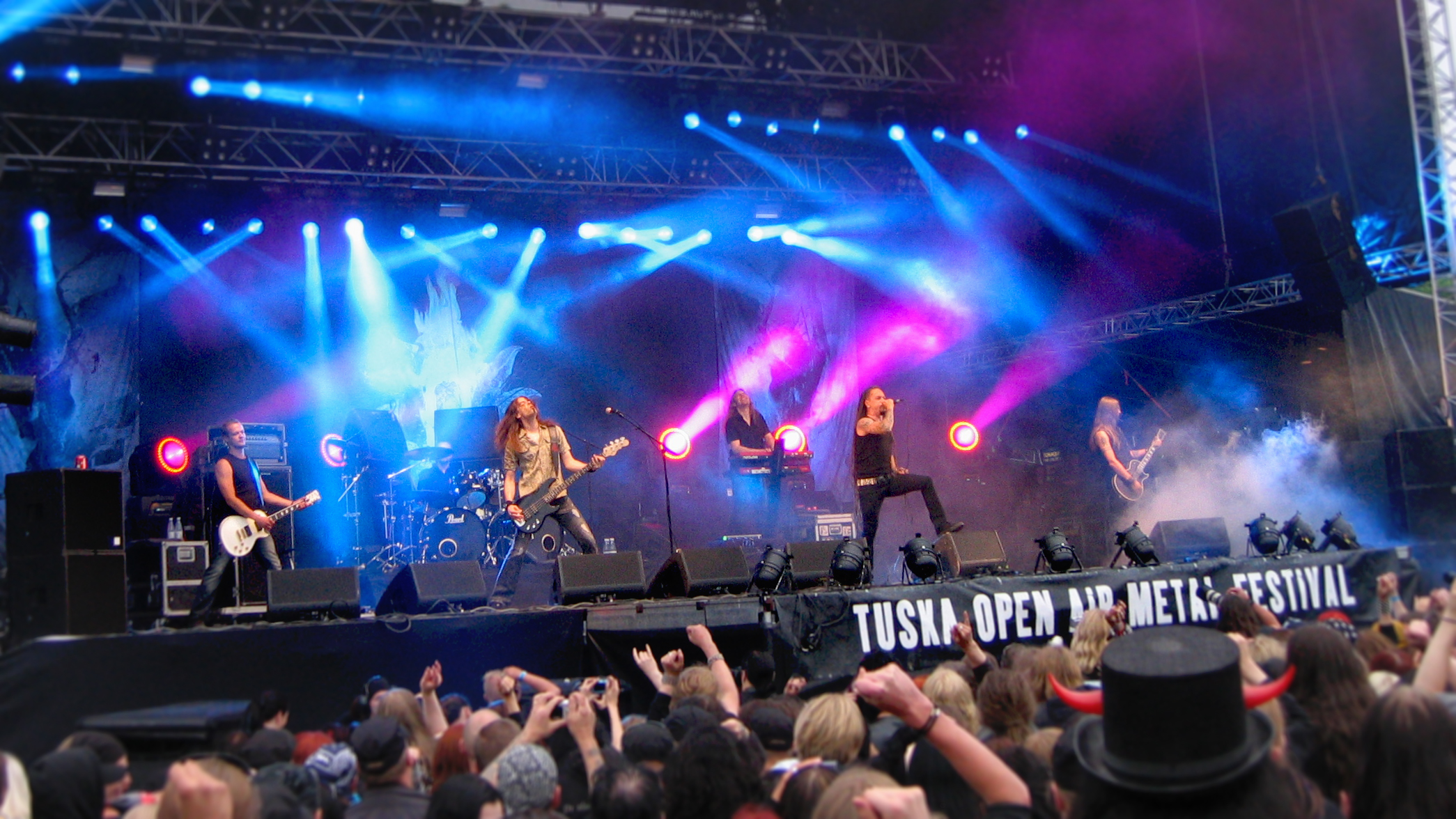
Amorphis playing at Tuska 2009

In November 2008, Amorphis entered Sonic Pump Studios to begin recording their 9th album. The result of those studio sessions, Skyforger, was released in Finland on 27 May 2009, throughout Europe two days later, and in the United States on 16 June. Initial presses of the album had mastering errors, which prompted Nuclear Blast to issue replacement CDs. The album was certified gold in Finland on 7 July 2011, making it the third Amorphis album in a row to do so.

On 20 November 2009, while touring in support of Skyforger, Amorphis filmed a show at Club Teatria in Oulu, Finland for their first-ever live DVD. The show was released alongside another show from Summer Breeze Open Air 2009 and a documentary, titled Tales from the 20 Years, as a part of the CD/DVD set Forging the Land of Thousand Lakes on 25 June 2010.

On 15 September 2010, Amorphis released Magic & Mayhem – Tales from the Early Years, a re-working of a dozen tracks from their first three albums with slightly different arrangements, better audio quality and featuring the band's current lineup, plus a cover of "Light my Fire" as a bonus track. During the tour that followed, the band briefly reunited with Pasi Koskinen and other past members (such as keyboard player Kim Rantala) on stage, to perform some of the older songs.

=== The Beginning of Times ===
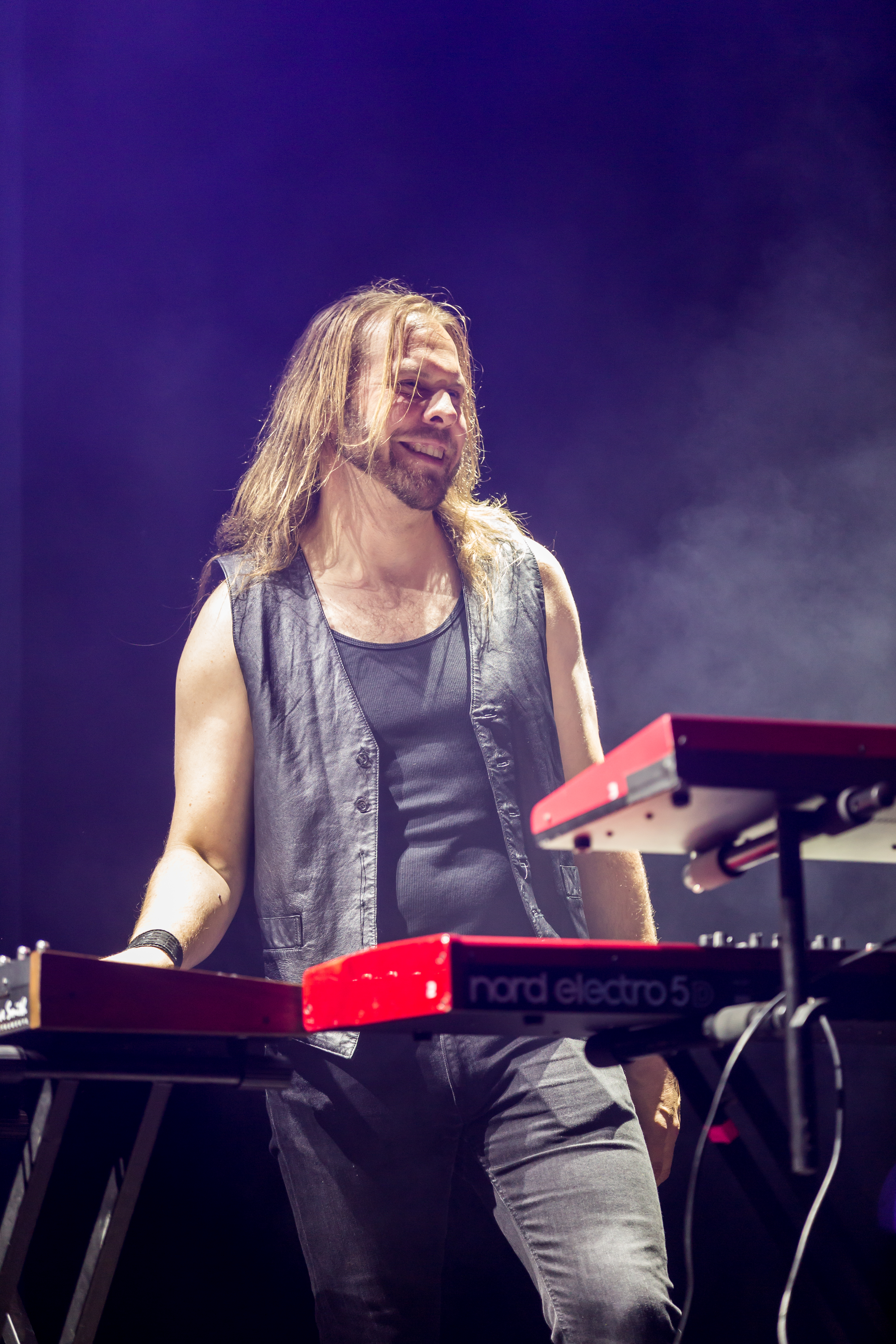
Santeri Kallio at Metal Frenzy Festival 2017 in Gardelegen

On 30 September 2010, Nuclear Blast announced that Amorphis had started work on a new album. On 24 January 2011, the band revealed that recording was almost finished, except for vocals which would be completed at the home of producer Marko Hietala. The album The Beginning of Times was released on 27 May 2011 in Europe and 7 June 2011 in the United States, and features cover art by longtime collaborator Travis Smith.

=== Circle ===
On 21 August 2012, Amorphis announced on their website that a new album was in the works. On 17 January 2013, the band announced the title and release date for their next record. Circle was released on 19 April in Europe and 30 April in North America. Tomi Joutsen said about the new album, "Circle represents integrity. Back in the days, when there was something special to talk about, wise men used to sit in circle. Not everyone was invited to join them. But in this story, the protagonist was invited among the wise men's circle."

On 16 September 2013, Circle won Metal Hammer's "Album of the Year" award. Esa Holopainen said about the award, "For us, Album of the Year award is a great recognition for the work done so far. Especially when we got it from our 11th studio album."

On 4 August 2014, Amorphis announced on their website and through social media that they would be playing a number of special Tales from the Thousand Lakes 20th anniversary shows where their 1994 album would be performed in its entirety. The shows included festivals such as Wacken Open Air, Maryland Deathfest, and 70000 Tons of Metal, with many other tour dates and festivals included.

=== Under the Red Cloud ===
The band began demoing new songs at the start of 2015, and on 4 March, it was announced that Amorphis would begin to record a new album in April at Fascination Street Studio in Örebro with Jens Bogren, with a release date sometime in September 2015.

The lyrics were written once again by Pekka Kainulainen, who said, "Like 'Kalevala', they are descriptions of natural phenomena, seasons and the human mind. Reoccurring situations where hope and uncertainty alternate. Attempting to gain advice from higher powers. The poems do not form a complete story per se, but they are drawn together by a certain theme. We live under a red cloud and once again, time weighs us."

The release of the new album was followed by a world tour, starting with shows in the band's home country of Finland, then other parts of Europe with Nightwish and Arch Enemy in November 2015.

On 15 June 2015, the band announced the upcoming twelfth album titled Under the Red Cloud, with the artwork and track list revealed and with a release date of 4 September 2015.

=== Queen of Time ===
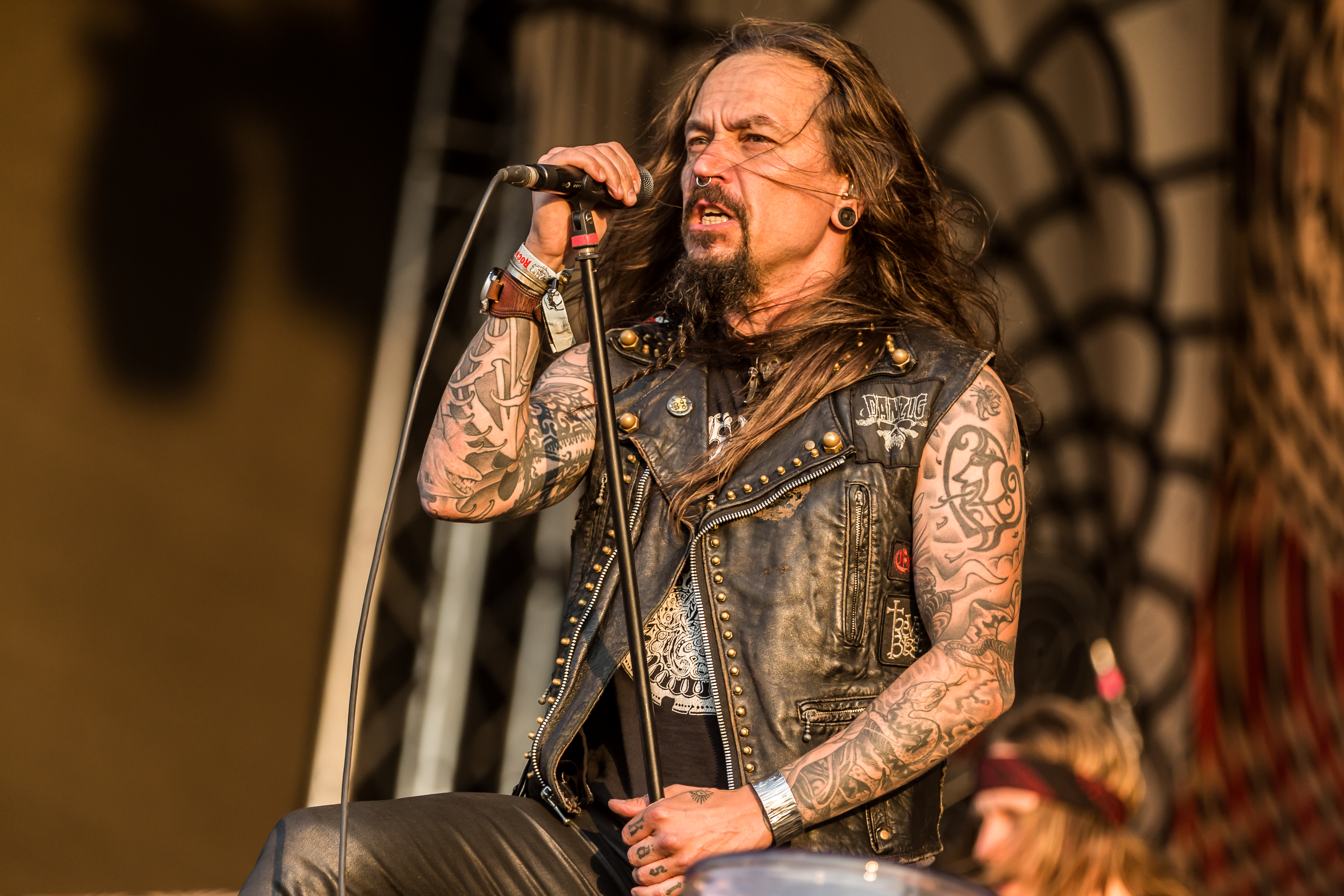
Singer Tomi Joutsen at Rockharz Open Air 2018

On 22 February 2018, Amorphis announced they had finished recording their thirteenth studio album Queen of Time, which was released on 18 May 2018 via Nuclear Blast Records. The album recording process featured the band's former bass player Olli-Pekka 'Oppu' Laine replacing Amorphis' longtime bassist Niclas Etelävuori, who left in April 2017 after their North American tour due to disagreements with the band's management, making this the first time since Tales from the Thousand Lakes that all the original band members had played on an album together. On 23 March 2018, the band released the first single, "The Bee", off the record.

=== Halo ===
On 24 February 2022, Amorphis released its 14th studio album, Halo, marking the band's 30th anniversary since the release of its 1992 debut record, The Karelian Isthmus. The band struggled with various complications related to the Covid-19 pandemic while recording the album. This album is also more guitar-driven and "heavier" than Queen of Time. The album has been received well by both fans and critics, landing on top of the charts in Finland and in top-10 charts in many other countries. As of March 2022, two songs from the album have been released with full music videos ("The Moon" and "On the Dark Waters"). The album continues to draw heavily on Finnish folklore, with references to Tuonela, the underworld realm of Finnish and Estonian mythology.

The band toured throughout 2023. Their 2025 album Borderland was elected by Loudwire as one of the 11 best progressive metal albums of 2025. The band will tour Australia for the first time in over ten years in 2026.

== Musical style ==
Amorphis began as a death metal and death-doom band, and later began to incorporate and combine other musical styles, such as progressive metal, melodic death metal, viking metal, folk metal and psychedelic music. The band's music incorporates orchestra and classical music styles as well. Loudwire categorized them as progressive death metal, saying: "When you think of Finnish prog-death with orchestral/classical touches, you think of Amorphis, plain and simple."

== Band members ==
=== Current members ===
- Esa Holopainen – lead guitar (1990–present)
- Tomi Koivusaari – rhythm guitar, backing vocals (1990–present), lead vocals (1990–1998)
- Santeri Kallio – keyboards (1998–present)
- Jan Rechberger – drums (1990–1996, 2002–present), studio keyboards (1990–1993)
- Tomi Joutsen – lead vocals (2005–present)
- Pyry Hanski – bass, backing vocals (2026–present; touring)

=== Former members ===
- Kasper Mårtenson – keyboards (1993–1994)
- Kim Rantala – keyboards (1994–1998)
- Marko Waara – lead vocals (1995)
- Pekka Kasari – drums (1995–2002)
- Pasi Koskinen – lead vocals (1995–2004)
- Janne Puurtinen – keyboards (1998)
- Niclas Etelävuori – bass (2000–2017)
- Olli-Pekka Laine – bass, backing vocals (1990–2000, 2017–present; hiatus 2026–present)

=== Guest members ===
- Ville Tuomi – lead vocals (1993–1995, 2010)

== Discography ==
Studio albums

- The Karelian Isthmus (1992)
- Tales from the Thousand Lakes (1994)
- Elegy (1996)
- Tuonela (1999)
- Am Universum (2001)
- Far from the Sun (2003)
- Eclipse (2006)
- Silent Waters (2007)
- Skyforger (2009)
- The Beginning of Times (2011)
- Circle (2013)
- Under the Red Cloud (2015)
- Queen of Time (2018)
- Halo (2022)
- Borderland (2025)
