= Silvër Horizon =

Studio album by Diablo
- Released: 18 September 2015
- Studio: Fantom Studios, Finnvox Studios
- Genre: Melodic death metal, thrash metal, groove metal
- Length: 51:05
- Label: Sakara Rekords

Diablo chronology
Icaros	Silvër Horizon

Singles from Silver Horizon
- 1. "Isolation"

Silvër Horizon is the sixth studio album of Finnish melodic heavy metal band Diablo. It was released in Finland 18 September 2015 and in Central Europe 30 October 2015.

The album made it to No. 1 in Finnish official charts for the week 39/2015 as Mimic 47 did in year 2006. The albums Icaros and Eternium also went to top 3 back when they were released.

There was seven years between this and previous album of Diablo, Icaros, which was released in May 2008. The Songs of Silver Horizon were composed and their lyrics were written in the same order they are listed in the album. The story that develops through the songs is loosely based on the sci-fi book Aniara written by Harry Martinson.

== Track listing ==
Composition and lyrics: Marko Utriainen and Rainer Nygård, unless otherwise stated.

No.	Title	Length
1.	"The Call"	4:40
2.	"Isolation"	4:34
3.	"The Serpent Holder"	4:52
4.	"Into the Void"	4:16
5.	"Illuminati"	5:14
6.	"Prince of the Machine" (Utriainen, Nygård, Sami Lopakka)	5:22
7.	"Silver Horizon"	4:48
8.	"Savage"	6:26
9.	"Corium Black" (Utriainen, Nygård, Aadolf Virtanen)	5:23
10.	"Voyage to eternity"	5:22
Total length:		51:05

== Credits ==
- Heikki Malmberg – drums
- Rainer Nygård – rhythm guitar, vocals
- Marko Utriainen – lead guitar
- Aadolf Virtanen – bass, backing vocals
- Keijo Niinimaa, Samu Oittinen, Markku Kivistö, Tuomo Saikkonen, Kuisma aalto, Niko Rauhala – backing vocals
- Jenna-Miia Kaivosoja – backing vocals on track 10
- Ekaterina "Lucky" Andryushina – female voice on track 1
- Erkki Seppänen – male voice on tracks 9 and 10
- Samu Oittinen – recording, mixing
- Mika Jussila – engineer
- Miikka Tikka – design
- Harri Hinkka – photography

== Chart performance ==
Chart (2015)	Peak position
Finnish Albums (Suomen virallinen lista)	1
