= Uudet kymmenen käskyä =

Studio album by Stam1na
- Released: 10 May 2006
- Genre: Thrash metal
- Length: 49:58
- Label: Sakara Records

Stam1na chronology
Stam1na (2005)	Uudet kymmenen käskyä (2006)	Raja (2008)

Uudet kymmenen käskyä is the second album by Finnish thrash metal band Stam1na. It was released on 10 May 2006 and reached No. 3 on the Finnish albums chart. In March 2007, the album was chosen as the Metal Album of 2006 at the Emma Awards, arranged by the Finnish recording industry.

The single "Likainen parketti" went to No. 1 on the Finnish singles chart. Another song, Edessäni, was released as an Internet-only digi-single.

== Track listing ==
1. Uudet kymmenen käskyä (4:42) "The New Ten Commandments"
2. Merestä maalle (4:01) "From Ocean To Land"
3. Edessäni (4:11) "In Front Of Me"
4. Viisi laukausta päähän (3:53) "Five Shots To The Head"
5. Vapaa maa (4:43) "Free Nation"
6. Lapsus (3:48) "Lapse"
7. Paperinukke (4:02) "Paper Doll"
8. Suhdeluku (3:42) "Ratio / Affair Count"
9. Likainen parketti (4:48) "Dirty/Messy Parquet"
10. Ovi (4:43) "The Door"
11. Kaksi reittiä yksi suunta (5:23) "Two Routes One Direction"

== Personnel ==
- Antti Hyyrynen – vocals, backing vocals, guitar
- Kai-Pekka Kangasmäki – bass, backing vocals
- Pekka Olkkonen – lead guitar
- Teppo Velin – drums

=== Additional musicians ===
- Sami Kujala – backing vocals
- Emil Lähteenmäki – keyboards
- Jouni Hynynen, Kaarle Viikate, Rainer Nygård, Tuomo Saikkonen – additional vocals on track 4

=== Production ===
- Miitri Aaltonen – producer, engineer, mixing, vocal arrangements
- Mika Jussila – mastering
- Ville Hyyrynen – artwork
