= Marko Annala =

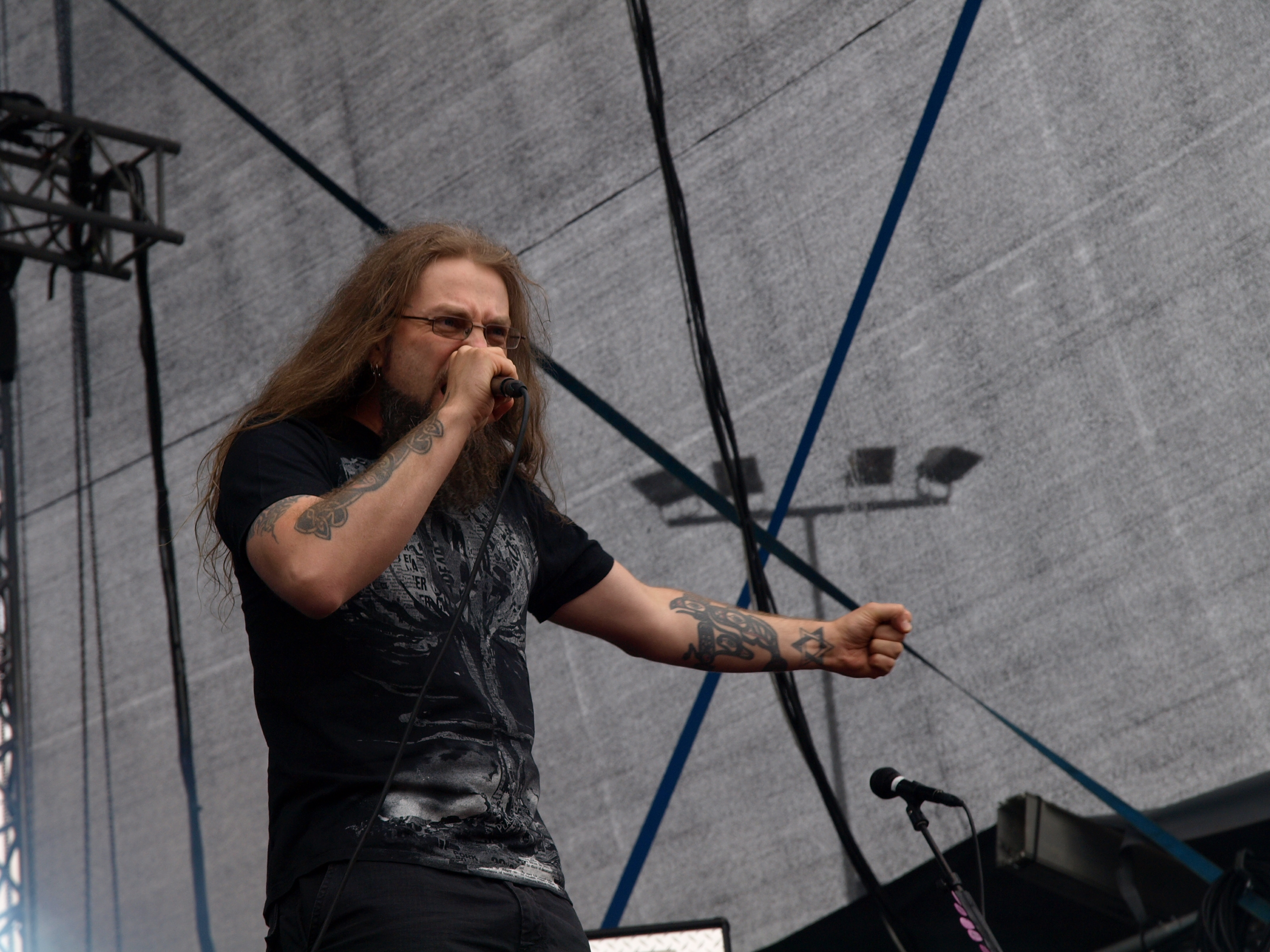
- Marko Annala performing at Myötätuulirock in June 2011.

Background information
- Born: October 5, 1972 (age 53); Joutseno, Finland
- Genre: Thrash metal
- Occupations: Musician, author
- Instruments: Vocals, electric guitar
- Label: Sakara Records

Marko Kristian Annala (born 1972 in Joutseno) is a Finnish musician and author. He is the founder, lead vocalist, and primary songwriter of the metal band Mokoma. Annala is known for his distinct vocal style, which combines elements of death metal growling and clear Finnish-language rock singing.

During the early days of Mokoma (formed in 1996), Annala played guitar in addition to singing. He has also played guitar in the bands Slumgudgeon and Pronssinen Pokaali, and appeared as a guest on the Kotiteollisuus albums Aamen (1998) and Eevan perintö (1999). In several interviews, he has compared himself as a lyricist to Jarkko Martikainen. In 2008, Annala was voted Vocalist of the Year at the Finnish Metal Awards. He has also written songs for other artists, including the track "Kuule minua" by Haloo Helsinki!.

Annala has published the novels Värityskirja (2017), Paasto (2018), and Kuutio (2020). His debut novel, the autobiographical Värityskirja, won the Tiiliskivi Award. Annala ran as a candidate for parliament in the 1991 Finnish parliamentary election for the Pensioners' and Green Joint Responsibility Party in the Kymi constituency, receiving 99 votes.

In 2026, Annala launched a solo career under the name Alter Annala. His debut solo album, Alert!, was released on 21 August 2026. According to Annala, the solo project began in 2024 out of musical ideas that did not fit the framework of Mokoma. The album blends influences from post-punk, hip hop, and electronic music.

== Personal life ==
Annala's spouse is Muay Thai fighter and author Inga Magga. They have three children and live in Tampere. Annala has been a teetotaler since 1992. He was previously a vegetarian, but returned to an omnivorous diet after finding it difficult to eat properly while touring. Annala is an Eastern Orthodox Christian.

== Discography ==
=== Kotiteollisuus ===
- Aamen (1998, arrangements on "Routa ei lopu" and "Päällekirjoitus")
- Eevan perintö (1999, guitar on "Saattoväki")

=== Pronssinen Pokaali ===
- Pronssinen Pokaali (1996, guitar)
- Kuvia (1998, guitar)

=== Slumgudgeon ===
- Durga EP (1992, guitar)
- ...And On What Grounds? (1993, guitar)
- Factoraped (1995, guitar)

=== Alter Annala ===
- Alert! (2026)

== Novels ==
- Värityskirja. Helsinki: Like. 2017. ISBN 978-952-01-1605-7.
- Paasto. Helsinki: Like. 2018. ISBN 978-952-01-1810-5.
- Kuutio. Helsinki: Like. 2020. ISBN 978-951-1-36693-5.
