= Raja (album) =

Studio album by Stam1na
- Released: 15 February 2008
- Genre: Thrash metal
- Length: 43:43
- Label: Sakara Records

Stam1na chronology
Uudet kymmenen käskyä (2006)	Raja (2008)	Viimeinen Atlantis (2010)

Raja is the third studio album by Finnish thrash metal band Stam1na. It was released in February 2008 through Sakara Records.

== Track listing ==
No.	Title	Length
1.	"Hammasratas" (Cogwheel)	4:08
2.	"Susi-Ihminen" (Wolf-Human)	3:57
3.	"Muistipalapelit" (Memory Jigsaw Puzzle)	5:34
4.	"Vartijaton" (Guardless)	5:12
5.	"Voima Vastaan Viha" (Strength Against Hatred)	3:36
6.	"Lääke" (Medicine)	4:24
7.	"Kädet Vasten Lasia" (Hands Against the Glass)	4:02
8.	"Luova Hulluus" (Creative Madness)	3:57
9.	"Muuri" (The Wall)	4:24
10.	"Murtumispiste" (Breaking Point)	4:28
Total length:		44:42

== Personnel ==
- Antti Hyyrynen – vocals, backing vocals, guitar
- Kai-Pekka Kangasmäki – bass, backing vocals
- Pekka Olkkonen – lead guitar
- Teppo Velin – drums

=== Additional musicians ===
- Jyri Kangastalo – backing vocals
- Emil Lähteenmäki – keyboards
- Sonja Nurmela – backing vocals on tracks 1 and 5
- Tuomo Saikkonen – additional vocals on track 6, backing vocals
- Tommy Tuovinen – additional vocals on track 2, backing vocals

=== Production ===
- Janne Joutsenniemi – producer, engineer
- Miitri Aaltonen – mixing
- Mika Jussila – mastering
- Ville Hyyrynen – cover, graphics
- Jouni Kallio, Marianne Heikkilä, Nina Palin – photography
- Jarkko Martikainen – assistant lyricist
