= Sotakoira =

Studio album by Kotiteollisuus
- Released: 13 August 2008
- Genre: Heavy metal
- Length: 28:29
- Label: Megamania

Kotiteollisuus chronology
Murheen Mailla 1996–2007 (2007)	Sotakoira (2008)	Ukonhauta (2009)

Sotakoira (trans. War Dog) is the ninth album by Finnish heavy metal and rock band Kotiteollisuus. The album made up of cover songs was released on 13 August 2008 and reached the No. 1 position in the Finnish Albums Chart

== Track list ==
The titles of songs are followed duration and name of original artists

1. "Karhujen talo" (The house of bears) (2:35) (Kari Peitsamo)
2. "Musti sotakoira" (Musti the war dog) (1:54) (Kollaa Kestää)
3. "Kevät" (Spring) (4:17) (Tavaramarkkinat)
4. "Vaasankin veri vapisee" (Even Vaasa's blood will tremble) (3:51) (Juice Leskinen)
5. "Pissaa ja paskaa" (Piss and shit) (0:36) (Terveet Kädet)
6. "Onnellinen perhe" (A Happy family) (3:06) (Ne Luumäet)
7. "Matti" (0:22) (CMX)
8. "Rakkauslaulu" (Love song) (2:31) (Juliet Jonesin Sydän)
9. "Rääväsuita ei haluta Suomeen" (Loudmouths are not welcome in Finland) (3:27) (Eppu Normaali)
10. "Kuolla elävänä" (To die alive) (5:47) (Mana Mana)

== Personnel ==
- Jouni Hynynen – guitar, vocals, backing vocals
- Janne Hongisto – bass guitar, backing vocals
- Jari Sinkkonen – drums, backing vocals

Guest musicians

- Mikko Karmila – guitar (tracks 1,2,3,9 and 10)
- Kaarle Viikate – lead guitar (tracks 4 and 10) - backing vocals (tracks 2, 5 and 6)
- Miitri Aaltonen – vocals (tracks 3, 4 and 6) - guitar (tracks 8 and 9)

Chart	Peak position
Finland's Official List	1
