= Homo Sapiens (album) =

Studio album by YUP
- Released: 1994
- Recorded: August 1994
- Genre: Progressive rock
- Length: 45:40
- Label: Polygram
- Producer: Mats Hulden

YUP chronology
| Toppatakkeja ja Toledon terästä (1994) | Homo Sapiens (1994) | Yövieraat (1996) |

Professional ratings
Review scores
| Source | Rating |
|---|---|
| Allmusic | 4.5/5 stars |

Homo Sapiens (1994) is an album by the Finnish rock group YUP.

== Track listing ==
All songs written by Tynkkynen unless noted otherwise. Lyrics by Martikainen unless noted otherwise.

1. "Beelsebub ei nuku koskaan" (Martikainen) - 5.25 "Beelzebub Never Sleeps"
2. "Balthasar oli naisten mies" - 4.55 "Balthasar Was A Ladies Man"
3. "Homo sapiens" (Tynkkynen, Martikainen) - 5.22
4. "Oikeusjuttu" - 3.33 "The Trial"
5. "Tänään kotona" - 4.02 "Home Today"
6. "Jumala halkaisi ihmisen kahtia" - 5.07 "God Split The Human In Two "
7. "Väärinkäsityksiä merellä" (Tiainen, Martikainen) - 5.06 "Misconceptions On The Sea"
8. "Domus perkele" (Martikainen) - 3.43
9. "Tyly puhe" (Tynkkynen, Hyyrynen, lyrics by Martikainen, A. Leikas) - 5.27 "An Unkind Speech"
10. "Alkemisti" - 3.00 "Alchemist"

== Personnel ==
Musicians

- Jarkko Martikainen – guitar, vocals
- Valtteri Tynkkynen – bass
- Jussi Hyyrynen – guitar
- Janne Mannonen – drums
- Petri Tiainen – keyboards
- Tero Kling - flute

Production

- Ville Pirinen - sleeve design
- Risto Närhi - engineer
- Juha Heininen - mixing
- Mats Hulden - producer, mixing
- Pedro Hietanen - executive producer
