= 180 astetta =

Studio album by Mokoma
- Released: October 19, 2012
- Genre: Thrash metal
- Length: 43:40
- Label: Sakara Records

Mokoma chronology
Varjopuoli (2011)	180 astetta (2012)	Yksi (EP) (2013)

180 astetta (translation: 180 degrees) is the eighth studio album by the Finnish thrash metal band Mokoma. The album was released through Sakara Records on October 19, 2012, and was produced by Miitri Aaltonen and the band itself. The album peaked at the top position of The Official Finnish Charts.

== Track listings ==
No.	Title	Length
1.	"Uusi aamu "New dawn""	3:23
2.	"Valkoista kohinaa "White noise""	4:20
3.	"Punamultaa "Falu red""	4:06
4.	"Uskalla elää "Dare to live""	3:57
5.	"Ajan hermo "Up to date" (direct translation: Nerve of time)"	2:46
6.	"Kuinka kävi näin "How did it happen""	3:28
7.	"Ihmisenpyörä "x""	3:25
8.	"Kuollut, kuolleempi, kuollein "Dead, more dead, most dead""	4:24
9.	"Virsi n:o 5 "Psalm 5""	3:19
10.	"Illan henki "Spirit of evening""	5:47
11.	"Vapaa "Free""	4:45

== Personnel ==
- Kuisma Aalto – guitar, backing vocals
- Marko Annala – vocals
- Janne Hyrkäs – drums, percussion
- Santtu Hämäläinen – bass, additional guitar
- Tuomo Saikkonen – guitar, backing vocals, percussion
