= Kotiteollisuus (album) =

Studio album by Kotiteollisuus
- Released: 2 March 2011
- Recorded: 2010
- Genre: Heavy metal, Hard rock
- Label: Megamania

Kotiteollisuus chronology
Ukonhauta (2009)	Kotiteollisuus (2011)

Kotiteollisuus is the self-titled album of the Finnish heavy metal band Kotiteollisuus, their 11th. Released on 2 March 2011, it debuted at number one on the Finnish Albums Chart.

"Soitellen sotaan" the first single from the album was prereleased on 24 January 2011.

== Track listing ==
1. Hornankattila – 07:33 (Hell's Pot)
2. Soitellen sotaan – 04:11 (Bring a Knife to a Gunfight)
3. Raskaat veet – 04:01 (Heavy Waters)
4. Sarvet itää – 04:55 (Horns Sprout)
5. Kylmä teräs – 04:44 (Cold Steel)
6. Rosebud – 04:17
7. Ei kukaan – 05:29 (Nobody)
8. Isän kädestä – 04:33 (From the Hand of the Father)
9. Pahanilmanlinnut – 03:14 (Jinxes)
10. Itken seinään päin – 04:54 (I Cry Towards the Wall)
11. Ainoa – 05:02 (Only One)
12. Taivas on auki – 08:16 (Heaven Is Open)

== Singles ==
- "Soitellen sotaan" (Released 24 January 2011)

== Chart performance ==
Chart	Peak position
Finland's Official List	1

== Personnel ==
- Jouni Hynynen – guitars, vocals, backing vocals
- Janne Hongisto – bass, backing vocals
- Jari Sinkkonen – drums, backing vocals

Guest musicians

- Ismo Alanko – cello (in "Ainoa")
- Tuomas Holopainen – keyboards ("Itken seinään päin")
- Miitri Aaltonen – vocals
- Antti Hyyrynen – backing vocals
- Janne Hynynen – vocals
- Yari Knuutinen – string arrangements of songs ("Kylmä teräs" and "Taivas on auki")
