= Tämän maailman ruhtinaan hovi =

Studio album by Mokoma
- Released: 2004
- Genre: Thrash metal
- Label: Sakara Records
- Producer: Mokoma & Janne Saksa

Mokoma chronology
Kurimus (2003)	Tämän maailman ruhtinaan hovi (2004)	Kuoleman laulukunnaat (2006)

Tämän maailman ruhtinaan hovi (2004) (transl. Court of the prince of this world) is an album by the Finnish thrash metal group Mokoma. On its year of release, it debuted 2nd on the Finnish album charts.

== Track listing ==
1. "Toista maata" - 4.31 "Other kind"
2. "Haudan takaa" - 3.21 "From beyond the grave"
3. "Hiljaisuuden julistaja" - 2.27 "Proclaimer of silence"
4. "Tämän maailman ruhtinaan hovi" - 4.16 "Court of the prince of this world"
5. "Minä elän!" - 3.35 "I live!"
6. "Kiellän itseni" - 2.56 "I deny myself"
7. "Hyinen syli" - 4.18 "A frigid lap"
8. "Vade retro, Satana!" - 2.34
9. "Sudet ihmisten vaatteissa" - 4.10 "Wolves in human clothes"
10. "Poltetun maan taktiikkaa" - 3.10 "Scorched earth tactics"
11. "Nämä kolme ovat yhtä" - 2.43 "These three are one"
12. "Uni saa tulla" - 3.24 "Sleep may come"

== Personnel ==
- Marko Annala - vocals
- Kuisma Aalto - guitar, bass guitar, backing vocals
- Tuomo Saikkonen - guitar, bass guitar, backing vocals
- Janne Hyrkäs - drums
