= Luihin ja ytimiin =

Studio album by Mokoma
- Released: 2007
- Genre: Thrash metal Death metal
- Label: Sakara Records

Mokoma chronology
Kuoleman laulukunnaat (2004)	Luihin ja ytimiin (2007)	Sydänjuuret (2010)

Luihin ja ytimiin is Mokoma's sixth album. It was released 2007. The album was released in three different versions. Besides normal digipak-edition there was limited edition, which had photographycollage made by Joonas Brandt. It also had interview about the album by vocalist Marko Annala and guitarist Tuomo Saikkonen and music video of "Nujerra ihminen".

The album was released, besides from CD, as vinyl like the three previous albums.

== Track listing ==
1. "Sinä riität" - 3.23 "You are enough"
2. "Nujerra ihminen" - 4.01 "Defeat the human"
3. "Veriveljet" - 2.55 "Blood brothers"
4. "Entistä ehompi" - 4.08 "Better than before"
5. "Kolmannen asteen kuulustelu" - 3.26 "Third degree interrogation"
6. "Sahalaita" - 2.33 "Saw-Edge"
7. "Turvaa selusta" - 3.40 "Cover my back"
8. "Sarvipää" - 3.57 "One with the horns"
9. "Marras" - 4.01 "November"
10. "Irvikuva - 3.32 "Abomination"
11. "Luo nahka luo sisus - 4.04 "Shapeshift"
12. "Ammu, hautaa ja vaikene" - 5.51 "Shoot, shovel and fall silent"

== Personnel ==
- Marko Annala - vocals
- Kuisma Aalto - guitar, backing vocals
- Tuomo Saikkonen - guitar, backing vocals
- Janne Hyrkäs - drums
- Santtu Hämäläinen – bass, guitar (on tracks ”Turvaa selusta”, ”Irvikuva” and ”Ammu, hautaa ja vaikene”)
