= Mana mana =

Mana mana may refer to:

- Mana Mana, a Finnish rock group
- Mah Nà Mah Nà (sometimes "Mana Mana" or "Mahna Mahna"), a popular song written by Piero Umiliani
