= Nocebo (album) =

Studio album by Stam1na
- Released: 8 February 2012
- Studio: Petrax Studios, Hollola, Finland
- Genre: Progressive metal; thrash metal
- Length: 43:02
- Label: Sakara
- Producer: Joe Barresi

Stam1na chronology
| Viimeinen Atlantis (2010) | Nocebo (2012) | SLK (2014) |

Nocebo is the fifth album by Finnish thrash metal band Stam1na. It was released on February 8, 2012. The album name refers to the nocebo effect. The album was composed mainly by Antti Hyyrynen and Pekka Olkkonen along with Kai-Pekka Kangasmäki, who made his composing début on their prior album called Viimeinen Atlantis, only this time composing two songs.

The lyrics were written by Hyyrynen, apart from "Tavastia palamaan!" which was by Finnish rap-artist Mariska. This was the first time Stam1na used an outside writer.

Stam1na also included a song in English, titled "Nomad", their first non-Finnish song since their early demo tapes. Their single "Valtiaan uudet vaateet" was made into a music video, directed by Tuomas Petsalo from Medialouhos.

The album cover is a picture of the tattoo that Jari Sinkkonen, the drummer of Finnish metal band Kotiteollisuus, has on his chest—presenting Stam1na's tooth logo.

== Recording ==
Nocebo was produced, recorded and mixed by American producer Joe Barresi. The album was recorded in Petrax-studio in Hollola, Finland in September, 2011 and then mixed in Barresi's JHOC-studio in Pasadena, California.

== Success ==
The album sold over 10,000 copies in Finland on the day it was released. It became the top album on Finland's official album listing of the week 7/2012.[6][7] They received their gold album on February 18, 2012, in Finnish Metal Expo- event where they also played the whole album live.[8] The album stayed in Finland's top 50 for twelve weeks.

== Track listing ==
Lyrics: Antti Hyyrynen, except for Tavastia palamaan. Arrangements: Stam1na.

1. "Pirunpaska" – "Asafoetida" (Direct translation is "Devil's Shit") 4:01 (comp. Hyyrynen)
2. "Valtiaan uudet vaateet" – "Ruler's New Demands" 3:51 (comp. Pekka Olkkonen)
3. "Tavastia palamaan!" – "Burn the Tavastia!" 2:50 (comp. Kai-Pekka Kangasmäki, lyrics by Mariska)
4. "Puolikas ihminen" – "Half a Man" 3:25 (comp. Hyyrynen)
5. "Aivohalvaus" – "Apoplexy" 4:37 (comp. Kangasmäki)
6. "Rabies" – 4:02 (comp. Hyyrynen)
7. "Lepositeet" – "Limb Restraints" 6:21 (comp. Olkkonen)
8. "Nomad" – 4:43 (comp. Hyyrynen)
9. "Ei encorea" – "No Encore" 4:32 (comp. Olkkonen)
10. "Arveton on arvoton" – "Scarless Is Worthless" 4:42 (comp. Olkkonen)

== Personnel ==
=== Stam1na ===
- Antti Hyyrynen – vocals, guitar
- Kai-Pekka Kangasmäki – bass guitar, backing vocals
- Emil Lähteenmäki – keyboards
- Pekka Olkkonen – solo guitar
- Teppo Velin – drums

=== Featuring musicians ===
- Markus Pajakkala – saxophone, bass clarinet and flute on "Pirunpaska"
- Kuisma Aalto and Tuomo Saikkonen (along with Olkkonen and Kangasmäki) – "the wolves" on "Aivohalvaus" and "Rabies"

== Charts ==
Chart performance for Nocebo
| Chart (2012) | Peak position |
|---|---|
| Finnish Albums (Suomen virallinen lista) | 1 |
