= Sydänjuuret =

Studio album by Mokoma
- Released: March 24, 2010
- Genre: Thrash metal
- Length: 43:54
- Label: Sakara Records

Mokoma chronology
Luihin ja ytimiin (2007)	Sydänjuuret (2010)	Juurta jaksain (2010)

Sydänjuuret is the seventh studio album by the Finnish thrash metal band Mokoma, that was released on March 24, 2010. It has once reached top position in the Finnish albums chart.

== Track listings ==
No.	Title	Length
1.	"Sydänjuuret "Heartstrings""	4:23
2.	"Vastavirtaan "Up the stream""	3:41
3.	"Ei kahta sanaa (ilman kolmatta) "No two words (without a third one)""	2:33
4.	"Vääräleuka "Joker""	3:29
5.	"Kristuksen ruumis ja pedon pää "Christ's body and the head of the beast""	5:33
6.	"Niin hyville kuin pahoille "For the good and the evil""	3:24
7.	"Rautaa rinnoista "Iron from the briskets""	4:07
8.	"Älä anna sille nimeä "Don't give it a name""	4:24
9.	"Kalmannäkijä "One who sees the dead""	4:43
10.	"Hei hei heinäkuu "Bye bye July""	3:54
11.	"Turhuuksien turhuus "Vanity of the vanities""	3:44

== Personnel ==
- Kuisma Aalto – guitar, backing vocals
- Marko Annala – vocals, backing vocals
- Janne Hyrkäs – drums
- Santtu Hämäläinen – bass
- Tuomo Saikkonen – guitar
