= Hynynen =

Hynynen is a Finnish surname. Notable people with the surname include:

- Antti Hynynen (born 1984), Finnish footballer
- Jouni Hynynen (born 1970), Finnish musician, author, and television host
