= Elävien kirjoihin =

Studio album by Mokoma
- Released: February 6, 2015
- Genre: Thrash metal • heavy metal • death metal
- Length: 46:42
- Label: Sakara Records

Mokoma chronology
Yksi (EP) (2013)	Elävien kirjoihin (2015)	Laulurovio (2016)

Elävien kirjoihin (translation: Into the books of the living) is the ninth studio album by the Finnish thrash metal band Mokoma. The album was released through Sakara Records on February 6, 2015, and was produced by Janne Saksa. The album peaked on the top position of The Official Finnish Charts.

== Track listings ==
No.	Title	Length
1.	"Elävien kirjoihin "Into the books of the living""	3:46
2.	"Sinne missä aamu sarastaa "To where the morning dawns""	3:46
3.	"Valtakunnassa kaikki hyvin "All is well in the empire""	3:06
4.	"Lunnaat "Ransom""	4:06
5.	"Uhkakuva 6 "Threat 6""	3:39
6.	"Vastakkaiset voimat "Opposite forces""	5:15
7.	"Irti "Loose""	4:18
8.	"Mutta minulta puuttuisi rakkaus "But I would be missing love""	3:59
9.	"Hujan hajan "Higgledy-piggledy""	5:07
10.	"Pohja on nähty "The bottom has been seen""	4:11
11.	"Nimensä unohtaneen rukous "A prayer of one who has forgotten their name""	5:29

== Personnel ==
- Kuisma Aalto – guitar, backing vocals
- Marko Annala – vocals
- Janne Hyrkäs – drums
- Santtu Hämäläinen – bass
- Tuomo Saikkonen – guitar, backing vocals
