= Nocebo (disambiguation) =

A nocebo effect is a harmful effect caused by negative belief.

Nocebo may also refer to:

- Nocebo (album), 2012 studio album by Stam1na
- Nocebo (film), 2022 psychological thriller film

== See also ==
- Placebo
