= Viimeinen Atlantis =

Studio album by Stam1na
- Released: 10 February 2010
- Genre: Progressive metal; thrash metal
- Length: 46:54
- Label: Sakara

Stam1na chronology
Raja (2008)	Viimeinen Atlantis (2010)	Nocebo (2012)

Viimeinen Atlantis (in English The Last Atlantis) is the fourth album by Finnish thrash metal band Stam1na. It was released on 10 February 2010. It features keyboardist Emil Lähteenmäki for the first time as a permanent band member.

The album's lyrics deal with climate change and consumption culture. "The album is a record from an era in which the warning signs were visible for everyone. The water level rises but the map is burning: it is time to choose a direction and start running", commented lyricist Antti Hyyrynen.

The band opened on 9 December 2009 a specific website at viimeinenatlantis.fi domain where the album story was revealed panel by panel in a comic format. In addition to a normal jewelcase CD, the album was released as a vinyl and as a book version, which includes the comic and Joonas Brandt's photo reportage of the album recording. In February 2020, 10 years after the album, novel Viimeinen Atlantis was released. It is first novel by member of the band Antti Hyyrynen.

== Track listing ==
1. "S.O.S. (Salatkaa oma sijaintinne)" – 2:04 "S.O.S. (Conceal Your Location)"
2. "Piste jolta ei ollut paluuta" – 5:06 "The Point of No Return"
3. "Pakkolasku" – 3:15 "Emergency Landing / Must-Pay Bill"
4. "Jäteputkiaivot" – 3:08 "Waste Pipe Brain"
5. "Maalla, merellä, ilmassa" – 4:15 "On Land, At Sea, In Air"
6. "Elämän tarkoitus" – 4:10 "The Meaning of Life"
7. "Viestintuoja" – 3:54 "The Messenger"
8. "Rikkipää" – 4:20 "Sulfur Head"
9. "Tsunami" – 5:31
10. "Eloonjäänyt" – 5:55 "The Survivor"
11. "Viimeinen Atlantis" – 5:21 "The Last Atlantis"

== Personnel ==
- Antti Hyyrynen – vocals, guitar
- Kai-Pekka Kangasmäki – bass guitar, vocals
- Emil Lähteenmäki – keyboards
- Pekka Olkkonen – lead guitar
- Teppo Velin – drums, percussion

=== Additional musicians ===
- Timo Mäkynen – voice on track 1
- Sonja Nurmela – backing vocals
- Antti Junttila – backing vocals
- Perttu Kivilaakso – cello on track 10

== Charts ==
Chart performance for Viimeinen Atlantis
Chart (2010)	Peak position
Finnish Albums (Suomen virallinen lista)	1
