= Hengen pitimet =

Studio album by Mokoma
- Released: May 25, 2018
- Studio: Sound Supreme Studio, Hämeenlinna
- Genre: Thrash metal
- Length: 42:24
- Label: Sakara Records

Mokoma chronology
Laulurovio (2016)	Hengen pitimet (2018)	Ihmissokkelo (2020)

Hengen pitimet (translation: Spirit holders) is the tenth studio album by the Finnish thrash metal band Mokoma. The album was released through Sakara Records on May 25, 2018, and was produced by Janne Saksa. The album peaked on the top position of the Official Finnish Charts.

== Track listing ==
No.	Title	Length
1.	"Tienraivaaja "Trailblazer""	3:47
2.	"Kepeät mullat "Airy soils""	4:28
3.	"Salaisuus "Secret""	3:31
4.	"Hirtehinen "Gallows humor""	4:45
5.	"Linnut eivät enää laula "The birds no longer sing""	3:38
6.	"Lahja "Gift""	4:01
7.	"Kesytä perkeleet "Tame the evil spirits""	4:21
8.	"Tahdon ihmeet takaisin "I want miracles back""	3:42
9.	"Erhe "Lapse""	4:26
10.	"Pienin kaikista "Smallest of all""	5:53

== Personnel ==
- Kuisma Aalto – guitar, backing vocals
- Marko Annala – vocals
- Janne Hyrkäs – drums
- Santtu Hämäläinen – bass
- Tuomo Saikkonen – guitar
