= Toppatakkeja ja Toledon terästä =

Studio album by YUP
- Released: January 1994
- Recorded: August – October 1993
- Genre: Progressive metal
- Length: 44:21
- Label: Elmerecords
- Producer: YUP, J. Viitanen

YUP chronology
Huuda harkiten (1991)	Toppatakkeja ja Toledon terästä (1994)	Homo Sapiens (1994)

Professional ratings
Review scores
Source	Rating
Allmusic	4.5/5 stars

Toppatakkeja ja Toledon terästä (1994) is a concept album by the Finnish rock group YUP. It is considered as one of the band's more progressive efforts, combining many genres of music.

== Track listing ==
All songs written by Tynkkynen & Martikainen, with lyrics by Martikainen.

1. "Tyttö jota rakastan" – 3:18 "The Girl I Love"
2. "Minä olen myyrä" – 4:45 "I Am A Mole"
3. "Huonot uutiset" – 3:04 "The Bad News"
4. "Älä astu kauppiaan päälle" – 5:30 "Don't Step On The Merchant"
5. "Pää puhuu" – 2:52 "The Head Speaks"
6. "Toppatakkeja ja Toledon terästä" – 5:16 "Guilted Jackets and Steel Of Toledo"
7. "Mitä elämän jälkeen?" – 4:39 "What's After Life?"
8. "Soljan käsittely" – 4:03 "Handling of Solja"
9. "Kuonamagneetti" – 3:39 "Drossmagnet"
10. "Taivaiden maisterit" – 7:15 "Masters of the Heavens"

== Personnel ==
Musicians

- Jussi Hyyrynen - guitars, vocals
- Tommi Kärkkäinen - keyboards, percussions, vocals
- Janne Mannonen - drums, vocals
- Jarkko Martikainen - vocals, guitars, illustrations
- Valtteri Tynkkynen - bass guitar, vocals
- Granito Choir, P. Tynkkynen - vocals (6)
- V. Hyrskykari - saxophone (9)
- H. Kärkkäinen - vocals (3)
- A. Toikka - additional percussions (1, 6)
- T. Wilska - accommodations, vocals (8)

Production

- J. Viitanen - producer, engineer, mixing, mastering
- M. Jussila - mastering
