= Taival =

Studio album by Stam1na
- Released: 12 October 2018
- Studio: SF Sound, Lehmo
- Genre: Progressive metal; thrash metal
- Length: 40:59
- Label: Sakara
- Producer: Janne Joutsenniemi

Stam1na chronology
Elokuutio (2016)	Taival (2018)	Novus Ordo Mundi (2021)

Taival (translation: Journey) is the eighth studio album by Finnish band Stam1na, released on 12 October 2018. Just like with the previous album, it was produced by Janne Joutsenniemi and mixed by Jens Bogren. It debuted at number one on The Official Finnish Charts.

Stam1na promoted the album with a tour of Finland, called the Haloo Lemi tour, from October to December 2018.

== Background ==
On 5 September 2018, the band published the track listing and shared the cover art. Before releasing the album, they released three singles: "Elämänlanka" on 16 May 2018, "Enkelinmurskain" on 7 September, and "Gaian lapsi" on 11 October. The band's lyricist Antti Hyyrynen described the album as "wander[ing] through the big topics of a human's life" and speaking "of the unachievable nature of life".

== Track listing ==
1. "Hyvää yötä" – "Good Night" (Antti Hyyrynen) - 2:31
2. "Solar" (Pekka Olkkonen) – 3:55
3. "Elämänlanka" - "Lifeline" (Hyyrynen) – 3:30
4. "Enkelinmurskain" - "Angel Crusher" (Olkkonen) – 4:12
5. "Gaian lapsi" - "Gaia's Child" (featuring Anna Eriksson) (Hyyrynen) – 3:20
6. "Metsästäjä I: Metsästäjä" - "Hunter I: Hunter" (Olkkonen) – 2:59
7. "Metsästäjä II: Ero" - "Hunter II: Separation" (Olkkonen) – 2:27
8. "Metsästäjä II: Ylösalainen" - "Hunter III: Upside Down" (Olkkonen) – 2:34
9. "Sudet tulevat" - "The Wolves Are Coming" (featuring Björgvin Sigurðsson) (Kai-Pekka Kangasmäki) – 3:19
10. "Merivälimatka" - "Sea Voyage" (a play-on-words; "Välimeri" refers to the Mediterranean Sea) (Hyyrynen) – 5:00
11. "Kannoin sinut läpi hiljaisen huoneen" - "I Carried You Through a Silent Room" (Olkkonen) – 3:53
12. "Kajo" - "Shimmer" (Emil Lähteenmäki) – 3:19

== Personnel ==
=== Stam1na ===
- Antti Hyyrynen – vocals, guitar
- Kai-Pekka Kangasmäki – bass guitar, secondary vocals
- Emil Lähteenmäki – keyboard
- Pekka Olkkonen – guitar
- Teppo Velin – drums

=== Guest musicians ===
- Anna Eriksson – vocals on "Gaian lapsi"
- Björgvin Sigurðsson (Skálmöld) – vocals on "Sudet tulevat"
- Eetu Klemetti – kampiliira on "Kajo"
- Janne Joutsenniemi – secondary vocals on "Merivälimatka"
- Zaani, Arttu Leppänen, Joonas Kaselius & Lauri Mäntynen (Nerve End) – background vocals

== Charts ==
Chart performance for Taival
Chart (2018)	Peak position
Finnish Albums (Suomen virallinen lista)	1
