= SLK (album) =

Studio album by Stam1na
- Released: 7 February 2014
- Studios: Sound Supreme Studio, Hämeenlinna
- Genres: Progressive metal; heavy metal; thrash metal
- Length: 44:25
- Label: Sakara
- Producer: Janne Saksa

Stam1na chronology
Nocebo (2012)	SLK (2014)	Elokuutio (2016)

Professional ratings
Review scores
Source	Rating
Powermetal.de	7.5/10
Reflections of Darkness	8.75/10

SLK (abbreviation for "Salli luonnollinen kuolema", translation: Allow a Natural Death) is the sixth studio album by Finnish band Stam1na. The album was released on 7 February 2014 through Sakara Records and produced by Janne Saksa. The album peaked at the top position of the Official Finnish Charts. A music video was released for the track "Panzerfaust".

== Track listing ==
1. "Rautasorkka" – "Iron Hoof" (Antti Hyyrynen) - 4:23
2. "Kalmankansa" – "The People of Death" (Kai-Pekka Kangasmäki) - 4:29
3. "Panzerfaust" – (Kangasmäki) - 3:59
4. "Kuoliaaksi ruoskitut hevoset" – "Horses Whipped to Death" (Pekka Olkkonen) - 3:46
5. "Masiina" – "Machine" (Olkkonen) - 5:15
6. "Heikko ehkä" – "Weak Maybe" (Kangasmäki) - 3:21
7. "Dynamo" – (Hyyrynen) - 3:47
8. "Kylmä kuuma kylmä" – "Cold Hot Cold" (Hyyrynen) - 3:51
9. "Usko pois" – "Believe it or not / Faith Away" (Olkkonen) - 3:28
10. "Kolmen minuutin hiljaisuus" – "Three Minute Silence" (Kangasmäki, Hyyrynen) - 2:48
11. "SLK" – "Allow a Natural Death" (Olkkonen, Hyyrynen) - 5:18

== Personnel ==
=== Stam1na ===
- Antti Hyyrynen – vocals, guitar
- Kai-Pekka Kangasmäki – bass guitar
- Emil Lähteenmäki – keyboard
- Pekka Olkkonen – guitar
- Teppo Velin – drums

=== Guest musicians ===
- Spellgoth - vocals on "Panzerfaust" and "Kylmä kuuma kylmä"
- Esa Pulliainen - guitar on "Kolmen minuutin hiljaisuus"
- Tuomo Saikkonen - vocals on "Panzerfaust," "Kylmä kuuma kylmä" and "SLK"
- Saikkonen, Kuisma Aalto, Vauhkonen, Spellgoth, Hyyrynen, Kangasmäki and Olkkonen - backing vocals on "Panzerfaust" and "Heikko ehkä"

== Charts ==
Chart performance for SLK
Chart (2014)	Peak position
Finnish Albums (Suomen virallinen lista)	1
