= Elokuutio =

Studio album by Stam1na
- Released: 18 March 2016
- Genre: Progressive metal; thrash metal
- Length: 47:52
- Label: Sakara

Stam1na chronology
SLK (2014)	Elokuutio (2016)	Taival (2018)

Elokuutio is the seventh studio album by Finnish progressive metal band Stam1na. It was produced by Janne Joutsenniemi and mixed by Jens Bogren. The album's title Elokuutio can mean eloquence, but can also be translated as "living cube". Lyricist Antti Hyyrynen describes the album's theme as the "digital hell of the unreligious".

On 8 January 2016, the track listing and cover art of the album was revealed. On 19 February, the first single from the album, "Kuudet raamit", was released, and a week later a 360 music video directed by Tuomas Petsalo was released.

== Track listing ==
1. "Ikoneklasmia" – "Iconoclasm/iGadgetclasm" – 6:23
2. "Elokuutio" – "Eloquence/Living Cube" – 4:07
3. "Meidänkaltaisillemme" – "To Our Kind/Like Us" – 3:29
4. "Pala palalta" – "Piece by Piece" – 4:44
5. "Pienet vihreät miehet" – "Little Green Men" – 3:46
6. "Mätä hohtava omena" – "Rotten Glowing Apple" – 4:10
7. "D.S.M." – "Deus Sex Machina" – 4:37
8. "Marttyyri" – "Martyr" – 6:27
9. "Kuudet raamit" – "Six Frames" – 3:32
10. "Valhe" – "Lie" – 6:37

== Personnel ==
=== Stam1na ===
- Antti Hyyrynen – vocals, guitar
- Kai-Pekka Kangasmäki – bass guitar, backing vocals
- Emil Lähteenmäki – keyboards
- Pekka Olkkonen – lead guitar
- Teppo Velin – drums

=== Guest musicians ===
- Tomi Joutsen – vocals on "Meidänkaltaisillemme"
- Kalle Lindberg – vocals on "D.S.M."
- Tuomo Saikkonen – backing vocals on "Meidänkaltaisillemme" and "Marttyyri"
- Janne Joutsenniemi – backing vocals on "Marttyyri" and "Kuudet raamit"

== Charts ==
Chart performance for Elokuutio
Chart (2016)	Peak position
Finnish Albums (Suomen virallinen lista)	1
