= Kurimus =

Studio album by Mokoma
- Released: 2003
- Genre: Thrash metal
- Label: Sakara
- Producer: Mokoma; Janne Saksa

Mokoma chronology
Mokoman 120 päivää (2001)	Kurimus (2003)	Tämän maailman ruhtinaan hovi (2004)

Kurimus is an album by the Finnish thrash metal group Mokoma, released in 2003. In its year of release, it reached number 31 on the Finnish albums chart; it re-entered in 2022 and reached number 29.

The album was chosen as one of the best Finnish albums of the 21st century by Finnish music magazine Soundi.

== Track listing ==
1. "Mene ja tiedä" – 2:52 ("Go and know")
2. "Takatalvi" – 2:34 ("Cold spell in spring")
3. "Kasvot kohti itää" – 4:17 ("Face towards the east")
4. "Tämä puoli" – 4:55 ("This side")
5. "Houkka" – 2:13 ("Fool")
6. "Vainottu" – 2:38 ("The persecuted")
7. "Silmäterä" – 4:21 ("Apple of my eye")
8. "Punainen kukko" – 3:20 ("The red rooster")
9. "Lupaus" – 3:37 ("Promise")
10. "Väsynyt Atlas" – 5:48 ("Tired/Fatigued Atlas")
11. "Liiton loppu" – 7:07 ("End of the covenant")

== Personnel ==
- Marko Annala – vocals
- Kuisma Aalto – guitar, backing vocals
- Tuomo Saikkonen – guitar, backing vocals
- Janne Hyrkäs – drums
- Heikki Kärkkäinen – bass guitar

== Charts ==
Chart performance for Kurimus
Chart (2003; 2022)	Peak position
Belgian Albums (Ultratop Flanders)	3
