= Kuoleman laulukunnaat =

Studio album by Mokoma
- Released: 2006
- Genre: Thrash metal
- Label: Sakara Records

Mokoma chronology
Tämän maailman ruhtinaan hovi (2004)	Kuoleman laulukunnaat (2006)	Luihin ja ytimiin (2007)

Kuoleman laulukunnaat is Mokoma's fifth album, which was released in 2006. It is a concept album about an ended relationship.

== Track listing ==
1. "Valapatto" – 2:59 "Perjurer"
2. "Ärräpää" – 3:49 "F-word"
3. "Kuu saa valtansa auringolta" – 4:19 "Sun yields might to the moon"
4. "Pahaa verta" – 3:07 "Bad blood"
5. "Mieli sydäntä syyttää" – 3:26 "Mind accuses the heart"
6. "Täyttä ymmärrystä vailla" – 3:04 "Non compos mentis"
7. "Tulkki" – 3:35 "Interpreter"
8. "Itken silmät päästäni" – 5:38 "I cry my eyes out"
9. "Tästä on hyvä jatkaa" – 3:26 "I´ll carry on from here"
10. "Säästä sanasi" – 3:41 "Spare your words"
11. "Lujaa tekoa" – 3:36 "Made to last"

== Personnel ==
- Marko Annala - vocals
- Kuisma Aalto - guitar, backing vocals
- Tuomo Saikkonen - guitar, backing vocals
- Janne Hyrkäs - drums
- Santtu Hämäläinen – bass
