= Stam1na (album) =

Studio album by Stam1na
- Released: 2 March 2005
- Genre: Thrash metal
- Length: 39:10
- Label: Sakara Records

Stam1na chronology
Stam1na (2005)	Uudet kymmenen käskyä (2006)

Stam1na is the self-titled debut album by Finnish thrash metal band Stam1na. It was released on 2 March 2005, and reached #13 on the official Finnish album charts.

== Track listing ==
1. "Ristiriita" (3:28) "Contradiction" or "Discrepancy". Also means a fight about (christian) cross.
2. "Sananen lihasta" (3:38) "A Word About Flesh"
3. "Kadonneet kolme sanaa" (3:42) "The Three Lost Words"
4. "Väkivaltakunta" (3:06) "The Kingdom of Violence" (a play on words, combining "väkivalta" – violence – and "valtakunta" – kingdom)
5. "Erilaisen rakkauden todistaja" (3:20) "Witness of a Different Love"
6. "Koe murha!" (2:45) "Experience Murder!"
7. "Tuomittu, syyllinen" (3:46) "Condemned, Guilty"
8. "Peto rakasti sinua" (3:29) "The Beast Loved You"
9. "Koirapoika" (3:48) "Dogboy"
10. "Kaikki kääntyy vielä parhain päin" (4:08) "Everything's Going to Turn Better"
11. "Paha arkkitehti" (4:00) "The Evil Architect"

== Singles ==
- Kadonneet kolme sanaa (2005)
- Paha arkkitehti (2005)

== Personnel ==
- Antti Hyyrynen – vocals, guitar, bass
- Pekka Olkkonen – lead guitar
- Teppo Velin – drums

=== Additional musicians ===
- Miitri Aaltonen – backing vocals on tracks 8 and 9
- Kaisu Kärri – female vocals on track 2

=== Production ===
- Miitri Aaltonen – producer, engineer, mixing
- Tiina Röyskö – assistant engineer
- Mika Jussila – mastering
- Ville Hyyrynen – artwork
