= Ihmissokkelo =

Studio album by Mokoma
- Released: February 21, 2020
- Studio: Sound Supreme Studio, Hämeenlinna
- Genre: Thrash metal
- Length: 41:17
- Label: Sakara Records

Mokoma chronology
Hengen pitimet (2018)	Ihmissokkelo (2020)

Ihmissokkelo (translation: Human maze) is the eleventh studio album by the Finnish thrash metal band Mokoma. The album was released through Sakara Records on February 21, 2020, and was produced by Janne Saksa and mixed by Jens Borgen. The album peaked on the top position of the Official Finnish Charts.

== Track listing ==
No.	Title	Length
1.	"Alkupiste "Starting point""	0:46
2.	"Ilmoitusluontoista asiaa "Notification matter""	3:32
3.	"Vuoret, huolet "Mountains, worries""	3:04
4.	"Ihmissokkelo "Human maze""	4:24
5.	"Tuhat ei riitä "A thousand is not enough""	4:00
6.	"Toinen ihminen "Another human""	3:52
7.	"Pimeä aine "Dark matter""	4:20
8.	"Yöpuoli "Nightside""	4:22
9.	"Leikin loppu "A play's end""	4:10
10.	"Jäljet "Traces""	4:13
11.	"Syyttävä sormi "Accusing finger""	3:18
12.	"Huomenna voikin olla niin "Tomorrow may be so""	5:28

== Personnel ==
- Kuisma Aalto – guitar, backing vocals
- Marko Annala – vocals
- Janne Hyrkäs – drums
- Santtu Hämäläinen – bass
- Tuomo Saikkonen – guitar, backing vocals
