= Renaissance (Diablo album) =

Studio album by Diablo
- Released: 2002
- Genre: Melodic death metal, groove metal
- Length: 40:24
- Label: Poko Rekords

Diablo chronology
Elegance in Black (2000)	Renaissance (2002)	Eternium (2004)

Renaissance is the second studio album by Finnish melodic death metal band Diablo. It debuted at #14 on the Finnish albums chart.

== Track listing ==
1. "Angel" – 4:22
2. "Icon of Flesh" – 4:24
3. "Tunnel of Pain" – 4:27
4. "C22" – 3:49
5. "Creatures of Deception" – 3:59
6. "Hollow Point" – 4:30
7. "Intomesee" – 3:48
8. "Enemy" – 3:48
9. "A Fear" – 4:00
10. "Renaissance" – 4:08

== Personnel ==
- Rainer Nygård – vocals, guitar
- Marko Utriainen – guitar
- Aadolf Virtanen – bass
- Heikki Malmberg – drums
