= Stam1na =

Finnish metal band

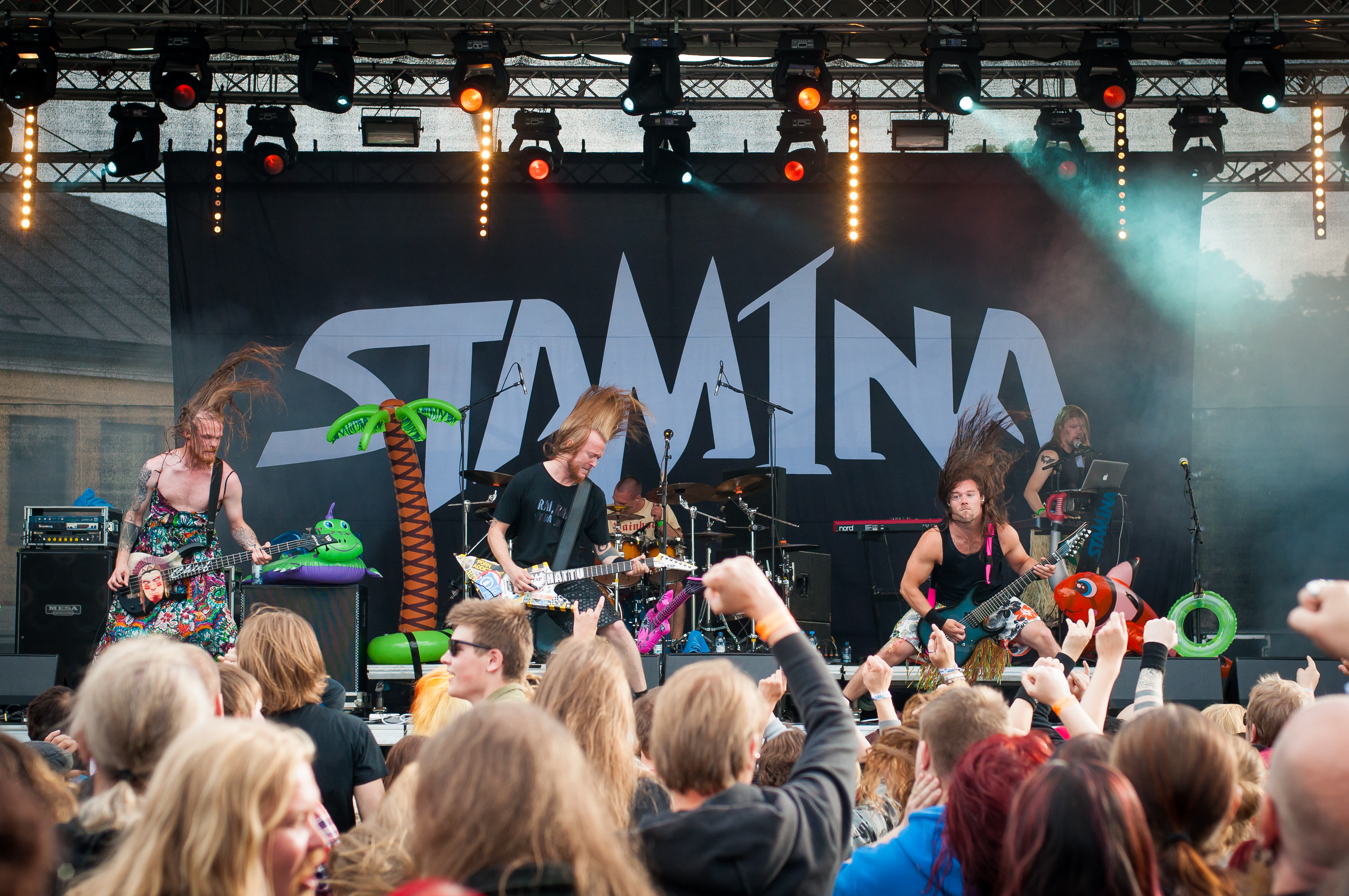
- Stam1na performing at 2013 Rakuunarock festival in Lappeenranta, Finland.

Background information
- Origin: Lemi, Finland
- Genres: Progressive metal, thrash metal
- Years active: 1996–present
- Label: Sakara
- Members: Antti Hyyrynen; Kai-Pekka Kangasmäki; Pekka Olkkonen; Teppo Velin; Emil Lähteenmäki
- Website: www.stam1na.com

Stam1na (pronounced [ˈstɑminɑ]) is a Finnish metal band from Lemi, South Karelia. They play thrash metal with progressive metal, death, alternative and punk influences, and write lyrics in Finnish. The band uses seven-string guitars on all albums except the first one where they used six-strings. A few songs were composed for eight-string guitar on the eighth album, Taival.

== Name ==
The band use the number "1" instead of the letter "I" in their name to distinguish themselves and make the band easier to find in search engines.

== Background ==
The band started as a three-piece in 1996. After several demos, they signed, late in 2004, to Sakara Records, founded and headed by South Karelian band Mokoma.

The founding trio are Antti Hyyrynen on vocals and guitar, Pekka Olkkonen on lead guitar and Teppo Velin on drums. Bassist Kai-Pekka Kangasmäki joined in 2005, and keyboardist Emil Lähteenmäki in 2009.

Stam1na's self-titled debut album, released in March 2005, reached No. 13 on the Finnish album charts. Their second album, Uudet kymmenen käskyä, was released on 10 May 2006 and did even better on the charts, reaching No. 3 on its first week.

Claiming critical acclaim by heavy touring and winning several awards in Finland, and making their debut in Germany by touring with Apocalyptica in the autumn of 2007, they proceeded to release their third album Raja in February 2008, which went straight to No. 1 on the Finnish album chart in the first week. 10 February 2010, Stam1na released their fourth album titled Viimeinen Atlantis, which translates as "The Last Atlantis", which also went straight to first place on the Finnish album chart, topping among others HIM's new release, and was certified gold by ÄKT in its first week of sales.

In 2012 Stam1na released their fifth album entitled Nocebo, produced by Joe Barresi. Nocebo topped the Finnish album chart and was certified gold on the day of its release. Their sixth album, SLK, was released in February 2014. Stam1na made a historical series of performances in summer 2015 by playing the Provinssirock festival on four consecutive days, playing a different album from their discography in its entirety on each day.

Their seventh studio album Elokuutio was released on 16 March 2016. Since then, they have been gradually touring outside of Finland, appearing on the 70,000 Tons of Metal cruise in 2017 and as part of the "Arctic Circle Alliance" with Skálmöld and Omnium Gatherum (2017-2018).

Stam1na released their eighth studio album Taival in 2018.

== Band members ==
Stam1na live at Rockharz 2019

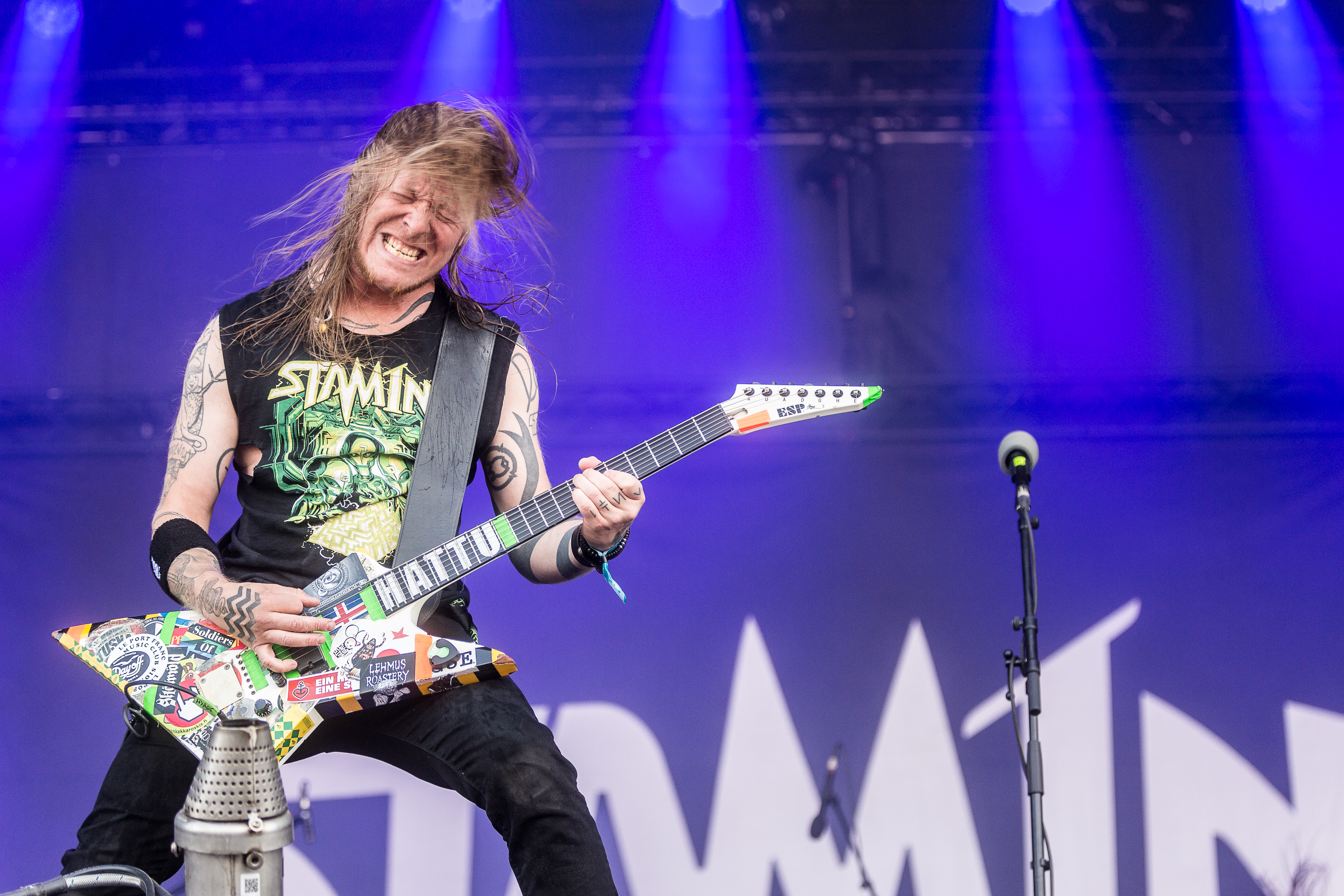
Antti "Hyrde" Hyyrynen
vocals, guitar (1996–)

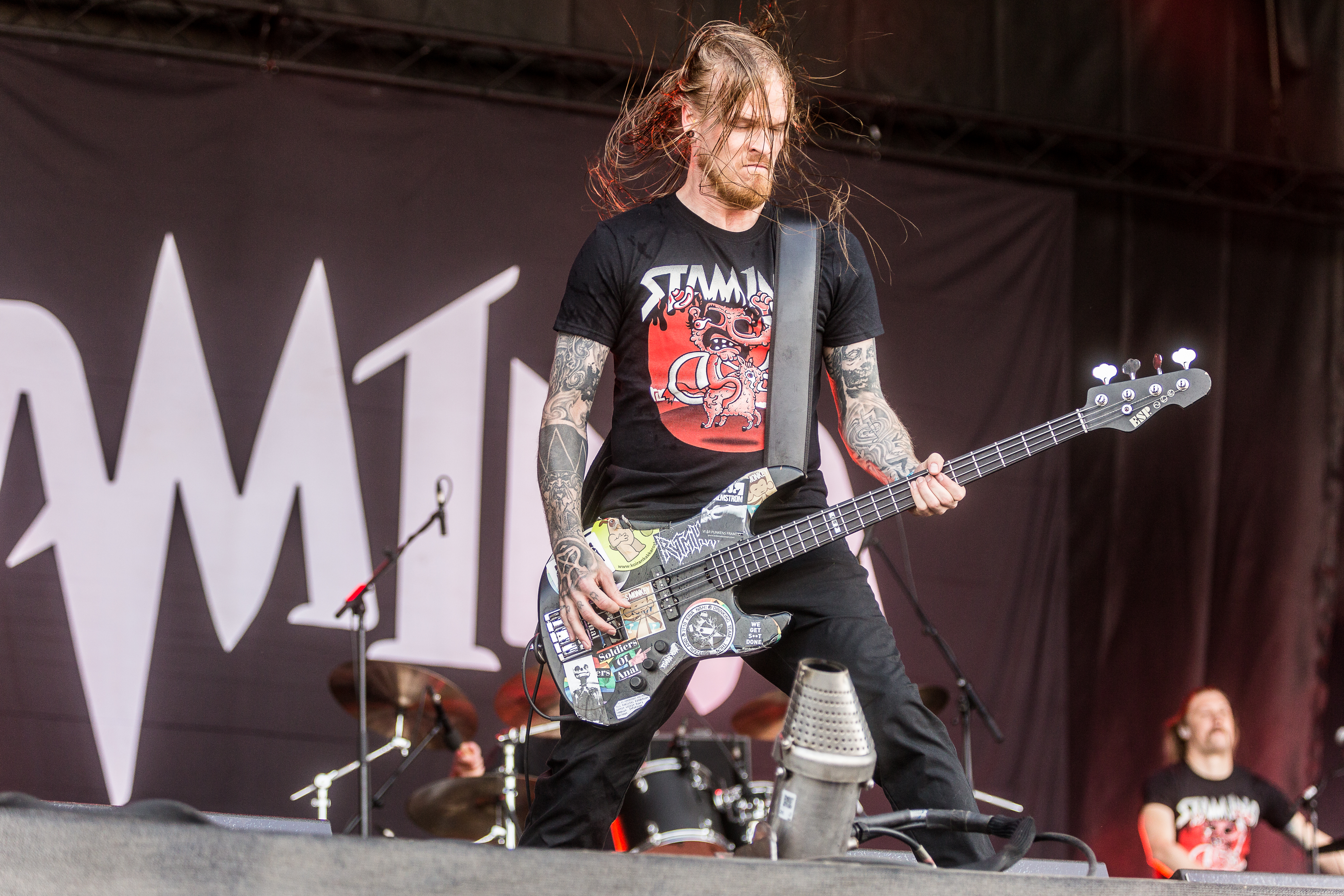
Kai-Pekka "Kaikka" Kangasmäki
bass (2005–)

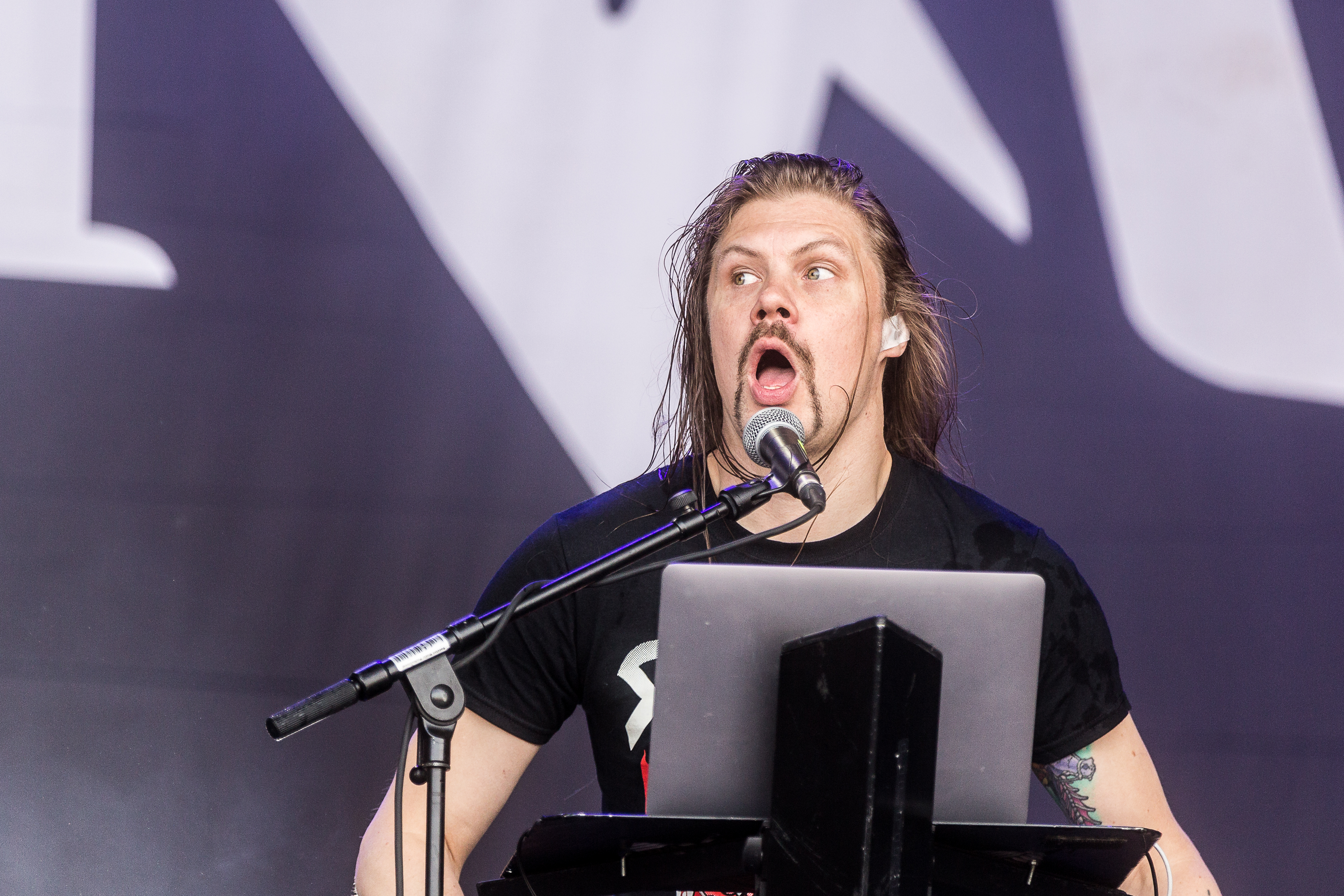
Emil "Hippi" Lähteenmäki
keyboards (2009–)

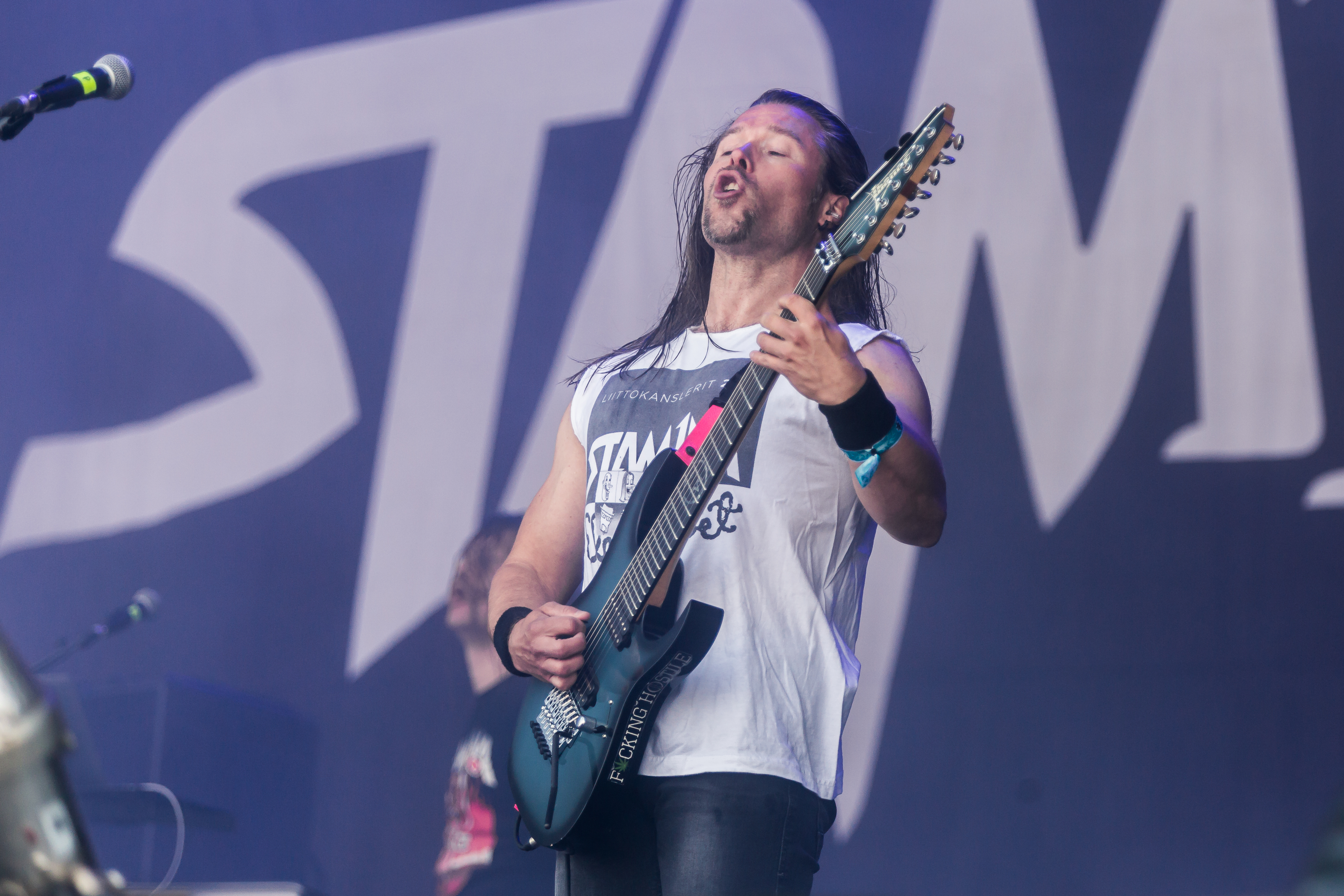
Pekka "Pexi" Olkkonen
lead guitar (1996–)

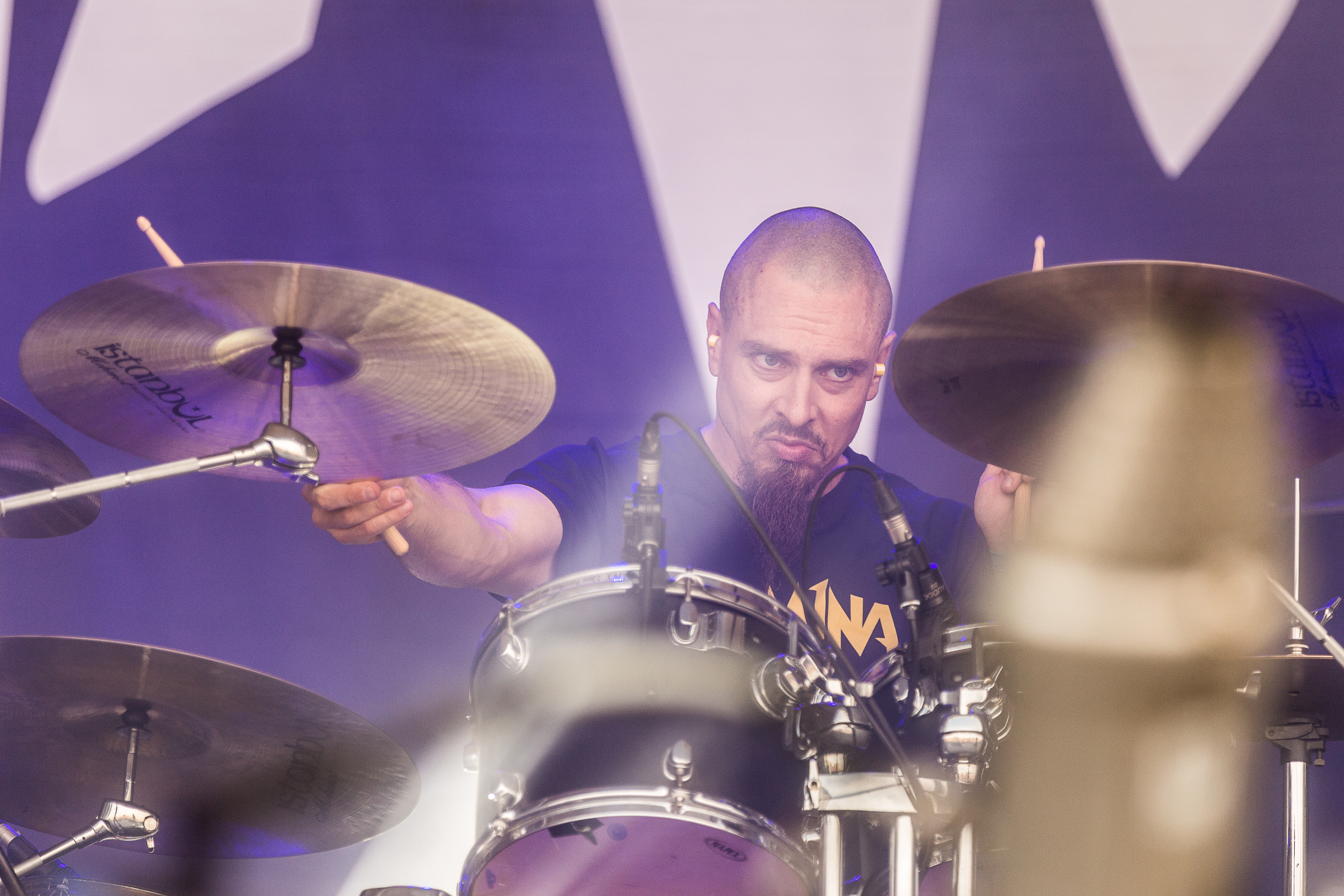
Teppo "Kake" Velin
drums (1996–)

== Discography ==
=== Albums ===
Year	Album	Translation of title	Peak positions	Certification
Year	Album	Translation of title	FIN	Certification
2005	Stam1na		13	
2006	Uudet kymmenen käskyä	The New 10 Commandments	3	
2008	Raja	Limit or Border	1	
2010	Viimeinen Atlantis	The Last Atlantis	1	
2012	Nocebo	A reference to the Nocebo effect	1	
2014	SLK	SLK =Salli Luonnollinen Kuolema (translated literally as "Allow Natural Death")	1	
2016	Elokuutio	Eloquence or Living Cube	1	
2018	Taival	Journey	1	
2020	VA10 (Viimeinen Atlantis 10th Anniversary Remastered)		13	
2021	Novus Ordo Mundi	New world order (in Latin language)	1	
2023	X		1	
2026	Apnea		2	

Compilation albums

Year	Album	Translation of title	Peak positions	Certification
Year	Album	Translation of title	FIN	Certification
2010	Vanhaa paskaa	Some old shit	2	

=== Singles ===
Year	Single	Translation of title	Peak positions	Album
Year	Single	Translation of title	FIN	Album
2005	"Kadonneet kolme sanaa"	The Three Lost Words	17	Stam1na
2005	"Paha arkkitehti"	An Evil Architect	4	Stam1na
2006	"Edessäni"	In Front of Me	–	Uudet kymmenen käskyä
2006	"Likainen parketti"	Dirty Parquet	1	Uudet kymmenen käskyä
2008	"Lääke"	Medicine	–	Raja
2010	"Pakkolasku"	Forced Landing/ A Mandatory Bill (pun)	–	Viimeinen Atlantis
2012	"Valtiaan uudet vaateet"	Ruler's New Demands	17	Nocebo
2012	"Puolikas ihminen"	Half a Man	–	Nocebo
2014	"Panzerfaust"	Iron Fist	–	SLK
2014	"Dynamo"		–	SLK
2014	"Vapaa on sana"	Free Is a Word	–	–
2016	"Kuudet raamit"	Six Frames	–	Elokuutio
2016	"Verisateenkaari"	Blood Rainbow	–	–
2018	"Elämänlanka"	Life's Thread	–	Taival
2018	"Enkelinmurskain"	Angel Crusher	–	Taival
2018	"Gaian lapsi" (feat. Anna Eriksson)	Child of Gaia	–	Taival
2021	"Sirkkeli"	Circular Saw	–	Novus Ordo Mundi
2021	"Betelgeuse"		–	Novus Ordo Mundi
2023	"Vereen piirretty viiva"	A Line Drawn in Blood	–	X
2023	"Muistipalatsi"	Memory Palace	–	X
2025	"Golem"		–	Apnea
2026	"Käärmeennyrkki"	Snake's Fist	–	Apnea

Joint singles Mokoma / Rytmihäiriö / Stam1na

- 2007: Sakara Tour 2006 Nosturi (FIN #7)
- 2007: Sakara Tour 2006 Työnkulma (FIN #8)
- 2007: Sakara Tour 2006 Rytmikorjaamo (FIN #9)
- 2007: Sakara Tour 2006 Tivoli (FIN #11)
- 2007: Sakara Tour 2006 Teatria (FIN #12)
- 2007: Sakara Tour 2006 Lutakko (FIN #14)
- 2007: Sakara Tour 2006 Sibeliustalo (FIN #16)

=== Music videos ===
- Erilaisen rakkauden todistaja (Witness of a Different Kind of Love) (2003)
- Kadonneet kolme sanaa (The Lost Three Words) (2005)
- Ristiriita (Conflict/Cross Argument) (2005)
- Paha arkkitehti (An Evil Architect) (2005)
- Edessäni (In Front of Me) (2006)
- Likainen parketti (Dirty Parquet) (2006)
- Lääke (Medicine) (2008)
- Muistipalapelit (Memorypuzzles) (2008)
- Pakkolasku (Emergency landing/A Must-pay Bill) (2010)
- Rikkipää (Sulfur Head / Brokenhead) (2010)
- Yhdeksän tien päät (The Ends of Nine Roads) (2010)
- Valtiaan uudet vaateet (Ruler's New Demands) (2012)
- Puolikas ihminen (Half a Man) (2012)
- Panzerfaust (Iron Fist) (2014)
- Kuoliaaksi ruoskitut hevoset (Flogging Dead Horses) (2014)
- Vapaa on sana (Free Is a Word) (2014)
- Kuudet raamit (Six Frames) (2016)
- Elokuutio (Eloquence/The Living Cube) (2016)
- Enkelinmurskain (Angelcrusher) (2018)
- Kannoin sinut läpi hiljaisen huoneen (I Carried You Through a Silent Room) (2020)
- Memento Mori (ateistin kiitos) (parentheses: an atheist's commendation) (2021)
- Metropolio (2023)
- Vereen piirretty viiva (A Line Drawn in Blood) (2023)
- Muistipalatsi (Memory Palace) (2023)

=== DVDs ===
- Sakara Tour 2006 (2007)
- K13V (2009)
