= Icaros (album) =

Studio album by Diablo
- Released: 14 May 2008
- Recorded: 2008
- Genre: Melodic death metal, thrash metal, groove metal
- Length: 44:54
- Label: Sakara Records

Diablo chronology
Mimic47 (2006)	Icaros (2008)

Professional ratings
Review scores
Source	Rating
Terrorizer	(Dec 2008)

Icaros is the fifth studio album by Finnish melodic death metal band Diablo. It was released on May 14, 2008, via Sakara Records.

== Track listing ==
No.	Title	Length
1.	"Trail of Kings"	4:54
2.	"Living Dead Superstars"	4:19
3.	"Bad Sign"	3:34
4.	"Resign from Life"	4:38
5.	"Icaros"	3:38
6.	"Light of the End"	4:46
7.	"Chagrin"	4:06
8.	"Through Difficulties to Defeat"	3:37
9.	"Hammer"	3:18
10.	"Into the Sea"	8:04
Total length:		44:54

== Personnel ==
- Rainer Nygård – vocals, guitar
- Marko Utriainen – guitar
- Aadolf Virtanen – bass
- Heikki Malmberg – drums
