= YUP (band) =

Finnish rock band

- Origin: Finland
- Genres: Progressive rock Rock; Pop rock hardcore punk (early)
- Years active: 1987–2009
- Members: Jarkko Martikainen; Valtteri Tynkkynen; Jussi Hyyrynen; Janne Mannonen; Petri Tiainen
- Past members: Tommi Kärkkäinen

YUP (Yhdistyneet Urbaanit Puoskarit, literal translation United Urban Quacks, originally Y.U.P. Young Urban Perverts) is a Finnish rock-music group. The band arose amongst three students of the Savonlinna senior high of arts in 1987 and played some rather primitive, progressive hard-core punk with English lyrics. Originally the group consisted of Jarkko Martikainen (guitar), Valtteri Tynkkynen (bass guitar) and Jussi Hyyrynen (drums).

With the EP Turpasauna in 1990 the language changed into Finnish and the music became more complicated. Soon a fourth member joined the band, keyboardist Tommi Kärkkäinen, since more musicians were needed to carry out the varied ideas of the artists. In 1992 on the single Daavidin fuzz / Paratiisin sahakielet the crew had changed again: Jussi Hyyrynen had switched to the guitar and Janne Mannonen had been hired to be the new drummer. The current form of YUP dates back to 1994 when the keyboardist was changed to Petri Tiainen after the album Toppatakkeja ja Toledon terästä. Tommi Kärkkäinen begun to compose classical music.

The album Outo elämä from 1998 is widely considered the breakthrough of YUP. After that the music has become somewhat lighter and easier to approach, which has upset some hard-core fans. Their compilation album reflects this trend, the album being called Helppoa kuunneltavaa 2004 ("Easy Listening"), accompanied by the DVD Helppoa katseltavaa ("Easy Watching") and the songbooks Helppoa soiteltavaa ("Easy Playing") and Helppoa soiteltavaa II ("Easy Playing II").

The band's eleventh studio album, Vapauden kaupungit, was released June 21, 2008. In 2009, the band announced that it would go on an indefinite hiatus.

== Lineup ==
- Jarkko Martikainen - vocals, guitar
- Valtteri Tynkkynen - bass guitar
- Jussi Hyyrynen - guitar
- Janne Mannonen - drums
- Petri Tiainen - keyboards

== Discography ==
=== Albums ===
- The Hippos From Hell (1989)
- Huuda harkiten (Shout Thoughtfully) (1991)
- Toppatakkeja ja Toledon terästä (Guilted Jackets And Steel Of Toledo) (1994)
- Homo Sapiens (1994)
- Yövieraat (Night Guests) (1996)
- Outo elämä (Strange Life) (1998)
- Normaalien maihinnousu (Disembarkation Of The Normal Ones) (1999)
- Lauluja metsästä (Songs From The Forest) (2001)
- Leppymättömät (Relentless Ones) (2003)
- Keppijumppaa (Gymnastic Exercises With A Cue) (2005)
- Vapauden kaupungit (Cities Of Freedom) (2008)

=== EPs ===
- Who Dares Farts (1989)
- Whlap-Zap Ninja (1989)
- Turpasauna (The Beating) (1990)
- Julmasti juhlallista (Cruelly Festive) (1991)
- Minä olen myyrä (I Am The Mole) (1993)
- Me viihdytämme teitä (We Entertain You) (1999)
- Minä en tiedä mitään (I Don't Know Anything) (2005)
- Maailmannäyttely (World Exposition) (2008)

=== Singles ===
- Daavidin Fuzz/Paratiisin sahakielet (David's Fuzz/Saw Tongues Of The Paradise) (1992)
- Jumala halkaisi ihmisen kahtia (The God Split Human In Two) (1994)
- Homo Sapiens (1995)
- Porvariston hillitty charmi (Composed Charm Of The Burghers) (1996)
- Tavaroiden taikamaailma (Magic World Of Wares) (1997)
- Tuuliajolla (Adrift) (1998)
- Mitä luoja teki ennen kuin loi maailman? (What Did The Creator Do Before Creating The World?) (1998)
- Meitä odotellaan mullan alla (We Are Waited Under The Soil) (1999)
- Varjoleikit (Shadow Games) (1999)
- Pohjaton säkki (Bottomless Sack) (2000)
- Ihana elämä (Wonderful Life) (2001)
- Rakkaus on pesti hulluuteen (Love Is A Job To The Madness) (2001)
- Joutilas (The Idle) (2003)
- Pahassa paikassa (In The Bad Place) (2003)
- Päivä kerrallaan (Day By Day) (2004)
- Intiaanit ymmärtävät (Amerindians Understand) (2005)

=== Compilations ===
- 1990-1992 (1992)
- Hajota ja hallitse 1993-2001 (Break And Rule 1993-2001) (2001)
- The Hippos From Hell & Other Oddities 1988-1990 (2003)
- Helppoa kuunneltavaa (Easy listening) (2004)

== Other published works ==
=== Books ===
- Helppoa soiteltavaa (Easy Playing) (Like, 2004)
- Helppoa soiteltavaa II (Easy Playing II) (Like, 2005)

=== DVDs ===
- Helppoa katseltavaa (Easy Watching) (2004)
