= Diablo (band) =

Finnish metal band

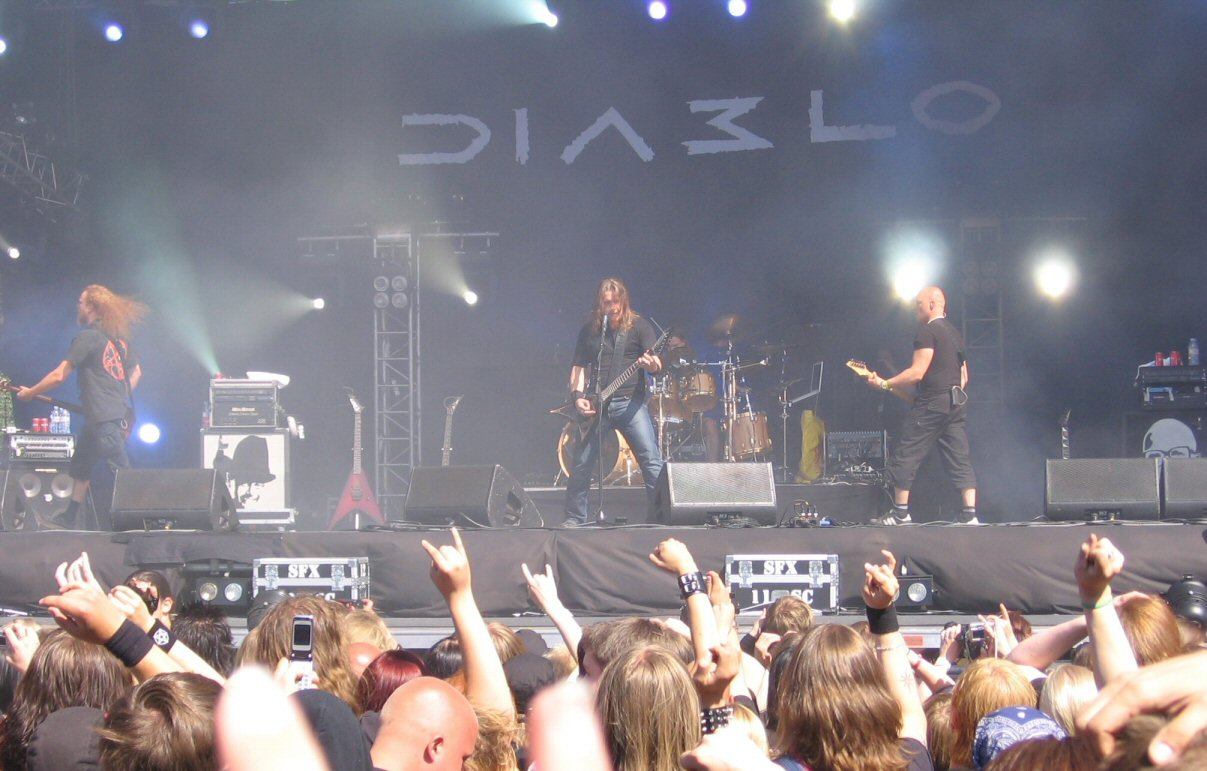
- Diablo at Tuska Open Air in 2006

Background information
- Origin: Finland
- Genres: Melodic death metal, groove metal, thrash metal
- Years active: 1995–present
- Labels: Poko (2006−2008); Sakara (2008–present)
- Website: diabloperkele.com

Diablo is a Finnish melodic death / groove metal band, formed in 1995 as Diablo Brothers. The band cite Testament, Slayer, Metallica, Megadeth, Opeth, Death and Meshuggah as influences, but influence from several Gothenburg bands such as Dark Tranquillity, Hypocrisy and In Flames is also evident in their music. The band has released seven studio albums, the most recent of which, When All the Rivers Are Silent, was released in 2022.

== Members ==
=== Current members ===
- Marko Utriainen – lead guitar (1995–present)
- Aadolf Virtanen – bass (1995–present)
- Heikki Malmberg – drums (2000–present)

=== Former member ===
- Rainer Nygård – vocals, guitar (1995–2026)
- Timo Kemppainen – drums (1995–2000)

== Discography ==
=== Albums ===
- Elegance in Black (2000)
- Renaissance (2002)
- Eternium (2004)
- Mimic47 (2006)
- Icaros (2008)
- Silvër Horizon (2015)
- When All the Rivers Are Silent (2022)

=== Singles ===
- "Princess" (1999)
- "Intomesee" (2002)
- "Read My Scars" (2003)
- "Mimic47" (2005)
- "Damien" (2005)
- "Icaros" (2008)
- "Isolation" (2015)
- "Grace Under Pressure" (2019)
- "The Extinctionist" (2020)
- "The Stranger" (2022)
