= Mimic47 =

Studio album by Diablo
- Released: 18 January 2006
- Recorded: 2005
- Genre: Melodic death metal, thrash metal, groove metal
- Length: 43:24
- Label: Poko Rekords

Diablo chronology
Eternium (2004)	Mimic47 (2006)	Icaros (2008)

Mimic47 is the fourth album by Finnish melodic death metal band Diablo. It debuted at #1 on the Finnish albums chart.

== Track listing ==
1. "Shadow World" – 3:36
2. "Damien" – 4:39
3. "Together As Lost" – 3:36
4. "In Sorrow We Trust" – 4:31
5. "Mimic 47" – 3:10
6. "Condition Red" – 4:46
7. "Kalla" – 1:56
8. "Blackheart" – 4:08
9. "Kathryn" – 3:58
10. "Rebellion of One" – 3:17
11. "D.O.A." – 5:49

== Personnel ==
- Rainer Nygård – vocals, guitar
- Marko Utriainen – guitar
- Aadolf Virtanen – bass
- Heikki Malmberg – drums
