= Eternium (album) =

Studio album by Diablo
- Released: 19 January 2004
- Genres: Melodic death metal, thrash metal, groove metal
- Length: 43:43
- Label: Poko Rekords

Diablo chronology
Renaissance (2002)	Eternium (2004)	Mimic47 (2006)

Eternium is the third album by Finnish melodic death metal band Diablo.

== Track listing ==
1. "Symbol of Eternity" – 3:54
2. "Read My Scars" – 3:42
3. "Queen of Entity" – 3:51
4. "Lovedivided" – 4:26
5. "Faceless" – 3:19
6. "The Preacher" – 3:14
7. "In Flesh" – 3:10
8. "Black Swan" – 4:40
9. "Omerta" – 3:23
10. "Shape Shifters" – 4:13
11. "Reptiles" – 5:19

== Personnel ==
- Rainer Nygård – vocals, guitar
- Marko Utriainen – guitar
- Aadolf Virtanen – bass
- Heikki Malmberg – drums
