= Mana Mana =

Finnish rock band

- Origin: Joensuu, Finland
- Genres: Post-punk, heavy metal
- Years active: 1986–1991
- Labels: Gaga Goodies, Rubber Rabbit Rock'n' Roll Records, Riemu
- Members: Jouni Mömmö, Otra Romppanen, Janne Suhonen, Tuomas Moilanen, Timo Puukko

Mana Mana was a rock band from Joensuu, Finland. It was formed in 1986 by singer-songwriter-guitarist Jouni Mömmö and lead guitarist Arto "Otra" Romppanen. Their musical style could be described as a mixture of goth and death rock, punk and metal with heavy stoner rock and hints of grunge.

== Career ==
Before Mana Mana, Mömmö's band was Silmienvaihtajat ("Eye changers"), named after the poem of Uuno Kailas. Most of the band's lyrics had been written at that time. This band's music can be heard on Silmienvaihtajat: 1985-1986 (Svart SVR077CD).

Mana Mana's trademark was to use multiple overdubbed, distorted guitar tracks in their studio recordings, as many as 8–12 per track. Their heavy music was accompanied by haunting vocals by Mömmö sung in Finnish. Mömmö wrote all the lyrics for the group, and the texts often dealt with topics filled with religious symbolism, personal revelations, the apocalypse, death, psychedelia, insanity and stories of love gone wrong. The lyrics were often blaming (sometimes attacking Christianity) and typically depressing, gloomy and mentally disturbed. The name of the band is apparently a reference to the concept of mana in Polynesian mythology.

Their career was rather short; during their original existence Mana Mana made only a few vinyl singles and one LP album, Totuus palaa (engl. The truth is burning), which was released in 1990. Their inability to continue was because of Mömmö's deteriorating mental condition – he suffered from schizophrenia, had been in and out of a mental institute and became almost catatonic at some point, thus making it impossible for the band to create new material and to do live shows. One of their final efforts was to re-record vocal tracks with English translations of some of their songs from Totuus palaa in order to achieve a possibility of success abroad. These songs were "Totuus palaa" (retitled "Truth is Burning"), "Ilmestyskirjan peto" ("The Beast"), "Kuolla elävänä" ("To Die Alive") and "Ketä sä rakastat?" ("Who Do You Love?"). However, Mömmö was already too deranged to perform and his voice was barely audible. The recordings weren't released until after his death on the Complete... Kaikki CD compilation.

Mömmö committed suicide by taking an overdose of drugs on 26 October 1991. He was 35 years old.

After Mömmö's death, Mana Mana played many live shows as a tribute, with two different vocalists, Kimmo "Kaltsu" Kuosmanen and Sami Tiilama. In 1998, lead guitarist Otra Romppanen started to compile song material out of old 4-track demos, rehearsal tapes and notebooks. A new Mana Mana album, Murheen laakso (A Valley of Tears) was released in 2000 as a tribute to Mömmö. Sami Tiilama did most of the vocal parts, and Antti Litmanen from Babylon Whores featured as one of the guitarists on the album. He also accompanied on Mana Mana's "burial tour" the same year. A live CD was made of their final show at Tavastia Club, Helsinki in the 2001. It was titled Kuolla elävänä (To Die Alive) and was released in 2004. After the official split-up of the actual band, former Mana Mana members have continued performing tribute concerts under moniker Murheen laakso.

Many Finnish artists have covered their songs in their live acts, and Finnish groups such as Kotiteollisuus, PMMP and Viikate have recorded their own cover versions of Mana Mana songs.

== Personnel ==
- Jouni Mömmö – vocals and guitars
- Arto "Otra" Romppanen – lead guitars
- Tuomas Moilanen – bass
- Timo Puuko – drums
- Janne Suhonen – guitars (from 1990)
- Antti Litmanen – guitars (2001, on Murheen laakso)

== Discography ==
- Maria / Vaarallista (7" single, 1988)
- Totuus palaa (LP, 1990)
- Raptori / Suikki (7" single, 1990) – "Raptori" is a sarcastic adaptation of Kraftwerk's "The Robots" and "Suikki" is a cover song from Finnish group Neljä Ruusua.
- Hän on paha (5" split-single, 1994)
- Complete... Kaikki (CD compilation, 1996) – Includes all previously released studio material along with four songs from Totuus palaa with overdubbed vocal tracks sung in English.

Post-Mömmö era

- Murheen laakso (CD, 2000)
- Kuolla elävänä – live 2001 (CD, 2004)
- 2000–2001 (2-CD compilation, 2005) – A 2-disc set that includes the albums Murheen laakso and Kuolla elävänä
