= Jouni Hynynen =

Finnish musician and writer

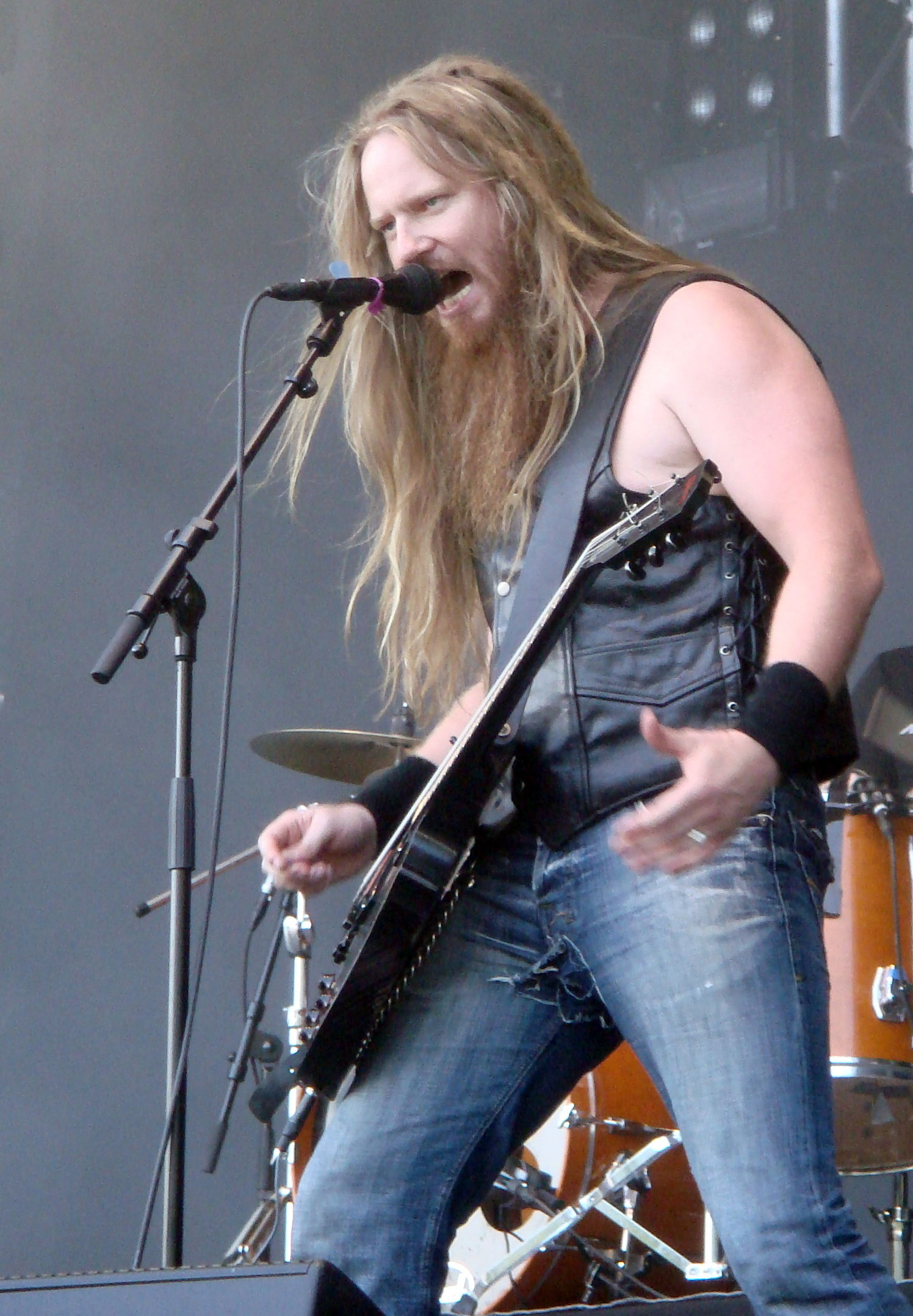
Jouni Hynynen

Jouni Kalervo Hynynen (born 15 February 1970) is the guitarist/vocalist in Kotiteollisuus, a Finnish heavy metal band. He also writes the band's music along with his bandmates, and contributes majority of the lyrics. He has also written books, hosted a reality TV show called "Äijät" ('The men') with Jone Nikula and been a columnist for newspapers. He is known not only for his desperate and dark lyrics and his extraordinary looks and attitude, but also his sense of humour, which can be seen, for example, in NO SORI!, where Hynynen is the "special editor-in-chief". Hynynen, along with his Kotiteollisuus bandmates Hongisto and Sinkkonen, and Antti "Hyrde" Hyyrynen of Stam1na, his brother Janne (formerly of Mokoma) and Kaarle of Viikate use the magazine to make fun of tabloids, among other things.

Hynynen lives currently in Lappeenranta with his wife and child. He has also been in a band called Pronssinen Pokaali during 1995–2000. He has also done several guest appearances, for example in Nightwish (on Once) and in Viikate (on Vuoden synkin juhla and Unholan Urut).
