= Jarkko Martikainen =

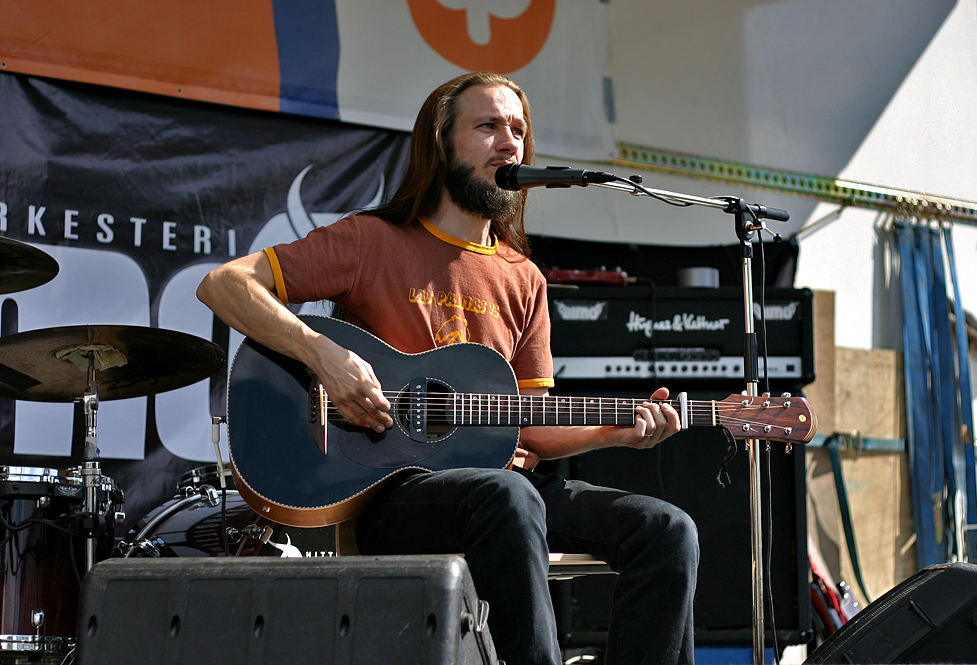

Background information
- Born: 24 October 1970 (age 54); Greifswald, GDR
- Years active: 1987–present
- Labels: Levy-yhtiö
- Website: jarkkomartikainen.fi

Jarkko Martikainen (born 24 October 1970 in Greifswald, GDR) is a Finnish singer, songwriter and member of the rock band YUP. In addition to his musical career, Martikainen has worked as a columnist, a record producer and a documentary filmmaker. Martikainen has also illustrated his first solo-album Mierolainen (2004) and YUP's third album, Toppatakkeja ja Toledon terästä (1994).

Martikainen has a very versatile and distinct voice. His lyrics are satirical and are influenced by old Russian authors like Mikhail Bulgakov and especially Daniil Harms. Martikainen's lifestyle could be described as "a bit of a Tolstoyan".

In 2005, Martikainen published a collection of short stories, Pitkät piikit ja muita kertomuksia, which, among other things, criticizes modern lifestyle and consumerism.

== Bibliography ==
- Pitkät piikit ja muita kertomuksia (2005)
- 9 teesiä: Säkeitä kadonneiden arvojen metsästäjille (2008)

== Discography ==
=== Albums ===
Year	Album	Peak positions	Certification
Year	Album	FIN	Certification
2004	Mierolainen	3	
2006	Rakkaus	10	
2009	Toivo	12	
2011	Usko	4	
2014	Koirien taivas	2	
2016	Ruosterastaat	6	
2018	Aina auki (with Luotetut miehet)	9	
2023	Itse tehty elämä	10	

Live albums

Year	Album	Peak positions
Year	Album	FIN
2007	Hyvää yötä hyvät ihmiset	–

=== Singles ===
Year	Single	Peak positions	Album
Year	Single	FIN	Album
2009	"Polte päästä paratiisiin"	1	
2009	"Jokainen sotilas on vihollinen"	2	
