= Sakara Records =

Finnish record label

Sakara Records logo

Sakara Records is an independent Finnish metal/rock record label. It was found in 2003 by the Finnish metal group Mokoma. Since then the label has added the Finnish bands Stam1na, Rytmihäiriö, Black Bile, Diablo and YUP.

Mokoma was formed in Lappeenranta in 1996, initially as a traditional rock band, and released two records on the EMI label. Neither record sold well, and EMI was not supportive of the band's plan to move into thrash metal, so the band formed Sakara Records in 2003 to produce their own music. The Finnish metal band Stam1na, formed in 1996, was also struggling to gain interest from mainstream labels, and became the second group to sign up with Sakara, releasing their self-titled debut in the spring of 2005. In January 2008 the Finnish metallers Diablo signed up with Sakara Records to record their fifth album "Icaros". Sakara Records next signed up Black Bile, and in April 2008 issued Black Bile's debut album "Great Ape Language".

In 2006, the label issued Sakara Tour 2006, a live DVD from the 2006 joint tour of the label's three bands Mokoma, Stam1na and Rytmihäiriö at Nosturi in Helsinki, Teatria in Oulu and Rytmikorjaamo in Seinäjoki. By the end of 2009, the company had issued six records that made it to number one on the Finnish charts.
