= List of bands from Finland =

This page lists bands and musicians that originate from Finland.

== # ==
- 22-Pistepirkko
- The 69 Eyes

== A ==
- Aavikko
- Absoluuttinen Nollapiste
- Advanced Art
- Agents
- Agit-prop
- Agonizer
- Aikakone
- Ajattara
- Aknestik
- Alamaailman Vasarat
- Albert Järvinen
- Alivaltiosihteeri
- Altaria
- Am I Blood
- Amberian Dawn
- Amoral
- Amorphis
- Ancara
- ...and Oceans
- Angel of Sodom
- Angelit
- Anzi Destruction
- Apocalyptica
- Appendix
- Apulanta
- Archgoat
- Arion
- Arthemesia
- Auri
- Avanti! Chamber Orchestra
- Avarus
- Azaghal

== B ==
- Baptism
- Barathrum
- Barren Earth
- Los Bastardos Finlandeses
- Bat & Ryyd
- Battle Beast
- Battlelore
- Beast in Black
- Beat
- Beats And Styles
- Before the Dawn
- Beherit
- Behexen
- Ben Granfelt Band
- Bitch Alert
- The Black League
- Blind Channel
- Bloodpit
- Blues Section
- Bob Malmström
- Bomfunk MC's
- Boulevard
- Brother Firetribe
- Brymir
- Burning Point

== C ==
- Cadacross
- Cain's Offering
- Callisto
- Cardiant
- Catamenia
- CatCat
- Charon
- Children Of Bodom
- Chromatic Dark
- Circle
- Club For Five
- CMX
- Collarbone
- Come Inside
- The Crash
- Cyan Kicks

== D ==
- Dallapé
- Dallas Superstars
- Damn Seagulls
- Daniel Lioneye
- The Dark Element
- Dark Sarah
- Dark the Suns
- Darude
- Dawn of Solace
- Death Hawks
- Deathbound
- Deathchain
- Deep Insight
- Demigod
- Demilich
- Demolition 23
- Deuteronomium
- Diablo
- Dingo
- Disco Ensemble
- DJ Kridlokk
- Dolorian
- Don Huonot
- Don Johnson Big Band
- Doom Unit
- Dreamtale

== E ==
- Edea
- Egotrippi
- Elokuu
- Elonkerjuu
- Elonkorjuu
- Eläkeläiset
- Ember Falls
- End of You
- Ensiferum
- Entwine
- Eppu Normaali
- Ernos
- Eternal Tears of Sorrow
- Eurocrack
- Excalion

== F ==
- Falchion
- Fanu
- Farmakon
- Feiled
- Finlanders
- Finnforest
- Finntroll
- Fintelligens
- Firevision
- The Flaming Sideburns
- Flinch
- For My Pain...
- French Films
- Frigg
- Fröbelin Palikat

== G ==
- G-Powered
- Ghost Brigade
- GG Caravan

== H ==
- Haloo Helsinki!
- Hanoi Rocks
- Happoradio
- Harmaja
- Hasse Walli
- Hassisen Kone
- Hateform
- Havoc Unit
- HB
- Hehkumo
- Hevein
- Hevisaurus
- HIM
- Horna
- Hurriganes
- Husky Rescue

== I ==
- Iconcrash
- Imatran Voima
- Immortal Souls
- Impaled Nazarene
- Indica
- Insomnium

== J ==
- Janne Westerlund
- Jeavestone
- Jormas
- JPP
- JS16
- Jukka Tolonen
- Justimus
- JVG
- Järjestyshäiriö

== K ==
- K-X-P
- Kaaos
- Kaj Chydenius
- Kalmah
- Kapasiteettiyksikkö
- Kapteeni Ä-ni
- Kaseva
- Katra
- Kemialliset Ystävät
- Kemopetrol
- Kerkko Koskinen
- Killer
- Killer Aspect
- Kilpi
- Kimmo Pohjonen
- Kingston Wall
- Kiuas
- Kivimetsän Druidi
- Klamydia
- Kliff
- Kolmas Nainen
- Korpiklaani
- Kotipelto
- Kotiteollisuus
- Krypts
- KYPCK
- Kuunkuiskaajat
- Kwan
- Kylähullut

== L ==
- LAB
- Lapinlahden Linnut
- Lapko
- The Latebirds
- Leevi and the Leavings
- Leningrad Cowboys
- Liimanarina
- Lodger
- Loituma
- Lord Est
- Lordi
- Lost Society
- Lovex
- Lullacry
- Jaakko Löytty

== M ==
- Machine Men
- Magyar Posse
- Maj Karma
- Major Label
- Mamba
- The Man-Eating Tree
- Mana Mana
- Mannhai
- Martti Vainaa & Sallitut aineet
- Masquerade
- Matti ja Teppo
- Mehida
- Metsän Alttari
- The Micragirls
- Mieskuoro Huutajat
- Minotauri
- Misery Inc.
- Mokoma
- Moonsorrow
- Moottörin Jyrinä
- Mors Principium Est
- Motelli Skronkle
- Movetron
- Musta Paraati
- myGRAIN

== N ==
- National Napalm Syndicate
- Negative
- Neljä Ruusua
- Neljänsuora
- Nest
- Neuroactive
- Nightwish
- Norma John
- Norther
- Northern Kings
- Notkea Rotta
- Noumena
- Nylon Beat

== O ==
- Omnium Gatherum
- One Morning Left
- Op:l Bastards
- Oranssi Pazuzu

== P ==
- Paavoharju
- Pain Confessor
- Pan Sonic
- Pariisin Kevät
- Paul Oxley's Unit
- Peer Günt
- Penniless
- Pertti Kurikan Nimipäivät
- Pharaoh Overlord
- Pihasoittajat
- PMMP
- Poets of the Fall
- Pohjannaula
- Poisonblack
- Popeda
- Private Line
- Profane Omen

== R ==
- Radiopuhelimet
- Rajaton
- Raptori
- Rapture
- The Rasmus
- Rattus
- Rautakoura
- Reckless Love
- Regina
- Renascent
- Reverend Bizarre
- Revolution Renaissance
- Rifftera
- RinneRadio
- Ripsipiirakka
- Roope Salminen & Koirat
- Rotten Sound
- Rubik
- Ruoska
- Russian Love
- RUST
- Rytmihäiriö
- Rättö ja Lehtisalo

== S ==
- Santa Cruz
- Sapattivuosi
- Sara
- Sargeist
- Satanic Warmaster
- Satellite Stories
- Satin Circus
- Saturnian Mist
- Scandinavian Music Group
- The Scourger
- Seminaarinmäen mieslaulajat
- Sentenced
- Shade Empire
- Shape of Despair
- Shooting Gallery
- Sielun Veljet
- SIG
- Silent Voices
- Silentium
- Sinamore
- Sinergy
- Sir Elwoodin hiljaiset värit
- Skepticism
- Sleepy Sleepers
- Slipping Stitches
- Smack
- Snow White's Poison Bite
- Softengine
- Solution 13
- Sonata Arctica
- Sotajumala
- Soulcage
- Spiritus Mortis
- Stalingrad Cowgirls
- Stam1na
- Stella
- Steve 'n' Seagulls
- Stone
- Stratovarius
- Sturm und Drang
- Suburban Tribe
- The Suicide Twins
- Sunrise Avenue
- Suomen Talvisota 1939–1940
- Symfonia
- Swallow the Sun

== T ==
- Tarot
- Tasavallan Presidentti
- Tehosekoitin
- Tenhi
- Teräsbetoni
- Terveet Kädet
- Throes of Dawn
- Thunderstone
- Thy Serpent
- Timo Rautiainen & Trio Niskalaukaus
- Timo Tolkki's Avalon
- To/Die/For
- Topmost
- Torture Killer
- Tracedawn
- Trees of Eternity
- Trio Töykeät
- Tsuumi Sound System
- Tuomo & Markus
- Tuure Kilpeläinen ja Kaihon Karavaani
- Turisas
- Turmion Kätilöt
- Turo's Hevi Gee
- TV-resistori
- Twilight Guardians
- Twilight Ophera
- Twilightning
- Two Witches

== U ==
- Ultra Bra
- UltraNoir
- Uniklubi
- Unshine

== V ==
- The Valkyrians
- Ville Valo
- Valvomo
- Velcra
- Verjnuarmu
- Vesterinen Yhtyeineen
- Viikate
- Vilddas
- Villieläin
- Villa Nah
- VIRTA
- Von Hertzen Brothers
- Värttinä

== W ==
- Waldo's People
- Waltari
- Warmen
- Wigwam
- Wiidakko
- Winterborn
- Wintersun
- Wöyh!

== X ==
- Xysma

== Y ==
- YUP
- Yö
- Yölintu
- Yön Polte

== Z ==
- Zen Café
- Zook

== See also ==
- List of Finnish singers
- List of Finnish musicians
- List of Finnish jazz musicians
