= Rock music in Finland =

Finnish rock (Finnish: suomirock or suomirokki—also known as Finnsrock, Finnrock or Finrock) is rock music made in Finland. The initial rock and roll boom of the 1950s was preceded by a long tradition of popular culture. Suomirock may refer to Finnish rock music in general or more narrowly rock music sung in the Finnish language.

== Timeline ==
Finnish rock followed the common trends during the 50s and 60s. Usually Finnish rock bands performed covers or hit songs translated into Finnish. Eero Raittinen and his brother Jussi Raittinen are among the earliest rockers of the 1960s, alongside groups such as Jormas, Topmost and Ernos. The British band The Renegades found their biggest success in the 1960s Finland. Helsinki was the centre of Finnish rock and pop music during this period. Love Records was one of the first domestic record labels dedicated to Finnish rock, even though the label's roster also included jazz and political songs. Suomen Talvisota 1939-1940 represented Finnish underground, and their only album Underground-Rock (1970) is cited as a big influence among many current Finnish music-makers. Other Finnish underground/psychedelic bands of this era were The Sperm, Apollo and the ground-breaking Blues Section, which spawned Wigwam and Tasavallan Presidentti after its split.

At the beginning of the 1970s new artists emerged. Singer-songwriters such as Hector and Juice Leskinen started writing songs in Finnish, combining shades of irony, poetry and introspection with rock sound. Later in the seventies the new wave and punk brought more artists such as Pelle Miljoona, Eppu Normaali and Hassisen kone. Finnish rock had by now become independent. Names such as Dave Lindholm, Tuomari Nurmio and Ismo Alanko continued with their own styles. Tampere became at the turn of the 1970s and 80s the most vibrant town in rock culture, spawning "Manserock" as rock music by the town's artists was called.

Hurriganes, fronted by Remu Aaltonen, was one of the best-known groups in Finland. This 1970s group played hard-hitting, boogie-based simple rock, and their song "Get on" is almost anthemic in Finland. Ex-Hurriganes guitarist Albert Järvinen would later collaborate with the likes of Lemmy Kilmister of Motörhead fame, issuing the Countdown 12" single, with Lemmy featuring on lead vocals on the title track, under the name of Albert Järvinen Band. Other seminal groups were Dingo, a pop-rock group idolized by teenagers, and Yö, whose "Joutsenlaulu" remains to the day one of the most played songs in radio and karaoke. Kingston Wall was a cult band of the early 90s, combining psychedelic influences with hard rock, played by power trio and fronted by Petri Walli. J. Karjalainen has also remained popular since the early 1980s. Well-known Finnish band CMX also formed in 1985, transforming from a hardcore punk sound through progressive, metal, and hard rock sounds.

== Success abroad ==
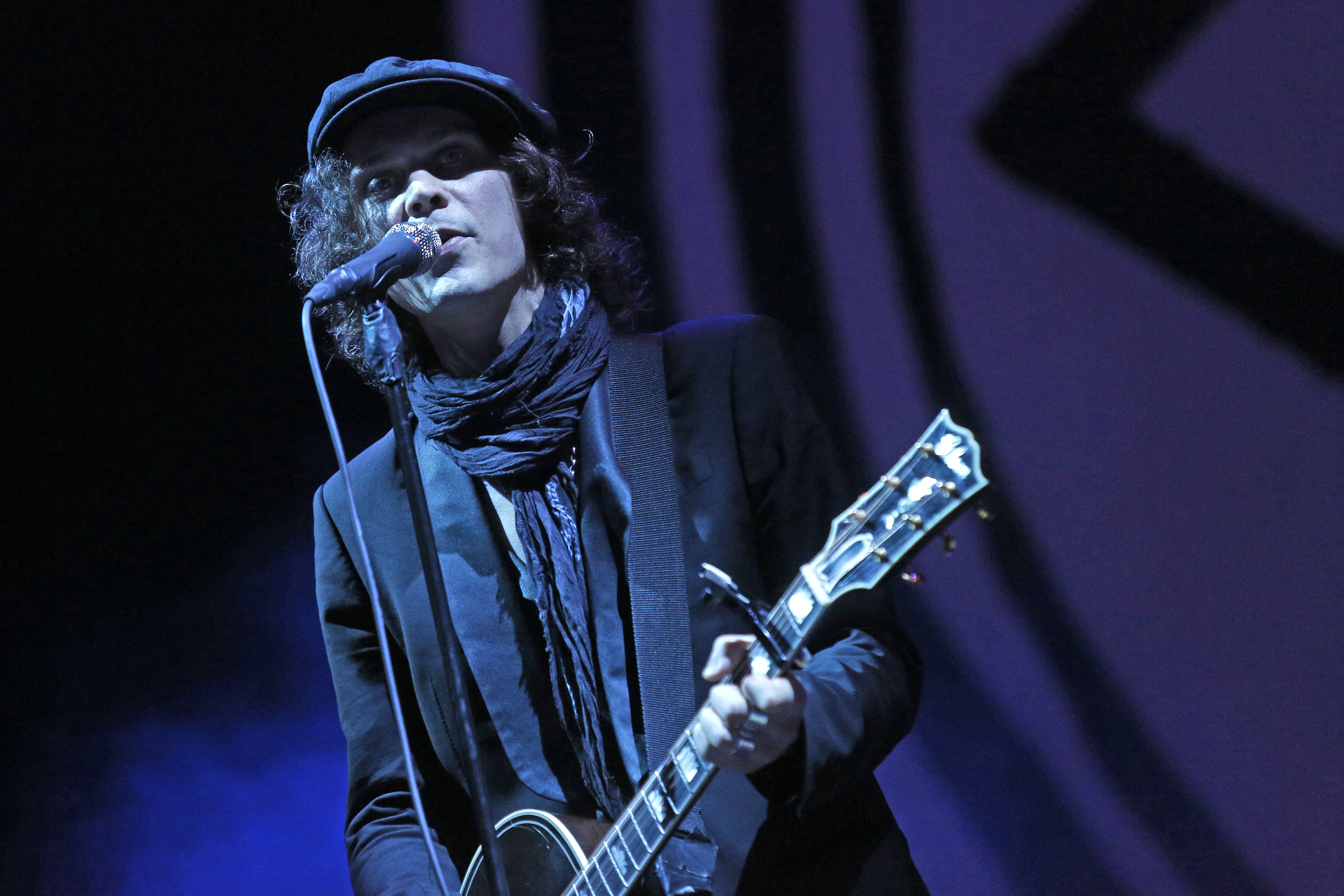
HIM was the first Finnish band to release an album that would sell gold in US

The earliest Finnish rock bands to gain any notoriety were progressive rock bands like Tasavallan Presidentti and Wigwam. Though for a time they seemed poised to break through in Europe, international fame eluded them. 1980s bands were similarly unable to find an international following, such as Gringos Locos and Havana Black; one exception to this was Hanoi Rocks, a popular glam rock band. They are still the most respected Finnish group abroad. For example, in Japan there's still almost fanatic Hanoi Rocks fans. Though the band collapsed on the verge of final international breakthrough, they were the source of inspiration for glam rock bands of the 1980s including Guns N' Roses.

Some modern bands who have achieved some mainstream rock success abroad include Leningrad Cowboys, known for performing with the Red Army Choir, surf band Laika & the Cosmonauts and prog-related rock band Von Hertzen Brothers.

22-Pistepirkko has had a cult status in Europe, notably in the Netherlands and Germany. The trio's indie-rock incorporates blues and melancholy melodies, with a touch of Tom Waits.

== Heavy metal ==
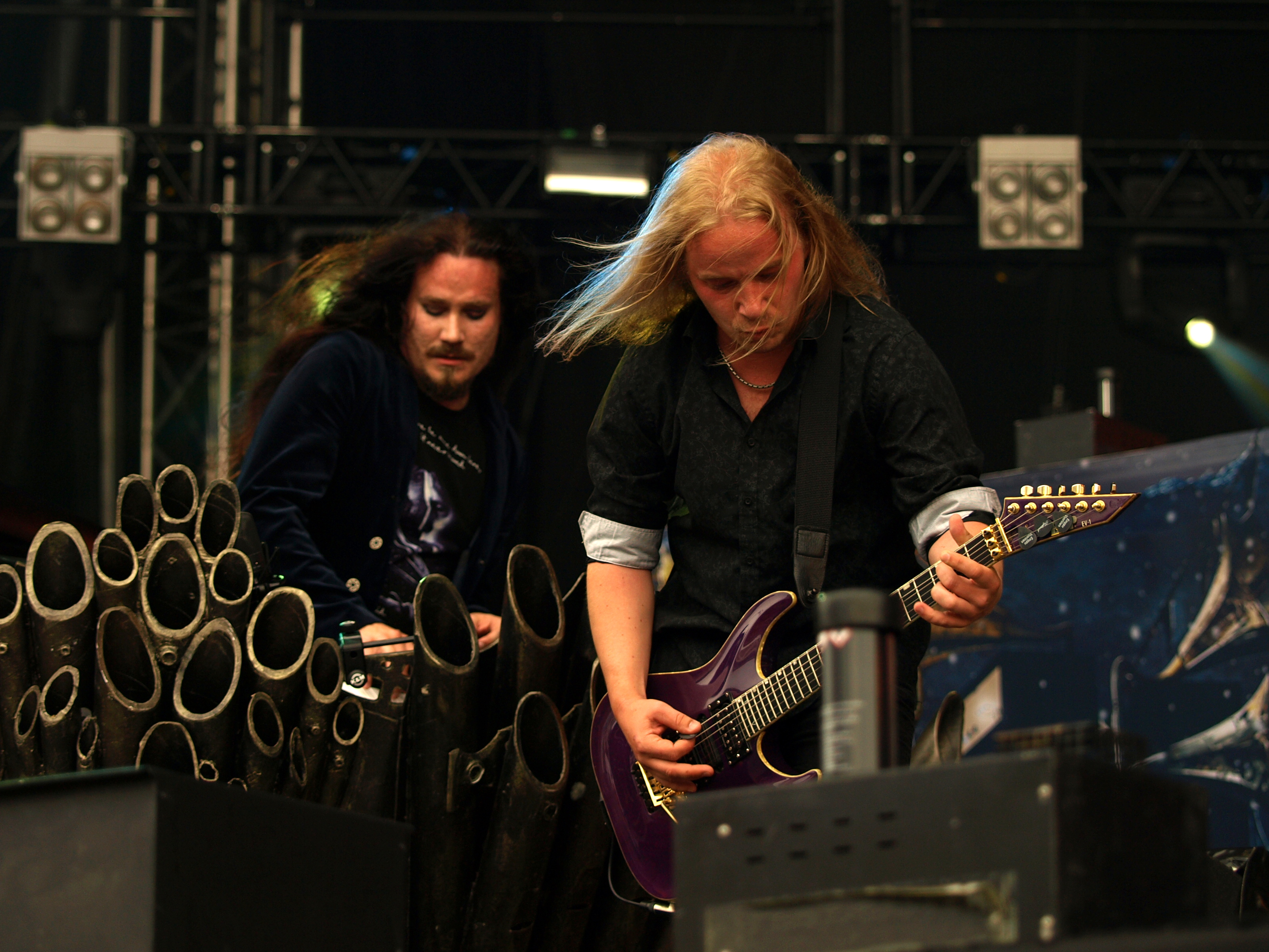
Nightwish is one of the most popular Finnish metal bands.

Like much of Scandinavia (or, more accurately Fennoscandia), Finland's main contribution to modern popular music may be heavy metal and related fields. Early 80s Finnish hard rock and heavy metal bands of note include Riff Raff, Oz, and Zero Nine while Tarot, Stratovarius and thrashers Stone would first emerge in the late 80s. Since then the Finnish scene has given rise to bands like Children of Bodom, Amorphis, Nightwish, Apocalyptica, Impaled Nazarene, Beherit, Archgoat, Waltari, Entwine, The 69 Eyes, Sinergy, Sentenced, Sonata Arctica, Am I Blood, Ensiferum, Turisas, Moonsorrow, Korpiklaani, Finntroll, Wintersun, Battlelore, Machine Men, Mannhai, To/Die/For, Battle Beast, Falchion, Beast in Black and Teräsbetoni.

A popular Finnish band abroad is HIM whose music has been labeled "love metal". HIM and The Rasmus topped album charts in several European countries with their most popular albums. HIM got also a gold record in the USA in 2006. The international success of HIM and The Rasmus during the current decade is wider than any Finnish group has gotten before.

Finland were also the winners of the 2006 Eurovision Song Contest, with the first heavy metal band to enter the competition, Lordi. Lordi won with their Hard Rock Hallelujah composition, sporting elaborate costumes. Since then, they have found success across Europe and limited publicity outside of the continent. Lordi have also competed in Kuorosota, the Finnish version of Clash of the Choirs.

Throughout the Finland and Scandinavian countries there has been an uprising of 80s era "glam metal" bands heavily influenced by bands like Mötley Crüe and Guns N' Roses with a modern twist like Reckless Love, Santa Cruz, Crashdïet and Hardcore Superstar.

== Extreme metal ==
Finland, like its Scandinavian neighbors, also has a notable extreme metal scene, which is internationally successful. The Finnish bands in extreme metal include Amorphis, Children of Bodom, Beherit, Archgoat, Impaled Nazarene, and the grindcore band Rotten Sound, which recently signed to the American label Relapse Records.

The extreme metal scene in Finland is highly dominated by death metal of various subgenres ranging from melodic death metal such as Omnium Gatherum to more old school traditional death metal bands like Demilich and Convulse, the second of whose first album has been thrice reissued by the aforementioned Relapse Records—most recently in 2013—as well as by Finland’s own Svart Records in both 2018 and 2019.

== Finnish rock and heavy metal artists and bands ==
- The 69 Eyes
- Ajattara
- Aknestik
- Altaria
- Am I Blood
- Amberian Dawn
- Amorphis
- Andy McCoy
- Apocalyptica
- Appendix
- Apulanta
- Archgoat
- Los Bastardos Finlandeses
- Battle Beast
- Battlelore
- Beherit
- Ben Granfelt
- Blind Channel
- Bloodpit
- Blues Section
- Before the Dawn
- Callisto
- Carmen Gray
- Catamenia
- Celesty
- Charon
- Children of Bodom
- Convulse (band)
- costee
- CMX
- Damn Seagulls
- Dark Sarah
- Deep Insight
- Demilich
- Dingo
- Disco Ensemble
- Don Huonot
- Dreamtale
- End of You
- Ensiferum
- Entwine
- Eppu Normaali
- Erja Lyytinen
- Eternal Tears of Sorrow
- Excalion
- Falchion
- Feiled
- Finntroll
- Flinch
- The Flaming Sideburns
- Haloo Helsinki!
- Hanoi Rocks
- Hanna Pakarinen
- Happoradio
- Hassisen kone
- Hector
- Hevisaurus
- Hidria Spacefolk
- HIM
- Hurriganes
- Impaled Nazarene
- Indica
- Insomnium
- Jann Wilde
- Jeavestone
- Kaaos
- Kalmah
- Kemopetrol
- Kingston Wall
- Kiuas
- Klamydia
- Korpiklaani
- Kotiteollisuus
- KYPCK
- Leevi and the Leavings
- Lordi
- Lost Society
- Lovex
- Lullacry
- Lyijykomppania
- Juice Leskinen
- Maj Karma
- Mana
- Mana Mana
- Michael Monroe
- Mokoma
- Moonsorrow
- Mors Principium Est
- Pate Mustajärvi
- Negative
- Neljä Ruusua
- Nightwish
- Norther
- Passionworks
- Peer Günt
- Pelle Miljoona
- Penniless
- PMMP
- Poets of the Fall
- Poisonblack
- Popeda
- Private Line
- The Rasmus
- Rauli Badding Somerjoki
- Reckless Love
- Rotten Sound
- Ruoska
- Rytmihäiriö
- Santa Cruz (band)
- Sentenced
- Shade Empire
- ShamRain
- Sielun Veljet
- Sinamore
- Sinergy
- SomBy
- Sonata Arctica
- Sotajumala
- Stam1na
- Stalingrad Cowgirls
- Stella
- Stone
- Stratovarius
- Sturm Und Drang
- Sunrise Avenue
- Swallow the Sun
- Tabula Rasa
- Tarja
- Tarot
- Tasavallan Presidentti
- Tehosekoitin
- Terveet Kädet
- Teräsbetoni
- Thunderstone
- Timo Rautiainen & Trio Niskalaukaus
- To/Die/For
- Tuomari Nurmio
- Turisas
- Turmion Kätilöt
- Uniklubi
- Velcra
- Verjnuarmu
- Viikate
- Villieläin
- Von Hertzen Brothers
- Maija Vilkkumaa
- YUP
- Yö
- Waltari
- Wasara
- Wigwam
- Wiidakko
- Winterborn
- Wintersun
- Zen Café
- Zook

== See also ==
- Suomisaundi
- Music of Finland
