= End of You =

End of You may refer to:

- "End of You" (song), by American heavy metal singers Poppy, Courtney LaPlante and Amy Lee
- End of You (band), a Finnish alternative rock/gothic metal musical ensemble
- "The End of You", a 1999 song by Sleater-Kinney from the album The Hot Rock
