= Jüri Lina =

Estonian journalist and writer (born 1949)

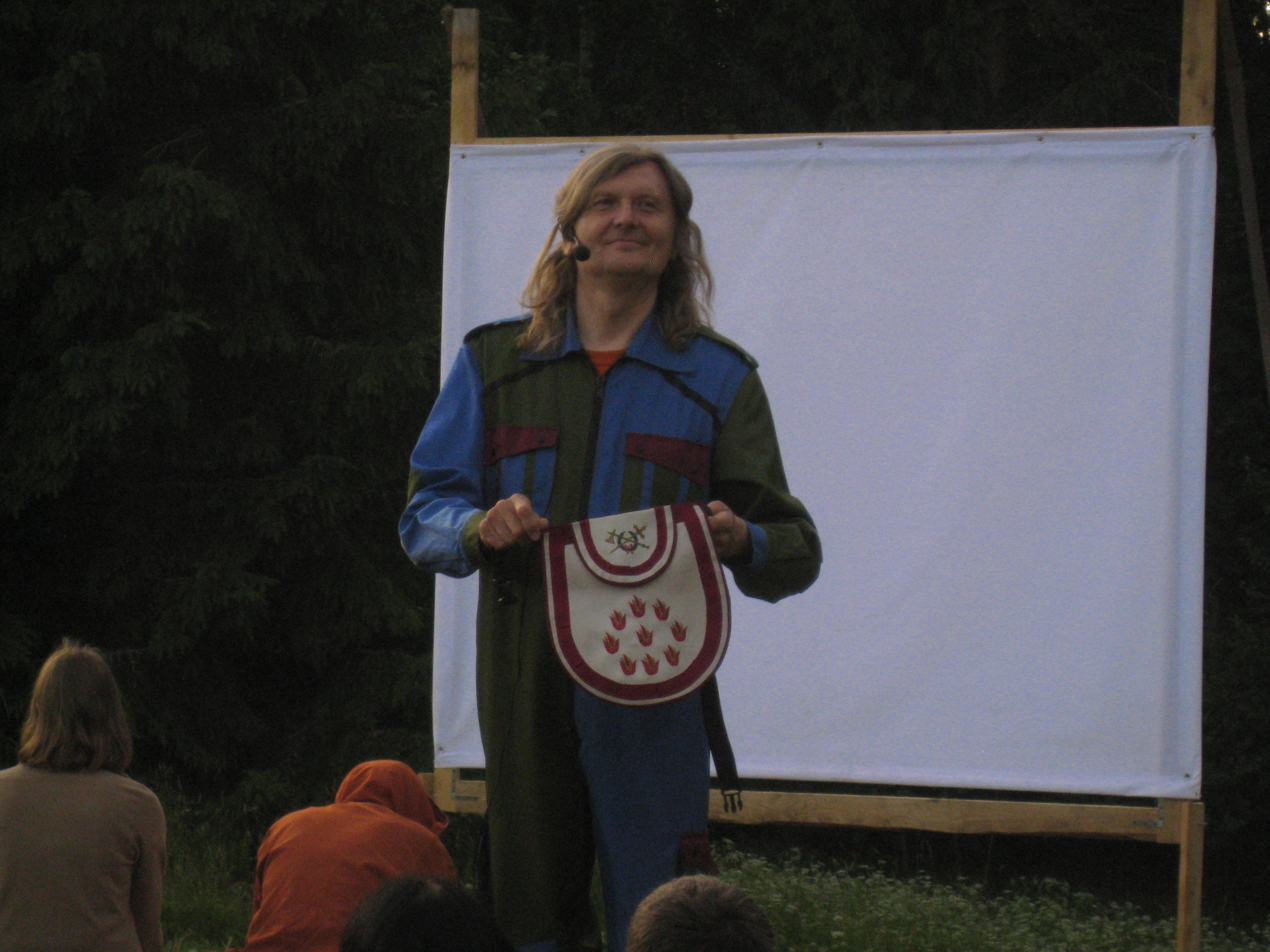
Jüri Lina holding a Masonic apron.

Jüri Lina (born 13 October 1949 in Tartu) is an Estonian journalist, writer, music producer, radio host, film director, ufologist and conspiracy theorist.

In 1960s and 1970s he published many works (articles, reviews, translations) which were anti-Soviet. Due to discord with Soviet powers, in 1979 he was expelled from Estonia by Soviet authorities. Since then he has lived mainly in Sweden. In 1991 he was rehabilitated. Lina's works are usually antisemitic, anti-Masonic, and critical of socialism. He is one of the most well known Holocaust deniers of Estonia.

== Biography ==
From 1960 to 1970, Jüri Lina first began to write articles, reviews and translations and produced radio programs, the most famous of which was "Pobifo revüü", the first program of which was broadcast on Eesti Raadio's corresponding II program, or Vikerraadio, on 22 May 1968.

In 1967, Lina participated in the founding of the film club Amfo in Tartu, being its first president in the same year. In the summer of 1968, he started working with the composer Toivo Kurmet, whose work he started recording on the radio. In the fall of 1968, the Finnish pop band Ernos organized a performance in the Estonia concert hall.

Lina gave lectures to students, students and companies at the initiative of the Ühing Teadus. In 1972, he founded the underground publishing house Agart, publishing both his own works and translated works in manuscript form, the main part of which was literature on paranormal topics, but also translated works of fiction. In May 1972, the ensemble Ruja organized a series of concerts in Estonia as part of the "Popsalong", where he himself presented reviews of pop music. The event was banned by the KGB. He engaged in performing poetry performances at underground cultural evenings in both Tartu and Tallinn. He collaborated with the director and actor Jaan Tooming, with whom he recorded the poetry performance "Virvatuled udus", which was broadcast on Eesti Raadio.

On 2 May 1975, the KGB searched Jüri Lina's home, hoping to find anti-Soviet materials, which were not there. The KGB later gave him a stern warning for ideological diversion during the interrogation in the KGB building on Vanemuise Street. In the same year, Jüri Lina was banned from publishing for dissident views. After conflicts with the KGB, he moved to Helsinki, Finland, in April 1979 and then on to Sweden in August of the same year. He later performed on Estonian-language foreign radio, including Estonian Radio in Stockholm, Voice of America in Washington, D.C., and Radio Free Europe in Munich. In 1984, the KGB initiated a criminal case against Jüri Lina based on his publicist activities, including the books Öised päevad and Sovjet hotar Sverige, on the basis of treason, the investigation lasted several years until he was rehabilitated in 1991.

== Publications and films ==
Swedish

- Sovjet hotar Sverige (1983, 2. uppl. 1984)
- UFO-forskning i Sovjetunionen (1984)
- Kommunisternas heliga krig. Om internationella röda hjälpen, dess taktik och historia (1986)
- Bakom Gorbatjovs kulisser (1987)
- UFO-gåtan fördjupas (1992)
- Under Skorpionens tecken: Sovjetmaktens uppkomst och fall (1994, 1999, 2013, 2020)
- Sovjetiskt inflytande i Sverige. Om Sveriges väg utför (1997)
- Världsbyggarnas bedrägeri: Frimurarnas dolda historia (2001, 2. uppl. 2007)
- I skuggan av Hermes: Kommunismens hemligheter (2009)
- Den omättliga Ouroboros: Frimurarnas lömska taktik (2011)
- Kraftmätningen: Frimurarnas fallor (2012)
- Januseffekten: Baals slavar (2015)
- Illusonernas labürint: uniformedad mångfald (2016)
- Den förfalskade världen (2018)
- Sprickor i fasaden (2019)
- Sovjetrepubliken Absurdistan: En socialistisk katastrof i Sverige (2022)

Estonian

- Öised päevad: olumärkmeid Eestist, Nõukogude Liidust ja mujaltki (1983, 3. uppl. 2005)
- Mida Eesti ajakirjandus pelgab? (1996)
- Skorpioni märgi all (1996, 1998, 2003, 2017)
- Mõistatuslikkuse kütkeis (1996)
- Filmikunsti väljenduslikkusest (1998)
- Varjatud tervisevalem (1999, 2009, 2011, 2015, 2016, 2021, 2023)
- Maailmaehitajate pettus (2003, 2004, 2020, 2023)
- Eemaldumine Kartaagosse (2006)
- Eesti-rootsi sõnaraamat (co-author Maie Vinter)(2014)
- Rokiajastu resonantsid (2018)

English

- Under the Sign of the Scorpion: the Rise and Fall of the Soviet Empire (1998, 2002, 2014)
- Architects of Deception: The Concealed History of Freemasonry (2004)
- The Lightbringers: The Emissaries of Jahbulon (2005 documentary film)
- In the Shadow of Hermes: The Secrets of Communism (2009 documentary film)
- The Janus effect: the slaves of Baal (2015 documentary film)
- The labyrinth of illusions: regimented diversity (2016 documentary film)
- The fake world (2018 documentary film)
- Cracks in the facade (2019 documentary film)
