= Kaamos =

Kaamos may refer to:

- Kaamos, a word in the Finnish language for Polar night
- Kaamos (Swedish band), a Swedish death metal band
  - Kaamos (Kaamos album), 2002
- Kaamos (Finnish band), a Finnish progressive rock band
- Kaamos (Thomas Köner album), 1998
- "Kaamos", a song by Sentenced from the 1998 album Frozen
- "Kaamos", a song by Apocalyptica from the 2000 album Cult
