= Joku Paikallinen Bändi =

Finnish rock band

Joku Paikallinen Bändi (Finnish for "some local band") is a Finnish rock band from Kemi, established in 1998. The band specializes in playing Suomirock classics and is known for its active performance schedule, averaging around 120 gigs annually, making it one of the most active bands in Finland.

== History ==
The band was founded in 1998 by vocalist Heikki "Heme" Vieresjoki. Initially, the group performed original songs, but after facing challenges with audience turnout, they transitioned to covering popular Finnish rock and roll hits. By 2005, Joku Paikallinen Bändi had become one of the most sought-after bands in Finland, primarily touring in the northern regions.

The band's name originated from Heme's humorous response to inquiries about the band's identity while working as a doorman, leading to the phrase "I don't remember. It is some local band." This playful naming also inspired the pub Joku Paikallinen Pubi in Oulu, named after the band.

== Members ==
The lineup has changed over the years. Original members included Antti Lainas (drums, keyboard, and vocals), Janne Jokisalo (guitar), Janne Posti (guitar), Marko Tirkkonen (bass), Santtu Heikkinen (drums) and Simo Aalto (drums). The last original members, Heme and Posti, left the band in 2011. The current members are Pyle (vocals), Tupe (drums), Jussi (bass), and Late (guitar).

== Recent activities ==
In 2023, Joku Paikallinen Bändi embarked on a nationwide tour, performing at various music festivals and venues across Finland. The band's latest album, "Suomirock Klassikot 2.0," was released in June 2023 and debuted at number 3 on the Finnish album charts.

== Cultural impact ==
Joku Paikallinen Bändi has become an integral part of the Finnish rock music scene, known for their energetic live performances and dedication to preserving the legacy of Suomirock. The band has also been involved in various community events, raising funds for local charities and supporting up-and-coming artists through their annual music festival, "Paikallisfest."

== Discography ==
- Joku Paikallinen Bändi (2002)
- Suomirock Klassikot (2005)
- Hittejä Vuosikymmeniltä (2010)
