= Mucus (disambiguation) =

Mucus is a slippery secretion produced by, and covering, mucous membranes.

Mucus may also refer to:

- Major Mucus, a character from Earthworm Jim
- Rubella Mucus, a character from Camp Lazlo

== See also ==
- St. Mucus or Am I Blood, a Finnish thrash metal band
- Mucus Man, a character from Aqua Teen Hunger Force
- Mucous membrane
