= A Warm Glimpse =

Studio album by Farmakon
- Released: 2003
- Recorded: February–March 2003, at Sound Sound studios
- Genre: Progressive death metal
- Length: 47:30
- Label: Earache
- Producer: Farmakon

Farmakon chronology
A Warm Glimpse (2003)	Robin (2007)

A Warm Glimpse is the first studio album released by Finnish progressive death metal band Farmakon. The album was originally released in 2003, under Earache Records. The opening track, "Loosely of Ameobas" was included on Earache's "Metal: A Headbanger's Companion II" compilation.

The musical style mixes death metal with funk and jazz, with both clean vocals and death growls, interspersed throughout the songs, and scat singing done in both methods, on "Flavored Numerology". The style is frequently cited as being similar to the works of Opeth, Mr. Bungle, and Atheist.

== Track listing ==
All music by Farmakon; Lyrics by Lassi Paunonen and Marko Eskola

1. "Loosely of Amoebas" – 4:55
2. "My Sanctuary in Solitude" – 5:07
3. "Mist" – 4:15
4. "Stretching Into Me" – 6:14
5. "Same" – 3:22
6. "Flowgrasp" – 6:40
7. "Flavored Numerology" – 4:54
8. "Pearl of My Suffering" – 6:49
9. "Wallgarden" – 5:18

== Credits ==
=== Band ===
- Lassi Paunonen – Guitars
- Toni Salminen − Guitars
- Riku Airisto – Drums
- Marko Eskola − Vocals, Bass

=== Production ===
- Produced by Farmakon
- Mixed by Pirkka Rannali
- Mastered by Mika Jussila at Finnvox
- Cover Design by Timo Vuorensola and Eemeli Haverinen
- Photography by Eemeli Haverinen
