= Tuomo & Markus =

Finnish musical group

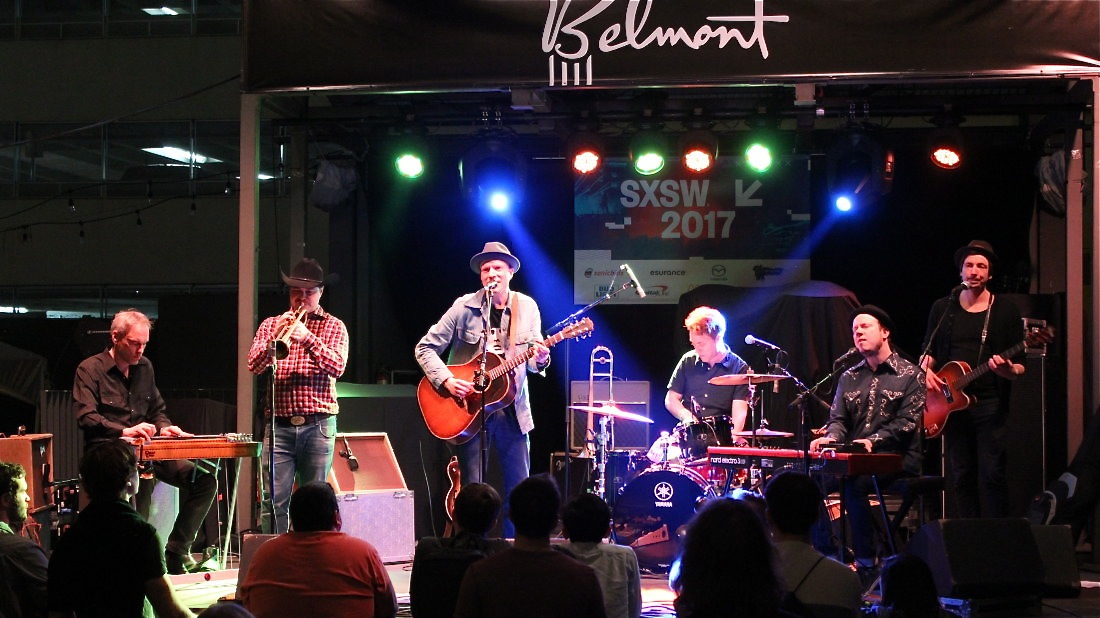
Tuomo & Markus at SXSW 2017 in Austin Texas USA

Tuomo & Markus is a Helsinki Finland based musical group founded by Finnish soul artist and jazz musician Tuomo Prättälä and singer/songwriter Markus Nordenstreng from Finnish rock band The Latebirds. The two also occasionally perform and record under the alias Pratt & Moody.

Tuomo & Markus are known for their vocal harmonies. Their music has been described as indie folk and Nordic Americana.

== History ==
The two artists met in Helsinki in 2007 while performing in an all-star benefit show. After realizing they shared a common love for vocal harmonies and American roots music, T'uomo & Markus started periodically performing and writing together. The new songs led to recording sessions at Wavelab Recording Studio in Tucson Arizona. These sessions also featured various notable American musicians including Joey Burns, John Convertino and Jacob Valenzuela from Tucson-based Calexico, Wilco members John Stirratt and Pat Sansone, as well as Gary Louris from the Jayhawks who also contributed one song on the album.

Tuomo & Markus' debut album Dead Circles ended up taking almost four years to complete. The double album was finally released in Finland and the rest of Scandinavia in August 2016 as a vinyl only release (North American and European releases came out in 2018). Dead Circles was well received in Finland, earning favorable reviews in publications like Helsingin Sanomat and Yleisradio. The album also did relatively well commercially despite being a vinyl only release, making it to Finnish Top-20. Spotify curated the album's opening track Over The Rooftops to a popular internationally recognized playlist. The same track has been on constant rotation on stations like KEXP and KCRW.

The band started working on their sophomore album Game Changing while touring in North America. Most of the tracks were recorded at Jonathan Wilson's studio in Los Angeles CA and Flowers Studio in Minneapolis MN with their full touring band. Jonathan Wilson was featured on several tracks, playing drums, bass, keyboards and lead guitar, along with guitarist Marc Ribot, folk musician Pekko Käppi and jazz trumpet virtuoso Verneri Pohjola. The liner notes for the album were written by journalist legend David Fricke who had earlier described the band's sound in Rolling Stone as "a marvelous debut steeped in the pioneer stories of The Band, the painted-desert psychedelia of the American Beauty-era Grateful Dead and the modernist extensions of Wilco and Tucson band Calexico".

The album's release was stalled because of the pandemic and vinyl production challenges. Game Changing was finally released worldwide on January 13, 2023, getting very favourable reviews internationally and hitting top 10 in Finland.

In February 2025 Tuomo & Markus released Music For Roads - a new immersive jazz instrumental album that they composed and recorded together with Finnish jazz trumpet virtuoso Verneri Pohjola. Featured guests included guitar legend Marc Ribot and French jazz artist Sylvain Rifflet. The album has gained favourable reviews and reached #5 on Finnish physical album charts. Music For Roads was recorded, mixed and mastered in Dolby Atmos and it's considered the first fully analog Dolby Atmos master in the world.

Tuomo & Markus have composed and performed the soundscape for Finnair along with famous Finnish radio station Radio Helsinki and their music has been featured in various films and documentaries.

Tuomo & Markus live lineup includes steel guitar player Miikka 'McGyver' Paatelainen, drummer and trombone player Juho Viljanen and bass player Jere Ijäs. Since 2016 Tuomo & Markus has also featured distinguished Finnish jazz trumpet player Verneri Pohjola, the son of legendary bass player and Wigwam member Pekka Pohjola. Tuomo Prättälä has performed with Verneri Pohjola in the past in Finnish jazz group Ilmiliekki Quartet.

Tuomo & Markus have shared stages with many notable artists ranging from Neil Young to Wilco and The Jayhawks.

== Members ==
- Tuomo Prättälä – lead vocals, piano, keyboards
- Markus Nordenstreng – lead vocals, guitars
- Juho Viljanen – drums, trombone, percussion, backing vocals
- Jere Ijäs – bass, backing vocals
- Miikka 'McGyver' Paatelainen – pedal steel guitar, mandolin
- Verneri Pohjola – trumpet

== Discography ==
- Dead EP (2016)
- Dead Circles (2016)
- Pratt & Moody – "Lost Lost Lost" 7" single (2017)
- Pratt & Moody – "Words Words Words" 7" single (2018)
- Pratt & Moody – "Wheels Turning" 7" single (2020)
- Game Changing (2023)
- Music For Roads (2025)
