= Hector (musician) =

Finnish singer-songwriter (born 1947)

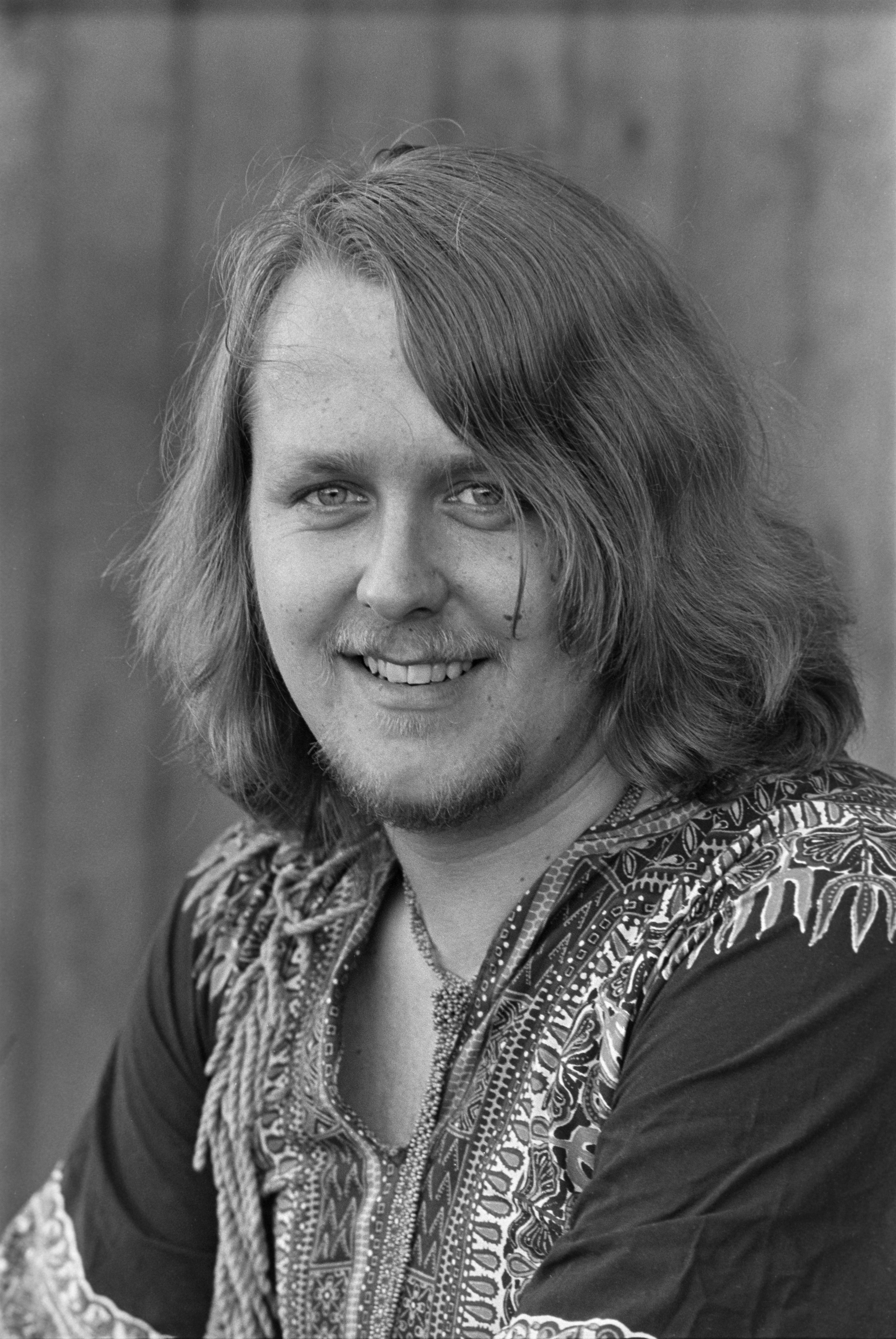
- Hector in 1970

Background information
- Birth name: Heikki Veikko Harma
- Born: 20 April 1947 (age 78) Helsinki, Finland
- Origin: Helsinki, Finland
- Genres: Suomirock, folk rock
- Occupation(s): singer, songwriter
- Instrument: guitar
- Years active: 1965–present

Heikki Veikko Harma (born 20 April 1947) is a Finnish singer-songwriter who has also distinguished himself as a translator of song lyrics, but has written popular lyrics of his own too. To the public he is better known by the name Hector, which he has used since the release of his 1965 debut single "Palkkasoturi", a Finnish translation of Buffy Sainte-Marie's "Universal Soldier". His 1974 album Hectorock I became the fastest-selling record in Finnish history, selling 50,000 units within a few months. Hector was at the height of his popularity in the first half of the 1970s, but his steady string of recordings provided occasional hits well into the 1990s. In the 2000s he made a strong return to popularity with Ei selityksiä, which became one of his most successful albums. In 2007 he made a farewell tour on big arenas, but has performed occasionally after that too. In 2011 he made a massive comeback tour and released a new album Hauras (Fragile) in 2014, ten years after his previous album.

Hector's work is very diverse in its musical styles. He is mainly known for his folk rock songs, but he has also made progressive rock, hard rock and heavy metal songs. He has translated into Finnish works by Don McLean, Procol Harum, King Crimson, Neil Young, David Bowie and several other artists. Today he is considered, due to his extremely long and distinguished career, as first a pioneer and later a mainstay of Suomirock. His lyrics have often a political and/or social component.

Some of Hector's songs are considered classics of Finnish popular music, such as "Lumi teki enkelin eteiseen" (Snow made an angel in the lobby), "Mandoliinimies" (Mandolin man) and "Olen hautausmaa" (I am a graveyard), and he can be considered a primary contributor to Finnish rock music of the 1970s. He has also written song lyrics for other Finnish singers. His song "Juodaan Viinaa" (Let's drink spirits) was covered by Finnish folk metal band Korpiklaani on their 2009 album Karkelo. Hector is the Finnish voice actor of The Muskrat in the Finnish-British animated television family drama Moominvalley (2019–).

In addition to his music career, Heikki Harma has also worked as a music journalist on radio.

== Discography ==
- 1972 Nostalgia
- 1973 Herra Mirandos
- 1974 Hectorock I
- 1975 Liisa pien
- 1976 Hotelli Hannikainen
- 1977 H.E.C.
- 1978 Kadonneet lapset
- 1979 Ruusuportti
- 1980 Linnut, linnut
- 1981 Eurooppa
- 1982 Hyvää yötä, Bambi
- 1985 Hectorock II
- 1987 Nuku idiootti
- 1988 Varjot ja lakanat
- 1990 Yhtenä iltana
- 1992 In concert 1966–91
- 1992 Ensilumi tulee kuudelta
- 1994 Salaisuuksien talo
- 1995 Kultaiset lehdet
- 1999 Hidas
- 2001 Helismaan pikajuna (album of songs by Reino Helismaa)
- 2003 Total Live!
- 2004 Ei selityksiä
- 2014 Hauras

== See also ==
- List of best-selling music artists in Finland
