= Soul for Sale =

Studio album by Soulcage
- Released: April 8, 2009 Finland; May 8, 2009 Germany, Switzerland, Austria; April 23, 2010 UK
- Recorded: 2008–2009
- Genre: Heavy metal, progressive metal
- Length: 39:32
- Label: Hellas Records
- Producer: Hellas Records

Soulcage chronology
Dead Water Diary (2006)	Soul for Sale (2009)

Professional ratings
Review scores
Source	Rating
FREE! Magazine	4/5 stars

Soul for Sale is the second album by Finnish band Soulcage, released in 2009. My Canvas, My Skin was released as the lead single along with a video directed and written by Tuomas Parviainen, reaching number 8 on the official Finnish download chart and number 10 on the Finnish single chart in March 2009.

The album was released in the United Kingdom on April 23, 2010.

== Track listing ==
1. "Flaming Flowers (Send in The Clowns)" - 03:10
2. "I See" - 03:01
3. "My Canvas, My Skin" - 03:18
4. "Ride On" - 02:54
5. "Until You Find Me" - 04:16
6. "Satellite Children" - 03:33
7. "Bleeding" - 03:11
8. "Origin" - 04:04
9. "Stranger in You" - 03:02
10. "You Get So Alone" - 03:36
11. "MIA" - 05:29
