= Costee =

Finnish singer (born 1995)

costee
- costee in 2024

Background information
- Born: January 12, 1995 (age 31)
- Origin: Turku
- Genres: Emo rap, Finnish rock

Jussi Tiainen (born January 12, 1995), known professionally as costee (stylized entirely in lower-case), is a Finnish singer-songwriter. Originally a member of the Turku-based duo Sima, he began his own solo career in 2018. He participated in Uuden Musiikin Kilpailu 2025, where he ultimately placed sixth. He has been nominated for two Emma Awards.

== Biography ==
costee was born on January 12, 1995 and grew up in Turku. He was gifted the drums by his father when he was 8, and soon became interested in music. He subsequently began playing the guitar.

He first came to attention in 2014 when he became a member of Sima, a duo based in Turku, with his high school friend Mathias Hermansson. The duo first began by creating indie music, but became focused on dance-pop.

He subsequently debuted as a solo artist in 2018. His solo music features themes of Finnish rock and emo rap.

He was named a YleX top breakthrough artist in 2019. That same year, he released his first album. It charted on the official Finnish charts for 74 weeks. As of 2026, he has created four albums. In 2024, he went on a national tour.

His music often discusses topics such as mental health. He has stated that he feels happy when he hears that his songs are able to help people struggling with the things he's facing. Many of his fans tattoo his lyrics onto their bodies.

He is also a songwriter who has written for Samu Haber and Lauri Tähkä. He appeared in and helped write songs for Alan Wake 2. He also composed the theme song for Reindeer Mafia.

He has been nominated for two Emma Awards, for Best Newcomer and for Audience Favorite. He has also founded his own record label, Tuhma Music.

He participated in Uuden Musiikin Kilpailu 2025 with his song Sekaisin. He ultimately placed sixth in the final round with 83 points, losing to Erika Vikman.

== Discography ==
Albums
Title	Year	Highest Chart Position on the Official Finnish Charts	Number of Weeks	Publisher
Nää pirut on mun kavereit	2025	4	14	Warner Music Finland
Kaikki Vampyyrit Ei Juo Verta	2022	5	13	Warner Music Finland
Kaikki Loppuu Aina	2020	2	17	Warner Music Finland
Ehkä Joskus Tää Viel Naurattaa	2019	6	74	Warner Music Finland

Singles
Song	Year	Highest Chart Position on the Official Finnish Charts Single Chart	Number of Weeks
Köyhä ja kipee (feat. BESS)	2025	26	2
Epäreilu maailma (with Jemina)	2025	30	1
Sut tahtoisin	2025	17	5
Sekaisin	2025	5	12
Miten sut mielest poistetaan	2024	14	4
Sano vaan	2024	27	4
Silt se tuntuu (feat. Tupe.)	2024	16	3
Anteeks (feat. Fabe)	2024	16	3
Rakastunut Suruun	2023	31	2
Tytöt	2023	36	2
Kuolen Vähän Joka Kerta (Heviteemu ft. Costee)	2023	47	1
Kyynel (Feat. Tippa, Heviteemu)	2022	8	1
Olen Muistanut	2022	7	2
Älä Pyydä Mua Takas Enää	2022	8	2
Levottomat Tuulet (with Adi L Hasla)	2022	3	6
Elämä On Hetken Ihanaa	2021	20	1
Ne Voi Liittyy (Feat. Bizi)	2021	16	1
Nuori Edelmann	2021	9	2
Taas Sun Kaa	2020	12	2
Kunnes Kuollaan	2019	18	1
Satuta Mua Kunnolla	2019	20	1
Pakoon pahaa oloo	2018	N/A	N/A
