= Dead Water Diary =

Studio album by Soulcage
- Released: September 29, 2006
- Recorded: May 19–31, 2005
- Genres: Heavy metal, progressive metal
- Length: 40:17
- Label: Hellas Records

Soulcage chronology
Dead Water Diary (2006)	Soul for Sale (2009)

Professional ratings
Review scores
Source	Rating
RockUnited	5/10

Dead Water Diary is the debut album by Finnish band Soulcage, released in 2006.

== Track listing ==
1. "I Am We" - 03:21
2. "With the Time I Run" - 03:55
3. "Always Searching" - 03:18
4. "Broken Friend" - 03:37
5. "Phantom Limb" - 04:02
6. "Misused Power" - 03:35
7. "Shotdown Truth" - 03:33
8. "The Division" - 04:36
9. "Sum of Choices" - 03:12
10. "The White Light" - 04:02
11. "Dead Water Diary" - 03:06
