= Russian Love =

Finnish rock band

Russian Love was a rock group (active 1986–1998) that came from Northern Finland and was one of the first gothic rock bands in Finland to sing in English and the first one have an album released. Originally the band was formed in Haapavesi, a small village of 7000 inhabitants, but having graduated from high school the group members moved in order to continue their studies in the city of Oulu. Russian Love's career can be divided into a gothic rock/dark wave period (1986–1991) and alternative rock period (1991–1998). During their career Russian Love released five albums. The first album Nergal was re-released in 2007.

== Discography ==
=== Albums ===
- Nergal LP - Break the Records (1988); re-released on CD - Plastic Passion/Eibon Records (2007)
- Flaw In The Cradle LP - Darklands (1990)
- Hover Jack CD - Break Records (1992)
- Meat Mazurka CD - Zen Garden (1995)
- Gala Brutale CD - Zen Garden (1996)

=== Singles and EPs ===
- Malleus Maleficarum vinyl 7-inch EP - self-financed (1987); re-released on CD with Nergal - Plastic Passion/Eibon Records (2007)
- Two / Paper Dolls vinyl 7-inch split-EP with Two Witches - Break the Records (1989)
- "Lonely" / "Call Me There" vinyl 7-inch single - Break the Records (1991)
- "Sure" / "Lonely" vinyl 7-inch single - Break the Records (1991)
- "Understand" / "Surrender" yellow vinyl 7-inch single - Break the Records (1992)
- "Deep End" / "Hank" CDS - Zen Garden (1995)
- Never Say Goodbye Download-single - Russian Love (2010)
