= Ember Falls =

Finnish heavy metal band

- Origin: Tampere, Finland
- Genres: Alternative metal, melodic death metal, metalcore, progressive metal, pop metal, electronicore
- Years active: 2015–2023
- Labels: Spinefarm Records
- Members: Thomas Grove; Jay V Calu; Ace (Juicy Saurus); Oswald
- Past members: OneOfHaze
- Website: emberfalls.com

Ember Falls was a Finnish heavy metal band based in Tampere. Ember Falls was formed in 2015 after the breakup of the band Mekanism, which was founded in 2010. The band released the first single Shut Down with Me in the same year. Ember Falls signed a worldwide record deal with Spinefarm Records. Their first album Welcome to Ember Falls was released in February 2017.

On 17 May 2023 the Band announced on its Instagram that they will dissolve after releasing their final song, Avalon, on 19 May.

The band's music is influenced by melodic metal as well as pop and electronic music.

== Members ==
=== Current members ===
- Tuomas Välimaa – vocals
- Jussi Laakso – lead guitar
- Kalle Laakso – guitar and supporting vocals
- Jussi Saurio – drums
- Olli Heino – bass

=== Former members ===
- OneOfHaze – keyboard (2015–2019)

== Discography ==
=== Albums ===
- Welcome to Ember Falls (2017)
- Ruins (2021)

=== EPs ===
- Experiments (2022)

=== Singles ===
- Shut Down with Me (2015)
- COE (2016)
- The Cost of Doing Business (2016)
- Rising Tide (2017)
- Heart Shaped Black Scar (2019)
- Divine (2019)
- We Are Become Fire (2020)
- The World Is Burning (2020)
- For All (2021)
- The Wall (2021)
- Over My Dead Body (2021)
- Cloud Connected (2022)
- Avalon (2023)
