= Wöyh! =

Finnish rock duo

- Origin: Finland
- Genres: Rock
- Years active: 2011-present
- Label: Kaskelotti Records
- Members: Antti Hyyrynen; Jussi Hyyrynen
- Website: www.woyh.fi

Wöyh! is a Finnish avant-garde rock duo founded in 2011 and made up of brothers Antti (Stam1na) and Jussi Hyyrynen (YUP). Antti writes most of the music whereas Jussi writes the lyrics.

The band made its first live appearance in August 2012 at the Jurassic Rock music festival in Mikkeli, Finland. After the singles "Lokki" and "Hieho", the duo released their debut album Ikkillyk on 8 March 2013 on their own Kaskelotti Records label with distribution by Playground Music. Keyboardist Antti Pitkäjärvi and drummer Anssi Nykänen took part in the album. A third single "Kaskelotti" was released to coincide with the launch of the album.

== Members ==
- Antti Hyyrynen – vocals, bass
- Jussi Hyyrynen – vocals, guitar

== Discography ==
=== Albums ===
Year	Album	Peak positions	Certification
Year	Album	FIN	Certification
2013	Ikkillyk	7	
2015	Dwzyrek	4	
2017	Krtkrtk	3	
2021	IV	7	

=== Singles ===
- 2011: Lokki (Seagull)
- 2012: Hieho (Heifer)
- 2013: Kaskelotti (Sperm Whale)
- 2015: Kamppailu merellä (Battle at Sea)
- 2015: Aarteenryöstäjä (Treasure Hunter/Tomb Raider)
- 2017: V4RHE
- 2017: Rapuarmeija (Crab Army)
- 2017: Kellonpurija (Watching the Watchers)
- 2017: Takaperoisten Kuiskausten Metsä (The Forest of Backward-Whispers)
