= Jeavestone =

Finnish progressive rock band

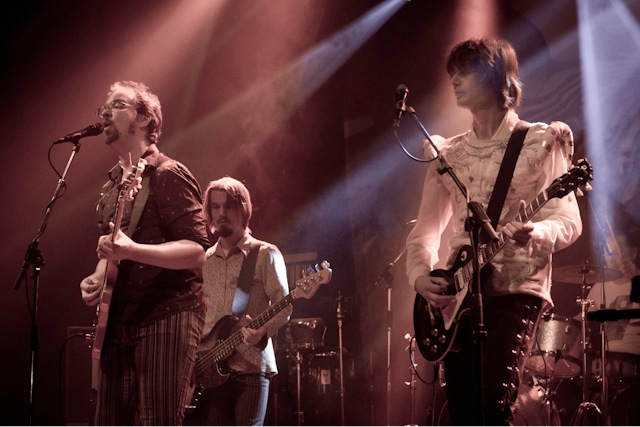
- Jeavestone at the club Tavastia, Helsinki, 2012

Background information
- Origin: Finland
- Genres: Hard rock, progressive rock
- Years active: 1999–present
- Labels: Presence Records, Nordic Notes
- Members: Jim Goldworth (vocals, guitars); Mickey Maniac (guitar, vocals); Tommy Glorioso (bass); Kingo (drums)
- Past members: Angelina Galactique (flute, keyboards, vocals) 2003-2012
- Website: Official website

Jeavestone is a Finnish progressive rock band founded in 1999. The members of the band use stage names and are: Tommy Glorioso (bass), Jim Goldworth (lead vocals, electric and acoustic guitars), Kingo (drums and percussion), and Mickey Maniac (backing vocals, guitar, melodica). They write their music themselves. The band’s first album was released only in Finland, but following some successful concerts in Germany in 2006, their second was also released in Germany, Austria, and Switzerland. In 2009 Jeavestone played its debut performances in the United Kingdom, Denmark, and Sweden.

Jeavestone’s style is so called 'eclectic prog'. They amalgamate the influence of 1970s classic prog acts like Gentle Giant or King Crimson with modern sounding rock, without trying to eschew even humorous aspects. Their instrumentation spans from traditional rock combo on the first album to the extensive use of woodwind and string instruments on the second.

== Discography ==
=== EPs and singles ===
- Jeavestone (2001, EP, self-published)
- Crazy Madness / Beauty Contest (2005, Wolfgang Records)
- Plastic Landscaper (2007)
- Hot Summer Fun / Mirror Monologue (2009, Presence Records)
- Repiphany (2013, Grass Bay Records)

=== Albums ===
- Mind the Soup (2005, Wolfgang Records)
- Spices, Species and Poetry Petrol (2008, Presence Records)
- 1+1=OK (2010, Presence Records)
- Human Games (2016, Presence Records)

=== Compilations ===
- Kaamos's "Delightful" on Tuonen Tytär 2 (2009) (a compilation of Finnish progressive rock of the 1970s)

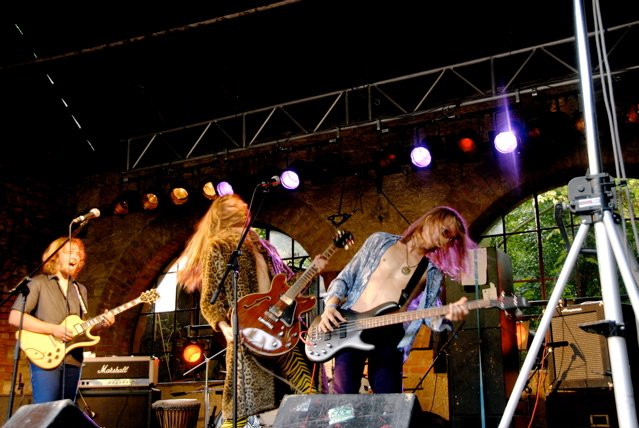
Jeavestone performing at the Freakshow Artrock festival, Würzburg, Germany, 2006
