= Soulcage =

Finnish heavy metal band

- Origin: Helsinki, Finland
- Genres: Heavy metal; progressive metal
- Years active: 1999–present
- Label: Hellas Records
- Members: Aleksi Parviainen - vocals Teppo Parviainen - guitar Markus Hellas - keyboards Jari Ilomäki - bass Ville Siuruainen - drums
- Past members: Asko Kauppinen (1999–2001) - bass Kenneth Bergström (1999–2004) - drums Tuomas Mäkelä - Drums; Taneli Helminen (2001–2006) - bass
- Website: http://www.soulcage.info/

Soulcage are a heavy metal band formed in Helsinki, Finland in 1999.

The band plays melodic metal/rock with progressive influences. In 2004 they released their first demo With the Time I Run, followed by their debut album Dead Water Diary in 2006 with limited success, and the follow-up Soul for Sale in April 2009, reaching a wider audience than they had previously. 'My Canvas, My Skin' was released as the debut single from ‘Soul For Sale’, along with a video directed and written by Tuomas Parviainen. Soulcage are currently signed to the independent label Hellas Records.

Soul for Sale was released on 8 April 2009 in Finland, and on 8 May 2009 in Germany, Austria and Switzerland. It is set to be released on 23 April 2010 in the United Kingdom.

== Members ==
- Aleksi Parviainen - Vocals
- Teppo Parviainen - Guitars
- Markus Hellas - Keyboards
- Jari Ilomäki - Bass
- Ville Siuruainen - Drums

== Discography ==
=== Albums ===
- Dead Water Diary (2006)
- Soul for Sale (2009)

=== EP ===
- Beginning (2014)

=== Demos ===
- With The Time I Run (demo) (2004)
