= Finlanders =

Finnish schlager band

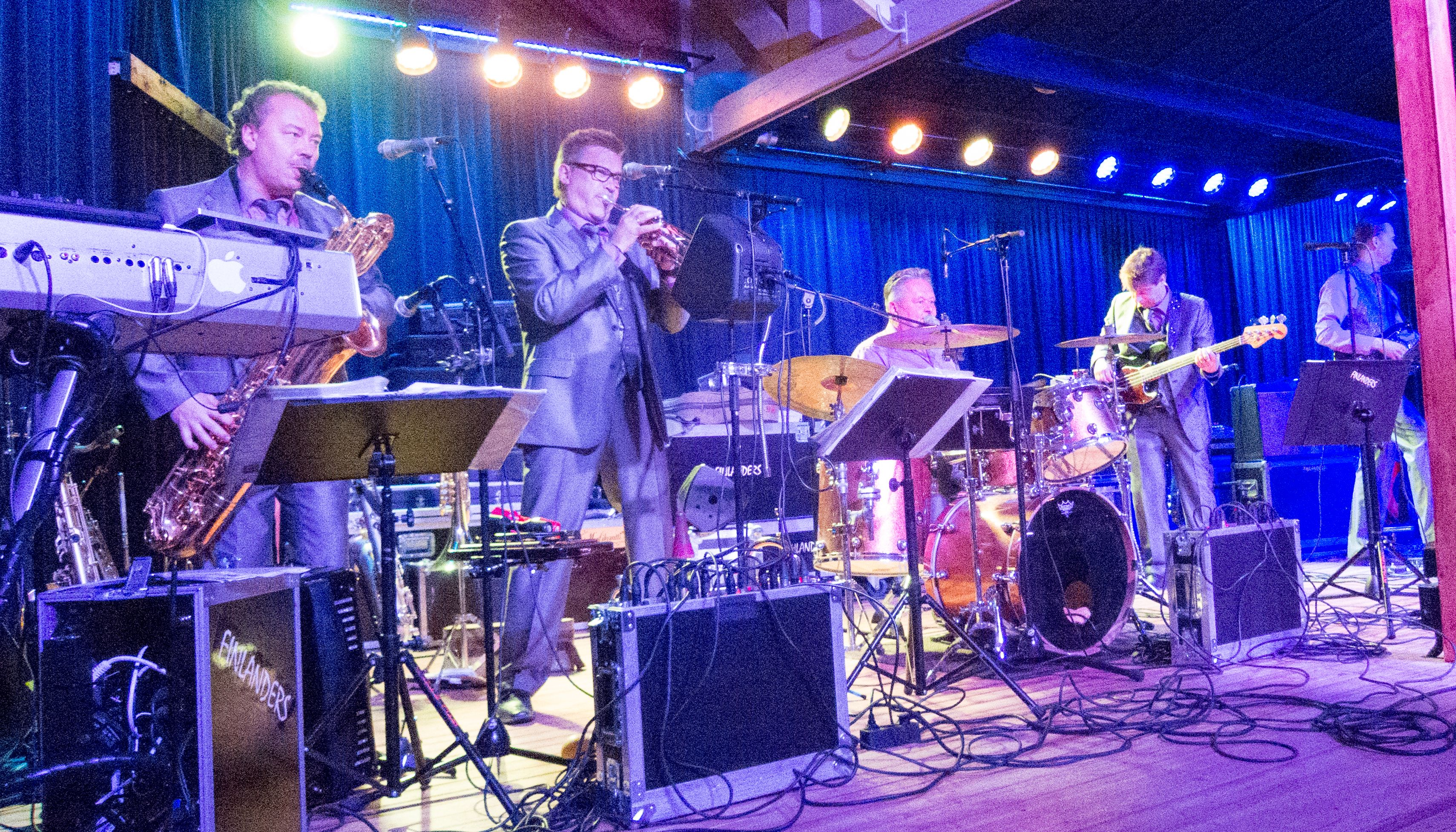
Finlanders

Finlanders is a Finnish schlager band. It has been active since 1984. The members of the band are Aarne Hartelin, Lasse Paasikko, Pasi Ketola, Juha Kangassalo and Juho Jokio. Their album Seikkailija, released in 2005, has been certified platinum in Finland. In addition, three of their other albums have been certified gold.

== Discography ==
- Finlanders esittää (1985)
- Haavenainen (1986)
- Finlanders (1986)
- Bamboleo (1988)
- Painu lähemmäksi kultasein (1990)
- Huviretki (1992)
- Käy tanssimaan (1994)
- Yli tuhannen virran (1995)
- Finlanders tanssittaa (1997)
- Finlanders tanssittaa '98 (1998)
- Vähän enemmän (1999)
- Anna jatkua yön (2001)
- Kauneinta häämusiikkia (2002)
- Et kai luule (2003)
- Seikkailija (2005)
- Mitä sulle kuuluu? (2007)
- Sinun vuokses (2009)
- Iloinen Joulusoitto vol 1 (Finlanders & Seitsemän Seinähullua Veljestä) (Christmas album, 2011)
- Iloinen Joulusoitto vol 2 (Finlanders & Seitsemän Seinähullua Veljestä) (2013)
- Finlanders 30 vuotta Se On Elämää (2014)
- Finlanders Kauneinta Häämusiikkia vol 2 (2014)

=== Compilations ===
- 20 suosikkia – Bamboleo (1997)
- Finlanders parhaat '92-'97 (1997)
- Finlanders 20 v. Juhlalevy (2004)
