= Peer Günt =

Finnish rock band

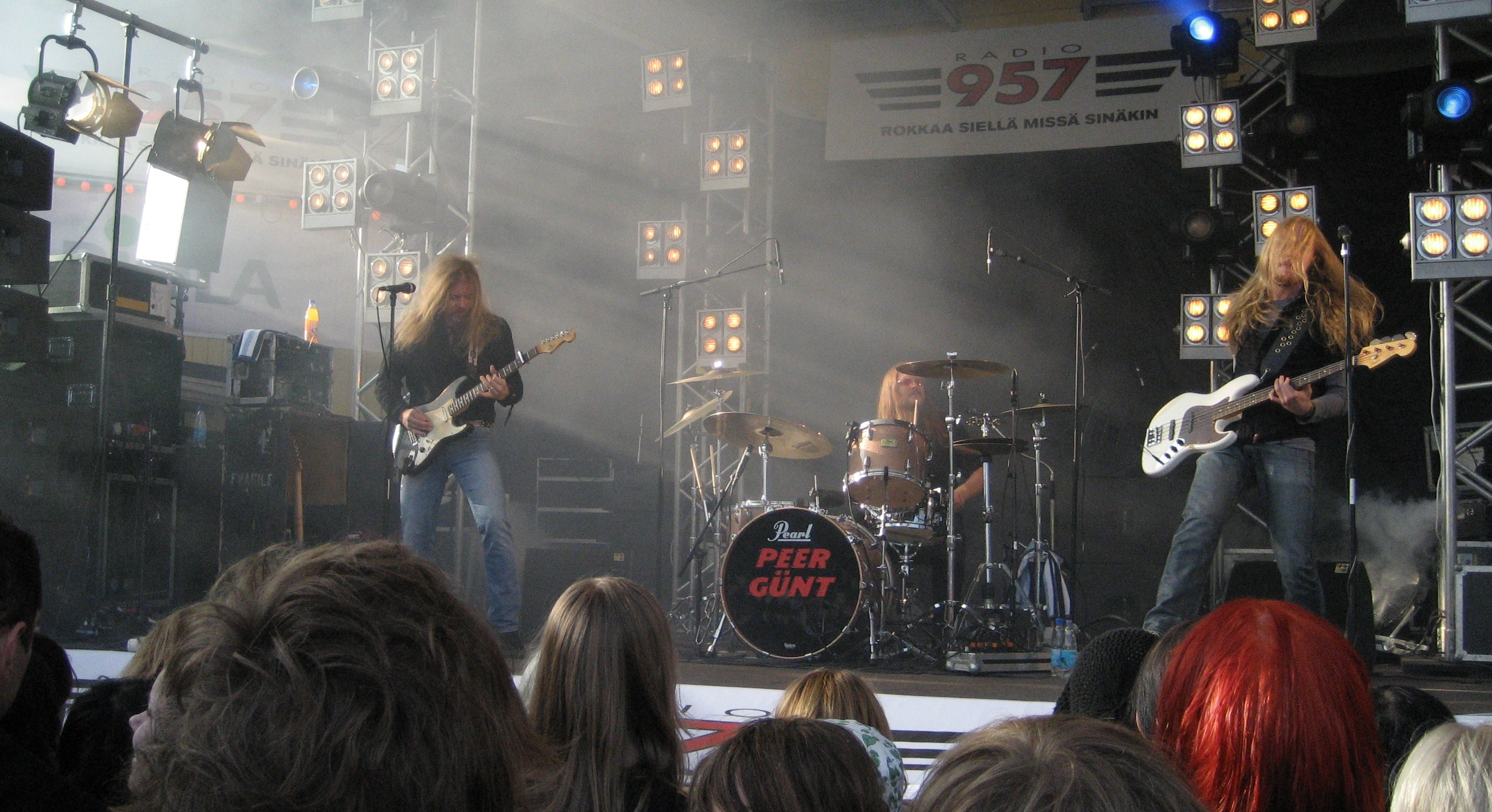
- Peer Günt performing in 2007

Background information
- Origin: Kouvola, Finland
- Genres: Hard rock; blues rock
- Years active: 1976–present
- Members: Timo Nikki; Pete Pohjanniemi; Sakke Koivula
- Past members: Vesa Suopanki; Pauli Johansson; Jussi Kylliäinen; Jukka Loikala; Reima Saarinen; Seppo Karjalainen; Timo Kipahti; Petri Korppi; Teijo Erkinharju; Teijo Kettula

Peer Günt are a Finnish hard rock band from Kouvola, formed in 1976, and named after the 1867 play Peer Gynt, by Henrik Ibsen. They primarily sing in English. As of 2026, they have released nine studio albums, three EPs, two live albums, and five compilations. Vocalist and guitarist Timo Nikki is the sole remaining original member of the band.

Peer Günt won the Rock SM (Finnish Championship) competition in 1984, held at the Helsinki Fair Centre, and the Tavastia contest a year later.

== Band members ==
Current

- Timo Nikki — vocals, guitar
- Pete Pohjanniemi — bass, backing vocals
- Sakke Koivula — drums, backing vocals

Past

- Vesa Suopanki — bass (1976–1977)
- Pauli Johansson — drums (1976–1977)
- Jussi Kylliäinen — lead guitar (1977)
- Jukka Loikala — bass (1977–1979, 1981–1982)
- Reima "Boss" Saarinen — drums (1977–1981)
- Seppo "Sefi" Karjalainen — keyboard (1977–1978)
- Timo Kipahti aka Toni Rossi — vocals, guitar (1979–1980)
- Petri "Crow" Korppi — bass (1979–1981)
- Teijo "Twist Twist" Erkinharju — drums (1981–2005)
- Teijo "Tsöötz" Kettula — bass (1983–2005)

== Discography ==
Studio albums

- Peer Günt (1985)
- Backseat (1986)
- Good Girls Don't... (1987)
- Fire Wire (1988)
- Don't Mess with the Countryboys (1990)
- Smalltown Maniacs (1994)
- No Piercing, No Tattoo (2005)
- Guts and Glory (2007)
- Buck the Odds (2009)

EPs

- Through the Wall (1985)
- Bad Boys Are Here (1986)
- Bartender (1987)

Live albums

- Live at Rockperry (2CD, 2006)
- Live Today, Gone Tomorrow (2009)

Compilations

- Peer Günt 1 / Through the Wall (1987)
- Years on the Road (1989)
- Golden Greats (1997)
- 20 suosikkia – Liquire and Drugs (2002)
- Bad Boys Are Here (2006)

DVDs

- Live at Rockperry (2CD, 2006)
- Live at Tavastia (2007)
