= Bitch Alert =

Finnish punk rock band

- Origin: Helsinki, Finland
- Genres: Punk rock, riot grrrl
- Years active: 1997–2007
- Members: Heinie; Kimmo; Maritta
- Website: https://myspace.com/bitchalert

Bitch Alert is a punk rock band from Helsinki, Finland. Originally under the moniker of Bitch, the band has put out four albums in Finland, and in May 2004 released their debut UK album, ..rriot!. The band has three members: Heinie on vocals and guitar, Kimmo on bass, and Maritta on drums. Their style is the largely underground riot grrrl movement.

In December 2007 the band announced that they are on a break, without a planned end.

== Members ==
- Heinie – singer and guitarist
- Kimmo – bassist
- Maritta – drummer and backing singer

== Discography ==
=== Albums ===
- Pay For Orgasm (2001)
- ..rriot! (2002)
- Kill Your Darlings (2004)
- I Can Feel Your Bones (2006)

=== EPs ===
- Songs For Your Wedding (2002)
- Sunsets For You (2003)
- He's So Cute (7" Germany 2003)
- Monday (7" United Kingdom 2004)
- At the Cinema (2004)
- Video Killed the Radio Star (2005)

=== Singles ===
- Monday (2001)
- Loveson (2001)
- Sandy (2001)
- Latenight Lullaby (2004)
- All Wrong (2006)
- Skeleton (2006)

=== Compilations ===
- Pink Bunnies Get Hit by Big Trucks (2008)
