= Vesterinen Yhtyeineen =

Finnish pop group

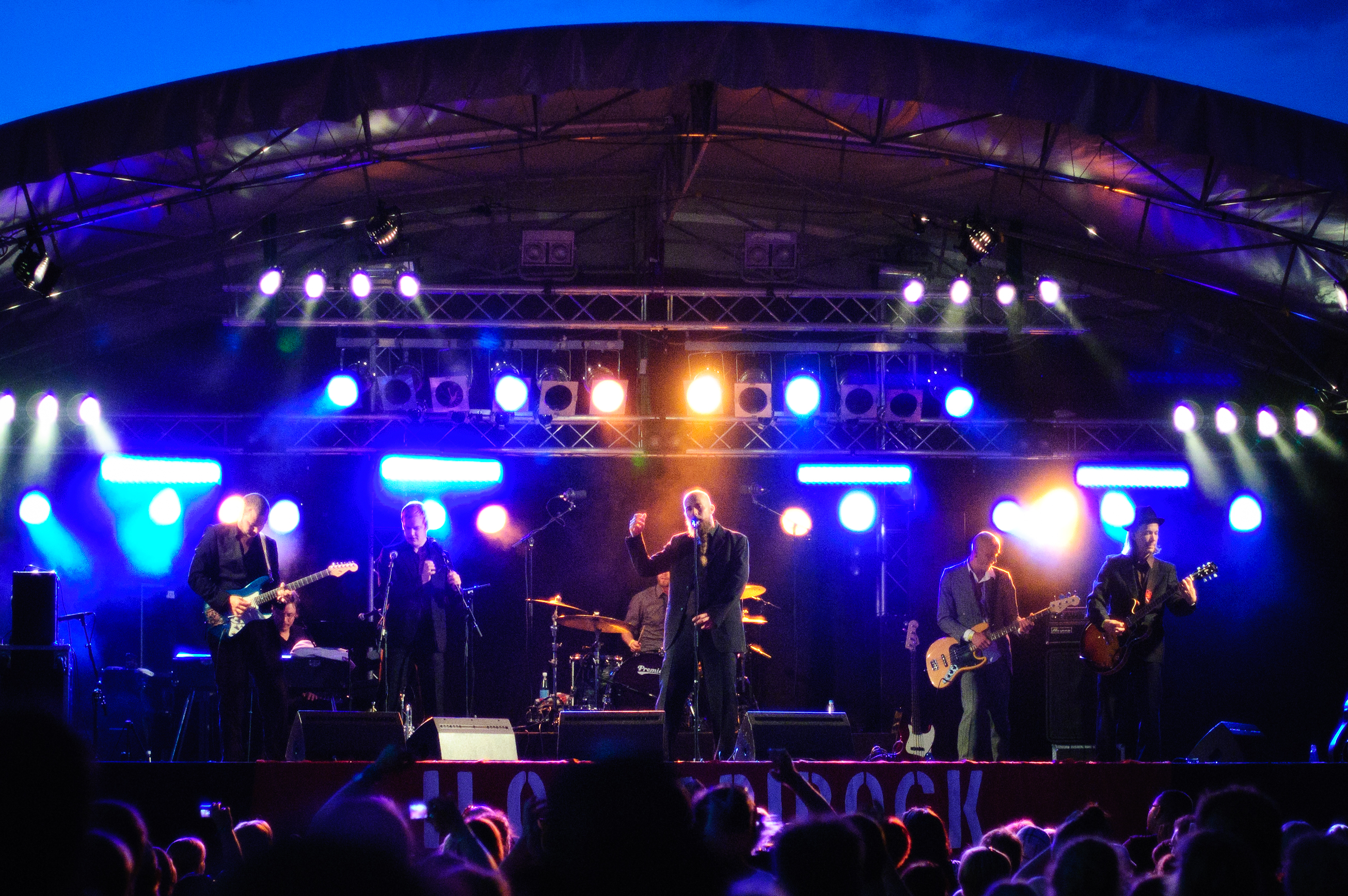
- Vesterinen Yhtyeineen (2010)

Background information
- Origin: Uusimaa, Finland
- Genres: Indie pop
- Years active: 2009–present
- Label: Universal Music
- Members: Tero Vesterinen; Petri Kivimäki; Mikko Enqvist; Markus Piha; Janne Riionheimo; Teemu Jokinen
- Website: vesterinenyhtyeineen.fi

Vesterinen Yhtyeineen is a Finnish indie pop group made up of six members with Tero Vesterinen as main vocalist. They are signed to Universal Music Finland. The debut album of the band, Jönköping, was released on 26 August 2009 with single "Mitä tapahtui Hokkasen Timolle" getting heavy airplay. The band was nominated for Best Newcomer during Emma awards in 2009.

== Members ==
- Tero Vesterinen – singer
- Petri Kivimäki – guitar
- Mikko Enqvist – guitar
- Markus Piha – bass
- Janne Riionheimo – keyboards
- Teemu Jokinen – drums

== Discography ==
=== Albums ===
Year	Album	Peak positions
Year	Album	FIN
2009	Jönköping	12
2011	Erikoismiehen jäähyväiset	12
2013	Tiedän miltä tuntuu	7
2016	Kirottu yksinäisyys	12
2017	Paviaani-Parhaat 2009–2017	17
2019	Faaraoiden aika	7
2021	Meissä asuu elämä	2
2023	Hetken ikuinen	3
2024	Hetken, ikuisesti, elävänä!	22
2026	Liian hiljaista	4
