= Farmakon (band) =

Finnish progressive death metal band

- Origin: Tampere, Finland
- Genre: Progressive death metal
- Years active: 2001−2010
- Label: Alterstream Records
- Past members: Marko Eskola; Toni Salminen; Pekka Kauppila; Matti Auerkallio; Lassi Paunonen; Riku Airisto
- Website: www.farmakonband.com/

Farmakon was a Finnish progressive death metal band formed in 2001. The band consisted of Toni Salminen (guitarist/vocalist), Marko Eskola (vocalist) and Pekka Kauppila (bass guitarist). The band released two studio albums. The band used clean and growling vocals and incorporated jazz and funk into their music.

Farmakon's first album, A Warm Glimpse, was released in 2003. The opening track, "Loosely of Ameobas", was included on Earache's "Metal: A Headbanger's Companion II" compilation.

Robin, the band's second album, was released on February 21, 2007, and in America on April 29, 2008. The album was awarded 10th place in the Metal Storm ranking of the top death metal albums of 2007.

In 2007, Farmakon started to work on material for a new album, tentatively titled Syan. The band announced that former drummer Riku Airisto had agreed to play on the album after Matti Auerkallio's departure.

In September 2010, the band announced on their message board that it had split up. Syan was never released.

== Band members ==
Source: Farmakon website

- Marko Eskola − vocals
- Toni Salminen − guitar, vocals
- Pekka Kauppila − bass guitar

=== Former band members ===
- Matti Auerkallio - drums (2004–2007)
- Lassi Paunonen - guitars (2001–2007)
- Riku Airisto - drums (2001–2003)

== Discography ==
- A Warm Glimpse (2003)
- Robin (2007)
