= Tsuumi =

Finnish dance theater

Tsuumi Dance Theatre is a Finnish dance theatre combining folk dance to contemporary dance and theatre. Its members are professional dancers and musicians. The group says that they have done for folk dance what Värttinä did for folk music: "updated the tradition, infused it with the energy and the coarse power of expression that folklore has and drug it out of its dusty archives, making it accessible to the people and letting them enjoy it."

The group's artistic directors are Reetta-Kaisa Iles and Tuomas Juntunen.

Tsuumi was founded in 1998. The dance group has staged more than 40 premières and performed on numerous Finnish and foreign stages.

== Tsuumi in Eurovision ==
Tsuumi performed at the intermission of the Eurovision Song Contest 2007's semifinal. Matti Paloniemi, who also scripted the piece with Tiina Puumalainen, was responsible for choreographing and directing the performance. Hannu Kella composed the music and served as conductor. The performance was based on the Kalevala, Finland's epic tale, and explored Finland's roots in depth.

== Tsuumi Sound System ==
Tsuumi Sound System is responsible for Tsuumi's music. The group is led by Hannu Kella. It travels the world as its own group, too. The band has published 7 albums: Kesä Tanssii (1999), Risteys (2000), Avoin Kenttä (2002), Rajaton Tapaus (2004), Hotas (2007), Growing Up (2009), Floating Letters(2013) and Blinking Light (2018).
