= Bob Malmström =

Finnish hardcore punk band

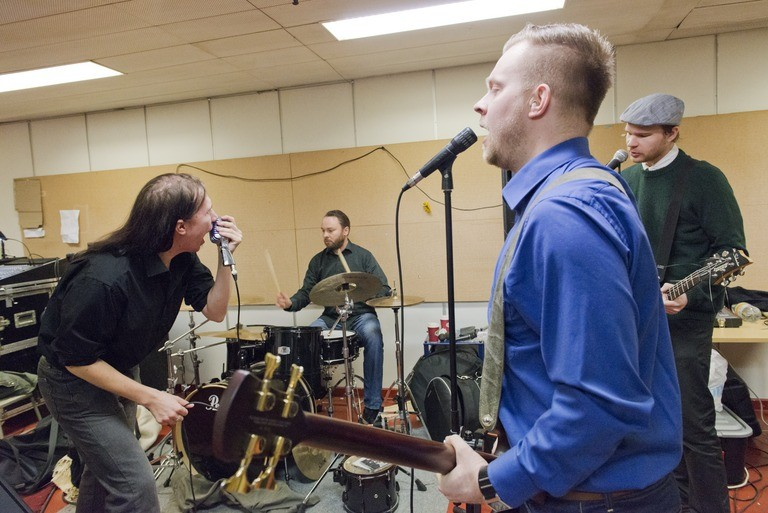
- Rehearsals in 2013.

Background information
- Origin: Espoo, Finland
- Genres: Hardcore punk, thrash metal
- Years active: 2010–present
- Labels: Spinefarm Records (2011), Playground Music Scandinavia (2013–)
- Members: Carolus Aminoff; Olof Palmén; Carl Johan Langenskiöld; Wilhelm Wahlroos
- Website: http://www.bobmalmstrom.com/

Bob Malmström is a Finland-Swedish hardcore punk band from Helsinki. The band claims to have "the right kinds of values that emphasizes and contemptuous of the poor ‘porvaricore’, which breaks the traditional punk-left alignment pattern". The members are Carolus Aminoff, Olof Palmén, Carl Johan Langenskiöld, and Wilhelm Wahlroos.

The band released their debut album Tala svenska eller dö in 2011. Their second album, Punkens framtid, was released on 19 April 2013.

== Discography ==
- Vi är bättre än ni (2010, EP, self-released)
- Välj Malmström (2011, EP, self-released)
- Tala svenska eller dö (2011, Spinefarm Records)
- Punkens framtid (2013, Playground Music)
- Kejsarsnitt (2015, EP, Playground)
- Vi kommer i krig (2016, Playground)
- Segla med satan (2022, EP)
