= Vilddas =

Finnish band

Vilddas is a band that was formed in Tampere, Finland in 1997 by Annukka Hirvasvuopio, Mikko Vanhasalo and Marko Jouste. They play Sámi music, but their instrument selection consist of different instruments from many different cultures like oud and kemence. Vilddas had its first concert on November 26, 1997 in Tampere at Telakka.

== Discography ==
=== Háliidan 2003 ===
1. Háliidan
2. Vuolgge Fárrui
3. Boađan Du Lusa
4. Go Moai Leimme Mánat
5. Vilges Suola
6. Moaresluohti
7. Lasse-ádjáluohti
8. Ohcejohka
9. Dánses Lille Sárá
10. Dolla
11. Dola Mun Cahkkehan
12. Irggástallan

=== Single 2002 ===
1. Go Moai Leimme Mánat
2. Ohcejohka
3. Go Moai Leimme Mánat (radio edit)

=== Vilddas 2002 ===
1. Savkalanlávlla
2. Jiekŋaáhpi
3. Oarreluohti - Nanne Luohti
4. Beaivvážis Šaddet Beaivvit
5. Dán Ija
6. Biegga
7. Hirvas-Niila Luohti
8. Ráfi
9. Pauanne
10. Guhtur-Ándde-Reijo
11. Eadni Lávlu
12. Báze Dearvan

=== Single 2000 ===
1. Biegga
2. Pauanne
3. Moarseluohti

== Line-up ==
- Annukka Hirvasvuopio, soloist
- Marko Jouste
- Mikko Vanhasalo, plays the clarinet, saxophone, ney, etc.
- Ari Isotalo
- Karo Sampela, drums
- Risto Blomster
