= Seminaarinmäen mieslaulajat =

Finnish male choir

Seminaarimäen Mieslaulajat
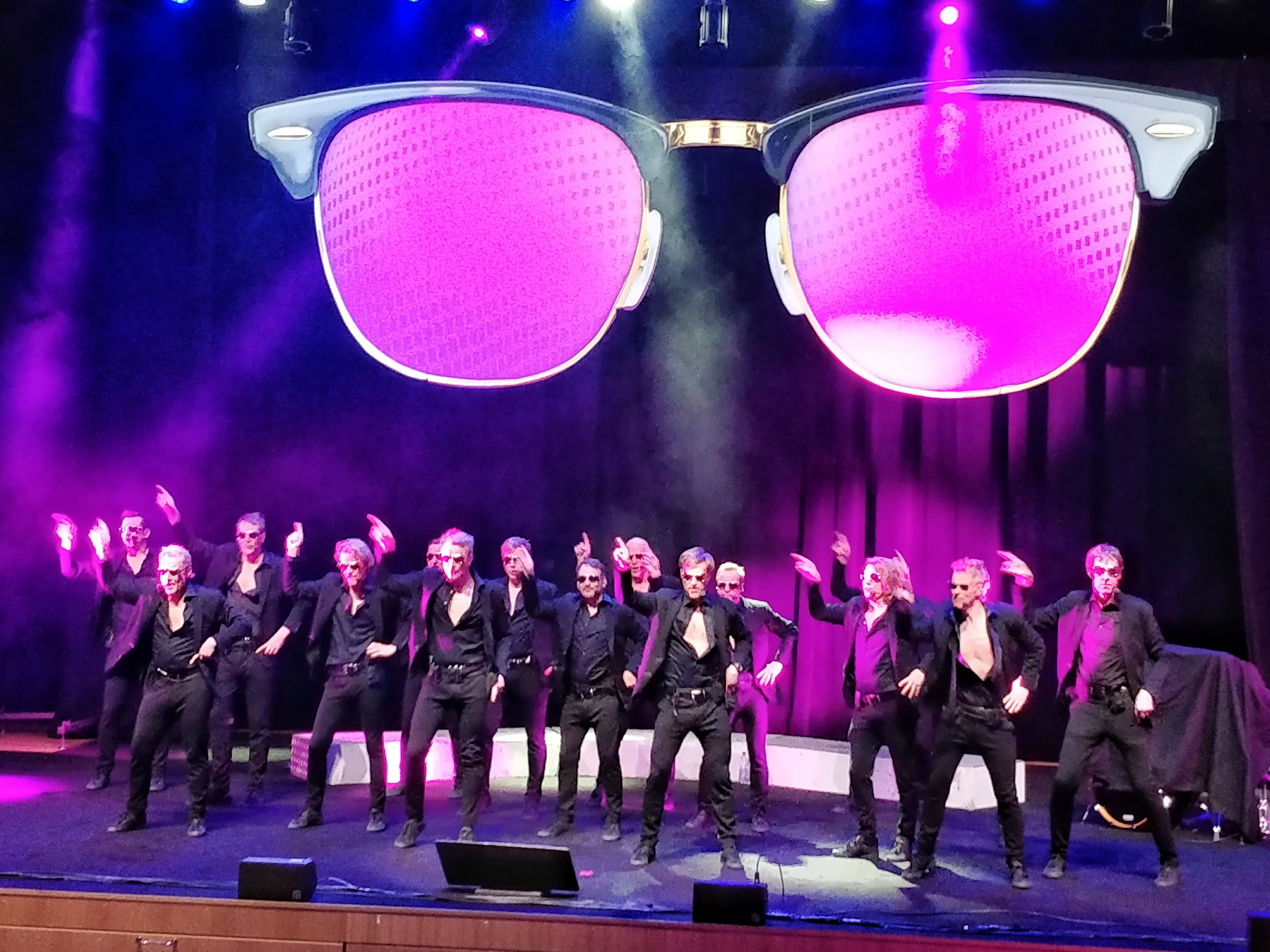
- Semmarit performing in Klaukkala in 2018

Background information
- Also known as: Semmarit
- Origin: Jyväskylä, Finland
- Genres: Men's chorus
- Years active: 1989–present
- Labels: Musiikkituotanto Ukkokiekuu Oy
- Website: semmarit.fi

Seminaarinmäen mieslaulajat (literally translated as "Men's Choir of Seminaarinmäki"), better known as Semmarit, is a male choir from Jyväskylä, Finland. Formed in 1989, the group is known for singing non-traditional choir music heavily influenced by rock and roll and pop music. Imaginative props and comedic choreography are also an integral part of their shows. Furthermore, the singers are known to wear black suits, but occasionally, unusual clothing such as green tights may be used as part of the show.

All songs are composed and regularly polled amongst the group members. Although a primarily vocal-only arrangement, the songs occasionally have an instrumental accompaniment. Instruments the group has used include the djembe, the didgeridoo, the kazoo, the bagpipes, a toilet lid, a zipper in the fly of their trousers, and water-filled beer bottles to imitate a pan flute. Some group members also physically use their colleagues as air guitars for playing "instrumental" solos.

The choir uses a system of wireless microphones, known as headsets, which allows for the use of dramatic elements and free movement around the stage. Semmarit also perform acoustically, even though amplified sound have become an essential part of shows since the early up-and-coming years.

Most of the singers are academically trained, singing non-professionally. The group doesn't perform as often as other popular music groups might; since the members are men with day jobs, for whom the choir is a lifestyle and a side job. Most concerts take place on annual tours.

Seminaarinmäen mieslaulajat have toured in Finland, Estonia, Sweden, Germany, Switzerland, Portugal, Scotland, the United States, Canada, and China. They have also had their own TV shows and number one selling albums in Finland.

== Personnel ==
Their lineup has changed over the years and currently the group consists of 17 singers and conductor Reima Viitala. However, their lighting and sound technicians are so essential to the shows that they are also considered to be members of the group.

- Choir leader: Reima Viitala
- 1st Tenors: Turkka Saarikoski, Mikko Miettinen, Pasi Pohjola, and Pasi "Paatu" Niemelä
- 2nd Tenors: Janne Kettunen, Jussi Oksala, Juha "Julle" Ikola, and Hannu Sompinmäki
- 1st Bass: Markus Paananen, Juha "Juffe" Rouvala, Hannu Moilanen, and Kari-Pekka Kaskismaa
- 2nd Bass: Juho-Kusti "Uski" Väätäinen, Jyrki Vihriälä, Joel Linna, Markus Kinnunen, and Tuomas Jauhiainen.
- Crew: Timo Ilmonen, Risto Ronkainen, and Tuomas Käppi.

Other ex-group members who no longer perform: Tuomo Rannankari (1st tenor), Pertti "Pepe" Mäki-Välkkilä (1st tenor), Mikko Huttunen (2nd tenor), Sakari Antila (2nd tenor), Heikki Luumi (1st bass), Ari Anttila (2nd bass), and Seppo Siika-Aho (2nd bass).

== History ==
Seminaarinmäen mieslaulajat was founded in the autumn of 1989. A group of students, of the University of Jyväskylä, decided to establish a different kind of male choir, to produce their own type of music. In the early years, there was a lot of turnover in the choir.

Semmarit performed for the first time in 1989 at the University of Jyväskylä. The following spring, the choir organized its first concert. By the autumn of 1991, they had put together a full concert consisting entirely of self-produced songs, from which four tracks were later recorded for the Lepoasento (Resting Position) EP. 500 copies of the vinyl were pressed, becoming the first product produced by Semmarit; which, is no longer available for sale. Semmarit also made their first TV appearance, in 1992, on the "Kotimaan katsaus" program.

The choir performed an award-winning concert in 1993 at Tampereen Sävel. Around the same time, the choir's lineup stabilized, and the release of its first full-length album was ahead. The album Kuka on tuo mies (Who Is That Man) was released in October 1993, and was well received, with the song "Tekisi mieleni lentoon" ("I feel like flying") winning Radio Suomi's "Jymylevy" vote.

In the spring of 1995, the second full-length album Ruohonjuuritasolla (Down-to-Earth) was released, followed by Sampo Texas in the fall of 1996. In 1996–1997, they embarked on a sold-out tour in Finland with a symphony orchestra conducted by Atso Almila. The fourth live album Ukkokiekuu (Mancrow) was released in fall of 1998.

The choir celebrated its tenth anniversary in 1999 and toured Finland presenting a retrospective program. In 2000, four new members joined the choir. The album Hakkaan sun ovee (Beating Your Door) was released in the spring of 2001.

Semmarit are releasing a new studio album, Siivousmusaa (Cleaning Music), and a book, 25 ensimmäistä vuotta (First 25 Years), in 2025. They will also have their 35th anniversary tour later in the year.

== Discography ==
Semmarit has released 14 CD albums, two of which have hit #1 on the Finnish Billboard chart, and two DVD albums. They have also published five singles and two EP's, and one songbook.

Albums

- Kuka on tuo mies (Who Is That Man) (1993)
- Ruohonjuuritasolla (Down-to-Earth) (1995)
- Sampo Texas (1996)
- Ukkokiekuu (Mancrow) (1998)
- Hakkaan sun ovee (Beating Your Door) (2001)
- Wunderbaum (2004)
- Laulut ja tarinat (Songs and Stories) (2007)
- 20 - Kokoelma (20-year collection) (2009)
- Suuntaamme avaruuteen - Live (Heading Into Space - Live) (2009)
- Picchu Macho (2013)
- Life Is a Highway (2014)
- Hullun hommaa (Crazy Stuff) (2016)
- Rakastan sua (Love You) (2019)
- Siivousmusaa (Cleaning Music) (2025)

DVD's

- Filminauhaa (Filmreel) (DVD, 2005)
- Suuntaamme avaruuteen (Heading Into Space) (DVD, 2011)

Singles & EP's

- Lepoasento (Resting Position) (EP, 1992)
- Kaksi kättä hississä (Two Hands In The Elevator) (EP, 1996)
- Pant Legs Flap Around (Single, 2000)
- Taina (Single, 2004)
- Häivähdys unelmaa (Glimpse of a Dream) (Single, 2007)
- Pienet linnut (Small Birds) (Single, 2007)
- Pienenmuotoinen pikku joulukalenteri (Small-Sized Little Advent Calendar) (Single, 2012)

Misc.

- Laulukirja: 1989-2014 (Songbook: 1989-2014) (Book, 2014)
- Semmarit - 35 ensimmäistä vuotta (Semmarit - First 35 Years) (Book, 2025)
