= Falchion (band) =

Finnish heavy metal/death metal band

- Origin: Lahti, Finland
- Genres: Melodic death metal Folk metal
- Years active: 2002−2009
- Labels: Massacre; World Chaos
- Past members: Juho Kauppinen; Jani Laine; Seppo Tiaskorpi; Teemu Peltonen; Matti Johansson; Janne Kielinen; Miika Tulimäki; Toni Tieaho
- Website: www.falchionband.com

Falchion was a Finnish heavy metal/death metal band formed in 2002. Their debut album, Legacy of Heathens, was released in 2005. Vocalist and lead guitarist Juho Kauppinen and drummer Matti Johansson formerly performed with Finnish folk metal group Korpiklaani, as the accordion player and drummer, respectively, before Juho's departure in 2013, and Matti's departure in 2019. The band dissolved in 2009.

On September 12, 2008, the band released its third studio album, Chronicles of the Death, through Massacre Records.

== Band members ==
=== Final lineup ===
- Juho Kauppinen − unclean vocals, lead guitar, accordion (2002-2009)
- Matti Johansson - drums (2005-2009)
- Janne Kielinen - bass (2005-2009)
- Toni Tieaho − rhythm guitar (2008-2009)

=== Former ===
- Jani Laine - rhythm guitar (2002-2003, 2003-2004, 2004-2005)
- Seppo Tiaskorpi - bass (2002-2005)
- Teemu Peltonen - drums (2003-2005)
- Sami Heinonen - rhythm guitar (2003, 2004)
- Miikka Tulimäki - rhythm guitar (2005-2008)
- Joonas Simonen - keyboards (2002-2003)
- Sampsa Savijärvi - rhythm guitar, clean vocals (2006)

== Discography ==
- 2003 - Glory of the Sword (EP)
- 2005 - Legacy of Heathens
- 2008 - Chronicles of the Dead
