= Topmost =

Finnish rock band

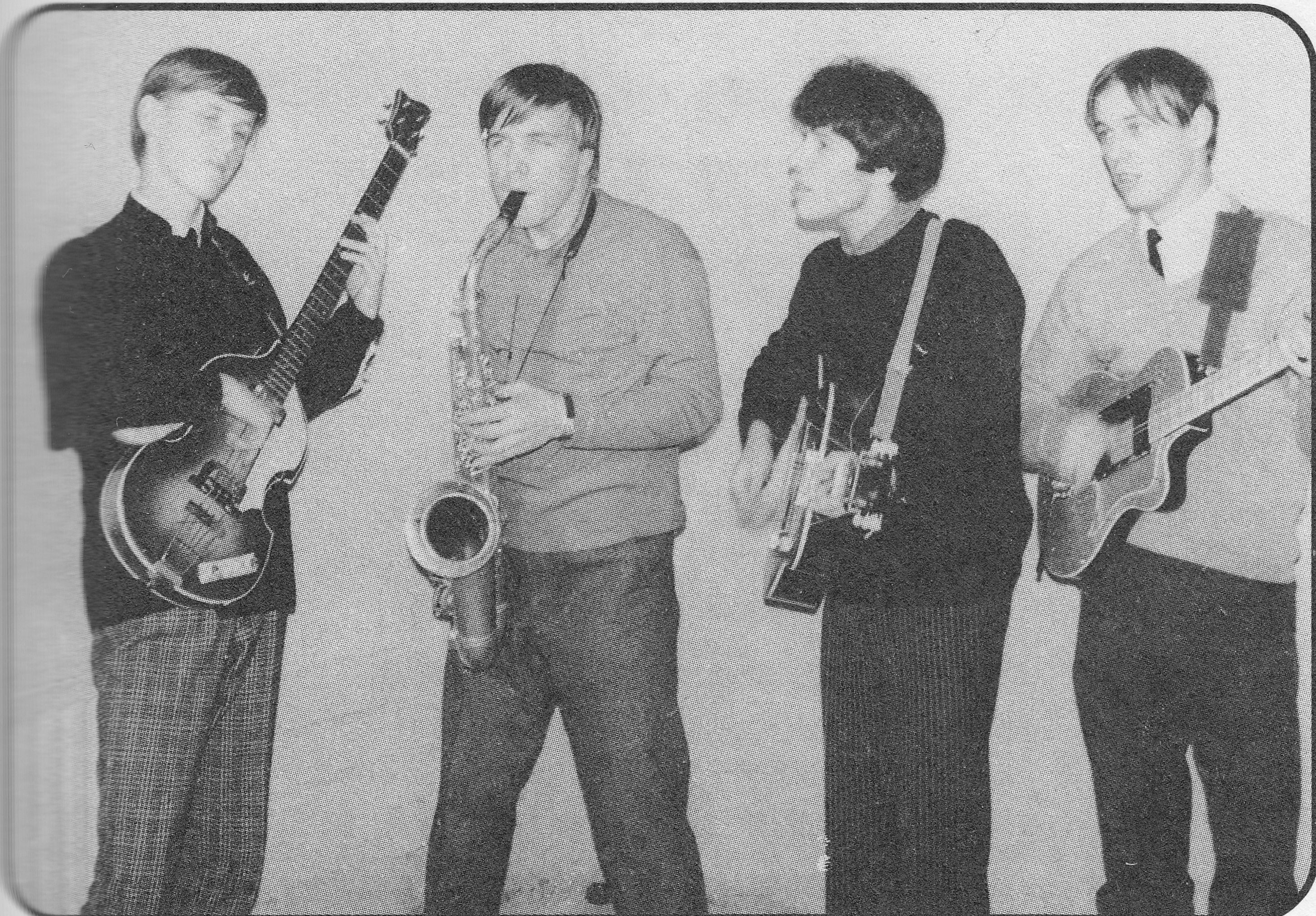
The group in 1964

Topmost was a Finnish rock band founded in 1964, becoming the most popular band in Finland in 1967. Its members were Heimo "Holle" Holopainen (bass guitar, background vocals), Kristian "Kisu" Jernström (drums, background vocals), Vasilij "Gugi" Kokljuschkin (vocals), Eero Lupari (guitar, background vocals), Harri Saksala (vocals, saxophone), Arto "Poku" Tarkkonen (keyboards).

The band's most popular hits were Finnish translations of English language songs: "Näen mustaa vain" ("Black Is Black" by Los Bravos), "Merisairaat kasvot" ("A Whiter Shade of Pale" by Procol Harum) and "Hän sinut jättää" ("Two Kinds of Lovers" by The Gibsons).

Topmost split in 1968. Holopainen, Lupari and Saksala continued in the band Apollo.

== Singles discography ==
- The In Crowd / Alone And Forsaken (1966)
- Näen mustaa vain / "Eleanor Rigby" (1966)
- Two Kinds Of Lovers / Candy Girl (1967)
- Hän sinut jättää / Aivan ehdoton (1967)
- Merisairaat kasvot / 8. kesäkuuta (1967)
- Meni remonttiin / Maailman tunsin muuttuvan (1968)

== Albums discography ==
- Topmost (1968)
- Topmost Collection (LP, 1988)
- Topmost Collection (CD, 2001)
