= Sinamore =

Finnish gothic metal band

- Origin: Hamina, Finland
- Genres: Gothic metal
- Years active: 1998–2009
- Labels: Napalm Records
- Members: Mikko Heikkilä; Jarno Uski; Sami Hauru; Miika Hostikka

Sinamore was a Finnish gothic metal band from Hamina. Sinamore released their first album A New Day in January 2006. This was followed by a second album Seven Sins a Second the following year. This would be their final release before the band's break-up.

== Current members ==
- Mikko Heikkilä - Vocals, guitar
- Jarno Uski - Bass
- Sami Hauru - Guitar
- Miika Hostikka - Drums

== Discography ==
=== Studio albums ===
- A New Day (2006)
- Seven Sins a Second (2007)

=== Demos ===
- Follow Into the Cry (2004)

=== Videos ===
- "Darkness of Day" (2006)
- "Fallen" (2006)
- "Better Alone" (2007)
