= Aknestik =

Finnish guitar pop band

Aknestik was a Finnish guitar pop band from Haukipudas in Northern Ostrobothnia. They released seven albums and became perhaps best known for the songs Suomirokkia (Finnish rock, 1996), Toukokuussa (At May, 1988) and Jokapäivä (Everyday, 1994) .

== Members ==
- Jukka Takalo (vocals, 1984–2002; bass, 1984–1998)
- Kai Latvalehto (guitar and backing vocals, 1984–2002)
- Mikko Rautalin (drums and backing vocals, 1988–2002)
- Vesa Kupila (guitar and backing vocals, 1988–2002)
- Maako Härönen (bass, 1998–2002)

== Discography ==
=== Albums ===
- Ojat on rajat (1991)
- Valassaaret (1993)
- Onni (1994)
- Säätiedotuksia merenkulkijoille (1996)
- Aallonmurtaja (1998)
- Tulevaisuus on myöhemmin (1999)
- Vedenpaisumus (2001)

=== Compilations ===
- Hittejä, piisejä ja hittipiisejä (1997)
- Hitit – Suomirokkia ja suuria tunteita (2000)
- Sata vuotta kaivossa – Aknestikin suurimmat hitit (2006)
- Unohtumattomat takapuolet 1 (1990–1996) (2011)
- Unohtumattomat takapuolet – B-puolia ja muita harvinaisuuksia (2012)

=== EPs ===
- Suomen pystykorvan kadonnut onni (EP, 1990)
- Syvät veet (EP, 1992)

=== DVD ===
- Aikakirjat DVD (2002)
