= Jormas =

Finnish band

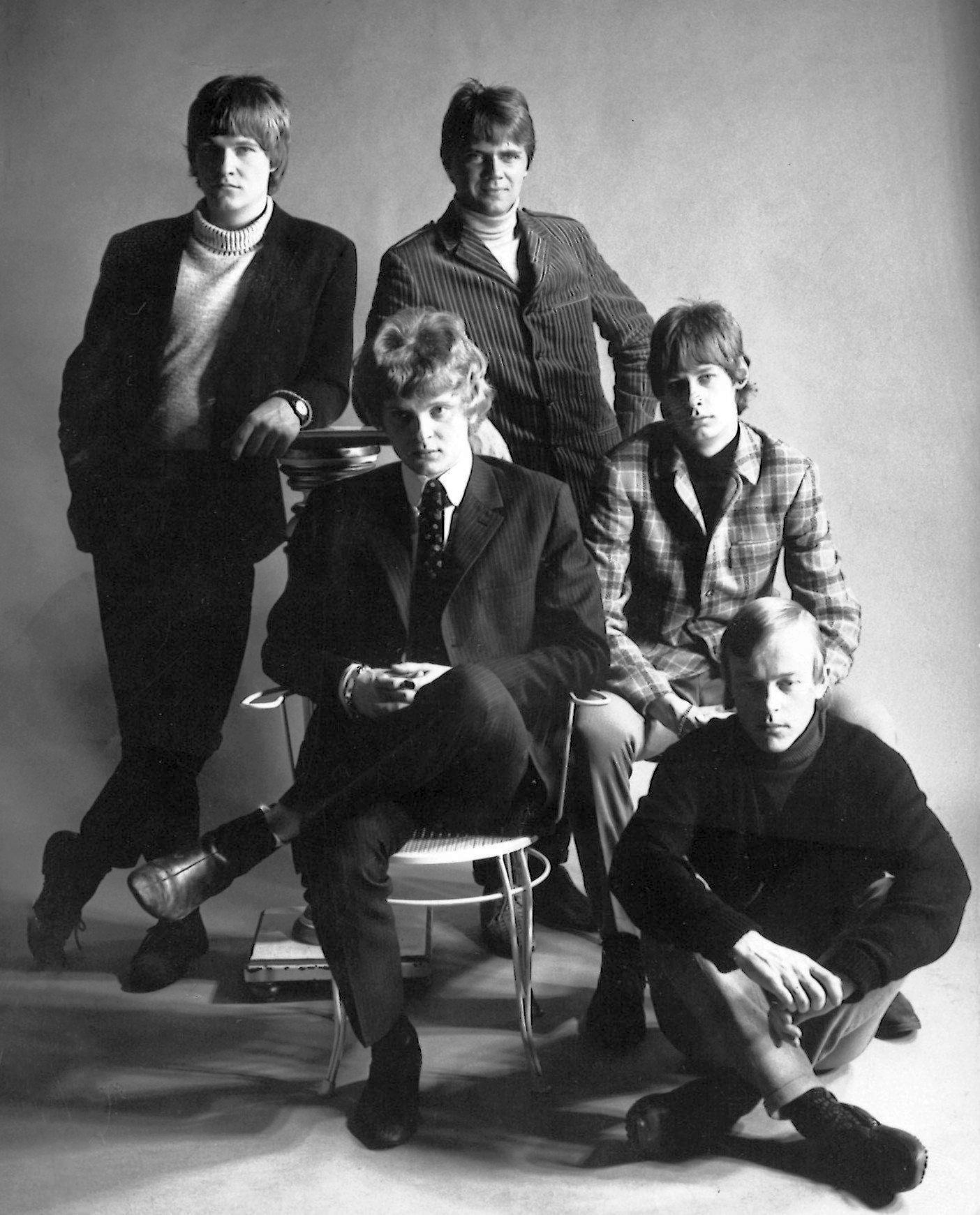
Jormas in 1966: Raoul Wikström, Christer Bergholm, Pepe Willberg, Hasse Walli ja Kurt Mattson.

Jormas was a Finnish pop band in the 1960s. They had previously appeared as the Beatmakers, but were renamed by their manager Jorma Weneskoski. They were active from 1965 - 1968. Line up in 1965 was Raul Wikström (vocals), Pepe Willberg (vocals, guitar), Seppo Keurulainen (lead guitar).

== Singles discography ==
- "Mr. Tambourine Man" / New Orleans (1965)
- The Locomotion / Go Now (1965)
- Please Don't Go / Days, Nights (1966)
- Please, Please, Please / Go Now (1966)
- Saat miehen kyyneliin / California Dreamin' (1966)
- Taivas vain tietää / Mennä voit (1966)
- Rööperiin / Kuin yö (1967)
- Luokses palaan taas / Riski Riitta (1967)
- Kenties, kenties / Alusta mä kaiken alkaisin (1968)
- Tomorrow Is Here / Goin' Out Of My Head / Can't Take My Eyes Of You (1968)
- Se Onnistuu / Elää (1968)

== Albums discography ==
- Jormas (1966)
- Sincerely! (1968)
- Saat miehen Rööperiin (a compilation, 2001)
