= Winterborn (band) =

Finnish heavy metal band

- Origin: Kokkola, Finland
- Genres: Heavy metal, power metal
- Years active: 2004–present
- Labels: Marquee/Avalon; Massacre Records

Winterborn is a Finnish heavy metal band formed in December 2004 after playing cover shows as Mean Machine from Spring 2003.

Their first album Cold Reality was released in 2006 through Massacre Records. The same year they played various shows in Southern and Western Europe with Doro and Benedictum. Their second album Farewell to Saints, was released in 2008 by the Massacre Records.

== Members ==
- Teemu Koskela – vocals (2004–)
- Pasi Vapola – guitar and backing vocals (2004–)
- Antti Hokkala – guitar and backing vocals (2008–)
- Jukka Hänninen – keyboards and backing vocals (2004–)
- Pasi Kauppinen – bass and backing vocals (2007–)
- Lauri Bexar – drums (2008–2011, 2011–present)

=== Former members ===
- Rami Heikkilä – drums (2004–2008)
- Janne "Saimis" Suvanto – bass (2004–2007)

== Discography ==
Albums

- Cold Reality (2006)
- Farewell to Saints (Japan 2008, elsewhere 2009)

Singles

- "Wildheart" (2006)
