= Penniless (band) =

Finnish rock band

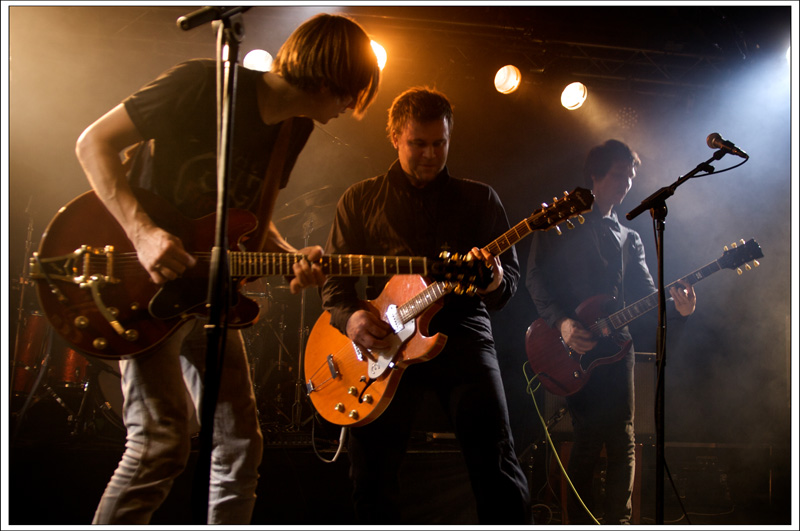

Background information
- Also known as: Penniless People of Bulgaria
- Origin: Nakkila, Finland
- Genres: Alternative rock; indie rock; power pop
- Years active: 1988–
- Labels: Poko Rekords, Penni Records, A Westside Fabrication, Soit se silti
- Members: Lasse Alisaari; Pekka Alisaari; Kimmo Kurittu; Mikko Pere; Ossi Alisaari
- Past members: Timo Pääkkö

Penniless (previously Penniless People of Bulgaria) is a rock band, formed in Nakkila, Finland in 1988. As of June 2019, Penniless has released ten studio albums (the first four as Penniless People of Bulgaria), as well as nineteen singles/EPs. Penniless is currently signed to Tampere-based label Soit se silti.

== Career ==
Despite having received mainly favourable reviews, Penniless has enjoyed moderate commercial success. The Adam's Apple Pie single spent 13 weeks on Finnish public radio station Radiomafia's playlist in 2001. The band reached The Official Finnish Charts for the first time ever in 2010 with the A Cab to the City album, which spent one week at No. 30 on the Official Finnish Albums Chart.

In 1998, Penniless covered Eva Dahlgren's song Sommarbarn for the Yle X3M radio station's compilation album entitled Extrema Sommarhits Volume 1. The song was also released on the Cyberhand CD EP.

Penniless has toured mainly in its native Finland, but the band has also supported American band Mucky Pup on their European tour in 1996 and performed at the 1998 Roskilde Festival in Denmark. Penniless has performed several times at the Swedish Trästockfestivalen, an annual free festival in Skellefteå, founded and arranged by Joakim Wallström. Wallström is also the founder of Penniless' long-time record label A Westside Fabrication.

== Musical style and influences ==
Finnish monthly music magazine Soundi has described Penniless’ music as "beautiful and catchy melodies, stellar guitars and a matching 'tongue in cheek' attitude". PopMatters highlighted Penniless' "artful employment of every indie trick and guitar hook in the book"., while Nöjesguiden praised the band's "unusually distinctive talent for coming up with great refrains", but rued its "lack of individuality in an atonal jungle of similar bands".

Music critics have compared Penniless to a number of mostly American rock bands, including Pixies, Hüsker Dü, Weezer and Nirvana. Penniless guitarist, vocalist and main songwriter Ossi Alisaari has cited The Who and Sonic Youth among his influences.

== Side projects ==
Outside Penniless, Ossi Alisaari sings and plays guitar in the band Salaliitto. Kimmo Kurittu is the bass player of Maj Karma. Pekka Alisaari has produced albums for Finnish acts Euforia and Markus Perttula.

== Band members ==
=== Current members ===
- Lasse Alisaari – drums (1988–)
- Pekka Alisaari – guitar (1988–), vocals (1991–)
- Kimmo Kurittu – bass (1988–)
- Mikko Pere – guitar (1991–)
- Ossi Alisaari – vocals, guitar (1997–)

=== Past members ===
- Timo Pääkkö – vocals, guitar (1988–1991)

== Discography ==
=== Albums ===
- Sunshine Show (1990, Poko Rekords, POKOCD 53/PÄLP 112)
- Cake (1993, Penni Records, PENNI-CD-1)
- Mould (1994, Penni Records, PENNI-CD-2; A West Side Fabrication, WeCD 082; Alternation/Intercord Record Service, IRS CD 972.520; Pioneer (Japan, 1995), PICP-1061)
- Velocity (1996, Penni Records, PENNI-CD-3; A West Side Fabrication, WeCD 115; Bullet Proof Records/Intercord Record Service, IRS 993.617; Ichiban/Altered Records (USA), ALT 3110–2)
- Joe (1998, A West Side Fabrication, WeCD 155)
- Anola (2001, A West Side Fabrication, WeCD 183; UlfTone Music (Germany), UTCD 053)
- All Good Things Come To Those Who Wait (2004, A West Side Fabrication, WeCD 214)
- The Attraction (2007, A West Side Fabrication, WeCD 242)
- A Cab to the city (2010, A West Side Fabrication, WeCD 283)
- Rows Of Houses (2013, A West Side Fabrication, WECD 345)
- X (2018, Soit Se Silti, SOIT063)
- Ego Catastrophe (2024, Soit Se Silti)

=== Singles and EPs ===
- Penniless People of Bulgaria (Mini-LP, 1989, Poko Rekords, FORMULA 14)
- My Life Is Goin’ Down (Vinyl 7", 1990, Poko Rekords, PIS 271)
- Winterland (Vinyl 7", 1991, Poko Rekords, PIS 297)
- Motorhead (CD Single, 1996, A West Side Fabrication, WeCD 113)
- Velocity (CD single, 1996, Intercord/Bullet Proof Records, INT 825.092)
- Velocity/Weightless (Vinyl 7"/CD single, 1996, Ichiban/Altered Records, 96-378-1/CD-378-2)
- Avalanche (CD single, 1998, A West Side Fabrication, WeCD 154)
- Cyberhand (CD EP, 1998, A West Side Fabrication, WeCD 161)
- Beautiful vs. Cage (CD single, 1999, A West Side Fabrication, WeCD 165)
- Adam's Apple Pie (CD single, 2001, A West Side Fabrication, WeCD 182)
- Save (Promo CD single, 2001, A West Side Fabrication, WeCD 189)
- Imbecile (CD single, 2001, A West Side Fabrication, WeCD 194)
- Amen (Promo CD single, 2004, A West Side Fabrication, WeCD 212)
- Story of A Punk (CD single, 2004, A West Side Fabrication WeCD 220)
- Messenger (MP3 single/Promo CD single, 2007, A West Side Fabrication WeCD 241)
- City Birds/Sadderday (ruler mix) (MP3 single/Promo CD single, 2007, A West Side Fabrication WeCD 249)
- Brothers (MP3 single, 2010, A West Side Fabrication, WeCD 278)
- Panic (Radio edit) (MP3 single, 2011, A West Side Fabrication, WeCD 292)
- My Imaginary Friends (MP3 single, 2013, A West Side Fabrication, WeCD 345)
- The Great Marquis (digital single, 2018, Soit Se Silti, SOIT037)
- Anthem for the Suckers (digital single, 2018, Soit Se Silti, SOIT060)
- Far Away Country (digital single, 2018, Soit Se Silti, SOIT065)
- Actor (digital single, 2022, Soit Se Silti, SOIT183)
- The Ones Behind the Lobotomy (2023, Soit Se Silti)
- 44 (2023, Soit Se Silti)
