= Feiled =

Finnish band

Feiled is a Finnish gothic rock band. Frontman Anton Laurila formed the band in 2001. Its name is a misspelling of the word "failed". The band was first noticed in 2002, after releasing their first demo, "Feiled".

After the release of their second song, "Lost EP", a new promo was released and "Feiled" was signed to Poko Rekords. Soon after, the band started working on a full-length album. In 2005 they released the album Midnight Poems followed by a music video for the song "Lost".

Their second album, Testify, produced by Nick Triana, was released early in 2007. The single "Lycanthropy" rose to the top of the Finnish charts and remains the band's highest charted release.

== Members ==
- Anton Laurila – vocals. Before starting Feiled he was a drummer who played in genres such as fusion, jazz, and gospel.

=== 2004–2006 ===
- Anton Laurila – vocals
- Masi Hukari – guitars
- Panu – bass
- Henri – guitars
- Hank – drums

=== 2006–2007 ===
- Anton Laurila – vocals
- Miika Partala – guitar
- Mikko Tuliniemi – guitar
- Jacob Alexander Grajewski – bass
- Janne-Jussi Kontoniemi – drums

== Faulty Messenger ==
After announcing the news of the breakup of Feiled at the end of 2007, Laurila worked with a new band called Faulty Messenger. Anton Laurila was in the process of recording a new studio album.

- Anton Laurila – vocals, piano
- Masi Hukari – guitar
- Tommi Huuskonen – bass
- Markus Malin – drums

== Discography ==
=== Albums ===
- Midnight Poems (2005)
- Testify (2007)

=== Singles ===
- "Feiled" demo (2002)
- "Lost EP" (2003)
- "Promo" (2004)
- "The Great Escape" (2005)
- "Lost" (2005)
- "Dive" (10/5/05)
- "Just Like Heaven" (2006)
- "Lycanthropy" (2007)
- "Invincible" (2007)
