= Wiidakko =

Finnish indie rock band

- Origin: Finland
- Genres: indie rock, alternative rock
- Years active: 2003–present
- Labels: Perfection Records; EMI Finland; Fresh Tunes Finland
- Members: Ilkka Hildén; Markus Kujawa; Juho Talja; Tuomo Tähtinen; Jyri Uurtimo
- Website: www.wiidakko.com

Wiidakko are a Finnish indie rock band that was formed in Lahti, Finland in 2003. The group has released three studio albums Uusi järjestys (2006), Asiat joita et voi koskaan saavuttaa (2008) and Wiidakko (2011).

Wiidakko made their breakthrough in an annual band contest Ääni ja Vimma (Sound and Fury) in 2004. Their first single reached #7 in the Finnish Charts in February 2006. All of their three albums have been Albums of the Week on the national YleX radio station.

== Discography ==
=== Albums ===
- Uusi järjestys (2006 Parlophone)
- Asiat joita et voi koskaan saavuttaa (2008 Parlophone)
- Wiidakko (2011)

=== Singles ===
- 980 ongelmaa (2006)
- Thalarctos maritimus (2006)
- Alaikäinen (2006)
- Niin (2007)
- Jokainen hyvästi on liikaa (2008)
- Äänet (2008)
- Seis seis seis (2011)
- Odessa (2011)

=== EPs ===
- Kipinät (2003)
- Sekunnin (2004)
- Jännite (2004)
- Wiidakko EP (2005)
