= Kaamos (Finnish band) =

Finnish progressive rock band

- Origin: Finland
- Genres: Progressive rock
- Years active: 1973–?

Kaamos was a Finnish progressive rock band formed in 1973.

Deeds and Talks

Studio album by Kaamos
- Released: 1977
- Genre: Progressive rock
- Label: M&T Production

They released one album, Deeds and Talks in 1977 (M&T Production MTLP-7). Album mixed classical and medieval music with folk, blues and funk. Their style was described as "Jethro Tull without the flute".

== Members ==
Originally in 1973:

- Peter Stråhlman (guitar)
- Eero Munter (bass)
- Eero Valkonen (drums)
- Ilkka Poijärvi (organ/keyboards)
- Jimmy Lewman (singer)

As it was common at the time, there were a lot changes of band members. These include:

- Ilpo Murtojärvi (guitar)
- Johnny Gustafsson (singer/drummer)
- Kyösti Laihi (keyboards)
- Jarkko "Jakke" Leivo (bass)
- Eric Gylphe (mixing, guitar)
- Göran "Jocke" Sumelius (lyrics)
