= The Latebirds =

Finnish rock band

The Latebirds are a rock band from Helsinki, Finland. The band was formed in 2000 by drummer Janne Haavisto, bass player Mikko Mäkelä, singer/songwriter Markus Nordenstreng and guitarist Miikka Paatelainen. Guitarist Jussi Jaakonaho replaced Miikka Paatelainen in 2004. Organ player Matti Pitsinki from Finnish instrumental rock group Laika & The Cosmonauts was added to the line-up in 2005.

The Latebirds music has been described as alternative country, alternative rock, folk rock and power pop. The band's influences include artists and groups such as The Band, Neil Young, The Beatles, Bob Dylan, Townes Van Zandt, Tom Petty & The Heartbreakers, The Who, Television, Elvis Costello, Wilco, MC5 and Johnny Cash.

The Latebirds have released three albums to date. Fortune Cookies (2003) was recorded in Finland with producer Lasse Kurki and it included a special guest appearance by well-known American guitarist Marc Ribot. The band's second album, Radio Insomnia (2005) was co-produced by Kurki, Ken Coomer and Charlie Brocco. The album was recorded in upstate New York and it included guest appearances by MC5-guitarist Wayne Kramer, Tom Petty & The Heartbreakers' organ player Benmont Tench, Ken Stringfellow from The Posies and Wilco's John Stirratt and Pat Sansone.

The Latebirds recorded their third album titled Last Of The Good Ol' Days with Grammy-winning producer Jim Scott in Los Angeles. The album was released in 2011 (US)/2012 (UK & Europe). The guest's on the new album include Benmont Tench, Wilco-guitarist Nels Cline and singer/actress Minnie Driver. The Latebirds also recorded an EP with The Band's Levon Helm at his barn studio in Woodstock. Singer legend Kris Kristofferson sings on one of these new recordings.

The band has toured in the US and Europe with artists including Patti Smith, The Posies, Mumford & Sons. and The Jayhawks. In 2006 The Latebirds were invited to support Wilco on their US tour. The tour included a date at Nashville's Ryman Auditorium known also as the original Grand Ole Opry. This marked the first time that an act from Finland performed at the Grand Ole Opry.

== Members ==
=== Current ===
- Markus Nordenstreng - Lead vocals, guitar, piano
- Janne Haavisto - Drums, percussion
- Mikko Mäkelä - Bass, vocals
- Jussi Jaakonaho - Lead guitar
- Matti Pitsinki - Farfisa organ, keyboards, guitar

=== Past ===
- Miikka Paatelainen - guitar

== Discography ==
- Fortune Cookies (2003)
- Radio Insomnia (2005)
- Last Of The Good Ol' Days (2011)
