= Ernos =

Finnish band

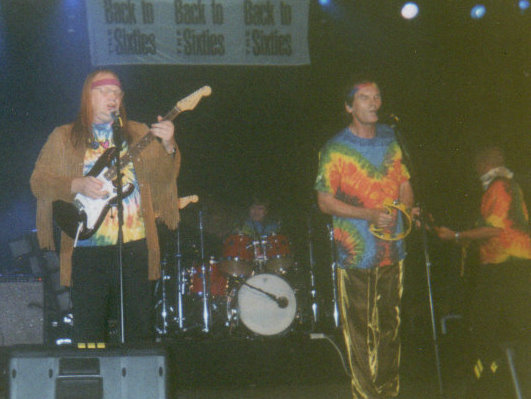
Ernos

Ernos is a Finnish band founded in 1965 by the vocalist-pianist-songwriter Erno Lindahl, after whom the band was also named. Ernos was among the most popular bands in Finland in the 1960s. Their first single 'Yksin' ("Alone"), penned by Lindahl, came out in summer 1966. Soon afterwards the band's bassist Jorma Toivonen and drummer Mikko Kuoppamäki left the Ernos. Late 1966 was released the second single 'Harha' ("Illusion"), another Lindahl composition and probably the best-known track of the Ernos. These were melancholic songs akin to someone like Roy Orbison. Harmonies also played an important part in the Ernos sound, sung alongside Lindahl by Ilari Hannula who joined in 1966, and in summer 1968 Kati Borg and Marjo-Riitta Kervinen. One can even trace doo-wop influences in some of their songs. The Ernos is known for the exuberant stage performances, even visiting Tallinn of Soviet Estonia as the first Western band in autumn 1968. As a celebration the Ernos concert was arranged on 23 Sept 2008 in Tallinn as well, with Ivo Linna and Rock Hotel also performing in concert hall of Estonia theater.

The first Ernos album Rutto ja romu (1968) consisted entirely of Erno Lindahl's own compositions except for the song "Kaikki hyvin", which was a Finnish translation of The Beach Boys' "Good Vibrations". The second album Lekaa otsaan (1970) included some rock classics sung in English. The final album Ernos came out in 1973. Erno Lindahl also did some solo recordings accompanied by the orchestra of Nacke Johansson, such as "Ei hätää" (a Finnish version of "Elenore" by The Turtles) and "Elämältä en halua enempää" ("Ob-La-Di, Ob-La-Da" by The Beatles). In 2016, Lindahl said that a double album consisting of new material had been in development for eight years.

== Singles discography ==
- 'Yksin' (1966)
- 'Harha' (1966)
- 'Kaikki hyvin' (1967)
- 'Jos anteeksi pyydät' (1967)
- 'Myyty mies' (1968)
- 'Turhaan' (1968)
- 'Maria Louiza' (1968)
- 'Ei paljon puutu onnestain' (1969)
- 'Kerran kohtaan ystävän' (1969)
- 'Kyllä' (1969)
- 'Kesäaikaan' (1970)
- 'Papa uu mau mau' (1979)

== Album discography ==
- Rutto ja romu (1968)
- Lekaa otsaan (1970)
- Ernos (1973)
- 20 suosikkia - Harha (a compilation, 1998)
