= End of You (band) =

Finnish alternative rock/gothic metal band

- Origin: Helsinki, Finland
- Genres: Alternative rock; gothic rock; gothic metal; dance-rock
- Years active: 2003–2014; 2017-present
- Labels: Playground; Spinefarm
- Members: Jami Pietilä; Joni Borodavkin; Jani Karppanen
- Website: endofyou.net

End of You is a Finnish alternative rock/gothic metal band formed in 2003 in Helsinki.

== History ==
End Of You was formed in 2003 by Jami Pietilä. After their first video and seven-song demo "Walking With No one" they raised significant interest amongst gothic metal listeners and were signed by Spinefarm Records (Universal).

In November 2005 the first single "Walking with no one" reached No. 17 on the charts and got a lot of air time in Finnish radio stations. On January 4, 2006, it was released in Europe and on March 29, 2006, the anticipated debut album, Unreal, were released. After the release End Of You was interviewed in many music magazines, radio/TV -shows and performed in music festivals.

End Of You's 2nd album Mimesis was released in April 2008 and the single "You Deserve more" had a good reception on Finnish rock radio stations. Unreal and Mimesis were produced by Hiili Hiilesmaa (HIM, Apocalyptica).

On 2009 End Of You decided to part ways with Spinefarm Records and released their 3rd album Remains of the Day together with Playground Music. Single "Star Parade" can still be heard in playlists of many Finnish rock bars and nightclubs.

After headlining a show at famous Tavastia rock club in Helsinki March 2011, End of You decided that is time to take a break after touring eight years.

After the decision End Of You's lead singer Jami Pietilä went around the world trip for almost a year. After the trip, End of You wrote enough material for couple albums, but decided not to complete and release those recordings at the time being. For a while band members took some time to concentrate other projects, but on 2017 band got back together and decided that is time to release something new. Single "Stay" were released November 2017 and "Soul Eater" in May 2018. "Bird on the Wire" were released July 2018.

In 2025, the band became active again and resumed releasing new music. The single Too Far Apart was released in February 2025, marking the beginning of a new chapter. It was followed by Burning Alive in March 2025, further establishing the band's return. A new album is set to be released later the same year.

== Members ==
Current members

- Jami Pietilä – vocals (2003–present)
- Jani Karppanen – guitar (2003–present)
- Joni Borodavkin – keyboards (2003–present)

Past members

- Marko Borodavkin – bass (2009–2017)
- Timo Lehtinen – bass (2003–2009)
- Mika Keijonen – drums (2004–2008)
- Rami Kokko – drums (2003–2004)
- Otto Mäkelä – drums (2009–2010)
- Heikki Sjöblom – drums (2010–2011)

== Discography ==
=== Albums ===
Title	Released
Unreal	March 29, 2006
Mimesis	April 23, 2008
Remains of the Day	April 7, 2010

=== Singles ===
- "Walking With No One" (2006)
- "Upside Down" (2006)
- "You Deserve More" (2008)
- "Star Parade" (2010)
- "Just Like You" (2011)
- "Drift Away" (2013)
- "Stay" (2017)
- "Soul Eater" (2018)
- "Bird on the Wire" (2018)
- "Tyhjä Maa" (2019)
- "Ikuisessa meressä" (2020)
- "Aika" (2020)
- "Too Far Apart", including "In Eternal Sea" (2025)
- "Burning Alive" (2025)
- "Lost" (2025)
- "Dreamless" (2025)
- "Kadonneet unelmat", Finnish version of "Dreamless" (2025)
- "What I'm Not" (2025)

=== Demos ===
- Walking With No One (2004)

=== Compilations ===
- Spinefarm Metal DVD Vol. III (2007)
- Orkus Magazine 19 (CD, Smplr, Enh) (2006)
- Metal Hammer: Grilled à la Spinefarm (2005)
