= Am I Blood =

Finnish thrash metal band

- Also known as: St. Mucus
- Origin: Kerava, Finland
- Genres: Thrash metal, heavy metal
- Years active: 1992–present
- Website: amiblood.com

Am I Blood, formerly named St. Mucus, is a Finnish thrash metal band from Kerava. The band was formed in 1992 with later to be Amorphis frontman Pasi Koskinen, who was originally the singer of the band. They parted ways with Koskinen in 1995, just one month before the recording of debut album Natural Mutation under the name St. Mucus. The band is well known (particularly on the internet) for being mistaken for the popular heavy metal band Metallica, who are arguably a strong influence on the band's music.

The band began recording their fifth album (and latest to date), Existence of Trauma, with a new guitarist and drummer in mid-2008. It was revealed on the band's official MySpace blog that lead songwriter and vocalist Janne Kerminen began writing material for the album in early 2007. The Truth Inside the Dying Sun, the band's fourth album, was made available to download freely at ReverbNation in anticipation of the new album's release.

== Members ==
Current

- Toni Grönroos – bass (1992–present)
- Janne Kerminen – rhythm guitar (1992–2000), vocals (1995–present)
- Mickey Tanttu – drums (2008–present)
- Tomi Luoma – guitar (2008–present)

Former

- Pasi Koskinen – vocals, guitar (1992–1995)
- Pexi Corner (Pekka Kulmala) – guitar (1997–2002)
- Sauli Suomalainen – drums (1992–1998, 1999–2000, 2000–2002)
- Pekka Sauvolainen – drums (1998–1999, 2005–?)
- Hans Lanblade – guitar (1999–2002)
- Gary Reini – drums (?)
- Max Karling – guitar (2005–2006)
- Ilves – guitar (2005–2013)
- Marko Leiviskä – guitar (2006–?)
- Jani Stefanovic – guitar (?), drums (?–2000)
- Pexi Cornera – guitar

== Discography ==
Albums

- Natural Mutation (1995)
- Am I Blood (1997)
- Agitation (1998)
- The Truth Inside the Dying Sun (2001)
- Existence of Trauma (2011)

EPs

- Gone with You (2000)
