= Los Bastardos Finlandeses =

Finnish rock/metal band

- Origin: Helsinki, Finland
- Genres: Hard rock, heavy metal, rock and roll
- Years active: 2005–present
- Labels: 100% Record Company
- Members: El Taff Bastardo (Bryn Jones); El Bastardo Grande (Twist Twist Erkinharju); Don Osmo (Olli Kykkänen); Young Gun (Ailu Immonen)
- Past members: El Muerte (Jussi Kinnunen); El Diablo (Devil Virtanen); El Gringo (Ben Granfelt)
- Website: losbastardos.fi

Los Bastardos Finlandeses (Spanish for The Finnish Bastards) is a band from Helsinki, Finland. They have toured with Lemmy and company as well as Aerosmith and Deep Purple.

In February 2010, they did their debut UK tour covering the key cities London, Oxford, Birmingham and Liverpool. Their fourth album titled "Saved By Rock'n'Roll" came out on the bands's label 100% Record Company in February 2011 and debuted at #9 on Finland's Rumba Magazine's "indie record-label" charts, the chart leaving out large chain stores. "Saved By Rock'n'Roll" was also introduced on the Finnish album charts at #30.

== Current band members ==
- El Taff Bastardo (Bryn Jones) - lead vocals & bass guitar
- El Bastardo Grande (Twist Twist Erkinharju) - drums
- Don Osmo (Olli Kykkänen) - guitar & vocals
- Young Gun (Ailu Immonen) - guitar & vocals

== Discography ==
=== Albums ===
Year	Album	Peak positions
Year	Album	FIN
2007	My Name Is El Muerte	–
2008	Return of El Diablo	–
2009	El Grande's Saloon	–
2011	Saved by Rock'n'Roll	30
2013	Day of the Dead	19
2015	BMF Ball	–
2019	Rock'n'Roll	–
2022	VIVA!	–

=== Singles ===
Year	Single	Peak positions	Album
Year	Single	FIN	Album
2006	"Viva Los Bastardos!"	3	My Name is El Muerte
2006	"So Cold"	–	
2007	"Born 'N' Raised"	14	My Name is El Muerte
2012	"Day of the Dead"	–	Day of the Dead
2013	"Smokin' Dynamite"	–	
