= CMX discography =

The discography of CMX starts in 1985 and continues to this day. During this time, the band has released fifteen studio albums, two box set compilations, 20 top ten singles on the Finnish charts (seven of which have topped the charts), four EPs, and a DVD.

== Albums ==
=== Studio albums ===
Released	Chart peak	Certification	Album title	Translation	Label
January, 1990	-	-	Kolmikärki	Trident	Bad Vugum
8 June 1991	-	-	Veljeskunta	Brotherhood	Bad Vugum
November, 1992	-	-	Aurinko	Sun	Herodes/EMI
February, 1994	-	gold (1999)	Aura	Aura (or the noun Plow)	Herodes/EMI
March, 1995	-	gold (2001)	Rautakantele	Iron Kantele	Herodes/EMI
November, 1996	3	gold (1998)	Discopolis	Discopolis	Herodes/EMI
October, 1998	1	gold (1998)	Vainajala	Place of the Dead	Herodes/EMI
October, 2000	2	gold (2000)	Dinosaurus Stereophonicus	Dinosaurus Stereophonicus	Herodes/EMI
2 August 2002	1	gold (2002)	Isohaara	Big prong	Herodes/EMI
10 November 2003	1	gold (2003)	Aion	Aeon (or I intend)	Herodes/EMI
2 November 2005	1	gold (2005)	Pedot	Beasts	Herodes/EMI
5 September 2007	2	gold (2008)	Talvikuningas	The Winter King	Herodes/EMI
29 September 2010	1		Iäti	Forever	Herodes/EMI
22 February 2013	1		Seitsentahokas	Heptagon	Ratas Music Group
30 January 2015	1		Mesmeria	Mesmeria	Ratas Music Group
9 February 2018	1		Alkuteos	Early Work	Sony

Translations by Tero Valkonen.

=== Compilations ===
Released	Chart Peak	Certification	Album Title	Label
September, 1997	3	gold (2000)	Cloaca Maxima	Herodes/EMI
15 November 2004	9	gold (2004)	Cloaca Maxima II	Herodes/EMI
5 November 2008	9		Kaikki hedelmät (1992-2008) (transl. All Fruits)	EMI
2016	7		Cloaca Maxima III	

== EPs ==
Released	Title	Label	Other
1987	Johannes Kastaja (transl. John the Baptist)	P.Tuotanto	Also released on Kolmikärki Gold (2002)
1989	Raivo (transl. Rage)	Bad Vugum	Also released on Kolmikärki Gold (2002)
1990	Tanssitauti (transl. Dance Disease)	Bad Vugum	Also released on Veljeskunta Gold (2002)
1998	Musiikin ystävälliset kasvot + 5 (transl. The Friendly Face of Music +5)	Bad Vugum	Recorded in 1991; Four songs also released on Veljeskunta Gold (2002)

== Singles ==
Released	Chart Peak	Song Title	Writer(s)	Time
1991	-	"Musiikin ystävälliset kasvot" (transl. The Friendly Face of Music)	?	4:01
1992	-	"Manalainen" (transl. Underwolder)	Halmkrona, Yrjänä	3:21
1992	-	"Härjät" (transl. Bulls)	Halmkrona, Yrjänä	3:44
1994	-	"Ruoste" (transl. Rust)	Yrjänä	4:01
1994	-	"Kultanaamio" (transl. The Gold Mask)	Yrjänä	4:39
1995	-	"Pelasta maailma" (transl. Save the World)	Halmkrona, Kanniainen, Rasio, Yrjänä	4:15
10/1996	4	"Nimetön" (transl. Nameless)	Halmkrona, Kanniainen, Rasio, Yrjänä	3:35
10/1996	2	"Aamutähti" (transl. Morning Star)	Halmkrona, Kanniainen, Rasio, Yrjänä	4:31
1/1997	4	"Vallat ja väet" (transl. The Powers and the Crowds)	Halmkrona, Kanniainen, Rasio, Yrjänä	4:21
8/1997	-	"Siivekäs" (transl. Winged)	Halmkrona, Kanniainen, Rasio, Yrjänä	4:41
9/1997	-	"Ainomieli '97"	Halmkrona, Yrjänä	3:30
10/1998	2	"Ei yksikään" (transl. Not One)	Halmkrona, Peippo, Rasio, Yrjänä	3:26
11/1998	7	"Sillanrakentaja" (transl. The Bridgebuilder)	Halmkrona, Peippo, Rasio, Yrjänä	4:14
3/1999	5	"Surunmurhaaja" (transl. Murderer of Sorrow)	Halmkrona, Peippo, Rasio, Yrjänä	3:47
8/2000	1	"Myrskyn ratsut" (transl. Steeds of Storm)	Halmkrona, Peippo, Rasio, Yrjänä	6:27
10/2000	1	"Jatkuu niinkuin sade" (transl. Goes On Like the Rain)	Halmkrona, Peippo, Rasio, Yrjänä	4:29
1/2001	6	"Iliman pielet" (transl. Frames of the Air)	Halmkrona, Peippo, Rasio, Yrjänä	4:21
2/2001	7	"Meidän syntimme" (transl. Our Sins)	Halmkrona, Peippo, Rasio, Yrjänä	4:52
10/2001	-	"Puuvertaus" (transl. Tree Metaphor)	Halmkrona, Peippo, Rasio, Yrjänä	4:34
06/2002	2	"Pohjoista leveyttä" (transl. Northern Latitude)	Halmkrona, Peippo, Rasio, Yrjänä	3:20
07/2002	2	"Minun sydämeni on särkynyt" (transl. My Heart is Broken)	Halmkrona, Peippo, Rasio, Yrjänä	3:58
10/2002	3	"Minne paha haudattiin" (transl. Where Evil Was Buried)	Halmkrona, Peippo, Rasio, Yrjänä	5:31
1/2003	-	"Silmien takana" (transl. Behind the Eyes)	Halmkrona, Peippo, Rasio, Yrjänä	4:05
5/2003	1	"Lepattajat" (transl. Flickerers)	Halmkrona, Peippo, Rasio, Yrjänä	4:12
10/2003	1	"Melankolia" (transl. Melancholy)	Halmkrona, Peippo, Rasio, Yrjänä	4:12
2/2004	1	"Palvelemaan konetta" (transl. To Serve the Machine)	Halmkrona, Peippo, Rasio, Yrjänä	3:52
09/2004	-	"Kauneus pettää" (transl. Beauty Betrays)	Halmkrona, Peippo, Rasio, Yrjänä	3:54
2/2005	-	"Olet tässä" (transl. You're Here)	Halmkrona, Peippo, Rasio, Yrjänä	4:36
10/2005	1	"Uusi ihmiskunta" (transl. New Mankind)	Halmkrona, Peippo, Rasio, Yrjänä	3:31
2/2006	2	"Kain" (transl. Cain)	Halmkrona, Peippo, Rasio, Yrjänä	3:55
8/2006	1	"Vapaus johtaa kansaa"* (transl. Freedom Leads the People or Freedom to Lead the People)	Yrjänä	4:15
6/2007	2	"Kuolemaantuomitut" (transl. Sentenced to Death)	Halmkrona, Peippo, Rasio, Yrjänä	4:04
10/2008	?	"Rautalankaa" (transl. Wire)	Halmkrona, Peippo, Rasio, Yrjänä	3:53
6/2010	?	"Sateenkaaren pää" (transl. End of the Rainbow)	Halmkrona, Peippo, Rasio, Yrjänä	3:39
8/2010	?	"Linnunrata" (transl. Milky Way)	Halmkrona, Peippo, Rasio, Yrjänä	4:17
12/2012	15	"Kusimyrsky" (transl. Piss Storm)		

- "Vapaus johtaa kansaa" was recorded together with Kotiteollisuus and 51Koodia.

== Cassette demos ==
- Raiskattu lastulevy (transl. Raped chipboard) (1985) - done with a vague lineup
- Demo (1985) - the lineup came the same that in Johannes Kastaja and Raivo EPs and Kolmikärki album
- Pohjolan Valkeus (transl. Whiteness of the North) (1986)
- Johannes Kastaja (transl. John the Baptist) (1987) - includes two new songs, one which lyrics differ a little from previous version, two with same music but completely different lyrics than in the previous demos and six which are recorded again but don't differ a much from previous versions

== Other ==
- CMX DVD (2001)
- Tuuliajolla 2006 (2006) -- DVD, various artists
- "Punainen komentaja" (2007) - animation based on the Talvikuningas storyline and part VIII "Punainen komentaja".
