= Cloaca Maxima II =

Compilation album by CMX
- Released: 2004
- Recorded: 1998–2004
- Genre: Progressive rock
- Length: 195:12
- Label: Herodes/EMI
- Producer: see individual albums

Professional ratings
Review scores
Source	Rating
Rockmusica.net	4/5 stars

Cloaca Maxima II (2004) is the second compilation album by the Finnish rock group CMX, released seven years after their first compilation Cloaca Maxima. The name Cloaca Maxima means "Great Sewer" in Latin, and was also the name of the band before it was shortened to CMX. The compilation consists of three CDs named Lyijy, Helium and Uraani respectively. The names of the CDs are all names of chemical elements in Finnish: Lead, Helium and Uranium. The compilation is divided between CDs in a similar way to the earlier Cloaca Maxima. Lyijy contains rock songs that CMX would usually play on stage, while Helium focuses on softer material. Uraani is reserved for B-sides of singles and some other CMX rarities. Three new songs were recorded exclusively for the compilation.

== Track listing ==
All songs written by CMX with lyrics by A. W. Yrjänä.

=== CD 1: Lyijy ===
1. "Olet tässä" – 4:36 (a new song)
2. "Surunmurhaaja" – 3:48 (from Vainajala)
3. "Jatkuu niinkuin sade" – 4:35 (from Dinosaurus Stereophonicus)
4. "Pohjoista leveyttä" – 3:18 (from Isohaara)
5. "Taivaan lapset" – 3:50 (from Vainajala)
6. "Lepattajat" – 4:12 (released only as a single)
7. "Ei yksikään" – 3:27 (from Vainajala)
8. "Luuhamara" – 4:20 (from Dinosaurus Stereophonicus)
9. "Puuvertaus" – 4:36 (released only as a single included with the CMX DVD)
10. "Pirunnyrkki" – 3:19 (from Aion)
11. "Minne paha haudattiin" – 5:32 (from Isohaara)
12. "Palvelemaan konetta" – 3:55 (from Aion)
13. "Meidän syntimme" – 4:33 (from Dinosaurus Stereophonicus)
14. "Pyörivät sähkökoneet '04" – 4:06 (a new version of a song from Kolmikärki)

=== CD 2: Helium ===
1. "Kauneus pettää" – 3:54 (a new song)
2. "Kuoleman risteyksestä kolme virstaa pohjoiseen" – 5:44 (from Aion)
3. "Vainajala '04" – 6:05 (a new version of a song from Vainajala)
4. "Minun sydämeni on särkynyt" – 3:59 (from Isohaara)
5. "Tuonen lintu" – 5:33 (from Dinosaurus Stereophonicus)
6. "Sillanrakentaja" – 4:17 (from Vainajala)
7. "Sielunvihollinen" – 4:03 (from Aion)
8. "Baikonur" – 7:29 (shortened version of a song from Dinosaurus Stereophonicus)
9. "Tähdet sylissään" – 7:49 (from Dinosaurus Stereophonicus)
10. "Tuulilukko" – 4:28 (from Isohaara)
11. "Myrskyn ratsut" – 6:29 (from Dinosaurus Stereophonicus)
12. "Melankolia" – 4:11 (from Aion)
13. "Revontulten repijä" – 6:13 (from Isohaara)
14. "Vanha talvitie" – 6:01 (from Vainajala)

=== CD 3: Uraani ===
1. "Päämäärä" – 4:13 (a new version of a song originally composed by A. W. Yrjänä in the Hotelli Sointu TV show)
2. "Ei tästä maailmasta" – 4:29 (B-side of "Meidän syntimme")
3. "Väkivallan moottorit" – 3:30 (B-side of "Pohjoista leveyttä")
4. "π" – 4:26 (B-side of "Surunmurhaaja")
5. "Kvartetto rock-yhtyeelle ja solistille, op. 1" – 4:22 (B-side of "Minne paha haudattiin")
6. "Ehdotus ensimmäisen mainoskatkon paikaksi" – 2:48 (B-side of "Myrskyn ratsut")
7. "Ruisperkele" – 2:27 (B-side of "Lepattajat")
8. "Kolme kimaltavaa neitoa" – 4:24 (B-side of "Pohjoista leveyttä")
9. "Kiusaajien kiusaaja" – 2:45 (B-side of "Palvelemaan konetta")
10. "Epäluoma" – 3:04 (B-side of "Minun sydämeni on särkynyt")
11. "Negatiivinen asenne" – 2:34 (B-side of "Jatkuu niinkuin sade")
12. "Ehdota jotain parempaa" – 3:31 (B-side of "Minne paha haudattiin")
13. "Punainen nro. 6" – 6:00 (B-side of "Sillanrakentaja")
14. "Helevetinkone" – 3:30 (B-side of "Minun sydämeni on särkynyt")
15. "10^{118}" – 4:44 (B-side of "Melankolia")
16. "Huntu" – 3:40 (B-side of "Palvelemaan konetta")

== Personnel ==
- A. W. Yrjänä – vocals, bass guitar
- Janne Halmkrona – guitars
- Timo Rasio – guitars
- Tuomas Peippo – drums
- Gabi Hakanen – producer, engineer, mixing
- Illusion Rake – producer, engineer, mixing
- Billy Gould – producer
- Teropekka Virtanen – engineer, mixing
- Pauli Saastamoinen – mastering
- Jouni Leskinen – sleeve art/design
- Ari Talusén – photography
