= Cloaca Maxima (album) =

Compilation album by CMX
- Released: September 1997
- Recorded: 1989–1997
- Genre: Progressive rock
- Length: 169:57
- Label: Herodes/EMI
- Producer: see individual albums

Professional ratings
Review scores
Source	Rating
Allmusic	2.5/5 stars

Cloaca Maxima (1997) is the first compilation album by the Finnish rock group CMX. The name Cloaca Maxima means "Great Sewer" in Latin, and was also an early name of the band before it was shortened to CMX. The compilation contains three CDs named Physis, Aetheris and Astralis respectively. Physis, contains rock songs from their albums and EPs, while Aetheris focuses on softer material. The third CD is reserved for B-sides of singles and some new songs recorded solely for the compilation.

== Track listing ==
All songs written by CMX with lyrics by A. W. Yrjänä.

=== CD 1: Physis ===
1. "Ainomieli '97" – 3:30 (a new version of a song from Aurinko)
2. "Nimetön" – 3:37 (from Discopolis)
3. "Kultanaamio" – 4:55 (from Aura)
4. "Nahkaparturi" – 1:48 (from Kolmikärki)
5. "Nainen tanssii tangoa" – 4:34 (from Aura)
6. "Vallat ja väet" – 4:21 (from Discopolis)
7. "Kirosäkeet" – 4:10 (from Rautakantele)
8. "Suljettu astia" – 3:34 (from Discopolis)
9. "Elokuun kruunu" – 4:32 (from Aura)
10. "Rautakantele" – 4:32 (from Rautakantele)
11. "Hiki" – 2:03 (from Raivo)
12. "Manalainen" – 3:25 (from Aurinko)
13. "Kätketty kukka" – 4:38 (from Veljeskunta)
14. "Linnunhammas" – 3:21 (from Rautakantele)
15. "Marian ilmestys" – 5:47 (from Aurinko)

=== CD 2: Aetheris ===
1. "Hiljaisuuteen" – 2:04 (from Rautakantele)
2. "Ruoste" – 4:01 (from Aura)
3. "Helvetin hyvä paimen" – 2:47 (from Veljeskunta)
4. "Talviunia" – 3:30 (from Rautakantele)
5. "Turkoosi" – 4:18 (from Aura)
6. "Veden ääri" – 3:07 (from Rautakantele)
7. "Aura" – 3:31 (from Aura)
8. "Pelasta maailma" – 4:16 (from Rautakantele)
9. "Tähteinvälinen '97" – 5:06 (a new version of a song from Aurinko)
10. "Tulikiveä" – 3:50 (from Veljeskunta)
11. "Yöllisiä" – 3:20 (from Rautakantele)
12. "Mikään ei vie sitä pois" – 3:19 (from Aura)
13. "Yö ei ole pimeä päivä" – 3:08 (from Aurinko)
14. "Talvipäivänseisaus" – 4:46 (from Aura)

=== CD 3: Astralis ===
1. "Musiikin ystävälliset kasvot '97" – 4:08 (a new version of the single "Musiikin ystävälliset kasvot")
2. "Katariinanpyörä" – 2:33 (acoustic version of a song from Aurinko, appeared as a B-side of "Manalainen")
3. "Siivekäs" – 4:41 (a new song, also released as a single)
4. "Hyvä tahto" – 4:11 (a new song)
5. "Joet" – 3:47 (B-side of "Pelasta maailma")
6. "Aamutähti '97" – 4:29 (a new version of a song from Discopolis)
7. "Keskellä" – 2:18 (B-side of "Kultanaamio")
8. "Marmori" – 4:17 (a new song)
9. "Seittemän Jeesusta" – 3:20 (B-side of "Nimetön")
10. "Riitti" – 4:43 (B-side of "Vallat ja väet")
11. "Saatana" – 4:17 (B-side of "Ruoste")
12. "Pimeä maa (live '95)" – 3:58 (a song from the Tanssitauti EP recorded at Tavastia Club, Helsinki 1995)
13. "Näkyjen pitelijä" – 5:21 (B-side of "Manalainen")
14. "Shakti" – 4:35 (a new song)
15. "Reuna" – 3:07 (a new song)

== Personnel ==
- A. W. Yrjänä - Vocals, bass guitar
- Janne Halmkrona - Guitars
- Timo Rasio - Guitars
- Pekka Kanniainen - Drums
- Gabi Hakanen - Producer, engineer, mixing
- Illusion Rake - Engineer, mixing
- Teropekka Virtanen - Engineer
- Ilkka Herkman - Engineer
- Dan Tigerstedt - Mixing
- Sumppi Sundström - Mixing (Tavastia)
- Pauli Saastamoinen - Mastering
- Jouni Leskinen - Sleeve art/design
- Ari Talusén - Photography
- Timo Lehtovaara - Choir leader
- Veikko Huuskonen - Strings
