= Lärm =

Dutch hardcore punk band

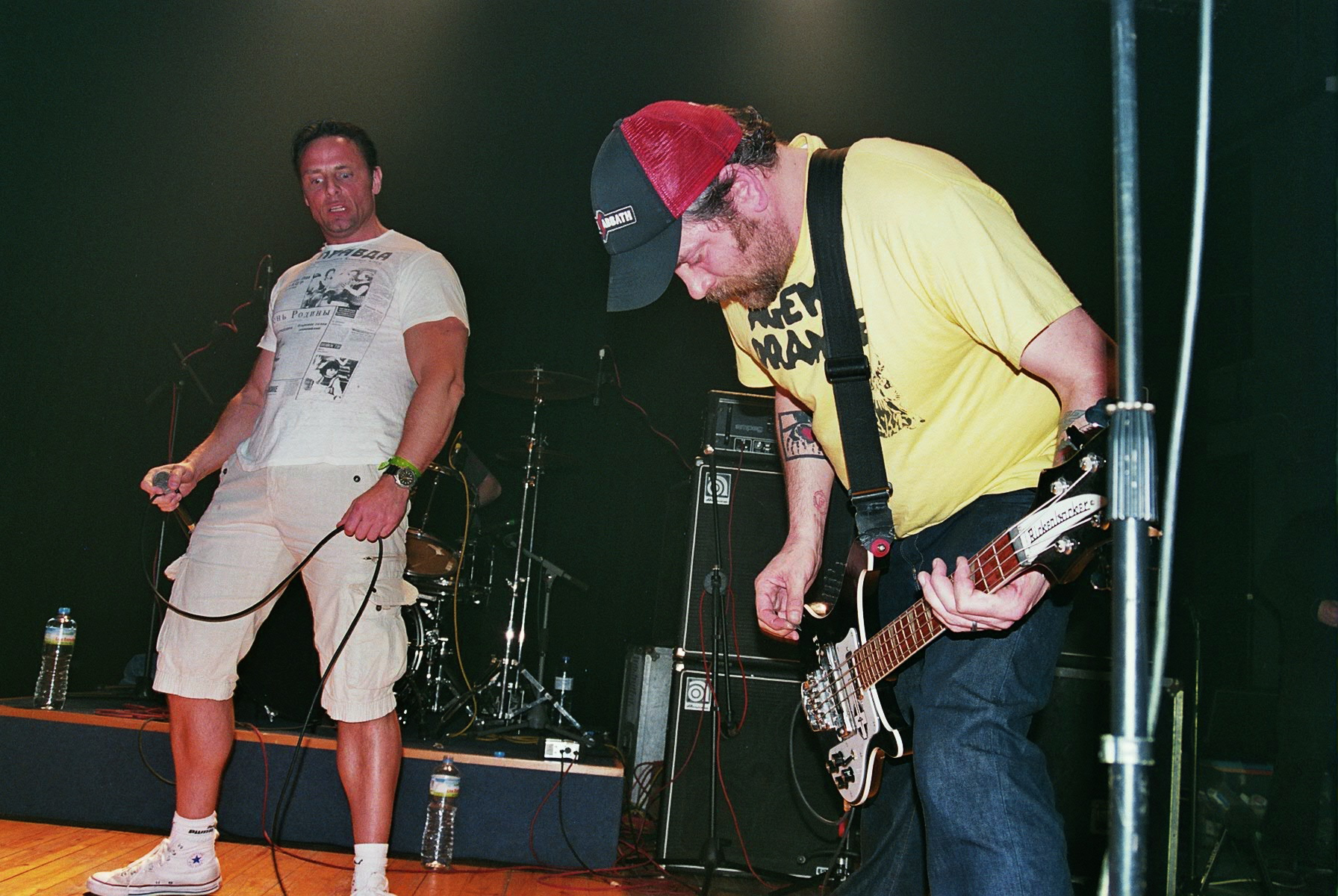
- Lärm in 2008

Background information
- Origin: Amersfoort, Netherlands
- Genres: Hardcore punk; thrashcore; powerviolence
- Years active: 1982–1987, 2003-2012
- Labels: Eenheidsfront; One Step Ahead; Definite Choice; Way Back When
- Past members: Menno; Paul van den Berg; Jos Houtveen; Olav van den Berg; Dorien

Lärm (German for noise) were a Dutch hardcore punk band from Achterveld and Amersfoort, formed in 1982, originally playing under the name Total Chaoz. They are considered pioneers of the blast beat, as well as one of the first bands to be labeled as thrashcore. The band referred to their music as "extreme noise", due to their short, fast, and out of tune playing style. Maximumrocknroll has cited them as "very politically aware and idealistic", while describing their music as "raging, noisy outbursts" and additionally characterizing them as "Holland’s version of a young DRI."

== History ==
The band was formed by Jos, Dorien, Paul, and Olav in December 1982 after changing their name from Total Chaoz. The name change was due to other bands already using the name Total Chaos, and because of the members' love for Finnish hardcore punk bands such as Riistetyt, Kaaos, and Terveet Kädet. Their lyrics were very social and political, covering themes of fascism, religion, and capitalism, as well as speaking about topics such as the arms race and the third world. Lärm was seen as different from many other bands, as members of the group were part of the straight edge movement, something that uncommon in the crust punk scene at the time.

Lärm disbanded in 1987 and members went on to form Seein' Red a year later. in 1990, members formed the communist straight edge band Manliftingbanner who played in a more conventional hardcore punk style.

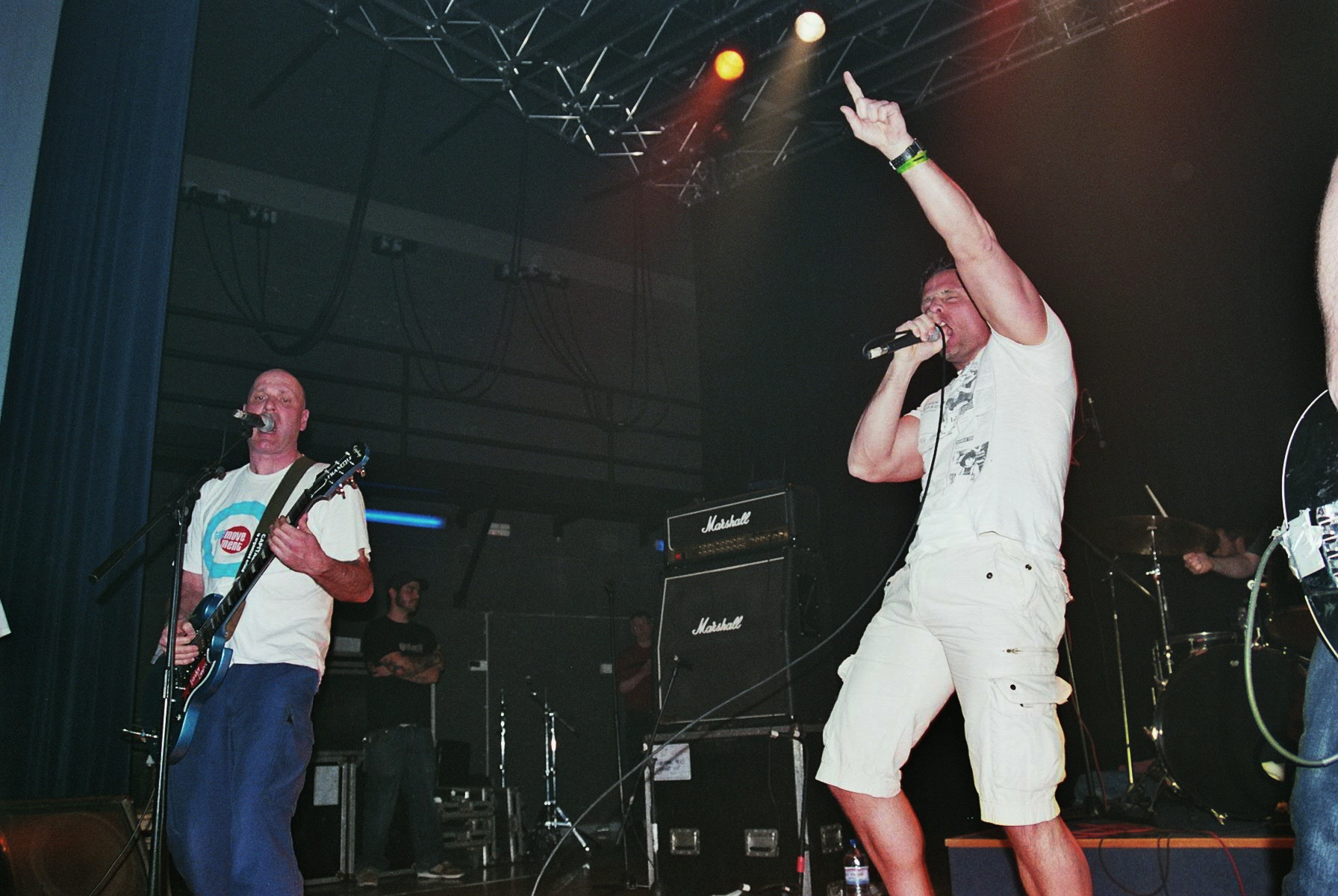
Lärm performing live in 2008

They reformed in 2003 and played shows until 2012. Since 2012, the band has played occasional one-off reunion concerts in their home country.

== Trivia ==
Lärm are considered to be one of the first bands to use the super-fast "jackhammer" blast drum beat, a conventional playing style that became prevalent in powerviolence and extreme metal music later on. Napalm Death adopted the blast beat on drums after seeing Lärm play live in the early '80s.

== Members ==
- Menno - vocals (1982-1987, 2003-2012)
- Paul van den Berg - guitar (1982-1987, 2003-2012)
- Jos Houtveen - bass (1982-1987, 2003-2012)
- Olav van den Berg - drums (1982-1987, 2003-2012)
- Dorien - vocals (1982-1983)

== Discography ==
=== Studio albums ===
- Campaign For Musical Destruction / No Secrets - split w/ Stanx (1984, Eenheidsfront Records)
- Straight on View (1986, One Step Ahead Records)
- It's About Time... To Fight Back!!! - split w/ Seein' Red (1997, Axioma Promotions)
- Lärm (2010, Way Back When Records)

=== EPs ===
- No One Can Be That Dumb (1986, Self-released)
- Nothing Is Hard in This World if You Dare to Scale the Heights (1987, Definite Choice Records)
- Extreme Noise Terrorism (1995, Left Wing Records)
- Destroy Sexism (1995, Wicked Witch Records)

=== Compilations ===
- Extreme Noise (Complete Campaign For Musical Destruction) (1997, Coalition Records)

=== Compilation appearances ===
- End the Warzone (1986, One Step Ahead Records)

=== Miscellaneous ===
- Lärm as Fuck / Humus - split (2004, Wasted Youth Power Records)
