= Cloaca Maxima (disambiguation) =

The Cloaca Maxima is one of the world's earliest sewage systems.

Cloaca Maxima may also refer to:

- Cloaca Maxima (album), a 1997 compilation album
- Cloaca Maxima (band), a Finnish rock band
