= Iäti =

Studio album by CMX
- Released: September 29, 2010
- Label: Herodes/EMI

CMX chronology
Talvikuningas (2007)	Iäti (2010)	Seitsentahokas (2013)

Iäti is the thirteenth album by the Finnish rock group CMX. It was released in 2010, three years after the previous Talvikuningas. Compared to the previous album Iäti is more of a traditional rock album. It ranked first as most sold album on The Official Finnish Charts.

Iäti is last CMX album with drummer Tuomas Peippo.

== Track listing ==
Songs by CMX. All lyrics by A. W. Yrjänä.

1. "Sateenkaaren pää" – 3:40 (End of the Rainbow)
2. "Kappaleina" – 3:24 (In Pieces)
3. "Taistele" – 4:01 (Fight)
4. "Auringon kultainen kaupunki" – 4:26 (The Golden City of the Sun)
5. "Kuoleman kulkumies" – 3:52 (The Wanderer of Death)
6. "Iäti" – 4:04 (Evermore)
7. "Totenmann" – 4:52
8. "Manisola" – 3:38
9. "Kättenpäällepanijat" – 4:07 (Those who lay hands on heads)
10. "Linnunrata" – 4:52 (The Milky Way)
11. "Laulu todellisuuden luonteesta" – 4.52 (Song about the nature of Reality)

== Personnel ==
- A. W. Yrjänä – vocals, bass, acoustic guitar
- Janne Halmkrona – electric- and acoustic guitars, backing vocals
- Timo Rasio – electric- and acoustic guitars, bass, backing vocals
- Tuomas Peippo – drums, percussion

== See also ==
- CMX discography
