= Propaganda (disambiguation) =

Propaganda is a form of communication that is aimed at influencing the attitude of a community toward some cause or position.

Propaganda may also refer to:

== Books and magazines ==
- Propaganda (book), a 1928 book by Edward Bernays
- Propaganda (fanzine), a Finnish punk subculture fanzine founded in 1979, later reissued digitally in 2015
- Propaganda: The Formation of Men's Attitudes, a 1965 book by Jacques Ellul
- Propaganda, The Game, a part of the set of Academic Games developed by Professors Robert and Layman Allen
- Propaganda (magazine), a former magazine about Goth subculture, issued between 1982 and 2002

== Music ==
=== Record labels ===
- Propaganda (label), a Finnish record label, founded in 1981
- Propaganda Records, a Finnish record company, founded in 1981

=== Artists ===
- Propaganda (band), a German synthpop group, formed in 1982
- Propaganda (Russian band), a Russian pop/synthpop band, formed in 2001
- Propaganda (Yugoslav band), a Yugoslav new wave band, formed in 1981
- Propaganda (musician), a Christian hip hop and spoken word artist and poet

=== Albums ===
- Propaganda (Sparks album), 1974
- Propaganda (The Sound album), 1999
- Propaganda (Aftershock album), a 2001 compilation album
- Propaganda (Melotron album), 2007
- Propaganda (Fred Frith album), 2015

=== Songs ===
- "Propaganda" (song), a song by Fabri Fibra
- "Propaganda", a song by Sepultura on their album Chaos A.D.
- "Propaganda", a song by Briskeby
- "Propaganda", a song by DJ Snake on their album Encore
- "Propaganda", a song from Absolute Design by Engel
- "Propaganda", a song by Muse on their album Simulation Theory
- "Propaganda", a song used in JoJo's Bizarre Adventure

== Film ==
- Propaganda (1999 film), a Turkish comedy film by director Sinan Çetin
- Propaganda (2012 film), a New Zealand mockumentary representing itself as a North Korean propaganda film.
- Propaganda film, usually a documentary-style production or a fictional screenplay, that is produced to convince the viewer of a certain political point or influence the opinions or behavior of people, often by providing deliberately misleading, propagandistic content
- Propaganda Films, a music video company

== Other uses ==
- Sacra congregatio de propaganda fide, a former Latin name of the Congregation for the Evangelization of Peoples
- Propaganda Games, a former game development company based in Vancouver, British Columbia, Canada
- Propaganda Movement, a political movement in the late 19th century Philippines
