= Tanssitauti =

EP by CMX
- Released: Autumn 1990
- Genre: Hardcore
- Length: 9:47
- Label: Bad Vugum
- Producer: CMX

Tanssitauti is an EP by CMX released in 1990. The band had released their debut album Kolmikärki earlier the same year with a different lineup. Tanssitauti is the first CMX recording to feature guitarist Janne Halmkrona, who appears on all of the band's albums from this point on.

"Tanssitauti", literally "Dance Disease", is Finnish and is used to refer to Huntington's disease.

== Track listing ==
All tracks written by A. W. Yrjänä.

1. "Matti" (orig." ...") -- 0:27
2. "Tanssin jumala" (The God Of A Dance) —2:31
3. "Hän on tullut" (He Has Come) —0:55
4. "Pimeä maa" (Dark Land) —3:41
5. "Pornogeneraattori" (Porn Generator) —2:13

First track was originally unnamed and referred with "...". At first band did not intend it to be published but publisher Bad Vugum convinced them to release it. Since then it has become known as "Matti" and live performance specialty. The name comes from lyrics.

A live version of "Pimeä maa" appears on the 1997 compilation album Cloaca Maxima.

== Personnel ==
- A. W. Yrjänä -- vocals, bass
- Janne Halmkrona - guitar
- Pasi Isometsä—guitar
- Pekka Kanniainen -- drums

== See also ==
- CMX discography
