= Seitsentahokas =

Studio album by CMX
- Released: 22 February 2013
- Studio: SF Sound Studios, Inkfish Studios
- Genre: Progressive rock, rock
- Label: Ratas Music Group Oy
- Producer: Rauli "Illusion Rake" Eskolin

CMX chronology
Iäti (2010)	Seitsentahokas (2013)	Mesmeria (2015)

Seitsentahokas is the fourteenth album by the Finnish rock group CMX. It was released in 2013 and ranked as most sold album on The Official Finnish Charts.

Seitsentahokas is the first album with Olli-Matti Wahlström, as their former drummer Tuomas Peippo left after their previous album, "Iäti".

Compared to their previous effort, Seitsentahokas is more diverse. To that end, first single "Kusimyrsky" is more progressive and heavy while second single "Rikkisuudeltu" is simpler and more pop-based.

== Track listing ==
Lyrics by A. W. Yrjänä; music as noted. Arrangements by CMX and Rauli Eskolin.

1. Valoruumis – 04:19 (music Yrjänä – Janne Halmkrona – Timo Rasio)
2. Etuvartio – 03:33 (music Yrjänä – Halmkrona – Rasio)
3. En tahdo nähdä enää yhtään alastonta – 05:10 (music Yrjänä)
4. Luotisuora – 04:32 (music Yrjänä – Rasio)
5. Nrsisti – 04:57 (music Yrjänä)
6. Kusimyrsky – 08:01 (music Yrjänä – Halmkrona – Rasio)
7. Rikkisuudeltu – 03:47 (music Yrjänä – Halmkrona – Rasio)
8. Me tulemme kaikkialta – 05:34 (music Yrjänä – Halmkrona – Rasio)
9. Jyrsijä – 04:10 (music Yrjänä – Halmkrona – Rasio)
10. Seitsentahokas – 06:31 (music Yrjänä)

== Singles ==
- Kusimyrsky (30.11.2012)
- Rikkisuudeltu (25.1.2013)

== Personnel ==
- A. W. Yrjänä – vocals, bass
- Janne Halmkrona – guitar
- Timo Rasio – guitar
- Olli-Matti Wahlström – drums
- Raili "Rake" Eskolin – production, sounding and mixing

== See also ==
- CMX discography
