= Pelasta maailma =

Single by CMX

from the album Rautakantele
- Released: March 1995
- Recorded: Winter 1994–1995
- Genre: Rock
- Length: 4:15
- Label: Herodes/EMI
- Songwriter(s): A. W. Yrjänä, Janne Halmkrona, Timo Rasio, Pekka Kanniainen
- Producer(s): A. W. Yrjänä

CMX singles chronology
"Kultanaamio" (1994)	"Pelasta maailma" (1995)	"Nimetön" (1996)

"Pelasta maailma" is the first single from the CMX album Rautakantele. It also appears on the compilation album Cloaca Maxima. The chorus contains a quote from a poem by L. Onerva. "Pelasta maailma" means "Save the World" in Finnish.

== Track listing ==
1. "Pelasta maailma"—4:15
2. "Joet (acoustic live)"—3:52

== Cover versions ==
- Antti Tuisku, Minun jouluni (2005)
- Vesa-Matti Loiri, Ivalo (2006)

== Personnel ==
- A. W. Yrjänä -- vocals, bass
- Janne Halmkrona -- guitar
- Timo Rasio—guitar
- Pekka Kanniainen -- drums
- Mara Salminen -- keyboards, backing vocals
- Susanna Eronen—backing vocals
- Essi Wuorela—backing vocals
- Satu Sopanen -- kantele
- Risto Salmi -- soprano saxophone
- Kikke Heikkinen—backing vocals
- Kaarina Kilpiö -- percussion
- Keijo Puumalainen—percussion
- Ville Leppänen -- distorted slide guitar

== See also ==
- CMX discography
