= Läjä Äijälä =

Finnish musician, comics artist and poet (born 1958)

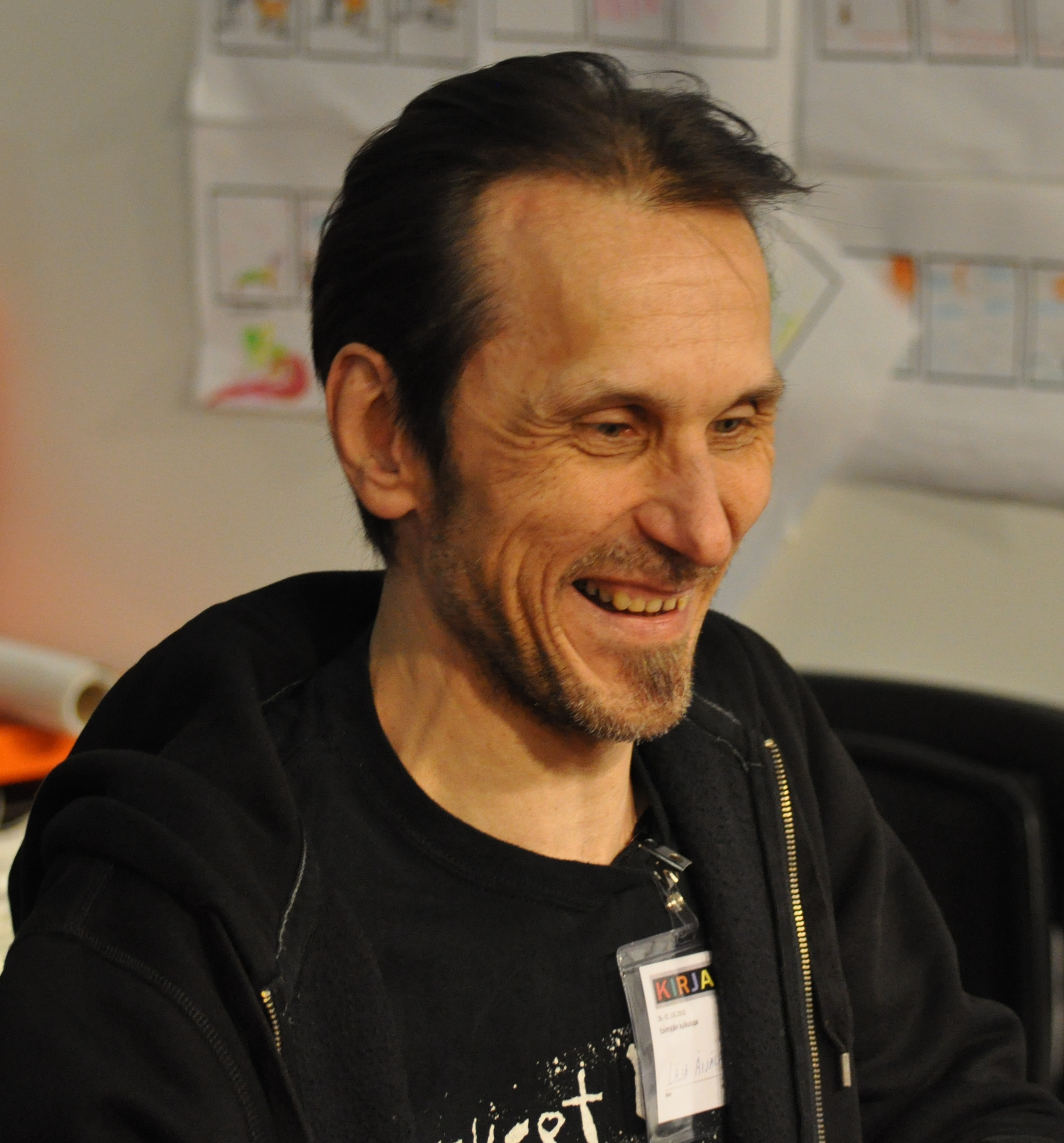
- Läjä Äijälä at Helsinki Book Fair in 2010.

Background information
- Born: Veli-Matti Äijälä; September 29, 1958 (age 68); Tornio, Finland
- Genres: Punk, alternative rock, thrash metal, extreme metal, electronic music, noise rock, ambient, experimental, avant-garde
- Occupations: Musician, songwriter, comics artist, poet
- Instrument: Vocals
- Years active: 1978–present
- Member of: Terveet Kädet
- Formerly of: Death Trip, Billy Boys, The Leo Bugariloves

Veli-Matti "Läjä" Äijälä (born 29 September 1958) is a Finnish musician, comics artist and poet. He is best known as the singer and primary songwriter of the legendary hardcore punk band Terveet Kädet.

Äijälä has been associated with many side projects like the synthpop band Leo Bugariloves, rockabilly group Billy Boys and noise rock band Death Trip. In 2004, Äijälä released a compilation album Passions of Läjä Äijälä which includes music of Terveet Kädet and eight of his side projects.

Läjä Äijälä has been working as a comics artist since the 1980s. He has released several comics albums and a book of his poems. Äijälä has also done the artwork for some album covers. One of his works is the cover of Johannes Kastaja by CMX.
