= Discopolis =

Studio album by CMX
- Released: November 1996
- Recorded: June – September 1996
- Genre: Progressive rock
- Length: 45:53
- Label: Herodes/EMI
- Producer: Gabi Hakanen with A. W. Yrjänä and Janne Halmkrona

CMX chronology
Rautakantele (1995)	Discopolis (1996)	Vainajala (1998)

Professional ratings
Review scores
Source	Rating
Allmusic	2.5/5 stars

Discopolis is the sixth studio album by the Finnish rock group CMX.

With Discopolis, CMX took a different approach on recording with the goal of making the first entirely Pro Tools -based album in Finland. The basic concept was to build the songs from small pieces, emphasizing editing and production over playing and recording. The result was successful in sales, but received some negative critique in reviews.

== Track listing ==
All songs written by CMX with lyrics by A. W. Yrjänä.

1. "Discoinferno" – 3:43
2. "Antroposentrifugi" – 3:11 ("Anthropocentrifuge")
3. "Nimetön" – 3:35 ("Nameless")
4. "Aamutähti" – 4:31 ("Morning Star")
5. "Jerusalem" – 4:09
6. "Vallat ja väet" – 4:21 ("The Powers and the Crowds")
7. "Paha" – 2:21 ("Evil")
8. "Suljettu astia" – 3:34 ("Closed Container")
9. "Epäonnisten liikemiesten helvetti" – 3:23 ("The Hell of Unlucky Businessmen")
10. "Arcana" – 5:18
11. "Silmien ummistamisesta Nansenin galvanointiin" – 7:29 ("From the Closing of the Eyes to Galvanization of Nansen")

== Personnel ==
- A. W. Yrjänä – vocals, bass
- Janne Halmkrona – guitar
- Timo Rasio – guitar
- Pekka Kanniainen – drums

=== Guests ===
- Gabi Hakanen – producing, recording, mixing and co-arrangements
- Teropekka Virtanen – recording and mixing
- Pauli Saastamoinen – mastering
- Ann Bell Fell – vocals
- Martti Salminen – keyboards on choir arrangement on #5
- Heikki Keskinen – brass arrangement on #4
- Risto Salmi – soprano saxophone and recorder
- Mikko Mustonen – trombone
- Matti Lappalainen – trombone
- Jukka Tiirikainen – keyed trumpet
- Tommi Viertonen – English horn
- Antero Priha – trumpet
- Kampin Laulu Choir
- Timo Lehtovaara – choir conductor
- Juha Laakso – choir recording

== Singles ==
- "Nimetön" / "Seittemän Jeesusta" (October 1996)
- "Aamutähti" / "Aamutähti (remix)" (October 1996)
- "Vallat ja väet" / "Riitti" (January 1997)

== See also ==
- CMX discography
