= Aura (CMX album) =

Studio album by CMX
- Released: February 1994
- Recorded: October–December 1993
- Genre: Progressive rock
- Length: 55:47
- Label: Herodes/EMI
- Producer: Gabi Hakanen and A. W. Yrjänä

CMX chronology
Aurinko (1992)	Aura (1994)	Rautakantele (1995)

Professional ratings
Review scores
Source	Rating
Allmusic	4/5 stars

Aura (1994) is an album by the Finnish rock group CMX. The album gained the band its first near-hit single and some commercial airplay with "Ruoste". Although many people consider Aura to be the band's seminal record, at this point many older fans were already scoffing at the more streamlined, acoustic songs and mellow soundscapes as compared to their earlier hardcore steamrolling. However, Aura pretty much defines the band's sound up to this day, with a mixture of heavy and light elements and songwriting reminiscent of 1960s and 1970s progressive rock.

== Track listing ==
Songs written by A. W. Yrjänä, unless where noted. All lyrics by Yrjänä.

1. "Mikään ei vie sitä pois" – 3:18 ("Nothing Takes it Away")
2. "Sametinpehmeä" – 2:55 ("Soft as Velvet")
3. "Elokuun kruunu" – 4:32 ("August's Crown")
4. "Ruoste" – 4:01 ("Rust")
5. "Nainen tanssii tangoa" – 4:34 ("Woman Dances the Tango")
6. "Turkoosi" (Yrjänä, Halmkrona, Rasio, Kanniainen) – 4:20 ("Turquoise")
7. "Kultanaamio" – 4:56 ("Gold Mask")
8. "Raskas" – 4:12 ("Heavy")
9. "Talvipäivänseisaus" – 4:46 ("Winter Solstice")
10. "Työt ja päivät" – 5:17 ("Works and Days")
11. "Pilvien kuningas" (Yrjänä, Halmkrona, Rasio, Kanniainen) – 9:25 ("King of the Clouds")
12. "Aura" – 3:31 ("Aura")

== Credits ==
- A. W. Yrjänä – vocals, bass, acoustic guitar, producer
- Janne Halmkrona – guitars
- Timo Rasio – guitars
- Pekka Kanniainen – drums, percussion

=== Additional musicians ===
- Martti Salminen – keyboards
- Risto Salmi – saxophone
- Henna Valvanne – recorder
- Frida Segerstråle – vocals
- Kaarina Kilpiö – vocals

== Technical ==
- Veikko Huuskonen – string arrangements
- Gabi Hakanen – producer, engineer
- Dan Tigerstedt – mixing
- Pauli Saastamoinen – mastering
- Kain Ärjyvä – sleeve design
- Jouko Lehtola/Flaming Star – photography
- Inna Aarniala – photography
- Seppo Renvall – photography

== See also ==
- CMX discography
