= Talvikuningas =

Studio album by CMX
- Released: September 5, 2007
- Genre: Progressive rock
- Length: 62:02
- Label: Herodes/EMI
- Producer: Rake

CMX chronology
Pedot (2005)	Talvikuningas (2007)	Iäti (2010)

Professional ratings
Review scores
Source	Rating
Desibeli.net	5/5 stars
Nyt	5/5 stars
Rockmusica.net	5/5 stars
Rumba	2/5 stars
Soundi	3/5 stars

Talvikuningas (2007) is an album by the Finnish rock group CMX. The title is Finnish and translates to "The Winter King".

Talvikuningas is CMX's first concept album. Although the CD is divided into 12 tracks, they flow seamlessly into each other and the record is effectively one long song.

The first limited edition of 8 000 copies of Talvikuningas was released on September 5, 2007. This limited printing features special packaging and a 40-page booklet, which contains extensive artwork and the full libretto to the album. Digital downloads of Talvikuningas became available the same day. A regular CD version with ordinary jewel case packaging and reduced liner notes was released on 9 January 2008.

== Story ==
The album tells the same story as A. W. Yrjänä's yet-unfinished book. It's an epic science fiction story taking place in the 25th century. The album's sections are pieces of the saga of the Winter King. Some previous CMX songs, like Mekaanisten lintujen Puisto (The park of mechanical birds) and Sivu paholaisen päiväkirjasta (A page of the Devil's diary) can be linked to the story.

== Track listing ==
Music by A. W. Yrjänä except where noted. All lyrics by A. W. Yrjänä. All arrangements by CMX and Rake.

1. "Kaikkivaltias" – 10:26 ("The Almighty")
2. "Resurssikysymys" – 1:54 (Yrjänä/Halmkrona) ("A Matter of Resources")
3. "Pretoriaanikyborgit" – 5:50 (Yrjänä/Halmkrona/Rasio) ("Praetorian Cyborgs")
4. "Vallan haamut" – 5:31 ("Ghosts of Power")
5. "Tähtilaivan kapteeni" – 4:08 ("Captain of the Starship")
6. "Kosmologisen vakion laulu" – 3:52 ("Song of the Cosmological Constant")
7. "Parvatin tietäjä" – 4:26 ("The Sage of Parvati")
8. "Punainen komentaja" – 4:05 ("The Crimson Commander")
9. "Langennut valo" – 4:26 ("Fallen Light")
10. "Quanta" – 5:05 (Yrjänä/Rasio)
11. "Rusalkai" – 3:41 (Yrjänä/Halmkrona)
12. "Kaikkivaltiaan peili" – 8:31 ("Mirror of the Almighty")

Bonus tracks on the 10th anniversary vinyl edition (2017):

1. "Kuolemaantuomitut" - 4:06 ("Ones Condemned to Die")
2. "Mekaanisten lintujen puisto" - 7:45 ("Park of Mechanical Birds")

== Personnel ==
- A. W. Yrjänä – vocals, bass
- Janne Halmkrona – guitar
- Timo Rasio – guitar
- Tuomas Peippo – drums
- Rake (Rauli Eskolin) – keyboards, recording, production, mixing
- Pauli Saastamoinen – mastering
- Sami Saramäki – artwork and graphical design
- Gabi Hakanen – executive producer

== See also ==
- Talvikuningas in English
