= Kampin Laulu =

Finnish choir founded in 1990

- Choir
- Origin: Helsinki, Finland
- Founded: 1990
- Genre: Contemporary
- Members: Around 30
- Music director: Eric-Olof Söderström
- Website: http://www.kampinlaulu.fi/en/

Kampin Laulu is a Finnish chamber choir founded in 1990.

== Competitions ==
- International Anton Bruckner Choir Competition and Festival 2007 (Linz), winner of the chamber choir series
- Harald Andersén Chamber Choir Competition 2003 (Helsinki), III prize
- Cork International Choral Festival 1997, 1st place

== Selected premieres ==
- Juhani Komulainen: Keltainen nocturne (2000)
- Jaakko Mäntyjärvi: No More Shakespeare Songs? (2000)
- Jukka Linkola: Promootiokantaatti (2000)
- Juhani Komulainen: Cat Morgan Introduces Himself (1999)

== Discography ==
- Kivi sydämellä (2005)
- Verba sapientes sacra (2000)
- Kadonneet lahjat (1999)
- Something Rich and Strange (1998)
- guest choir on CMX records Rautakantele (1995), Discopolis (1996) and Dinosaurus Stereophonicus (2000)
