= Pedot =

Studio album by CMX
- Released: November 2, 2005
- Recorded: May 23 – September 25, 2005 at Inkfish Studios
- Genre: Progressive rock
- Length: 51:30
- Label: Herodes/EMI
- Producer: Rake

CMX chronology
Aion (2003)	Pedot (2005)	Talvikuningas (2007)

Professional ratings
Review scores
Source	Rating
Desibeli.net	4.5/5 stars
Rockmusica.net	3.5/5 stars
Soundi	3/5 stars

Pedot is the eleventh album of the Finnish rock band CMX. "Pedot" means "Beasts" in Finnish.

The opening track "Eteläisen tähtitaivaan kartoitus" breaks a CMX tradition of starting their albums with powerful rock songs. It is a minimalistic piano-based ballad with no drums. The title track is heavy, progressive and one of the very few tracks where Tuomas Peippo makes use of double bass pedals. "Uusi ihmiskunta" was the first single from the album (the second was "Kain"), and reached #1 on the Finnish singles chart.

== Track listing ==
All songs written by CMX with lyrics by A. W. Yrjänä.

1. "Eteläisen tähtitaivaan kartoitus" – 3:36 ("Mapping of the Southern Star Sky")
2. "Pedot" – 4:34 ("Beasts")
3. "Uusi ihmiskunta" – 3:31 ("New Mankind")
4. "Mustat siivet yli taivaan" – 4:22 ("Black Wings across the Sky")
5. "Kain" – 3:55 ("Cain")
6. "Suojelusperkele" – 4:10 ("Guardian Devil")
7. "Taivaanääreläiset" – 4:17 ("People of Heaven's End")
8. "Näkyvän valon olennot" – 2:44 ("Creatures of Visible Light")
9. "Tuulenkosija" – 6:16 ("Courter of the Wind")
10. "Syysmyrkkylilja" – 3:31 ("Autumn Poison Lily")
11. "Sanansaattaja" – 6:17 ("Messenger")
12. "Valoa nopeammat koneet" – 4:11 ("Superluminal Machines")

== Personnel ==
- A. W. Yrjänä - Vocals, Bass Guitar, Acoustic Guitar
- Janne Halmkrona - Guitars, Acoustic Guitar
- Timo Rasio - Guitars, Acoustic Guitar, Mandolin, Lap Steel
- Tuomas Peippo - Drums, Percussions
- Pentti Lahti - Flute
- Mikko Mustonen - Trombone
- Jyrki Sahla - Effects recording
- Kikke Heikkinen, Riitta Talasniemi - Background vocals
- Rake - Producer, Engineer, Mixing
- Rauli Eskolin - Keyboards, Programming
- Pauli Saastamoinen - Mastering
- Perttu Saksa - Photography
- Jussi S. Karjalainen - Sleeve Design
- Gabi Hakanen - Executive Producer
