= Musiikin ystävälliset kasvot =

Musiikin ystävälliset kasvot + 5

EP by CMX
- Released: May 1998
- Recorded: August–September 1991
- Genre: Pop/Rock
- Length: 17:16
- Label: Sad Vugum

Musiikin ystävälliset kasvot is an EP by CMX. It was recorded in 1991 to be released as a four song EP, but instead the title track was released as a single. The EP was finally released in 1998 under the name Musiikin ystävälliset kasvot + 5 and included six songs. The originally planned four song EP was released in 2002 as a part of Veljeskunta Gold.

The title track was re-recorded by the band in 1997 and released on the compilation Cloaca Maxima as "Musiikin ystävälliset kasvot '97".

== Track listing ==
=== "Musiikin ystävälliset kasvot" (single) ===
1. "Musiikin ystävälliset kasvot" – 4:01
2. "Vieraita avaruudesta (II)" – 3:39

=== Musiikin ystävälliset kasvot (original EP) ===
1. "Musiikin ystävälliset kasvot" – 4:01
2. "Vieraita avaruudesta (I)" – 2:54
3. "Polyhymnia" – 2:40
4. "Vieraita avaruudesta (II)" – 3:39

=== Musiikin ystävälliset kasvot + 5 ===
1. "Polyhymnia" – 2:40
2. "Vieraita avaruudesta (I)" – 2:54
3. "Vieraita avaruudesta (II)" – 3:39
4. "Musiikin ystävälliset kasvot" – 4:01
5. "Venehellä vaskisella" – 3:25
6. "Vuori" – 3:15

== Personnel ==
- A. W. Yrjänä – vocals, bass
- Janne Halmkrona – guitar
- Timo Rasio – guitar (except #6)
- Pasi Isometsä – guitar (on #6)
- Pekka Kanniainen – drums
