= Kultanaamio =

Single by CMX

from the album Aura
- Released: April 1994
- Recorded: October–December 1993
- Genre: Rock
- Length: 4:39
- Label: Herodes/EMI
- Songwriter: A. W. Yrjänä
- Producers: Gabi Hakanen and A. W. Yrjänä

CMX singles chronology
"Ruoste" (1994)	"Kultanaamio" (1994)	"Pelasta maailma" (1995)

Music video
- "Kultanaamio" on YouTube

"Kultanaamio" is the second single from the Finnish rock band CMX's 1994 album Aura. It also appears on the group's first compilation album Cloaca Maxima. "Kultanaamio" means "Golden Mask" in Finnish.

Helsingin Sanomat published in 2007 the top 50 Finnish rock songs as voted by readers. "Kultanaamio" placed third after "Moottoritie on kuuma" by Pelle Miljoona and "Get On" by Hurriganes. The top 10 also included CMX's previous single, "Ruoste".

== Interpretation ==
Music journalist Tero Valkonen wrote in 1998 an analysis of the lyrics of "Kultanaamio". It was published in the Rumba magazine, 24/1998, as a part of a column series about important Finnish rock lyricists. Valkonen argues that, even though the song is disguised as a catchy pop tune, it conseals "an immense amount of disappointment, suffering and falsehood" that may not be instantly noticeable. Indeed, the song starts with the phrase "I hate you."

== Track listing ==
1. "Kultanaamio" (single version) – 4:39
2. "Kultanaamio" (album version) – 4:56
3. "Keskellä" – 2:18

== Personnel ==
- A. W. Yrjänä – bass, vocals
- Janne Halmkrona – guitar
- Timo Rasio – guitar, backing vocals
- Pekka Kanniainen – drums
- Mara Salminen – keyboards
- Risto Salmi – saxophone
- Henna Valvanne
- Frida Segerstråle
- Kaarina Kilpiö

== See also ==
- CMX discography
