= Veljeskunta =

Studio album by CMX
- Released: 1991
- Recorded: 1991 Helsinki
- Genre: Indie rock Hardcore punk
- Length: 38:05
- Label: Bad Vugum
- Producer: A. W. Yrjänä, Janne Halmkrona

CMX chronology
Kolmikärki (1990)	Veljeskunta (1991)	Aurinko (1992)

Professional ratings
Review scores
Source	Rating
Allmusic	4/5 stars

Veljeskunta (1991) is an album by Finnish rock band CMX. Its name means "The Brotherhood" in Finnish.

The CD version of Veljeskunta also contains the Tanssitauti EP originally published in 1990. The gold version of the album, released in 2002 also contains CMX's earlier EP, Musiikin ystävälliset kasvot.

== Track listing ==
All songs written by A. W. Yrjänä and Janne Halmkrona with lyrics by A. W. Yrjänä.

1. "Kulje vasten"—1:25 ("Travel Against")
2. "Neljäs valtakunta"—2:34 ("The Fourth Reich")
3. "Metallipurkaus"—2:59 ("Metal Eruption")
4. "Kuu"—2:01 ("The Moon")
5. "Veljeskunta"—4:04 ("Brotherhood")
6. "Rytmitehdas"—2:30 ("Rhythm Factory")
7. "Helvetin hyvä paimen"—2:46 ("Good Shepherd of Hell" or "Hell of a Good Shepherd")
8. "Vaskiperse"—2:10 ("Copper Ass")
9. "Ääni ja vimma"—2:10 ("The Sound and the Fury")
10. "Tanssitauti"—2:12 ("Dance Disease, or St Vitus Dance")
11. "Kätketty kukka"—4:36 ("Hidden Flower")
12. "Enteitä"—2:19 ("Omens")
13. "Täynnä naisia"—2:32 ("Full of Women")
14. "Tulikiveä"—3:47 ("Brimstone")

== Credits ==
- A. W. Yrjänä -- vocals, bass, effects
- Janne Halmkrona -- guitar, ebow, keyboards
- Timo Rasio -- guitar
- Pekka Kanniainen -- drums, percussion

=== Visitors ===
- Kikke Heikkinen -- background vocals
- Kim Johannes—keyboards
