= Isohaara =

Studio album by CMX
- Released: 2 August 2002
- Recorded: 2 January – 25 June 2002
- Genre: Alternative rock
- Length: 47:15
- Label: Herodes/EMI
- Producer: Gabi Hakanen

CMX chronology
Dinosaurus Stereophonicus (2000)	Isohaara (2002)	Aion (2003)

Professional ratings
Review scores
Source	Rating
Desibeli.net:	4/5 stars
Helsingin Sanomat	4/5 stars
Mesta.net	4/5 stars
Noise.fi	4/5 stars
Rytmi	4.5/5 stars
Soundi	4/5 stars

Isohaara is the ninth studio album by the Finnish rock group CMX. The album is named after Isohaara power plant in Keminmaa. The band spent six months in the studio because of the chosen songwriting method: the songs were written and rehearsed at the studio under constant perfecting and re-arranging. Musically, the album is lighter and more accessible than its predecessor, the over 100-minute Prog-epoch Dinosaurus Stereophonicus.

== Track listing ==
All songs written and arranged by CMX with lyrics by A. W. Yrjänä.

1. "Päänsärkijä" – 4:31 "Headbreaker"
2. "Pohjoista leveyttä" – 3:20 "Northern Latitude"
3. "Veitsenterä" – 4:33 "Knife's Blade"
4. "Minne paha haudattiin" – 5:31 "Where Evil Was Buried"
5. "Isohaara" – 3:39
6. "Revontulten repijä" – 6:13 "Ripper of Aurora Borealis"
7. "Minun sydämeni on särkynyt" – 3:58 "My Heart is Broken"
8. "Post mortem" – 2:55
9. "Lihan syvyyksiin" – 3:51 "Into the Depths of Flesh"
10. "Silmien takana" – 4:05 "Behind the Eyes"
11. "Tuulilukko" – 4:24 "Windlock"

== Personnel ==
- A. W. Yrjänä – Vocals, bass guitar, harmonica, harmonium
- Janne Halmkrona – Guitar, keyboards
- Timo Rasio – Guitar
- Tuomas Peippo – Drums

=== Guests ===
- Music class 4C of the Suutarila elementary school – Choir on #5
- Ismo Rajaniemi – Choir conductor on #5

=== Technical ===
- Gabi Hakanen – Producing, recording and mixing
- Illusion Rake – Piano (Track 6), Recording and mixing of vocals and co-production on #4
- Mika Jussila – Mastering

== Singles ==
- "Pohjoista leveyttä" (June 2002)
  - Exclusive B-sides: "Kolme kimaltavaa neitoa" and "Väkivallan moottorit"
- "Minun sydämeni on särkynyt" (July 2002)
  - Exclusive B-sides: "Epäluoma" and "Helevetinkone"
- "Minne paha haudattiin" (October 2002)
  - Exclusive B-sides: "Ehdota jotain parempaa" and "Kvartetto rock-yhtyeelle ja solistille, op. 1"
- "Silmien takana" (promosingle, January 2003)
