= Kaaos =

Finnish hardcore punk band

Background information
- Origin: Tampere, Finland
- Genre: Hardcore punk
- Years active: 1980–1985, 1999-2005
- Past members: Jakke; Epe; Pexte; Purtsi; Jan; Sepa; Rintsu; Pena; Kake; Bansku; Timpa; Jone; Jaska; Nappi; Sidney; Vesku; Poko; Kalle; Tomppa

Kaaos was a Finnish hardcore punk band from Tampere, Finland. Formed in March 1980, they were one of the first hardcore punk bands in Finland to release a record. Though their lineup has changed frequently through the years, the band is somewhat active through the years. Only the band's guitarist Jakke (who later became the vocalist) remained as the original member and grew to become the center figure of Kaaos.

While their early songs became known to be focused on the local authorities (the police) they always criticized not only the government, but also how different beliefs and religions are used to justify war and the suffering war causes. They also sang about day to day violence they had to meet on the street as punks in their day and many other personal topics, yet keeping true to the anarcho punk view.

== History ==
=== Pre-Kaaos ===
Jakke started out as a guitar player in a band called Porttikielto according to his own words back in 1978. They played a gig or two at the early Tampere punk club called "Safety pins", which was the place where more better known Tampere punk bands like Eppu Normaali, Sensuuri and Karanteeni started.

Later on, "older" punks from the band "Nivelreuma" asked him to join a new band called Amiraali Nelson, named after Admiral Nelson and the brand of beer named after him which was popular at the time. This band went on to record one song on a compilation album called Kolme vuotta myöhemmin ("Three years later") in 1980.

=== Early Kaaos ===
In early 1980 Jakke renamed the band Kaaos ("Chaos"). The shift was to make sure that no new wave type of influences or people in the band would be allowed. Although Crass was already an influence, hardcore as such was not so at that point. However, the band started to play faster and more chaotic and adopted the studded leather jacket, spiky haired and mohawked image many would emulate later on quite quickly. At this time, this was unheard of even in the Finnish punk scene which was in the midst of evolving from "punk" into new wave into "Finnish rock". This harsher sound and look was just not something anybody expected.

In the fall of 1981 the group recorded a split EP with Cadgers (who later evolved into Riistetyt). Their side of the EP, though re-presses might omit the name, is called "Kytät on natsisikoja" ("Cops are Nazi pigs") featuring the song of the same name, which has been a Finnish hardcore classic and a definitive song of the genre ever since. However, Jakke the vocalist of the band does not sing on the song or on the recording. He did, however, play the guitar.

=== Kaaos in 1982 ===
After many line up changes, which were to follow the band until the end, Kaaos released the EP "Totaalinen Kaaos" ("Total chaos") which is, by many, considered to be their finest release and, in the Finnish punk culture, is one of the most definitive records of the "82-hardcore" style of Finnish hardcore, named after the year this and some other Finnish hardcore punk records came out, all released by local independent labels. At this point, Kaaos also became known outside Finland mostly because of tape trading and for the fact that their releases were sold and traded abroad. However this did not help them back home. Gigs were scarce and their next release Valtio tuhoaa, ei rakenna ("The government destroys, does not build") was not released until the nineties.

=== Last years of the original Kaaos ===
In 1984 the band released their only real full-length album, Ristiinnaulittu Kaaos ("The crucified Chaos") and a split LP with Terveet Kädet, although Terveet Kädet later made a point about never wanting to play in Tampere because bands like Kaaos rejected their too "humorous" lyrics, preferring to sing more about topics related to anarchism. Since Terveet Kädet has played in Tampere later on, this feud might have been settled.

They also recorded their "last" EP, Nukke ("The doll"), which was released eight years later. At this point the sound of the band had perhaps evolved to a point that Jakke and the bass player Nappi formed the band Kuolleet Kukat which had a style more in the vein of Amebix and post punk. They released one EP and recorded another, before also disbanding. Then re-surfacing in the nineties to record new material, then disbanding again. In the late nineties and early 2000 Jakke and Nappi also had a band called Positive/Negative which played more straight forward, crust influenced anarcho punk.

=== Last incarnation ===
In November 1999, Kaaos played a show in Lepakko, the former squat in Helsinki where they and many other early hardcore bands had shared the stage in the early eighties. The gig was the very last gig before the building was demolished to make way for an office building for Nokia. Even though the band shared the stage with such contemporaries as Riistetyt, Appendix and Terveet Kädet, the "original line up" did not manage to play pretty well and was considered a "novelty act" at best and a "disgrace" by those who saw them. Despite all this, the gig was a starting point of a revival of many old school Finnish hardcore bands, even to many who did not play there that night.

Kaaos came up with a new line up that after doing a split EP with Svart Aggression and some compilation tracks, put out the mini LP Ismit ("Isms"), delivering the Kaaos sound but not trying to update much to the "crustie" style they missed out on themselves but also helped to influence.

After playing and touring, this incarnation of Kaaos also deteriorated. The last gig Kaaos ever had was at the release party of the book "Parasta lapsille" ("The best for children") in October 2007 in Tavastia. This was again with the "original line up" that was not allowed to rehearse, hampering the sound of the gig. At the end of the show, Jakke also gave a long speech nobody could hear since he did not seem to realize the microphone was cut off. He died on 29 November 2007 of alcohol-related causes at the age of 42.

== Discography ==
- Kaaos/Cadgers "Kytät on Natsisikoja/ Kaaosta Tää Maa Kaipaa" split 7-inch 1981
- Totaalinen Kaaos EP 1982
- Valtio tuhoaa, ei rakenna EP 1983
- Riistinaulittu Kaaos LP 1984
- Nukke EP 1985
- Kaaos/Terveet Kädet So Much Fun LP 1984
- Kaaos/Svart Aggression split-ep 2000
- Ismit 10-inch/CD 2001

=== Compilations ===
- Systeemi ei toimi EP 1982
- Papi, Queens, Reichkanzlers & Presidennti EP 1982
- Propaganda LP - Russia Bombs Finland LP 1982 (CD 1995)
- Kaaos-fanzine kokoelmakasetti 2 (only cassette) 1983
- Finnish Spunk /Hardbeat LP 1983 (= HARDCORE HOLOCAUST, bootleg LP -98)
- Yalta Hi-Life LP 1984
- Rare 2 EP 1990
- Promotion only kokoelma CD 1994
- 72 Golden Hits kokoelma CD 1995
- Destroy Power CD 1996
- The Tribute to Kaaos - The Chaos Continues 2×7″ EP 1996
- Lepakon hautajaiset Live 12.-13.11.1999 CD 2000
- Rajoitettu Ydinsota - Tribute to Rattus CD 2000
- Perkeleen punkit CD 2001
- A Monumental Destruição Da Vida... CD 2001
- Tampere/Portland EP 2002
- Perkeleen Punkit vol. 2 CD 2002
- Totaalinen Kaaos

== Bibliography ==
- Suomipunk 1977–1998 (Jarkko Kuivanen, Yle); ISBN 9789529108039
- Parasta lapsille - Suomipunk 1977-1984 (Mika Saastamoinen, Johnny Kniga); ISBN 9789510323793
