= Juhani Komulainen =

Finnish composer (born 1953)

Juhani Komulainen (born 22 April 1953) is a Finnish composer of modern classical music. He lives in Helsinki.

== Biography ==
Juhani Komulainen was born in Jämsänkoski, and has studied composition at the University of Miami in the U.S., and with Einojuhani Rautavaara in Finland. He gained a reputation in the 1990s through his successful participation in several Finnish and international competitions.

The compositions of Juhani Komulainen are performed at international music festivals, choral competitions and workshops. He is working extensively with Finnish choirs and vocal groups creating a wide range of new choral compositions which have been recently premiered at concerts and recordings by numerous choirs including Academic Female Choir Lyran, The EOL Chamber Choir, Vocal Ensemble Fiori, Jubilate Chamber Choir, Kampin Laulu chamber choir, Vocal Ensemble Lumen Valo, Tapiola Choir and Liiton Miehet.

== Selected works ==
Choral Works: Mixed Choir

- Salve, flos et decor (Tervehditty ollos, armoitettu)
- Cat Morgan Introduces Himself. 1st prize in the South Coast Choral Society Composition Competition, California, U.S., 1986
- Sade (Rain). Text by Leena Saarisalo ( in Finnish )
- Three sonnets of Shakespeare
- Four ballads of Shakespeare. 1st prize in the composition competition of the Helsinki Chapter of SULASOL, 1994
- Herra, minun valoni (Lord, You are my light)
- Satu (Saga)
- Matka Eedeniin (Journey to Eden)
- Fantaisies Decoratives I (Le Panneau - The Panel)
- Fantaisies Decoratives II (Les Ballons - The Balloons)
- Cycle sur St. Martin
- Haltian herätys (Awakening of the elf)
- Keltainen Nocturne (Yellow Nocturne)
- Vaellus (Journey)
- The Song of Solomon
- Herra kanssas olkohon
- Jesu Christe pie
- Shall I compare thee...
- Nyt ilovirttä veisaten (In dulci jubilo)
- Nyt sieluni ylös (Siionin virsi)
- Särkyköön mun sydämeni (Siionin virsi)

Choral Works: Treble Voices

- Muurahaisten laulu (The Song of the Ants)
- Sade (Rain). Text by Leena Saarisalo (in Finnish)
- Antakaa lasten tulla (Let the children come). 1st prize in the 1992 Lohtaja Church Music Festival composition competition
- Kuin sinapinsiemen. 1st prize in the 1992 Lohtaja Church Music Festival composition competition
- Kudontalaulu (Knitting Song)
- Polulla (On the trail)
- Muisto (Memory)
- Suvikuvia (Summer Scenes)
- Shakesperean Settings
- Syyskesän ilta (The late summer evening)
- Vocalise
- The Tide Rises, the Tide Falls
- Kaksi yösonettia (Two Nocturnal Sonnets)
- Call of the sea

Choral Works: Male Choir

- Nouskaa te ruhtinaat
- Metsä palaa (The forest is burning)
- Metsässä (In the forest)
- Three Landscapes of T. S. Eliot
- most people
- Hiljainen kumina syvällä ylläni

Works for Choir and Orchestra

- Mysterium

Works for Soloist, Choir and Orchestra or Ensemble

- Profeetan kutsuminen (Calling of a Prophet)
- Sytytän kynttilän (Lighting a candle)

Works for String Orchestra

- Bothnian Dance and Ballad

Electro-acoustic Works

- Kalevala

Works for Solo Instrument

- Ballade for piano
- Aria magico
- homage

Chamber Works

- Impressioni
- The Ides of March

Arrangements

- Jesper Swedberg (1694): Lova Gud i himmelshöjd
