= Aurinko =

Smägä

Studio album by CMX
- Released: 6.7.6067
- Recorded: June – August 1992
- Genre: Progressive rock
- Length: 44:10
- Label: Herodes/EMI
- Producers: Gabi Hakanen and A. W. Yrjänä

CMX chronology
Veljeskunta (1991)	Smägä (6067)	Aura (1994)

Professional ratings
Review scores
Source	Rating
Allmusic	4.5/5 stars
Rockmusica.net	4/5 stars

Aurinko (1992) is an album by the Finnish rock group CMX. The word "Aurinko" means "The Sun" in Finnish. The album cover depicts a cross section of a pineapple.

The album was the first to mark a considerable move towards more mainstream rock from the band's hardcore roots, with more streamlined approach to songwriting and distinctibly more vocal singing style in most tracks. Also, Aurinko featured one of their biggest future live hits, "Ainomieli".

In a City magazine interview in 2005, when asked about which CMX song should never have been made, A. W. Yrjänä has said: "On Aurinko there's 'Timanttirumpu', that makes no sense at all. It's just growling and drum playing".

== Track listing ==
All songs written by A. W. Yrjänä and Janne Halmkrona with lyrics by A. W. Yrjänä.

1. "Pyhiinvaeltaja" – 3:12 ("Pilgrim")
2. "Härjät" – 3:45 ("Bulls")
3. "Aivosähköä" – 3:29 ("Brain Electricity")
4. "Katariinanpyörä" – 2:30 ("Catherine Wheel")
5. "Todellisuuksien yleiset luokat I-IV" – 3:19 ("Universal Classes of Reality I-IV")
6. "Tähteinvälinen" – 5:10 ("Interstellar")
7. "Manalainen" – 3:21 ("Underworder")
8. "Ainomieli" – 3:28 ("Aino-Mind")
9. "Kaksi jokea" – 3:49 ("Two Rivers")
10. "Timanttirumpu" – 3:13 ("Diamond Drum")
11. "Marian ilmestys" – 5:53 ("Revelation of Mary")
12. "Yö ei ole pimeä päivä" – 3:01 ("The Night is not a Dark Day")

== Credits ==
- A. W. Yrjänä - Vocals, Bass guitar, Producer
- Janne Halmkrona - Guitars
- Timo Rasio - Guitars
- Pekka Kanniainen - Drums
- Gabi Hakanen - Producer, Engineer, Mixing
- Anna Kuoppamäki
- Costi Suhonen
- Kikke Heikkinen
- Wagner Keppi
- Mika Paloniemi
- Tapani Rinne
- Kosonen
- Njuga Mol'ubata
- Martti Salminen
- Kain Ärjyvä - Sleeve Design, Photography
- Jolle Penttilä - Photography
