= Raivo (EP) =

EP by CMX
- Released: February 1989
- Recorded: December 5–7, 1988
- Genre: Hardcore punk
- Length: 12:48
- Label: Bad Vugum
- Producer: CMX

Raivo (Rage) is the second EP by Finnish rock band CMX. It is seen as their heaviest, most aggressive hardcore recording. One song, "Hiki", made it to their 1997 compilation album Cloaca Maxima. The Raivo EP, along with Johannes Kastaja, is included on the 2002 re-release Kolmikärki Gold.

== Track listing ==
All songs by A. W. Yrjänä.

1. "Lintu" ("The Bird") —2:10
2. "Rituaali" ("Ritual") —0:54
3. "Syvä vesi" ("Deep Water") —0:48
4. "Jumalan ruoska" ("Whip Of The God") —1:01
5. "Raivo" ("Rage") —1:23
6. "Hiki" ("Sweat") —2:04
7. "Kolme näkyä" ("Three Sights") —1:16
8. "Anathema"—1:15
9. "Maailmoiden välissä" ("Between The Worlds") —1:57

== Personnel ==
- A. W. Yrjänä – vocals, bass
- Kimmo Suomalainen – guitar
- Pekka Kanniainen – drums
