= Vainajala =

Studio album by CMX
- Released: October 1998
- Recorded: July – August 1998, in a cottage in Ylösjärvi
- Genre: Progressive rock
- Length: 48:04
- Label: Herodes/EMI
- Producer: Billy Gould

CMX chronology
Discopolis (1996)	Vainajala (1998)	Dinosaurus Stereophonicus (2000)

Professional ratings
Review scores
Source	Rating
AllMusic	link

Vainajala (1998) is an album by the Finnish rock group CMX. Vainaja is Finnish for a dead person, Vainajala meaning a name of a place inhabited by the dead.

The style that Vainajala was produced in was highly exceptional; The band went to a small cottage in the middle of Lapland with mobile recording equipment and producer Billy Gould, who had previously shown interest in the band largely unknown outside Finland. Recording Vainajala took only two weeks, much less than the recording time for any of their other recent albums. The album was later finished at the Herodes studio in Helsinki, but the musical style of the album is still very minimalistic. Only a few visiting artists performed on the album.

== Track listing ==
All songs written by CMX with lyrics by A. W. Yrjänä.

1. "Iskusävelmä" – 3:38 ("Hit Song")
2. "Surunmurhaaja" – 3:47 ("Murderer of Sorrow")
3. "Vainajala" – 6:07
4. "Vierasta viljaa" – 4:14 ("Foreign Grain")
5. "Ei yksikään" – 3:26 ("Not One")
6. "Taivaan lapset" – 3:50 ("Children of Heaven")
7. "Sillanrakentaja" – 4:14 ("Bridgebuilder")
8. "Laulu palavasta linnusta" – 4:00 ("Song about a Burning Bird")
9. "Eufrat" – 1:29
10. "Kirjeitä paratiisista" – 3:56 ("Letters from Paradise")
11. "Arkangeli" – 3:17 ("Arkhangelsk")
12. "Vanha talvitie" – 5:59 ("Old Winter Road")

=== The band ===
- A. W. Yrjänä – vocals, bass guitar
- Janne Halmkrona – guitars
- Timo Rasio – guitars
- Tuomas Peippo – drums

=== Guests ===
- Billy Gould – producer
- Martti Salminen – keyboard, vocals
- Susanna Eronen – vocals
- Teropekka Virtanen – recording, mixing
- Mika Jussila – mastering
- Janne Uotila – sleeve design

== Singles ==
- "Ei yksikään" / "Linnunhammas (live)" (October 1998)
- "Sillanrakentaja" / "Punainen nro 6" (November 1998)
- "Surunmurhaaja" / "π" / "Aivosähköä (live)" (March 1999)
