= Kaikki hedelmät =

Compilation album by CMX
- Released: November 5, 2008
- Recorded: 1993–2005
- Genre: Progressive rock
- Label: Herodes/EMI
- Producer: see individual albums

Kaikki hedelmät (All the Fruits) is the third compilation album by the Finnish rock group CMX. It was published on November 5, 2008. Unlike previous two triple compilation albums it concentrates on hits and singles. It includes two new songs that are to be released also separately.

== Track listing ==
=== CD 1 ===
1. Kivinen kirja (previously unreleased)
2. Ainomieli
3. Elokuun kruunu
4. Ruoste
5. Kultanaamio
6. Kirosäkeet
7. Pelasta maailma
8. Nimetön
9. Aamutähti
10. Vallat ja väet
11. Siivekäs
12. Ei yksikään
13. Sillanrakentaja

=== CD 2 ===
1. Rautalankaa (previously unreleased)
2. Jatkuu niin kuin sade
3. Meidän syntimme
4. Puuvertaus
5. Pohjoista leveyttä
6. Minne paha haudattiin
7. Minun sydämeni on särkynyt
8. Silmien takana
9. Melankolia
10. Palvelemaan konetta
11. Kauneus pettää
12. Uusi ihmiskunta
13. Kain
14. Kuolemaantuomitut
