= Johannes Kastaja =

EP by CMX
- Released: 1987
- Recorded: Summer 1987
- Genre: Hardcore punk
- Length: 10:05
- Label: P.Tuotanto
- Producer: CMX

Johannes Kastaja (John the Baptist) is the first EP by CMX. It, with Raivo, is included on Kolmikärki Gold, the 2002 re-release of the band's debut album. "Lapsi" became something of a cult song, with controversial lyrics about child sexual abuse.

The cover art is made by Läjä Äijälä.

== Personnel ==
- A. W. Yrjänä -- vocals, bass
- Kimmo Suomalainen -- guitar
- Pekka Kanniainen -- drums

== Track listing ==
All songs written by A. W. Yrjänä, except where noted.

1. "Mielipuolinen rakkaus" ("Insane Love") (Kanniainen, Suomalainen, Yrjänä) -- 1:30
2. "Lapsi" ("The Child") —1:46
3. "Siunattu otsa" ("The Blessed Forehead") (Kanniainen, Suomalainen, Yrjänä) -- 1:58
4. "My Tribe"—0:54
5. "On the Wing"—0:59
6. "Shaman's Prayer"—2:58
