= Dinosaurus Stereophonicus =

Studio album by CMX
- Released: October 2000
- Recorded: May–August, 2000 at Inkfish Studios
- Genre: Progressive rock
- Length: 118:54
- Labels: Herodes, EMI
- Producers: Gabi Hakanen and Illusion Rake

CMX chronology
Vainajala (1998)	Dinosaurus Stereophonicus (2000)	Isohaara (2002)

Professional ratings
Review scores
Source	Rating
Allmusic	2.5/5 stars
Soundi	4/5 stars

Dinosaurus Stereophonicus is the eighth album by the Finnish rock group CMX, released in 2000. It was recorded after the band had decided to stop touring and become a full-time studio band. The decision only lasted until 2002.

The two-hour-long double album is heavily influenced by 1970s progressive rock, such as King Crimson, Pink Floyd and Yes. Many of the songs contain long solos and odd time signatures. Keyboards are also an important part of the album's sound.

Despite being over six minutes long, "Myrskyn ratsut" was CMX's first number one single. String instruments and steel guitar can be heard on the slow, calm and melodic song. Shortly thereafter, "Jatkuu niinkuin sade" became the second CMX song to top the Finnish singles chart. Dinosaurus Stereophonicus was certified gold quickly after its release.

== Track listing ==
All songs written by CMX with lyrics by A. W. Yrjänä.

=== Disc 1 ===
1. "Kreetan härkä" – 4:58 (instrumental) ("Bull of Crete")
2. "Kansantalouden saavutusten näyttely" – 4:12 ("Exhibition of National Economy's Achievements")
3. "Ei koskaan" – 6:21 ("Never")
4. "Iliman pielet" – 4:21 ("Frames of the Air")
5. "Ohjelmansiirtoketjun mittaustauko" – 2:24 (instrumental) "Measuring Break of the Programme Shift Process")
6. "Pelon enkeli" – 5:36 ("Angel of Fear")
7. "Loputtomasti samaa" – 5:43 ("Endlessly Same")
8. "Ilmestyskirjanpitäjä" – 1:57 ("Accountant of the Book of Revelations")
9. "Kylmänmarja" – 8:59 ("Cold's Berry")
10. "Baikonur" – 10:08
11. "Negatiivinen alkusoitto" – 1:18 (instrumental) ("Negative Overture")

=== Disc 2 ===
1. "Jatkuu niinkuin sade" – 4:29 ("Goes on Like the Rain")
2. "Tuonen lintu" – 5:29 ("Bird of the Underworld")
3. "Luuhamara" – 4:18 ("Bone Poll")
4. "Tämän runon tahtoisin unohtaa" – 4:47 ("I Would Like to Forget This Poem")
5. "Kultaiset portaat" – 5:27 ("Golden Stairs")
6. "Meidän syntimme" – 4:52 ("Our Sins")
7. "Myrskyn ratsut" – 6:27 ("Steeds of Squall")
8. "Karsikkopuu" – 5:33 ("Tree of the Dead")
9. "Olkoon täysi sinun maljasi" – 10:00 ("Let Thy Cup be Full")
10. "Suurta yötä päin" – 3:40 ("Towards the Great Night")
11. "Tähdet sylissään" – 7:55 ("Stars in her Bosom")

== Personnel ==
- A. W. Yrjänä - vocals, bass
- Janne Halmkrona - guitars
- Timo Rasio - guitars
- Tuomas Peippo - drums
- Gabi Hakanen - producer, engineer, mixing
- Illusion Rake - producer, engineer, mixing
- Teropekka Virtanen - engineer
- Mika Jussila - mastering
- Vincent B - sleeve art/design
- Arto Kinnunen - sleeve art/design
- Ari Talusén - photography
- Martti Salminen - keyboards
- Ann Bell Fell
- Aki Eronen
- Risto Salmi
- Kampin Laulu choir
