= Pohjannaula =

Finnish folk rock music band

Pohjannaula was a Finnish folk rock music band formed in 1995. The band was split up in February 2011.

== Band members ==
- Samuli Mäkisalo – vocals and guitar
- Juha-Matti Pesonen – guitar
- Tomi Rikkola – viola
- Tuomo Kuure – bass
- Hermanni Peltola – drums

=== Former members ===
- Juha Menna – drums
- Antero Aunesluoma – bass

== Releases ==
=== Albums ===
- 1998: Kivi
- 2000: Pässinpää
- 2002: Päreinä
- 2005: Tätä kaikki kaipaa

=== Singles and EPs ===
- 1998: Halajan
- 1998: Kun juoksu loppuu / Pirunpelto
- 2000: Veistäjä / Sielulintu
- 2000: Jääkannel
- 2001: Liekki
- 2002: Kuljettu matka
- 2005: Ei ole tapana
- 2005: Lumottu yö / Pinnan alla
