= Propaganda (2012 film) =

New Zealand documentary film

- Directed by: Slavko Martinov
- Starring: Eugene Chang; Susannah Kenton
- Release date: July 13, 2012 (New Zealand)
- Running time: 95 minutes
- Country: New Zealand
- Languages: Korean, English

Propaganda is a 2012 New Zealand documentary, propaganda or mockumentary film directed by Slavko Martinov. It presents itself from the perspective of the North Korean government, portraying Western media and culture as forms of propaganda. Before its first official appearance at a film festival (IDFA) in November 2012, it appeared on YouTube as part of a social experiment, where it was presented as a genuine North Korean propaganda movie. The hoax was revealed when the director submitted the film to festivals under his own name.
