= Propaganda Records =

Finnish music label

- Founded: 1981
- Founder: Heikki Vilenius
- Distributor(s): Playground Music Scandinavia; Self-distributed (worldwide)
- Genre: Hardcore punk Punk rock Post-hardcore; Indie rock Alternative rock
- Country of origin: Finland
- Location: Hämeenlinna; Häme
- Official website: www.propaganda.fi

Propaganda Records company and Propaganda label are an independent Finnish record company and a record label established in 1981. Since the beginning Helsinki-based Propaganda specialized in independent punk music and hardcore. The label dominated the Finnish hardcore punk and underground scene from the early 1980s until 1986. Releases were soon distributed in West Germany, Brazil and the United States. They soon began reissues in West Germany.

== Propaganda history ==
The Finnish Propaganda Records was founded in the beginning of 1981 in Helsinki by Heikki Vilenius. The actual label logo Propaganda had already been created in the summer of 1979 for the Propaganda fanzine issues.

Soon after the first releases the founder had a continuing radio program at Finnish Yle with name Suomirock. The name has become as an important part of meaning of Finnish rock within the later decades.

Quite soon after the first Propaganda compilation album, Propaganda - Russia bombs Finland, in 1982 they announced co-operation with rockabilly shop Jensen Studio and Rockphone with a show at Lepakkoluola, the former addict flophouse, with a pile of performing bands. Rockphone traded Propaganda issues well and imported actual punk rock until The Lords of the New Church from London via aeroplane. Later Propaganda arranged several hardcore shows in the year by the same way. Puntala-rock 1983 was one of the same kind of festivals around Finland. The event has returned latest since 2000 and has always performers around the world.

In the late 1982 album issues Valtion vankina (As Prisoner of State) from Riistetyt and Ei raha oo mun valuuttaa (Money Is Not My Currency) from Appendix were just what was needed to offer a total shot of Finnish hardcore. A small flat record Totaalinen Kaaos (Total Chaos] by Kaaos was enough for a while.

Soon in 1983 the other hillbilly Herbert Egoldt from West German Rock-O-Rama Records was interested to reissue and issue a couple of dozen albums from Finnish Propaganda Records. If the reason began from Egoldt's rockabilly years with John Peel in Britain since the late 1960s or comment by John Peel, who wrote to Egoldt in May 1980: "One thing about the records. Why do German singers sing in English? Is it because it is fashionable? Or is it a marketing consideration? Whichever it is, I think they should sing in German anyway." Now those were singing in Finnish in West Germany and in Western Europe. That will make a lot of sense. The Bastards were among the first ones to tour in Europe. Since beginning of 1984 the albums were distributed by new company the German SPV GmbH to all of Western Europe.

In the same time in 1983 Propaganda was already like hot stuff in Western countries as the American Maximum Rocknroll from San Francisco wrote reviews and articles. As the albums were at Top 10 lists on couple of dozens MRR radio stations all over United States including the university stations in many states.

Later Terveet Kädet appeared on Maximum Rocknroll international punk and hardcore compilation album, Welcome to 1984. But as much earlier The Bastards reached appearing on World Class Punk compilation from ROIR with 1982 material. Propaganda was a moment earlier for a while a local company for Reachout International Records in Finland as Mykel Board was visited in Finland and made a promotion at Finnish broadcasting company Yle.

Mykel Board was as well a columnist from Maximum Rocknroll, but his own home district was at New York City like for his own company Seidboard International and for Neil Cooper (ROIR). In 1984 changed Riistetyt and The Holy Dolls were the first ones to tour around the United States from the east coast to the west coast with 30 gigs. They played at Los Angeles during 1984 Summer Olympics with Dead Kennedys at Olympic Hall, Los Angeles Memorial Sports Arena. Italian Raw Power was the other band with the Riistetyt during the tour.

The Brazilian punks were very keen on that foreign material, fashion stuff and bands. Later Terveet Kädet was reissued there. It took until 2001 as Riistetyt toured in Brazil for the first time. Since then there have been a lot of large tours around Brazil.

In the late 1980s Propaganda made more Suomirock, melodic rock, blues rock and made the incoming of Finnish hard rock.

== The next century ==
Since 1993 have been many reissues on many labels and a pile of new bands performing with various music genres.

== Propaganda fanzine ==
Propaganda magazine, fanzine started in Finland in early 1979 and was in the beginning issued from Häme. Later in 1980 it was located in northern Helsinki. A dozen of different zines have been reissued with reissued vinyl records past the last two decades in Germany and Finland.

During a couple of last years in Helsinki founded Oranssi ry. has made an archive concerning around 300 fanzine issues from Finland and including yet some Propaganda issues. The operation is financed by the Finnish government via Ministry of Education and Culture and is run with Suomen Jazz and Pop Arkisto (JAPA). JAPA has 300 meters as archived material and it is administering DigiWiki-portal. The issues are still alive.

== Co-operatives ==
- Rock-O-Rama Records, West Germany
- Rough Trade, United States
- Finnlevy, Finland
- Kråklund Records, Finland
- Höhnie Records, Germany
- Havoc Records, United States
- Playground Music Scandinavia, Scandinavia
- Svart Records, Finland

== Some of the roster ==
- Appendix
- Kaaos
- Terveet Kädet
- Riistetyt
- Bastards
- Pyhät Nuket
- Holy Dolls
- Nuket
- Massacre
- 013
- Korroosio
- Plastic Tears
- Tinneri
- Dave Forestfield
- Jussi Kettu
- Rudi
- Kansan Uutiset
- Vaurio
- Destrucktions
