= Rautakantele =

Album by CMX

Studio album by CMX
- Released: March 1995
- Recorded: Fall 1994
- Genre: Progressive rock
- Length: 48:48
- Label: Herodes/EMI
- Producer: A. W. Yrjänä

CMX chronology
Aura (1994)	Rautakantele (1995)	Discopolis (1996)

Professional ratings
Review scores
Source	Rating
Allmusic	2.5/5 stars

Rautakantele is a 1995 album by the Finnish rock group CMX. "Rautakantele" is Finnish and means "The Iron Kantele".

== Track listing ==
All songs by CMX with lyrics by A. W. Yrjänä.

1. "Rautakantele" – 4:31 ("Iron Kantele")
2. "Yöllisiä" – 3:18 ("Nocturnals")
3. "Palvonnan eleitä" – 3:03 ("Gestures of Worship")
4. "Talviunia" – 3:29 ("Winterdreams")
5. "Kirosäkeet" – 4:10 ("Curse Verses")
6. "Ennustaja" – 3:54 ("Fortune Teller")
7. "Päivälintu" – 3:48 ("Daybird")
8. "G" – 3:37
9. "Pelasta maailma" – 4:15 ("Save the World")
10. "Linnunhammas" – 3:18 ("Bird's Tooth")
11. "Veden ääri" – 3:06 ("Water's Edge")
12. "Pirunmaitoa" – 6:09 ("Devil's Milk")
13. "Hiljaisuuteen" – 2:04 ("Into Silence")

== Personnel ==
- A. W. Yrjänä - vocals, bass
- Janne Halmkrona - guitars
- Timo Rasio - guitars
- Pekka Kanniainen - drums

=== Guests ===
- Ilkka Herkman - Engineer
- Dan Tigersted - Mixing
- Tuula Lehtinen - Sleeve art/design
- Timo Lehtinen - Photography
- Petri Artturi Asikainen - Photography
- Tuula Penttinen - Sleeve art/design
- Mara Salminen - keyboards, vocals
- Susanna Eronen - vocals
- Satu Sopanen - kantele
- Risto Salmi - soprano saxophone
- Kikke Heikkinen - vocals
- Kaarina Kilpiö - percussion
- Keijo Puumalainen - percussion
- Ville Leppänen - slide guitar
- Kampin Laulu - choir
