= Riistetyt =

Finnish hardcore punk band from Tampere

- Origin: Tampere, Finland
- Genres: Hardcore punk; punk rock
- Years active: 1981–1985; 1991–present
- Labels: Propaganda Records; Havoc Records; and more
- Members: Lazze; Seve; Vege; Perttu
- Website: www.riistetyt.com

Riistetyt are a Finnish hardcore punk band from Tampere. After Rattus and Kaaos, Riistetyt were one of the first groups in Finland to play hardcore punk. Originally formed as Cadgers, the band was created in 1981 and recorded one split 7-inch with Kaaos before changing their name. They played until 1985, then reunited in 1991 and have been active ever since.

The band have toured across Europe, Brazil, and the United States. In Finnish, their name means "the exploited", "the deprived", or "the oppressed". Riistetyt have been dubbed pioneers of hardcore in Tampere and their first full-length album Valtion vankina has been referred to as an "undisputed classic".

== Band members ==
The band's line-up has seen a number of changes over the years, however lead singer Lazze and bassist Piise are two founding members who remained with the band during most of its activity. Lazze has been its sole main vocalist since 1981, whereas Piise played bass guitar for Riistetyt from 1981 till 1983 and returned to this role in 2008.

=== Current members ===
- Lazze (Lateri, Lazer) – vocals
- Arttu – bass guitar
- Vege – guitar, backing vocals
- Seve – drums

=== Former members ===
- Perry – guitar (1982-1983)
- Stydy – drums (1981-1983)
- Raipe – guitar, bass guitar (1981-1983)
- Nappi – bass guitar (1983-1984, 1999–2008)
- Jaska – drums (1983-1985)
- Rike – guitar (1983-1985)
- Make – guitar, drums (1984-1985)
- Miki – bass guitar (1984-1985)
- Timo – drums (1999-2000)
- Raimo – guitar (2000)
- Jallo – drums (2007)
- Jukkeli – drums (2007-2010)

== Discography ==
=== As Cadgers ===
- Kytät On Natsisikoja / Kaaosta Tää Maa Kaipaa - split with Kaaos (1981)

=== As Riistetyt ===
- Laki ja järjestys (1982)
- Valtion vankina (1983)
- Skitsofrenia (1983)
- As Prisoner of State (1983)
- Raiskattu tulevaisuus (1984)
- Tuomiopäivä (1991)
- Tervetuloa kuolelma (2000)
- Kuka Valehtelee? (2001)
- Orjat ja Kurjat (2003)
- Kahleet (2005)
- Kuolonhymnejä (2009)
- Korppien Paraati (2013)
