= Appendix (band) =

Finnish punk rock band

- Origin: Pori, Finland
- Genres: Punk rock, hardcore punk
- Years active: 1980–1985, 1995–present
- Labels: Propaganda Records 1983– Rock-O-Rama 1983–1984; UHO Production 2006
- Members: Mikki Borgersen (Vocals 1982–present ), Miksa Huhdanpää (Bass 1984–present ) Ahti Impola (Guitar 1980–1982, 2010–present); Sami Valverinne (Drums 1999–present)
- Past members: Vesku Koivusalo (1980–1999); Ahti Impola (1980–1982); Tomi Hyppänen (1982–1984); Tom Lepistö (1982–1984); Olli Lindholm (1982–1982); Juha Rauäng (1982–1982); Jaska Karumo (1982–2010)
- Website: www.appendix.fi

Appendix is a Finnish punk rock band. It was founded in 1980 and has released five studio albums.

Their debut album was released in 1983. It was later re-issued by the German label Rock-O-Rama with an English title Money Is Not My Currency.

Olli Lindholm, the lead singer of one of Finland's highest selling rock groups Yö, is a former member of Appendix. In the spring 2015 Appendix had a West Coast Tour in United States and they performed at Manic Relapse festivals as the lead performer in Oakland, California.

== Discography ==
=== Singles and EPs ===
- EP (1982)
- Huora (1983, Propaganda Records)
- Suomineito (1996, Propaganda Records)
- Pop-idols (2006, UHO Production)
- TV (2012, Propaganda Records)

=== Studio albums ===
- Ei raha oo mun valuuttaa (1982, Propaganda Records)
- Money Is Not My Currency (1983, re-issue, Rock-O-Rama)
- Top of the Pops (1984, Rock-O-Rama/Propaganda Records)
- Syyntakeeton (2006, UHO Production)
- Studio-Live (2011, Propaganda Records)
- Extraneus (2013, Propaganda Records)

=== Compilation albums ===
- Diagnosis (Years 1982–83) (1994, Propaganda Records)
- PAROCK (2002, Propaganda Records)
