= Terveet Kädet =

Finnish hardcore punk band

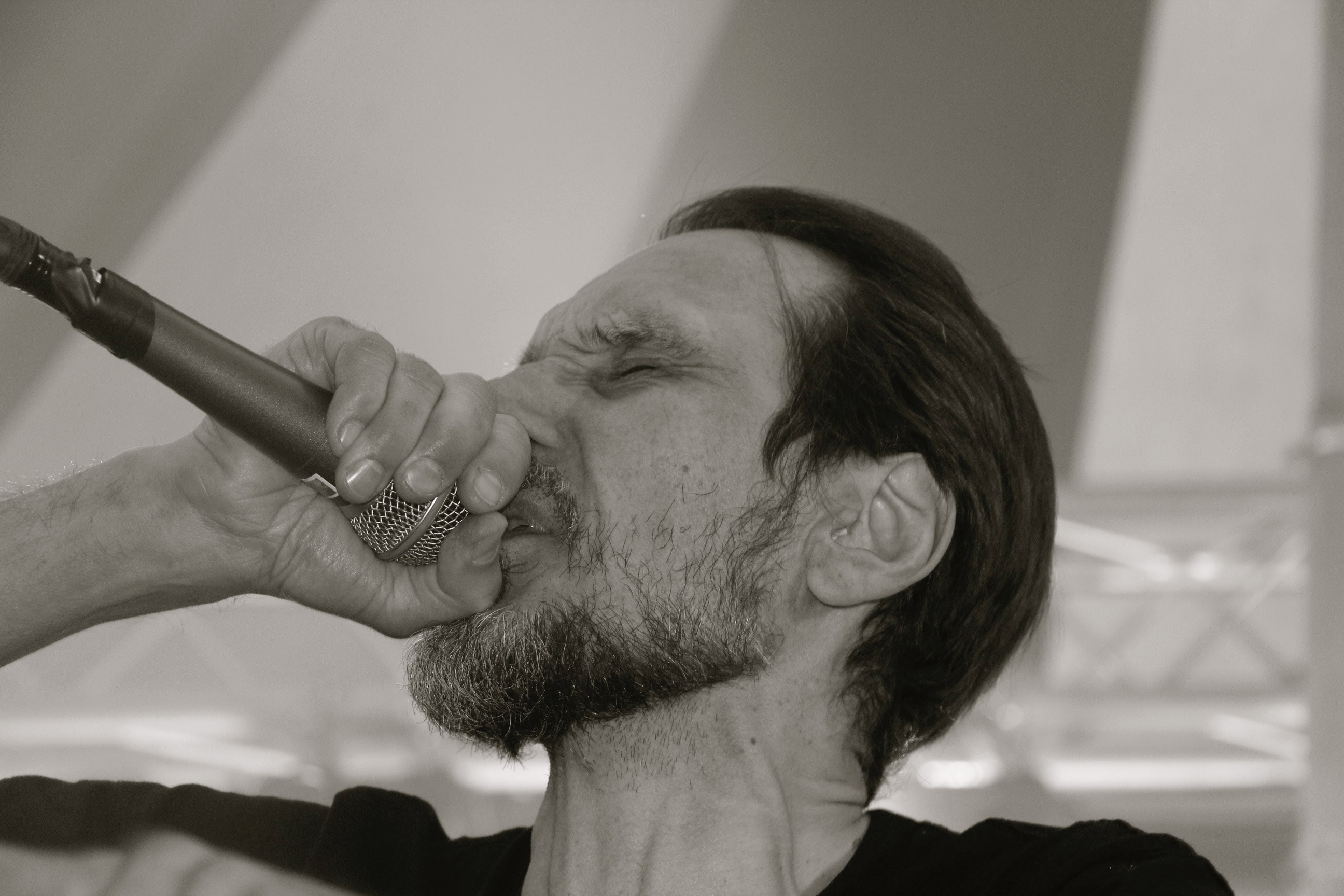
Lead singer Läjä Äijälä

Terveet Kädet are a Finnish hardcore punk band. The group was founded in Tornio in January 1980. They have had a major influence on bands from all over the world, especially in Brazil (which some have claimed was because of a member from the leading band Olho Seco and his enthusiasm and connections to that country's scene). Max Cavalera of Sepultura and Soulfly has mentioned Terveet Kädet as one of his all-time favourite bands.

The band's line-up changed several times, and the singer Veli-Matti "Läjä" Äijälä was the only permanent member. The band announced on its Facebook page in March 2016 that it was disbanded. Svart Records released complete works of the band from 1980's as an omnibus release "TK Pop 1980-1989" in 2019. Läjä Äijälä's current band Lapin Helvetti played a short tour to promote the release in summer and autumn 2019 playing only songs from the release.

The name Terveet Kädet means "Healthy Hands".

== Members ==
=== Last Line-Up ===
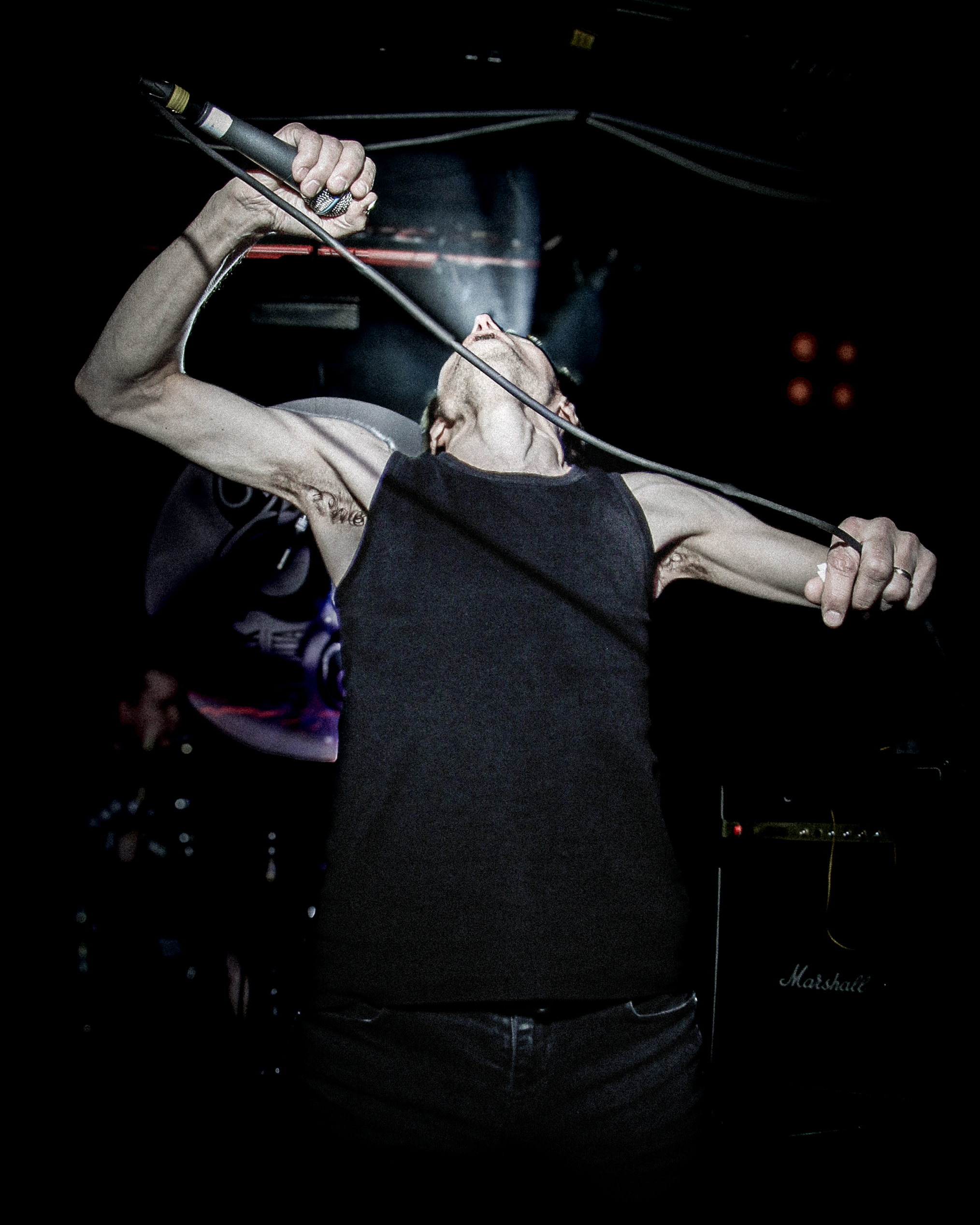
Läjä Äijälä of Terveet Kädet at the Jyrock festival in Jyväskylä on April 16th 2010

*Veli-Matti "Läjä" Äijälä – vocals, lyrics (1980–2016)

- Ilari – guitar (2006–2016) (2017-
- Lene – bass (2017–)
- Samppa – drums (2017-)

=== Past members ===
Drums

- Walde (1983–1984, died in 1984)
- Tilli (1984–2000)
- Luttinen (2000–2006)
- Peedro – drums (1980–1983, 2006–2011)
- Aki – drums (2011–2016)

Bass

- Piäsky (1980–1989)
- Kähkönen (1989–1990)
- Lene (1990–1998, 2006-2011)
- Puksu (1998–2006)

Jani 2011–2016)

Guitar

- Tiimo Viik (1980–1985)
- Weega (1985–1986)
- A. W. Yrjänä (1986–1988)
- Lene (2000–2006)
- Maike (1989–2006)

== Discography ==
=== Singles and EPs ===
- Rock laahausta vastaan (Ikbal 003, 1980)
- II (Ikbal 004, 1981)
- Ääretön joulu (Poko/Kädet 105, 1982)
- Kädet Suojelee (1983)
- Oma koloni (1988)
- Anno Domini (1989)
- Live Kemi 1982 (1989)
- Unkind (1990)
- Message (Kill City/Propaganda, 1990)
- Six Song (HCR, 1991)
- Slow Promotion (Mad Rat, 1991)
- Bizarre Domination (1992)
- The Horse (A.A.R., 1994)
- Pahan voima (A.A.R., 1995)
- Bondage And Anguished Life (Healthy Hands Records, 1995)

=== Studio albums ===
- Terveet Kädet (LP, Propaganda Records, 1983)
- Black God (LP, Propaganda/R-O-R licence Germany), 1984)
- The Horse (LP, 1985; Power It Up, 2006)
- Sign of the cross (CD, A.A.R., 1995)
- Doomed Alien Race (CD, A.A.R., 1997)
- The Ultimate Pain (CD, Solardisk, 1999)
- Non Ultra Descriptica (CD, Solardisk, 2000)
- Ihmisen poika, pedon poika (CD, Longplay Music/Kämäset levyt, 2009) (mini-album)
- Musta hetki (CD & LP, Longplay Music, 2012)
- Lapin helvetti (CD & LP, Svart Records / SPHC, 2015)
- Lapin helvetti (CD & LP, Svart Records / SPHC, 2015)
- Kaikki kaikkia vastaan (CD & LP, Svart Records /, 2023)

=== Live albums ===
- Knock-out (tape, BCT, 1984)
- Leather Enslavement (LP, Klayster Records, 1998)
- Pissaa ja paskaa (CD, Propaganda Records PRO 2026, 2006)
- UGH!!! Terveet Kädet elävänä (CD & LP, Longplay Music 2012)

=== Compilation albums ===
- Yalta Hi-Life (LP, 1984, with Varaus, Äpärät, Aivoproteesi, Kaaos, Kansanturvamusiikkikomissio)
- PROPAGANDA (LP, Kill City/Propaganda, 1991)
- Hardcore Brutality (CD, Grand Theft Audio, 1996)
- Kumia Ja Verta - 1987 Kokoelma (CD, Alternative Action, 1996)
- Ääretön Propaganda (CD, Propaganda Records PRO 2001, 1999)
- Onnellisia Kytkentöjä 1980-2000 (CD, Solardisk, 2002)
- Deep Wounds (CD, Usina De Sangue Records, 2002)
- Ääretön Propaganda (LP & bonus-EP, Propaganda Records/Höhnie Records, 2007)
- TK Pop 1980-1989 (5LP/2CD, Svart Records, 2019)
