= Kolmikärki =

Studio album by CMX
- Released: January 1990
- Recorded: October, 1989
- Genre: Hardcore punk
- Length: 39:06
- Label: Bad Vugum

CMX chronology
Kolmikärki (1990)	Veljeskunta (1991)

Professional ratings
Review scores
Source	Rating
Allmusic	1.5/5 stars

Kolmikärki (Trident) is CMX's 1990 debut album. Despite CMX's roots in punk, the musical style of the album varies greatly. The record meshes hardcore, heavy metal, acid rock, some jazz, ballads and waltz. A. W. Yrjänä's lyrics on the album contain a lot of religious imagery for which the band is still known. The lyrics have been influenced by a variety of religions, including Buddhism and Christianity, as well as drawing influence from shamanism. CMX's music has changed significantly since this early album, but their enthusiasm for experimenting with different musical styles has lived on.

The CD version of Kolmikärki released by Bad Vugum also contains the Raivo EP originally released in 1989. The "Gold" version of the album, released in 2002 contains both Raivo and CMX's first EP, Johannes Kastaja, originally released in 1987.

== Track listing ==
Music and lyrics by A. W. Yrjänä, arranged by CMX.

1. "Johdatus salatieteisiin" – 4:05 ("Introduction to the Occult")
2. "Sika ja perkele" – 2:25 ("Pig and the Devil")
3. "Nahkaparturi" – 1:51 ("Skinbarber")
4. "Kaikki nämä kädet" – 2:30 ("All These Hands")
5. "Götterdämmerung" – 2:05
6. "Kuolemattomuuden ääni" – 2:02 ("The Voice of Immortality")
7. "Pyydä mahdotonta" – 2:57 ("Ask for the Impossible")
8. "Pyörivät sähkökoneet" – 3:26 ("Rotating Electrical Machines")
9. "Taivas ja helvetti" – 2:19 ("Heaven and Hell")
10. "Voittamaton" – 2:05 ("Unbeatable")
11. "Suuri äiti" – 3:48 ("The Great Mother")
12. "Kolmas Johannes" – 1:51 ("The Third John")
13. "Hiljaisuuden pelko" – 1:35 ("Fear of Silence")
14. "Liekkisusi, sulkakäärme" – 6:07 ("Flamewolf, Feathersnake")

== Credits ==
- Pekka Kanniainen - Drums
- A. W. Yrjänä - Bass, Vocals
- Kimmo Suomalainen - Guitars

=== Visitors ===
- Tepa Lukkarinen - Lead guitar ("Pyörivät sähkökoneet")

== See also ==
- CMX discography
