= Aion (CMX album) =

Studio album by CMX
- Released: November 11, 2003
- Recorded: August 17 – October 17, 2003 at Inkfish Studios
- Genre: Progressive rock
- Length: 49:41
- Label: Herodes/EMI
- Producer: Rake, Janne Halmkrona and A.W. Yrjänä

CMX chronology
Isohaara (2002)	Aion (2003)	Pedot (2005)

Professional ratings
Review scores
Source	Rating
Desibeli.net	4.5/5 stars
Nyt	5/5 stars
Rockmusica.net	4/5 stars
Soundi	4/5 stars
Sue Magazine	4/5 stars

Aion (2003) is an album by the Finnish rock group CMX. The word Aion (or Aeon) is Ancient Greek for "age, life-force" and also a Finnish verb form meaning "I intend (to do something)".

The album is regarded as something of a concept album by the band and listeners alike; a common theme throughout the songs is the concept of the devil and how this concept manifests itself in the mortal world.

The album was placed at #50 in Finnish rock magazine Soundi's list of "50 most remarkable Finnish rock albums of all time".

== Track listing ==
All songs written by CMX with lyrics by A. W. Yrjänä.

1. "Pirunnyrkki" – 3:19 ("Devil's Fist")
2. "Sielunvihollinen" – 4:00 ("Satan", lit. "Enemy of the Soul")
3. "Melankolia" – 4:12 ("Melancholy")
4. "Fysiikka ei kestä" – 4:53 ("Physics Will Not Last")
5. "Palvelemaan konetta" – 3:52 ("To Serve a Machine")
6. "Kuoleman risteyksestä kolme virstaa pohjoiseen" – 5:42 ("Three Versts North from the Crossing of Death")
7. "Kyyn pimeä puoli" – 3:17 ("Dark Side of the Viper")
8. "Sivu paholaisen päiväkirjasta" – 4:12 ("Page from the Devil's Diary")
9. "Nahkasiipi" – 4:20 ("Leather Wing")
10. "Ensimmäinen saattaja" – 5:42 ("First Escort")
11. "Hautalinnut" – 6:12 ("Grave Birds")

== Personnel ==
- A. W. Yrjänä – vocals, bass guitar, acoustic guitar, producer
- Janne Halmkrona – guitar, bass guitar, trumpet, Rhodes piano, glockenspiel, backing vocals, producer
- Timo Rasio – guitars, bass guitar, backing vocals
- Tuomas Peippo – drums, percussion
- Rake – producer, engineer, mixing, programming, keyboards
- Anna-Leena Haikola, Janne Ahvenainen, Kati Kiraly, Marja-Sisko Lahti, Riikka Lampinen, Maija Juuti, Lotta Poijärvi, Siiri Rasta – strings
- Pauli Saastamoinen – mastering
- Ari Talusén – photography
- Olga Poppius – photography
- Sami Fiander – sleeve design
- Gabi Hakanen – executive producer
