= CMX (band) =

Finnish rock band

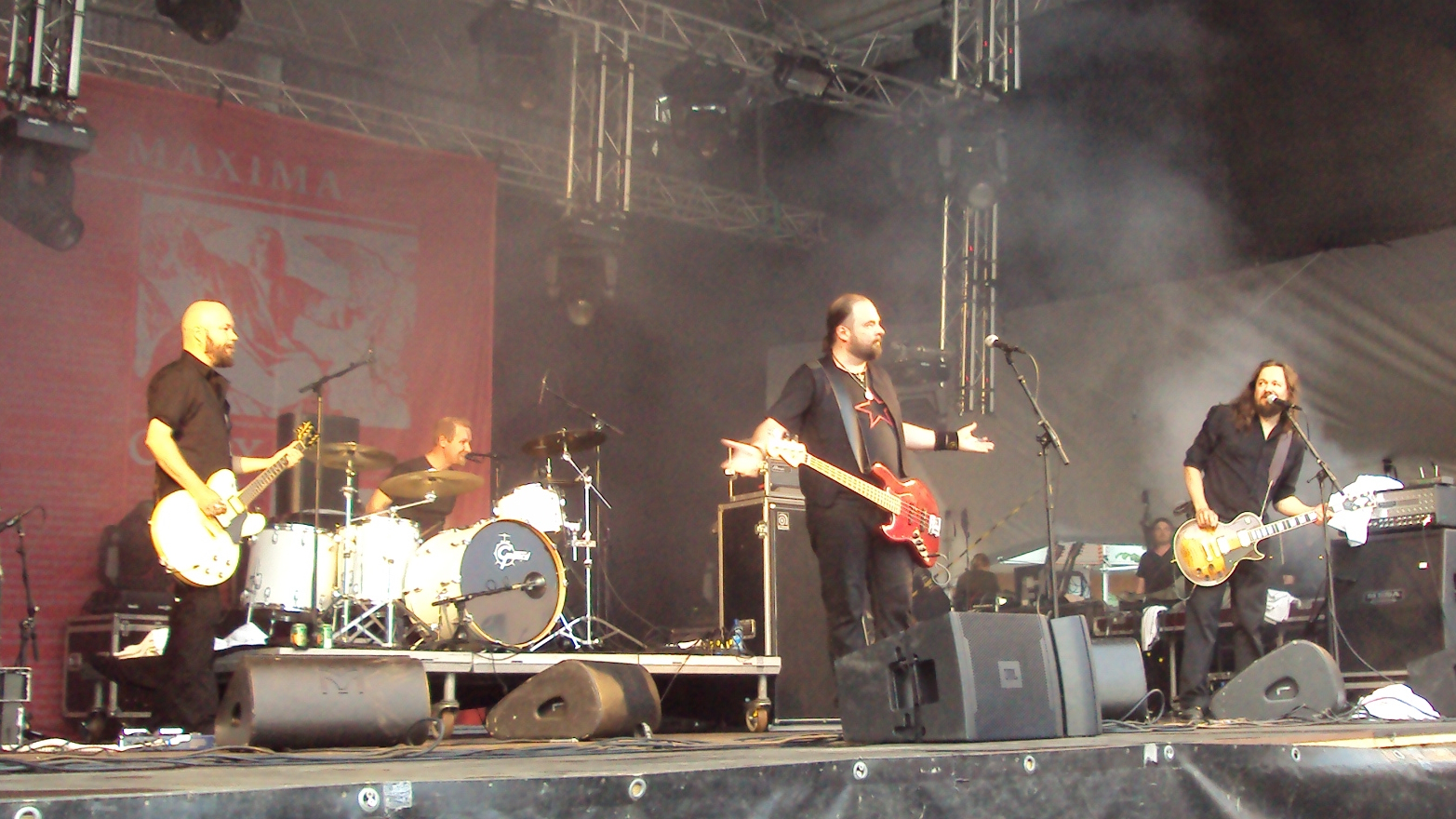
- CMX performing at Suomi Pop festival, Jyväskylä, Finland, July 23, 2011. (L-R) Timo Rasio, Tuomas Peippo, A. W. Yrjänä, Janne Halmkrona.

Background information
- Origin: Finland
- Genres: Hardcore punk Indie rock Progressive rock
- Years active: 1985–present
- Labels: EMI, Bad Vugum, P. Tuotanto, Ratas Music
- Members: A. W. Yrjänä; Janne Halmkrona; Timo Rasio; Olli-Matti Wahlström
- Past members: Kimmo Suomalainen; Pekka Kanniainen; Pasi Isometsä; Tuomas Peippo
- Website: www.cmx.fi

CMX, originally Cloaca Maxima, is a Finnish rock band. They originally played hardcore punk, but soon expanded to play a wide variety of rock formats, including progressive rock, heavy metal, and mainstream rock 'n' roll. Throughout their career, they have been influenced by progressive rock bands such as Rush, Yes, Tool and King Crimson. The progressive influence is most evident on their albums Dinosaurus Stereophonicus (2000) and Talvikuningas (2007).

CMX have gradually gained large-scale mainstream following in Finland. They are especially known for the poetic lyrics of A. W. Yrjänä that often contain references to mythology and religion. Finnish rock magazines, particularly Rumba, have named them Best Band of the Year multiple times, and even Best Band of All Time on one occasion.

== History ==
=== Early years 1985–1990 ===
CMX was founded on Good Friday 1985 in Tornio, Finland by A. W. Yrjänä (18 at the time) and Pekka Kanniainen. The band's original name, Cloaca Maxima, Latin for the "Greatest Sewer", was taken from a footnote of H. P. Blavatsky's book Isis Unveiled. Over the next six months Kanniainen became the drummer, Yrjänä the bassist and singer, and Kimmo Suomalainen the guitarist. The band played mainly fast hardcore punk with the vocals sung in English; the language, however, soon changed into Finnish. The band shortened its name to CMX in 1986.

The first EP Johannes Kastaja was recorded 1987 in Kemi and released in 1988. The same year CMX performed for the first time outside of Tornio and its neighbouring areas, at Lieto punk rock festival. In 1989 the EP Raivo was released on a small label Bad Vugum. The band's first appearance at the Tavastia Club in Helsinki followed.

The first full-length album Kolmikärki was released in January 1990. The album received practically no radio airplay and sold less than 2,000 copies during the first year. During the spring Pasi Isometsä was brought on as a second guitarist, however he would only stay in the band for less than a year. As the band moved south to Helsinki in late 1990, guitarists Isometsä and Suomalainen weren't willing to leave Tornio and eventually quit the band. They were replaced by Janne Halmkrona and, in early 1991, Timo Rasio. This lineup would remain the same for the following six years. In early 1991 they recorded another EP, Tanssitauti, and later that year the band's second full-length album, Veljeskunta. The aggressive hardcore approach of the album was generally well received by the press.

=== Mainstream success ===
1992's Aurinko, released by the international EMI record label, won CMX both the Album of the Year and Band of the Year awards in a poll by Finnish Rumba music magazine. The album saw CMX largely abandon the hardcore style in favor of more accessible mainstream rock songs.

In 1994, Aura was released. The album continued the trend towards mainstream audiences, which was criticized by the band's early hardcore fan base. Aura contained some of the band's best known songs to date, including the etheric ballad "Ruoste" and the radio-friendly (though lyrically hardly traditional) love song "Kultanaamio".

The trend continued with Rautakantele, released in 1995 and produced by Yrjänä. Essi Wuorela appeared as a guest artist. "Pelasta maailma", the only single from the album, received some radio airplay and would later be covered by both Antti Tuisku and Vesa-Matti Loiri.

=== Changes ===
For their next album, the band changed radically their approach to recording. Discopolis (1996) was engineered with Pro Tools in the studio and made heavy use of sampling to edit the songs together from a set of short guitar riffs. The album received mixed reviews: Allmusic wrote that "friends of the modern music will find Discopolis very attractive", while Tero Valkonen, on his analysis of "Kultanaamio", expressed his dislike for the album, and called the song "Paha" a "rotten bad joke". Discopolis was the first CMX album to enter the Finnish album charts, peaking at No 3. In 1997, drummer Kanniainen left CMX saying that the band had become too professional for him. Tuomas Peippo was hired to replace him. The same year CMX released a three-CD compilation album, Cloaca Maxima.

=== 1998–2003 ===
The first album with new drummer Tuomas Peippo, Vainajala (1998), was recorded in a cabin in Lapland and produced by Faith No More bassist Billy Gould. According to the band the deliberately minimalistic sound of the album was largely thanks to Gould. Vainajala was the first CMX album to top the Finnish album charts. At the Provinssirock festival 1999, CMX announced that they intended to stop playing live in order to concentrate on their studio work.

Dinosaurus Stereophonicus (2000) was CMX's nod toward 1970s progressive rock bands, such as King Crimson, Pink Floyd and Yes. A two-hour double album, it contains progressive elements not before associated with CMX: Three instrumental pieces, an emphasis on keyboards, long solos, and song lengths exceeding 10 minutes. CMX's first number 1 single, the peaceful and melodic "Myrskyn ratsut" was released before the album and featured strings and steel guitar.

By the time Isohaara (2002) was released, CMX had already abandoned the idea of becoming a full-time studio band and started touring again. The album was considered slightly heavier than its predecessor, and the guitar riffs of "Minne paha haudattiin" were compared to the music of Timo Rautiainen & Trio Niskalaukaus and Kotiteollisuus. The album's lyrics concentrated less on mythology and religion and were closer to traditional rock lyrics, albeit keeping a dark, melancholy tone. Although less present than on Dinosaurus Stereophonicus (2000), progressive influences hadn't been totally abandoned: The band uses a child choir on the title track and the uptempo rocker "Pohjoista leveyttä" contains a harmonica solo.

Bad Vugum re-released the first two CMX albums in 2002 as "Gold" versions that also included their early EPs. Kolmikärki Gold included EPs Johannes Kastaja (1987) and Raivo (1989), and Veljeskunta Gold contained EPs Tanssitauti (1990) and Musiikin ystävälliset kasvot (1998).

A year after Isohaara, Aion (2003) followed. The album was put together around a common theme of the essence and symbolism of evil. It was both a critical and commercial success and was described as a highly experimental album for such an established band. Guitarist Halmkrona plays trumpet on the first track of the album, and violins and synthesizers are heard on several songs. Both "Melankolia" and, four months later, "Palvelemaan konetta" peaked the singles chart.

=== 2004–present ===
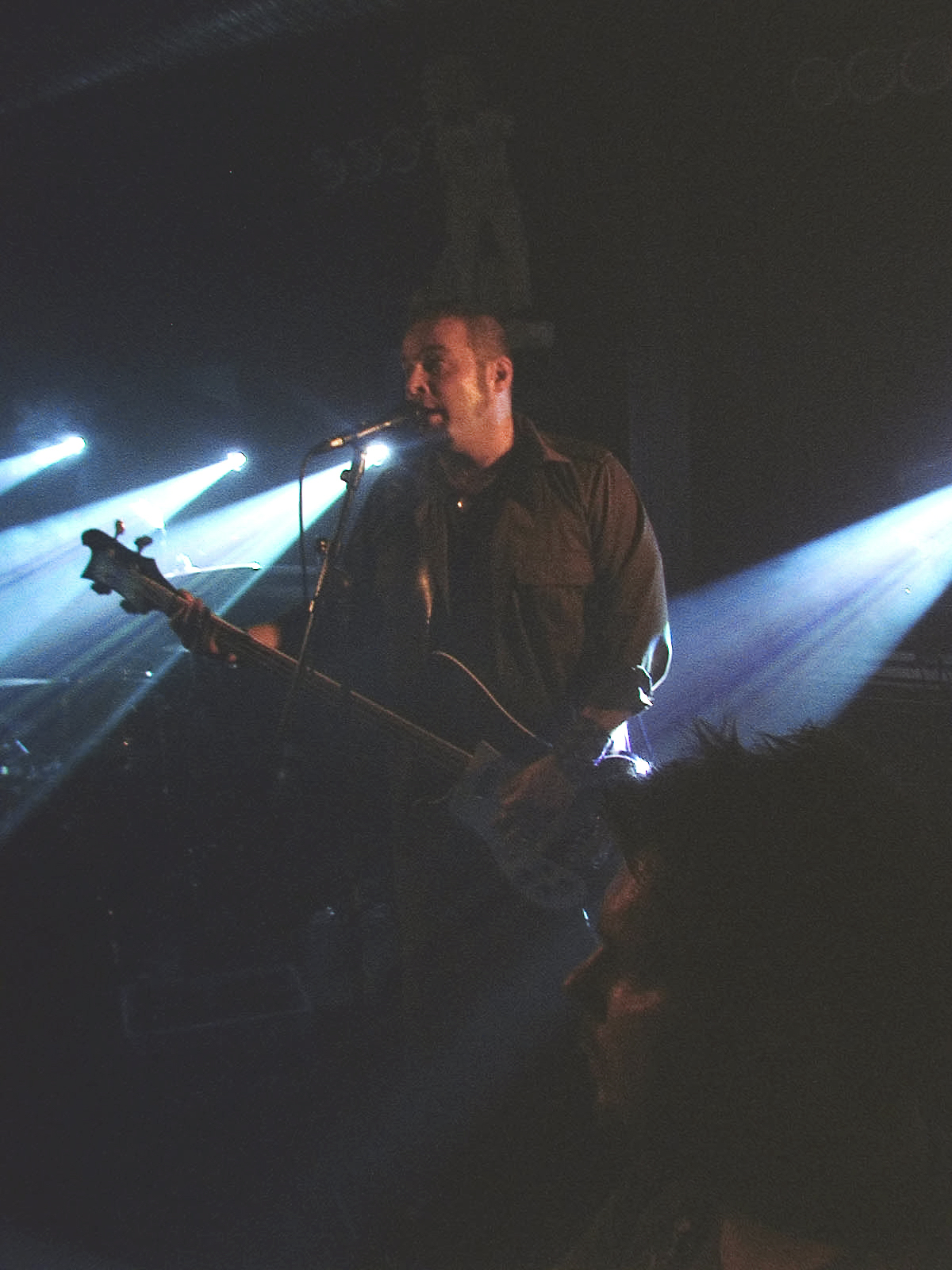
A. W. Yrjänä in 2006

The band's second three-CD compilation Cloaca Maxima II, released in 2004, followed the format of the 1997 Cloaca Maxima closely. Both consisted of 44 songs on three CDs, the first one concentrating on faster rock songs, the second on ballads and the third on B-sides. The compilation covered four albums from Vainajala (1998) to Aion (2003) and also featured three previously unreleased songs. The band had originally intended the compilation to only include the B-sides, and indeed the third disc was the one that received some praise from the press.

Pedot (2005) showed some influences from contemporary rock bands such as Tool, A Perfect Circle and System of a Down, and combined straight rock songs with heavier and lighter elements, such as the minimalistic ballad "Eteläisen tähtitaivaan kartoitus" and the aggressive double bass drum sound of the title track. "Uusi ihmiskunta" was a number one hit, the sixth one for CMX in just over five years.

On the Tuuliajolla 2006 tour on lake Saimaa, CMX recorded a song in collaboration with fellow rock bands Kotiteollisuus and 51Koodia. Ambiguosly named "Vapaus johtaa kansaa" ("Liberty Leading the People") was written by Yrjänä and released in 2006. It reached number one on the Finnish singles chart.

CMX's following album, Talvikuningas (2007), was a space-themed rock opera and contains only one song, divided onto 12 tracks without pauses. Originally, the story about the power and fall of the Winter King (Talvikuningas in Finnish) was going to be the story of a novel by Yrjänä. The first edition of the album was soon sold out despite being much more expensive than a regular album. The press reviews were largely positive. Helsingin Sanomat newspaper called the album CMX's "third bullseye" after Aura and Aion, while Soundi music magazine argued that the album will probably be a mere curiosity in the CMX saga.

CMX's thirteenth studio album, Iäti, was released by EMI on 29 September 2010. The singles released before the album were called "Sateenkaaren pää" and "Linnunrata".

Drummer Tuomas Peippo left the band in 2012 due to his job as a dentist. The fourteenth studio album, Seitsentahokas, was released in February 2013. The drummer for the album was Olli-Matti Wahlström, known for bands Kumikameli and 51koodia, who later in the spring became the official member of the band. The first single released from the album was "Kusimyrsky" in November 2012, followed by "Rikkisuudeltu" in February 2013.

Fifteenth studio album Mesmeria was released in 2015. It was produced by Arto Tuunela and first without producer Rauli Eskolin since Isohaara released in 2002.

== Popularity ==
CMX are practically unknown outside Finland. However, Billy Gould of Faith No More produced their 1998 album Vainajala. In Finland, CMX has won the Rumba magazine "Band of the Year" reader poll ten times. In 2005, the band was even voted the "Best Band of All Time" by the magazine's readers, in favour of such bands as The Beatles, Metallica, Led Zeppelin and Iron Maiden. In a City magazine poll, they were voted the best Finnish band of all time. In a Helsingin Sanomat newspaper reader poll in 2007, the readers voted both "Ruoste" and "Kultanaamio" into the top 10 of Finnish rock songs. CMX were the only band to have two songs in the top 10.

Ten CMX albums, including their both compilations, have been certified gold, each having sold approximately 20,000 copies. CMX DVD has also reached the gold record threshold for DVDs, which is 5,000 copies. The platinum record threshold for albums in Finland, which none of the band's albums have achieved, is 30,000 copies sold.

== Musical style ==
Early CMX was influenced by heavy metal, punk rock and progressive rock. During their career, they have explored several different genres of rock music. Their early EPs and albums up until Veljeskunta (1991) have been mainly hardcore, although combining a variety of styles. From Aurinko (1992) onwards, hardcore has been merely an ephemeral element in their varied expression. Progressive rock elements are always present in the band's music, most evidently on Dinosaurus Stereophonicus (2000) and Talvikuningas (2008). Many of the band's best known songs are ballads, such as "Ruoste" and "Pelasta maailma".

=== Lyrics ===
All the band's lyrics are written by vocalist Yrjänä. His texts are often poetic, symbolic and intertextual, and contain themes of mythology, religion and philosophy. Many CMX fans are attracted to the band particularly for Yrjänä's texts, although there are also people who can't stand the band because of them.

== Band members ==
During the early years of the band, the lineup changed several times. A. W. Yrjänä is the only remaining original member.

=== Current lineup ===
- A. W. Yrjänä – vocals, bass (1985–)
- Janne Halmkrona – guitar (1990–)
- Timo Rasio – guitar (1991–)
- Olli-Matti Wahlström – drums (2012–)

=== Past members ===
- Kimmo Suomalainen – guitar (1985–1990)
- Pasi Isometsä – guitar (1990)
- Pekka Kanniainen – drums (1985–1997)
- Tuomas Peippo – drums (1997–2012)

== Discography ==
- Kolmikärki (1990)
- Veljeskunta (1991)
- Aurinko (1992)
- Aura (1994)
- Rautakantele (1995)
- Discopolis (1996)
- Vainajala (1998)
- Dinosaurus Stereophonicus (2000)
- Isohaara (2002)
- Aion (2003)
- Pedot (2005)
- Talvikuningas (2007)
- Iäti (2010)
- Seitsentahokas (2013)
- Mesmeria (2015)
- Alkuteos (2018)

== See also ==
- List of best-selling music artists in Finland
