= Janne Halmkrona =

Finnish musician (born 1968)

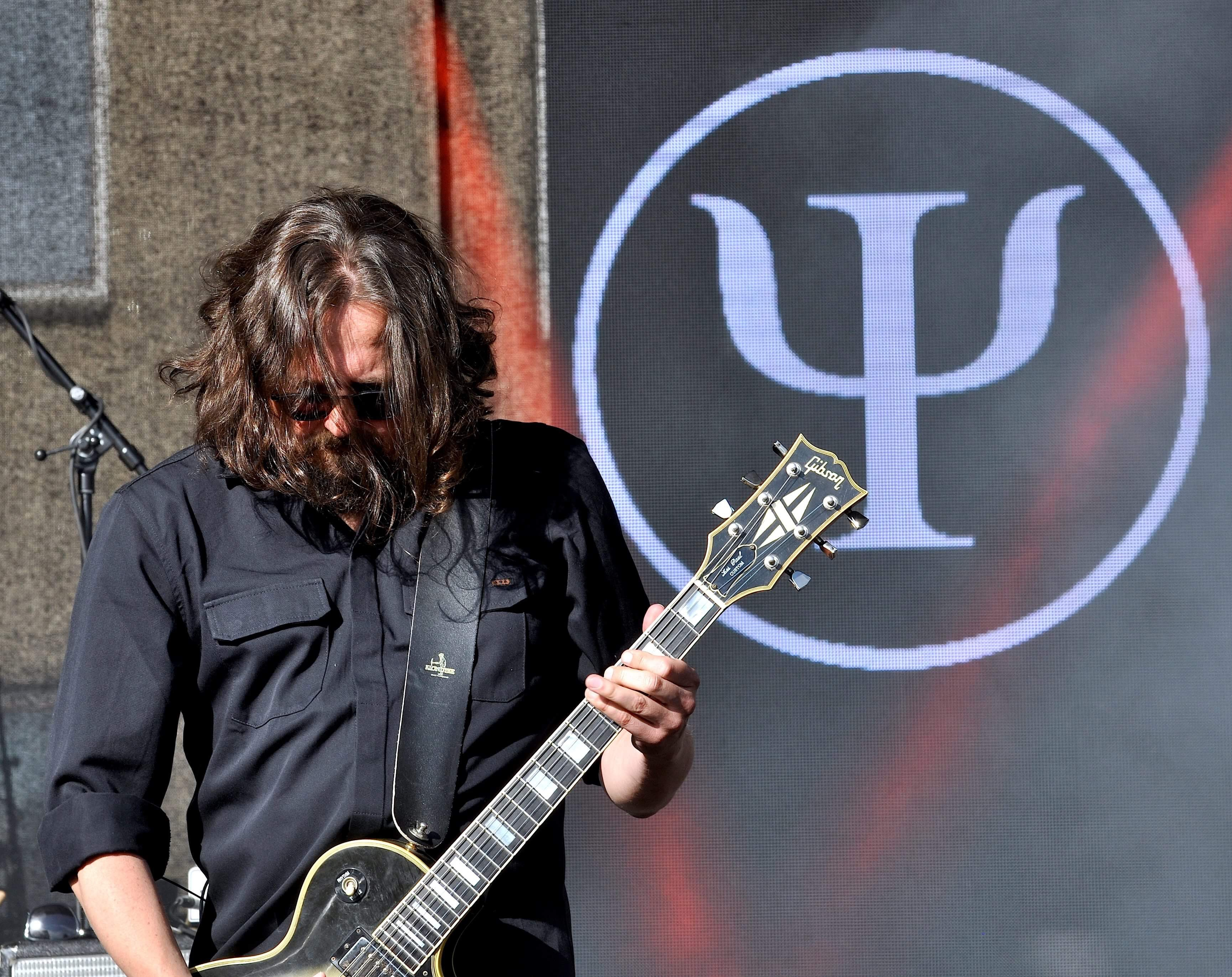
- Born: 29 April 1968 (age 58); Finland
- Occupation: Musician
- Known for: Best known for playing in CMX

Janne Halmkrona (born 29 April 1968) is a Finnish musician. He is best known for playing in CMX, a band he joined in 1990, replacing Kimmo Suomalainen. He has also released two albums with Sapattivuosi, a Black Sabbath tribute band. Halmkrona also worked as an A&R manager for Sony BMG Finland.

Halmkrona holds a master's degree in musicology. His playing has been influenced by bands such as the Sex Pistols, Judas Priest, Yes and Genesis. In addition to his guitar playing, he has also done radio work for Radio Helsinki, hosting a weekly show "Sabotaasi" and "Heviurpot", where he and Lasse Kurki played 1980s hard rock classics.

Halmkrona has co-produced two CMX albums, Veljeskunta (1991) and Aion (2003), as well as Sodankylä (2004) by Maj Karma. He has also worked as executive producer for pop singer/pianist Elviira.

== Discography ==
=== With CMX ===
See CMX discography.

=== With Sapattivuosi ===
- Sapattivuosi (2003)
- Vol. 2 (2005)
- Ihmisen merkki (2009)

=== With Aki Tykki & Kanuunaorkesteri ===
- Totuuden tiellä (2020)
