= A. W. Yrjänä =

Finnish poet and musician

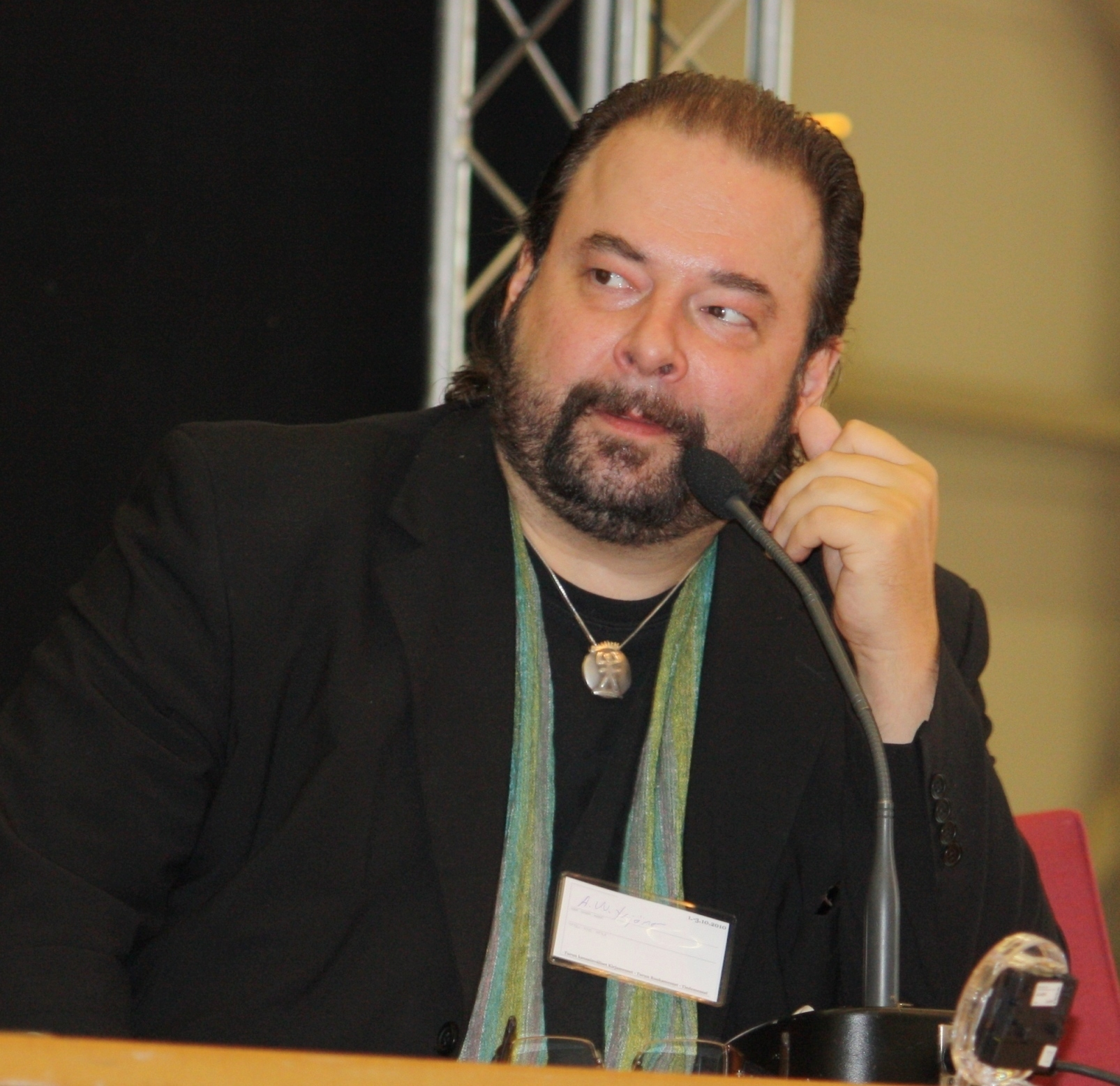
A. W. Yrjänä in 2010.

Aki Ville Yrjänä (born 30 July 1967 in Kemi), better known by the stage name, A. W. Yrjänä (Finnish pronunciation: [ˈɑːʋeː ˈyrjænæ]), is a poet and the singer, bassist, and primary songwriter of the Finnish rock band CMX. In addition to his musical work, he has published five collections of poems.

== Music ==
Yrjänä has studied theology and comparative religion, and his texts often contain strong mythological imagery. His symbolic texts are considered to be a major part of CMX's appeal. Yrjänä himself has said: "I've never tried to write cryptic text, but it seems I just think in a complicated manner."

Yrjänä also plays the guitar, and usually composes on the guitar rather than his primary instrument, the bass guitar. He can be heard playing the guitar on the occasional CMX song (such as "Hautalinnut" from Aion), as well as on "Pop-musiikkia" by Neljä baritonia. He has produced Rautakantele and co-produced a number of other CMX albums as well as albums by other artists, such as Pohjannaula, Wilma and Little Mary Mixup.

In 1997, Yrjänä wrote Silta Niilin yli that consisted of 18 songs for a seven-piece orchestra. It was performed on the Joensuun Laulujuhlat festival. He has also collaborated with Sanna Kurki-Suonio and Henrik Otto Donner in composing a musical piece for the celebration of the 150th birthday of the Finnish national epic Kalevala. It was performed in the Helsinki Ice Hall in February 1999.

== Poems ==
=== Arcana ===
In 1997, Yrjänä released his first poem book, Arcana. Tommy Tabermann, one of Finland's most popular contemporary poets, commented that the book "surprised him" and referred to Yrjänä as a "very promising fellow". In response to criticism that the book contained too much obscure references for the average reader, Yrjänä published an appendix to Arcana on the CMX web site. He wrote that he "did not explain the poems - a poem can't be explained - only clarified the background of some expressions."

=== Rota ===
Rota was published in 2000 and divided the opinions of critics: some criticized his language as not being mature enough for serious poetry, and argued that he makes "very simple mistakes, the kind they warn you about on writing courses." Others praised Yrjänä for his mythological visions and the massive intertextuality of the poems. Arcana and Rota were later published as a CD audiobook Arcana & Rota, performed by Yrjänä himself.

=== Somnia ===
Yrjänä's third book, Somnia, was a similar success. Jukka Koskelainen of Helsingin Sanomat appreciated Yrjänä's exotic imagery and knowledge of different philosophies and religions, although he felt that the writer's language lacks the finer nuances of some of his more experienced colleagues. Yrjänä has said in an interview that when Somnia was finished, he thought it was great, but half a year later he started thinking that half of the poems could have been left out. Published in 2003, it was Yrjänä's first book for Johnny Kniga publishing company. The first two collections were published by Like.

=== Mechanema ===
In Mechanema (2006), the themes of alchemy, metaphysics and ancient mythology were largely put to the background and accompanied by a melancholy everyday tone. Helsingin Sanomat regarded it as Yrjänä's best work so far. The poet himself has stated that there will be another four (or possibly five) books to the same series, and that the starting letters of the books will form a word. According to him, Mechanema started its life as a single epic poem, but the idea was later abandoned because he considered the book would become too hard for both the writer and the reader.

== Discography ==
=== With CMX ===
See CMX discography.

=== With Terveet Kädet ===
- Pahan voima -87 (EP, 1987)
- Oma koloni (EP, 1988)
- Anno Domini (EP, 1989)

=== With Neljä baritonia ===
- "Pop-musiikkia" (single, 1997)
