= Dschinghis Khan discography =

- Studio albums: 8
- Compilation albums: 15
- Singles: 35

This is the discography of German Eurodisco group Dschinghis Khan, also known as Genghis Khan.

== Albums ==
=== Studio albums ===
| Title | Album details | Peak chart positions | | | Sales |
| Title | Album details | FIN | GER | JPN | Sales |
|---|---|---|---|---|---|
| Dschinghis Khan | Released: August 1979; Label: Jupiter; Formats: LP, MC; Released in Australia as Genghis Khan with English-language versions of some tracks | 28 | 8 | 53 | JPN: 14,950 |
| Rom | Released: September 1980; Label: Jupiter; Formats: LP, MC | — | 5 | — | |
| Viva | Released: 1980; Label: Jupiter; Formats: LP, MC; Re-release of Rom without bonus tracks | — | — | — | |
| Wir sitzen alle im selben Boot | Released: October 1981; Label: Jupiter; Formats: LP, MC | — | 52 | — | |
| Helden, Schurken & der Dudelmoser | Released: 1982; Label: Jupiter; Formats: LP, MC | — | — | — | |
| Corrida | Released: 1983; Label: Jupiter; Formats: LP, MC | — | — | — | |
| 7 Leben | Released: 11 May 2007; Label: Koch Universal; Formats: CD, digital download | — | — | — | |
| Here We Go (Note: Wolfgang Heichel and Stefan Track lineup.) | Released: 11 December 2020; Label: United Music Group; Formats: CD, digital download | — | — | — | |
"—" denotes releases that did not chart or were not released in that territory.

=== Compilation albums ===
| Title | Album details | Peak chart positions | Sales |
| Title | Album details | JPN | Sales |
|---|---|---|---|
| Greatest Hits | Released: 14 October 1980; Label: Jupiter; Formats: LP, MC; Japan and South Korea-only release | — | |
| Golden Prize | Released: 21 June 1980; Label: Victor; Formats: MC; Split album with Arabesque; Japan-only release | 31 | JPN: 44,820 |
| Die grossen Erfolge | Released: 1981; Label: Jupiter; Formats: LP, MC | — | |
| Starportrait | Released: 1985; Label: Jupiter; Formats: LP, MC | | |
| Golden Best | Released: 10 April 1988; Label: Jupiter; Formats: LP, MC; South Korea-only release | — | |
| Best of Best | Released: 25 June 1994; Label: Victor; Formats: CD; Japan-only release | — | |
| Huh Hah Dschinghis Khan – Ihre grössten Erfolge | Released: 26 April 1993; Label: Jupiter/BMG; Formats: CD, MC | — | |
| The History of Dschinghis Khan | Released: 1999; Label: Jupiter/BMG; Formats: CD, MC | — | |
| Non-Stop Best Hits | Released: 21 February 2001; Label: Victor; Formats: CD; Japan-only release | — | |
| Star Collection | Released: 31 January 2002; Label: BMG; Formats: 2xCD | — | |
| The Jubilee Album | Released: 27 September 2004; Label: Jupiter; Formats: CD, digital download | — | |
| Best Of | Released: 16 December 2005; Label: Victor; Formats: CD; Japan-only release | — | |
| The Best | Released: 16 September 2009; Label: Victor; Formats: CD; Japan-only release | — | |
| Die grossen Hits | Released: 2012; Label: Weltbild Music; Formats: CD | — | |
| Moskau – Das Neue Best Of Album | Released: 13 April 2018; Label: Sony Music/Jupiter; Formats: CD | — | |
"—" denotes releases that did not chart or were not released in that territory.

== Singles ==
| Title | Year | Peak chart positions | | | | | | | | | | Certifications and sales | Album |
| Title | Year | GER | AUS | AUT | BEL | DEN | JPN | NL | NZ | SA | SWI | Certifications and sales | Album |
|---|---|---|---|---|---|---|---|---|---|---|---|---|---|
| "Dschinghis Khan" | 1979 | 1 | — | 8 | 20 | 1 | — | — | — | — | 3 | GER: Gold | Dschinghis Khan |
| "Genghis Khan" (English-language version) | 1979 | 18 | 86 | — | — | — | 12 | — | 33 | — | — | JPN: 164,000 | Genghis Khan |
| "Moskau" | 1979 | 3 | — | 16 | — | 7 | 35 | 38 | — | — | 11 | JPN: 13,000 | Dschinghis Khan |
| "Rocking Son of Dschinghis Khan" (English-language version) (Note: The German-language version of "Rocking Son of Dschinghis Khan" was released as the B-side to "Moskau". However, in some countries, for the English-language release of the single, the sides were flipped, with "Rocking Son of Dschinghis Khan" as the A-side and "Moscow" as the B-side.) | 1979 | — | — | — | — | — | — | — | — | — | — | | Genghis Khan |
| "Moscow" (English-language version) | 1979 | — | 1 | — | — | — | — | — | — | — | — | AUS: Platinum | Genghis Khan |
| "Hadschi Halef Omar" | 1979 | 7 | — | — | — | — | 63 | — | — | — | — | JPN: 18,000 | Rom |
| "Samurai" (Japan-only release) | 1980 | — | — | — | — | — | 73 | — | — | — | — | JPN: 41,000 | Dschinghis Khan |
| "Rom" | 1980 | 12 | — | 19 | — | — | — | — | — | — | — | | Rom |
| "Rome" (English-language version) | 1980 | — | — | — | — | — | — | — | — | 14 | — | | Genghis Khan |
| "Machu Picchu" (Japan-only release) | 1980 | — | — | — | — | — | 84 | — | — | — | — | JPN: 8,000 | Rom |
| "Pistolero" | 1981 | 15 | — | — | — | 10 | — | — | — | — | — | | Wir sitzen alle im selben Boot |
| "Pistolero" (English-language version) | 1981 | — | — | — | — | — | — | — | — | — | — | | Non-album single |
| "Loreley" | 1981 | 6 | — | — | — | — | — | — | — | — | 11 | | Wir sitzen alle im selben Boot |
| "Loreley" (English-language version) | 1981 | — | — | — | — | — | — | — | — | — | — | | Non-album single |
| "Wir sitzen alle im selben Boot" | 1981 | 44 | — | — | — | — | — | — | — | — | — | | Wir sitzen alle im selben Boot |
| "What Shall We Do with the Drunken Sailor" | 1981 | — | — | — | — | — | — | — | — | — | — | | Wir sitzen alle im selben Boot |
| "Klabautermann" | 1982 | 37 | — | — | — | — | — | — | — | — | — | | Helden, Schurken & der Dudelmoser |
| "Kaboutertjes" (Dutch-language version; Netherlands and Belgium-only release) | 1982 | — | — | — | 13 | — | — | 23 | — | — | — | | Non-album single |
| "Der Dudelmoser (Auf der Alm, da gibt's koa Sünd)" | 1982 | 46 | — | — | — | — | — | — | — | — | — | | Helden, Schurken & der Dudelmoser |
| "Himalaja" | 1983 | — | — | — | — | — | — | — | — | — | — | | Non-album single |
| "Olé, Olé" | 1983 | — | — | — | — | — | — | — | — | — | — | | Corrida |
| "Corrida" | 1984 | — | — | — | — | — | — | — | — | — | — | | Corrida |
| "Mexico" | 1985 | — | — | — | — | — | — | — | — | — | — | | Non-album singles |
| "Give Me a Sign" | 1986 | — | — | — | — | — | — | — | — | — | — | | Non-album singles |
| "Wir gehör'n zusammen" (as Dschinghis Khan Family) | 1986 | — | — | — | — | — | — | — | — | — | — | | Non-album singles |
| "Can't Stop Now" (as D.K. Family) | 1986 | — | — | — | — | — | — | — | — | — | — | | Non-album singles |
| "Huh Hah Dschinghis Khan" (Super Power Medley Mix) | 1993 | — | — | — | — | — | — | — | — | — | — | | Huh Hah Dschinghis Khan – Ihre grössten Erfolge |
| "The Story of Dschinghis Khan" (Remix '99) | 1999 | — | — | — | — | — | — | — | — | — | — | | The History of Dschinghis Khan |
| "Moskau '99" | 1999 | — | — | — | — | — | — | — | — | — | — | | The History of Dschinghis Khan |
| "The Story of Dschinghis Khan Part II" | 1999 | — | — | — | — | — | — | — | — | — | — | | The History of Dschinghis Khan |
| "Dschinghis Khan Tartar Mix" (with Berryz Kobo; Japan-only release) | 2008 | — | — | — | — | — | 35 | — | — | — | — | | Non-album singles |
| "We Love Football" (Note: Wolfgang Heichel lineup.) | 2018 | — | — | — | — | — | — | — | — | — | — | | Non-album singles |
| "Moskau Moskau" (featuring Jay Khan) | 2018 | — | — | — | — | — | — | — | — | — | — | | Non-album singles |
| "Die Strassen von Paris" | 2019 | — | — | — | — | — | — | — | — | — | — | | Here We Go |
| "Istanbul" | 2020 | — | — | — | — | — | — | — | — | — | — | | Here We Go |
| "Helena" | 2023 | — | — | — | — | — | — | — | — | — | — | | Non-album single |
"—" denotes releases that did not chart or were not released in that territory.
