= Last Alliance =

Last Alliance may refer to:

- The Last Alliance (band), an American power metal band inspired by J. R. R. Tolkien and George R R Martin
- Last Alliance (band), a Japanese rock band
- The Last Alliance (album), an album by the power metal band Battlelore
