= Battlelore =

Finnish heavy metal band

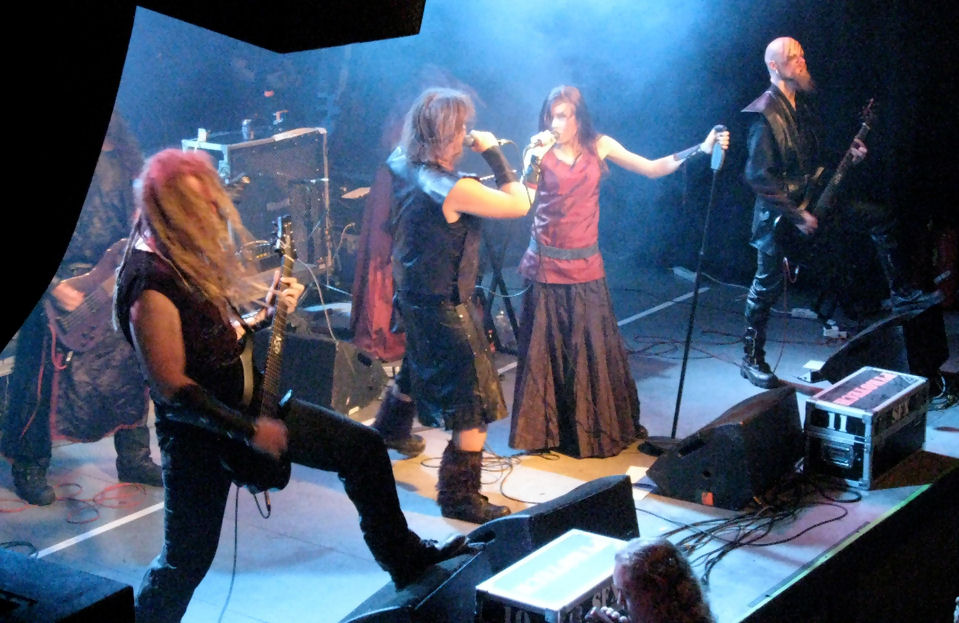
- Battlelore at Tuska Open Air 2008

Background information
- Origin: Lappeenranta, Finland
- Genres: Symphonic metal, folk metal, gothic metal, power metal, melodic death metal
- Years active: 1999–2011, 2016, 2022–present
- Label: Napalm Records
- Members: Kaisa Jouhki; Tomi Mykkänen; Jussi Rautio; Jyri Vahvanen; Timo Honkanen; Maria Honkanen; Henri Vahvanen
- Past members: Miika Kokkola; Patrik Mennander; Tommi Havo; Gorthaur
- Website: battlelore.net

Battlelore are a Finnish heavy metal band from Lappeenranta, founded in 1999 by guitarist Jyri Vahvanen and bassist Miika Kokkola. The name is a portmanteau of the words 'battle' and 'folklore'. Many of Battlelore's lyrics concern J. R. R. Tolkien's Middle-earth sagas. Their stage costumes and live shows are inspired by the themes and characters of fantasy literature. The band had many changes of personnel during their twelve years of activity, and went on a long hiatus after the tour supporting their latest release, Doombound, in 2011. In January 2016, they announced that they would perform at Metal Female Voices Fest XIII in October 2016.

== History ==
=== The first demo and Napalm Records (1999–2004) ===
Battlelore's first demo, Warrior's Tale, was released in late 1999, the same year the group was founded. Battlelore attracted the attention of Austrian record label Napalm Records after the release of the second demo, Dark Fantasy, in late 2000, which debuted long-standing members Kaisa Jouhki as female singer, Henri Vahvanen on drums, and Maria Honkanen on keyboards. The label asked the band to record an untitled 3-track demo before signing the contract.

In the fall of 2001, the band was at Music Bros. Studios to record their debut album with producer Miitri Aaltonen.

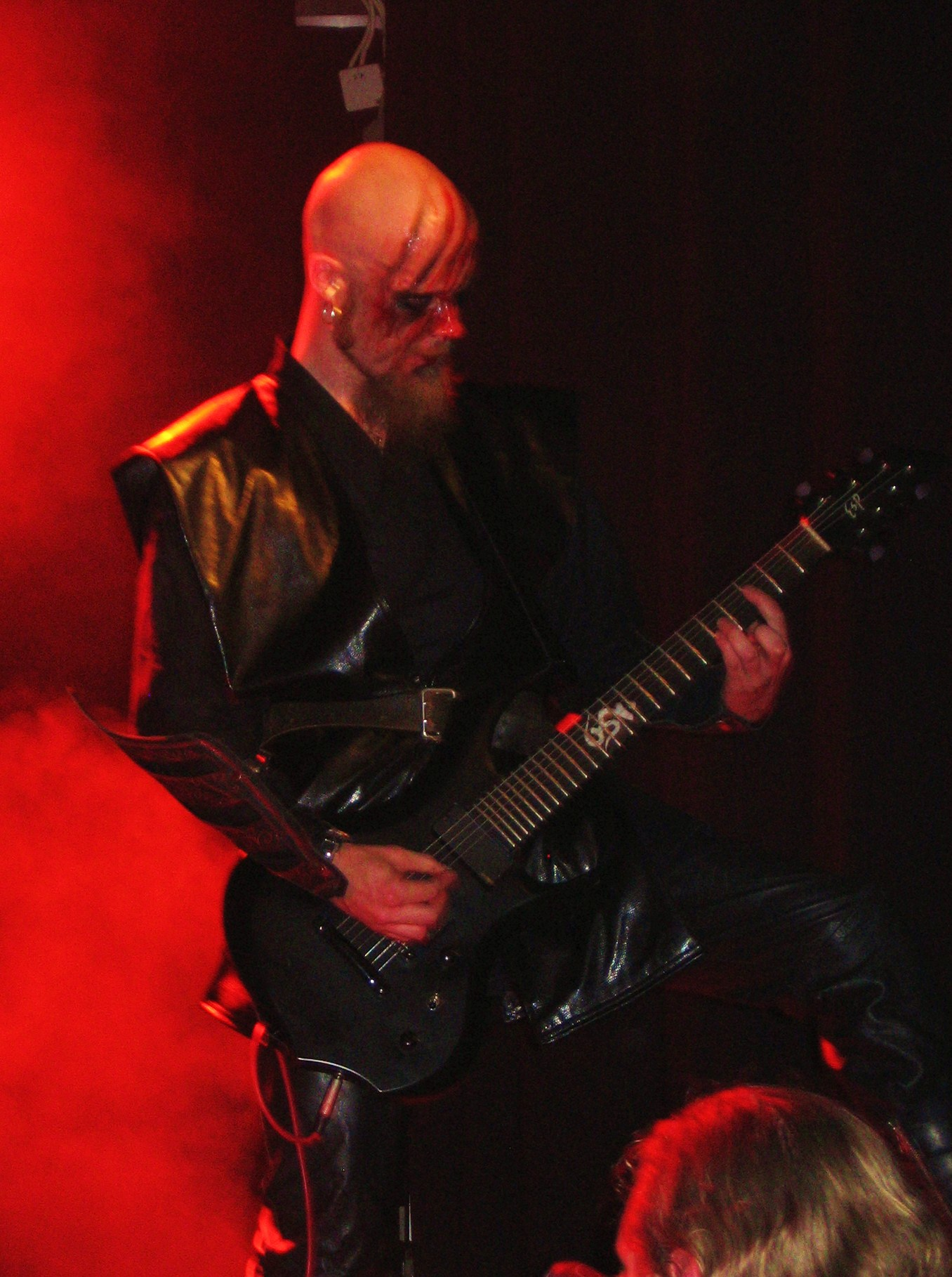
Guitarist Jyri Vahvanen at Tuska Open Air Metal Festival, Helsinki in June 2008

Around this time, guitarist Tommi Havo left the band for personal reasons and was replaced with current lead guitarist Jussi Rautio. The debut album, ...Where the Shadows Lie, which includes re-recorded songs from early demos, was released in 2002. A video for the song "Journey to Undying Lands" was shot to promote the album. Battlelore are best known for their second album, Sword's Song, recorded at Music Bros. Studios with producer Miitri Aaltonen and released in the spring of 2003, defined by many as their best. The album was successful and led the group to their first European tour.

In 2004, the band released their first DVD, The Journey, containing a concert held at the Finnish Tavastia Club in Helsinki, a documentary, and video clips.

=== Change of formation and Third Age of the Sun (2004–2005) ===
In 2004, singer Patrik Mennander left the band, because of lack of time to devote to Battlelore, and his place was taken at first temporarily and then officially by former Evemaster frontman Tomi Mykkänen. Mennander's last concert was a show as headliner band at the RingCon (the official festival of The Lord of the Rings in Bonn, Germany). Bassist and founding member Miika Kokkola left the band for personal reasons and was replaced with Timo Honkanen, a former tour roadie.

This line-up released their third studio album, Third Age of the Sun, in 2005, recorded at Sound Suite Studios in the spring of 2005 and produced by Terje Refsnes. The video for "Storm of the Blades" was filmed to promote the album. Music critics considered Third Age of the Sun inferior to previous records, partly due to the departure of Mennander and Kokkola. The album presents a more varied and ambitious songwriting, mixing folk tunes and a symphonic vein, rendered through the more prominent use of keyboards and the temporary waiver of clean male vocals, which, however, reappeared in the next album.

The album entered the Finnish charts at number 38.

=== Touring in Europe, more albums, and hiatus (2006–2011) ===
After attending the Wacken Open Air festival of 2006, Battlelore started recording their fourth album in the fall, with Miitri Aaltonen at Music Bros Studios. It was released in early 2007 with the title Evernight, preceded by the video for the song "House of Heroes". Many defined Evernight the darkest album of the Finnish group, and their best since Sword's Song.

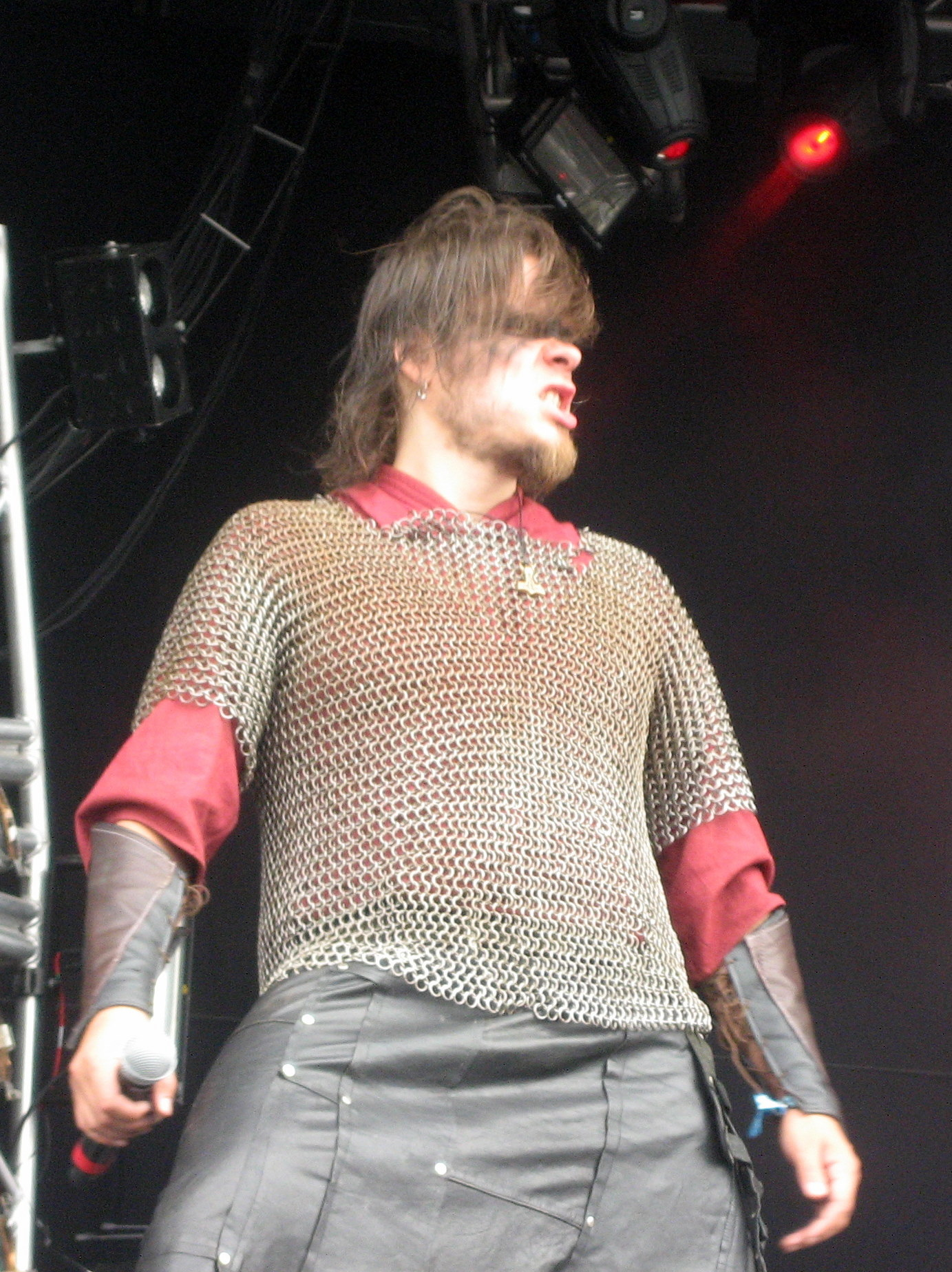
Tomi Mykkänen at Bloodstock Open Air Festival 2009 in England

In early September, a European tour planned for November with Draconian and Darzamat was announced, but the tour was later canceled.

In January 2007, guitarist Vahvanen left the band to travel through Asia for six months, and was replaced with Tommy Lintunen, who appears in the video for "House of Heroes". On his return in June, Vahvanen took back his place as guitarist.

In September, it was announced that the Finnish band would open the November dates of After Forever in Helsinki and Tampere, but the dates were deleted by the promoter and in November Battlelore were also excluded from the European tour with Korpiklaani, scheduled for December. On 20 October 2007 the band was at the Metal Female Voices Fest and the performance was recorded to be part of a live DVD.

In the period from April to May 2008, their fifth album The Last Alliance was recorded at Sound Supreme Studios in Hämeenlinna with Dan Swanö as producer. The album was published in September, preceded by the video for the song "Third Immortal". After a week from release, the album reached position twenty-sixth in the best-selling albums chart in Finland. Battlelore were part of 'The Finnish Fire Tour' along Korpiklaani, Falchion and Kivimetsän Druidi, but singer Mykkänen had to be replaced by Harri Hyytiäinen, a member of Avathar for personal problems. The album was also released in a special edition with a DVD, including the recording of the Metal Female Voices Fest 2007 concert

During the summer, the place of drummer was taken temporarily by Enrico Annus, because of Henri Vahvanen's other personal commitments.

In July 2009, it was announced that the group had renewed the contract with Napalm Records, ended with The Last Alliance, providing label support for the band's next album and its promotional tour.

In late September 2009, the band embarked on a brief tour of six dates in England together with Finntroll and in December it was announced that the sixth album was in preparation and Battlelore would have entered the studio around June–July 2010 for the recordings. The publication was intended for October 2010 and then moved to early 2011.

Doombound was recorded again at Sound Supreme Studios with Janne Saksa, with Dan Swanö at mixing duties. The album returned to the sound of the first records, and it was Battlelore's first concept album, focusing on the figure of Túrin Turambar. The album contains eleven songs, including one instrumental and one sung in Finnish language to celebrate Finland and the Finnish epic poem, the Kalevala. The special edition of the album contains the DVD 10 Years of Battlelore, with many special features.

On 23 October 2011, the group announced via their website an indefinite break from the music scene, indicating that this is not a final farewell.

=== Reunion show and The Return of the Shadow (2016, 2022-present) ===
In January 2016, they announced that they would be performing a reunion concert at Metal Female Voices Fest XIII in October 2016.

On 3 June 2022, they released their seventh studio album titled The Return of the Shadow, the band's first album in over a decade.

== Style and influences ==
Battlelore mixes female vocals with harsh male growling in "beauty and the beast" duets, backed by heavy guitar riffing and occasional keyboard interludes. The band's style takes elements from gothic metal, folk metal, power metal and melodic death metal. Because of the variety of Battlelore's music, different reviewers have labeled the band with each of these genres, as well as idiosyncratic terms such as "epic metal" or "fantasy metal". Guitarist and founder Jyri Vahvanen described the music of Battlelore as "fantasy metal" and "very bombastic, epic and melodic metal".

According to Battlelore's official MySpace website, Bolt Thrower, Emperor, The Gathering, Kyuss, Black Sabbath, Morbid Angel, Katatonia, Anathema, My Dying Bride, Iron Maiden, W.A.S.P., Zakk Wylde, Dissection and Theatre of Tragedy are some of the artists who influenced the music of the band.

Battlelore's lyrics are about Middle-earth characters and events described by the British author J. R. R. Tolkien in The Lord of the Rings trilogy of books and in The Silmarillion. Further inspiration comes from medieval literature and the Kalevala. Starting with the album Evernight, the band decided against using names or places from Tolkien, although his works remain the main inspiration for their lyrics.

The same inspiration marks the band's distinctive pseudo-medieval stage show, in which each member is dressed up in costumes and fantasy makeup to look like "ferocious warriors", "dirty thieves" or "beautiful female elves".

== Band members ==
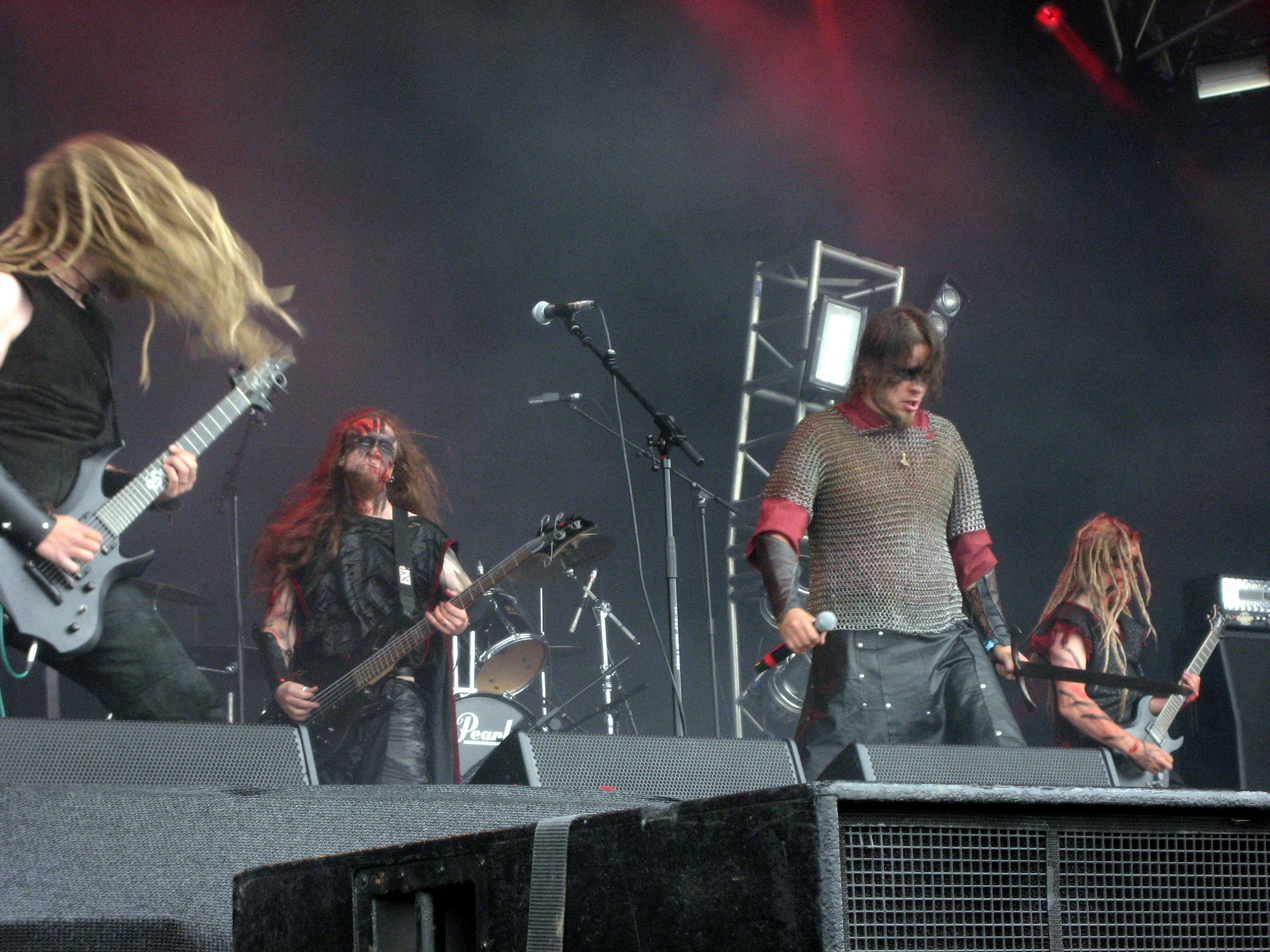
Battlelore at Bloodstock Festival 2009

=== Current ===
- Jyri Vahvanen – rhythm guitar (1999-present)
- Kaisa Jouhki – female vocals (2000-present)
- Henri Vahvanen – drums (2000-present)
- Maria Honkanen – keyboards, flute (2000-present)
- Jussi Rautio – lead guitar (2002-present)
- Tomi Mykkänen – male vocals (2004-present)
- Timo Honkanen – bass (2004-present)

=== Former ===
- Miika Kokkola – bass (1999–2004)
- Patrik Mennander – male vocals (1999–2004)
- Tommi Havo – vocals (1999–2000), lead guitar (2000–2002)
- Jarkko Heilimo (a.k.a. Gorthaur) – drums (1999–2000)
- Arto Mäkikuusela – keyboards (1999–2000)

=== Guests ===
- Erik Zacharias – synthesizer
- Jyrki Myllärien – classical guitar

Timeline

== Discography ==
=== Studio albums ===
Year	Title	The Official Finnish Charts
2002	...Where the Shadows Lie	—
2003	Sword's Song	—
2005	Third Age of the Sun	38
2007	Evernight	—
2008	The Last Alliance	26
2011	Doombound	—
2022	The Return of the Shadow	44

=== Promo albums ===
- Warrior's Tale (2000)
- Dark Fantasy (2001)

=== DVDs ===
- The Journey (2004)

=== Videos ===
- "Journey to Undying Lands" (2003) Director - Antti Hyyrynen (STAM1NA)
- "Storm of the Blades" (2005) Director - Markku Kirves
- "House of Heroes" (2007) Director - Markku Kirves
- "Third Immortal" (2008)
- "Firekeeper" (Lyric Video) (2022)
- "Chambers Of Fire" (2022)
- "Elvenking" (2022) Director - Markku Kirves
- "True Dragons" (Lyric Video) (2023)
