= Corrida =

Corrida may refer to:

- Bullfight
- Corrida (horse), a racehorse
- Corrida (Dschinghis Khan album), 1983
- Corrida (Kabát album), 2006
