= Rom (album) =

Studio album by Dschinghis Khan
- Released: 1980
- Recorded: 1979
- Studio: Olympia Studios Munich
- Genre: Disco
- Length: 67:11 (Rom); 50:19 (Viva)
- Language: German
- Label: Jupiter Records
- Producer: Ralph Siegel

Dschinghis Khan chronology
| Dschinghis Khan (1979) | Rom (1980) | Wir sitzen alle im selben Boot (1981) |

Singles from Rom
- 1. "Hadschi Halef Omar" Released: 1979; 2. "Rom" Released: 1980; 3. "Machu Picchu" Released: 1980

Alternative cover
- Viva album cover

Professional ratings
Review scores
| Source | Rating |
|---|---|
| Allmusic | 2/5 stars |

Rom (German for Rome) is the second album released by German disco group Dschinghis Khan. It features the singles "Hadschi Halef Omar", "Rom", and "Machu Picchu". The album was also released as Viva, minus four tracks ("Hadschi Halef Omar" and three tracks originally from their self-titled debut album). It was the last studio album with Steve Bender, who left the group in 1981.

== Track listing ==
=== Rom ===
All tracks are written by Bernd Meinunger and Ralph Siegel, except where noted.

Side A
| No. | Title | Writer(s) | Length |
|---|---|---|---|
| 1. | "Rom" | | 5:50 |
| 2. | "Madagaskar" | | 4:35 |
| 3. | "Kaspar Hauser" | Meinunger; Wolfgang Heichel | 4:44 |
| 4. | "Mann und Frau" ("Man and Woman") | | 4:13 |
| 5. | "Käpt'n Nemo" | Meinunger; Leslie Mándoki; Steve Bender | 5:25 |
| 6. | "Die Fremden" ("The Strangers") | | 5:05 |
| 7. | "Sierra Nevada" | | 4:44 |

Side B
| No. | Title | Writer(s) | Length |
|---|---|---|---|
| 1. | "Machu Picchu" | | 7:08 |
| 2. | "Kontiki" | Werner Schüler; Siegel | 3:51 |
| 3. | "Tiger, Tiger" | | 4:44 |
| 4. | "Moskau" | | 4:29 |
| 5. | "Hadschi Halef Omar" | | 3:47 |
| 6. | "Der Verräter" ("The Traitor") | | 5:34 |
| 7. | "Dschinghis Khan" | | 3:02 |

=== Viva ===
Side A
| No. | Title | Writer(s) | Length |
|---|---|---|---|
| 1. | "Rom" | | 5:50 |
| 2. | "Madagaskar" | | 4:35 |
| 3. | "Kaspar Hauser" | Meinunger; Heichel | 4:44 |
| 4. | "Mann und Frau" | | 4:13 |
| 5. | "Käpt'n Nemo" | Meinunger; Mándoki; Bender | 5:25 |

Side B
| No. | Title | Writer(s) | Length |
|---|---|---|---|
| 1. | "Machu Picchu" | | 7:08 |
| 2. | "Kontiki" | Schüler; Siegel | 3:51 |
| 3. | "Tiger, Tiger" | | 4:44 |
| 4. | "Die Fremden" | | 5:05 |
| 5. | "Sierra Nevada" | | 4:44 |

== Charts ==
=== Weekly charts ===
| Chart (1980) | Peak position |
|---|---|
| German Albums (Offizielle Top 100) | 5 |

=== Year-end charts ===
| Chart (1980) | Position |
|---|---|
| German Albums (Offizielle Top 100) | 38 |
