= Third Age of the Sun =

Studio album by Battlelore
- Released: 25 July 2005
- Recorded: March–April 2005
- Studio: Sound Suite Studio, Marseille, France
- Genre: Melodic death metal, folk metal, Celtic metal
- Length: 49:45
- Label: Napalm
- Producer: Terje Refsnes, Battlelore

Battlelore chronology
Sword's Song (2003)	Third Age of the Sun (2005)	Evernight (2007)

Professional ratings
Review scores
Source	Rating
Metal Review	(6.9/10)
Metal Storm	(6.5/10)
Lords of Metal	(60/100)
The Metal Crypt	3.5/5 stars

Third Age of the Sun is the third studio album released by the Finnish heavy metal band Battlelore, released in 2005. As on previous albums, the songs are all based on J. R. R. Tolkien's Middle-earth sagas. This album introduced new bass player Timo Honkanen and new vocalist Tomi Mykkänen, who had previously toured with the band when Miika Kokkola and Patrik Mennander had been unavailable. The sound of the album differs from the first two Battlelore albums, as the instrumentation has a more live and organic feel and also due to the absence of clean male vocals.

The album peaked at position 38 in The Official Finnish Charts.

== Track listing ==
All lyrics are written by Jyri Vahvanen, except "Usvainen Rhûn" by Kaisa Jouhki

No.	Title	Music	Length
1.	"Usvainen Rhûn"	Maria Honkanen	1:36
2.	"Storm of the Blades"	Jyri Vahvanen, Battlelore	3:22
3.	"Ghân of the Woods"	Jussi Rautio, Battlelore	4:41
4.	"Gwaith-i-Mírdain"	Battlelore	3:43
5.	"Trollshaws"	Vahvanen, Battlelore	4:07
6.	"Elves of Lúva"	Rautio, Jouhki	4:39
7.	"Valier - Queens of the Valar"	Vahvanen, Battlelore	4:19
8.	"Thousand Caves"	Rautio, Battlelore	4:06
9.	"Cloaked in Her Unlight"	Rautio, Battlelore	4:13
10.	"Of Orcs and Elves"	Vahvanen, Battlelore	4:26
11.	"Touch of Green and Gold"	Vahvanen, Battlelore	3:59
12.	"Pallando - Forgotten Wizards I"	Vahvanen, Rautio, Battlelore	3:31
13.	"Gollum's Cry"	Honkanen	3:03
14.	"Alatar - Forgotten Wizards II" (Digipak edition bonus track)	Battlelore	3:33
15.	"Elessar's Call" (Digipak edition bonus track)	Battlelore	4:11
16.	"Dwimmerlaik" (Digipak edition bonus track)	Battlelore	4:28
Total length:			61:57

== Credits ==
Band members

- Kaisa Jouhki - vocals
- Tomi Mykkänen - vocals
- Jussi Rautio - guitar, acoustic guitars
- Jyri Vahvanen - guitar
- Timo Honkanen - bass
- Henri Vahvanen - drums
- Maria Honkanen - keyboards

Production

- Terje Refsnes - producer, engineer, mixing
- Miitri Aaltonen - additional pre-production
- Tommi Havo - additional growl-vocals arrangements
- Mika Jussila - mastering at Finnvox Studios

== Lyrical references ==
- "Usvainen Rhûn" refers titular to the land of Rhûn.
- "Ghân of the Woods" is about Ghân-buri-Ghân and the Drúedain.
- "Gwaith-i-Mírdain" tells about the elven smiths who forged the Rings of Power.
- "Trollshaws" is about the encounter in the troll-woods, from The Hobbit.
- "Valier - Queens of the Valar" is about the Queens of the Valar.
- "Thousand Caves" is about the Thousand Caves of Menegroth in Doriath.
- "Cloaked in Her Unlight" tells about Ungoliant and the destruction of the Two Trees of Valinor.
- "Of Orcs and Elves" is about the breeding of Orcs from Elves.
- "Touch of Green and Gold" is about Tom Bombadil.
- "Pallando - Forgotten Wizards I" is about Pallando, one of the Blue Wizards.
- "Gollum's Cry" is about Gollum during The Two Towers.
- "Elessar's Call" is about the gifts Aragorn receives to aid the Fellowship.
- "Alatar - Forgotten Wizards II" is about Alatar, one of the Blue Wizards.
- "Dwimmerlaik" is a dialogue-like song between Éowyn and the Witch-king of Angmar.
