= Swordmaster =

A swordmaster is a person skilled in the art of swordsmanship

Swordmaster or Sword Master may also refer to:

== Characters ==
- Carla the Swordmaster, a character in the video game series The Secret of Monkey Island
- Sword Master (Marvel Comics), a Marvel Comics character
- Swordmaster (Soul series), a character class in the video game series Soulcalibur
- Sword Master, a character in the manga series Afro Samurai
- Swordmaster, a fighting style of Dante in the video game series Devil May Cry
- Sword Master, a Dungeon Fighter Online character subclass

== Other uses ==
- Sword Master (film), a 2016 Chinese film directed by Derek Yee
- Sword Master (video game), a 1990 video game
- The Swordmaster, the official publication of the U.S. Fencing Coaches Association
- "Swordmaster", a song by Battlelore from their 2002 debut album ...Where the Shadows Lie
- "Swordmaster", a song by 3 Inches of Blood from their 2004 album Advance and Vanquish

== See also ==
- The Swordmasters of Dune, the working title of the 2016 novel Navigators of Dune by Brian Herbert and Kevin J. Anderson
- Swordmasters of Ginaz, an organization in the Dune universe
- Master of the Sword, a United States Military Academy title
- Master Sword, a fictional sword in the video game series The Legend of Zelda
