= Darmstadt (disambiguation) =

Darmstadt is a city in the Bundesland (federal state) of Hesse in the Federal Republic of Germany.

Darmstadt may also refer to:

- Darmstadt (region), a German governmental region in Hesse
- Darmstadt-Dieburg, a district in Hesse, Germany
- Darmstadt, Indiana, a town in Vanderburgh County, Indiana, United States
- Darmstadt, Illinois, a town in St. Clair County, Illinois, United States
- SV Darmstadt 98, a football club in Darmstadt, Germany
- the Darmstadt meteorite, which fell in Hesse, Germany before 1804 (see meteorite falls)
- the Darmstädter Ferienkurse, or Darmstadt International Summer Courses for New Music
- the Darmstadt School, a style of musical composition prevalent in the 1950s
- "Darmstadt" (song), the single by the Finnish band Ruoska
- Darmstadt slide rule
- 241418 Darmstadt, an asteroid

== See also ==
- Landgraviate of Hesse-Darmstadt
- Grand Duchy of Hesse
- People's State of Hesse
- Prince George of Darmstadt (1669–1705)
