= Sword's Song =

- Cover art by Ted Nasmith

Studio album by Battlelore
- Released: July 22, 2003
- Recorded: January–March 2003
- Studios: Music Bros Studios, Imatra, Finland
- Genres: Gothic metal, symphonic metal, power metal
- Length: 42:57
- Label: Napalm
- Producers: Miitri Aaltonen, Battlelore, Eric Zacharias

Battlelore chronology
...Where the Shadows Lie (2002)	Sword's Song (2003)	Third Age of the Sun (2005)

Professional ratings
Review scores
Source	Rating
Metal Storm	(6.5/10)
The Metal Crypt	4.5/5 stars

Sword's Song is the second studio album released by the Finnish heavy metal band Battlelore, released in 2003. As with all of the band's other albums, the lyrics are based on J.R.R. Tolkien's Middle-earth sagas. Sword's Song's music and lyrics are essentially similar to those of their debut album, but in the opinion of most reviewers and fans showed an improvement in both strength of the material and quality of the performances.

The album was the last to feature original vocalist Patrik Mennander and bass player Miika Kokkola and, as a result, following releases saw a noticeable change in the sound of Battlelore.

== Track listing ==
All music by Battlelore, all lyrics by Jyri Vahvanen.

No.	Title	Length
1.	"Sons of Riddermark"	04:06
2.	"Sword's Song"	04:08
3.	"The Mark of the Bear"	04:27
4.	"Buccaneers Inn"	03:54
5.	"Attack of the Orcs"	03:13
6.	"Dragonslayer"	03:30
7.	"Khazad-Dûm Pt.2 (Silent Caverns)"	04:08
8.	"Horns of Gondor" (instrumental)	03:52
9.	"The War of Wrath"	03:57
10.	"Forked Height"	03:18
11.	"Starlight Kingdom"	04:24
Total length:		42:57

Digipack Edition bonus track
No.	Title	Length
12.	"The Curse of the Kings"	03:57
Total length:		46:54

== Credits ==
Band members

- Kaisa Jouhki - vocals
- Patrik Mennander - vocals
- Jussi Rautio - guitar
- Jyri Vahvanen - guitar
- Miika Kokkola - bass
- Henri Vahvanen - drums
- Maria Honkanen- keyboards

Production

- Miitri Aaltonen - producer, engineer, mixing
- Eric Zacharias - pre-production, additional synthesizer arrangements
- Pauli Saastamoinen - mastering at Finnvox Studios

== Lyrical references ==
- "Sons of Riddermark" deals with the history of the Éothéod.
- "The Mark of the Bear" is about the Beornings.
- "Buccaneers Inn" deals with the Black Númenóreans.
- "Attack of the Orcs" is about the Orken hordes in the Third Age.
- "Dragonslayer" is based on the story of Túrin Turambar.
- "Khazad-Dûm Pt. 2 (Silent Caverns)" deals with the invasion of Moria.
- "The War of Wrath" is based on the War of Wrath.
- "Forked Height" deals with the tower of Orthanc.
- "The Curse of the Kings" is about the Nazgûl.
- "Starlight Kingdom" is about the city of Gondolin.
