= Dschinghis Khan (album) =

Studio album by Dschinghis Khan
- Released: 1979
- Recorded: 1979
- Studio: Olympia Studios Munich
- Genre: Disco
- Length: 46:37
- Language: German
- Label: Jupiter Records
- Producer: Ralph Siegel

Dschinghis Khan chronology
Dschinghis Khan (1979)	Rom (1980)

Singles from Dschinghis Khan
- 1. "Dschinghis Khan" Released: 1979; 2. "Moskau" Released: 1979; 3. "Rocking Son of Dschinghis Khan" Released: 1979; 4. "Samurai" Released: 1980

Dschinghis Khan (released internationally as Genghis Khan) is the debut studio album by German disco group Dschinghis Khan. The album includes the band's breakthrough single, also called "Dschinghis Khan", with which they represented Germany at the Eurovision Song Contest 1979, finishing in 4th position. Included is also the follow-up "Moskau", a tribute to the Russian capital Moscow. Both singles were also released in English-language versions in certain markets, entitled "Genghis Khan" and "Moscow" respectively.

== Track listing ==
Original release

All tracks are written by Bernd Meinunger and Ralph Siegel, except where noted.

Side A
No.	Title	Writer(s)	Length
1.	"Moskau"		5:58
2.	"Komm doch heim" ("Come Home")		4:16
3.	"Samurai"		4:56
4.	"Rocking Son of Dschinghis Khan"		4:15
5.	"Pass auf, der Drache kommt" ("Watch Out, the Dragon Is Coming")	Meinunger; Steve Bender	3:40

Side B
No.	Title	Writer(s)	Length
1.	"Dschinghis Khan"		3:00
2.	"Israel, Israel"		5:38
3.	"China Boy"	Norbert Daum; Werner Schüler	3:54
4.	"Sahara"	Siegel; Kurt Hertha	3:00
5.	"Puszta" ("Sheer")	Meinunger; Leslie Mándoki	3:15
6.	"Der Verräter" ("The Traitor")		5:35

Japanese bonus track
No.	Title	Length
12.	"Hadschi Halef Omar"	3:48

Australian release

Side A
No.	Title	Writer(s)	Length
1.	"Moscow" (English Version)	Christian Dornaus; Meinunger; Siegel	4:30
2.	"Israel, Israel"		5:44
3.	"Genghis Khan" (English Version)	Dornaus; Meinunger; Siegel	3:08
4.	"China Boy"	Daum; Schüler	4:02
5.	"Rome" (English Version)	Fred Jay; Meinunger; Siegel	5:54
6.	"Samurai"		4:44

Side B
No.	Title	Writer(s)	Length
1.	"Moskau"		4:32
2.	"Desert Land" (English)	Dornaus; Meinunger; Siegel	3:04
3.	"Der Verräter"		5:36
4.	"Rocking Son of Dschinghis Khan" (English Version)	Dornaus; Meinunger; Siegel	3:58
5.	"Puszta"	Meinunger; Mándoki	3:18
6.	"The Strangers" (English)	Jay; Meinunger; Siegel	5:16

== Charts ==
=== Weekly charts ===
Chart (1979)	Peak position
German Albums (Offizielle Top 100)	8

=== Year-end charts ===
Chart (1979)	Position
German Albums (Offizielle Top 100)	46
