= Wir sitzen alle im selben Boot =

Studio album by Dschinghis Khan
- Released: 1981
- Recorded: 1980
- Studio: Olympia Studios Munich
- Genre: Disco
- Length: 39:58
- Languages: German; English
- Label: Jupiter Records
- Producer: Ralph Siegel

Dschinghis Khan chronology
Rom (1980)	Wir sitzen alle im selben Boot (1981)	Helden, Schurken & der Dudelmoser (1982)

Singles from Wir sitzen alle im selben Boot
- 1. "Pistolero" Released: 1981; 2. "Loreley" Released: 1981; 3. "Wir sitzen alle im selben Boot" Released: 1981; 4. "What Shall We Do with the Drunken Sailor" Released: 1981

Wir sitzen alle im selben Boot (German for We Are All in the Same Boat) is the third album released by German disco group Dschinghis Khan. It features the singles "Pistolero", "Loreley", "Wir sitzen alle im selben Boot", and "What Shall We Do with the Drunken Sailor". "Pistolero" and "Loreley" were also recorded in English and released internationally. In addition, "Pistolero" was recorded in Spanish and released in Latin American markets. At the time of the album's release, the group was reduced from six to five members, with Steve Bender having left the group prior to the album's recording.

== Track listing ==
All tracks are written by Bernd Meinunger and Ralph Siegel, except where noted.

Side A
No.	Title	Writer(s)	Length
1.	"Wir sitzen alle im selben Boot" ("We Are All in the Same Boat")		4:03
2.	"Pistolero"		4:17
3.	"Windjammer"		3:58
4.	"Die Fremdenlegion (Armee der verlorenen Seelen)" ("The Foreign Legion (Army of Lost Souls)")		4:30
5.	"Michael"	Traditional; Tony Saletan	4:18

Side B
No.	Title	Writer(s)	Length
1.	"Loreley"		4:10
2.	"What Shall We Do with the Drunken Sailor"	Traditional	3:54
3.	"Goodbye Hawaii"		4:43
4.	"Aladin"	Leslie Mándoki; Meinunger	3:25
5.	"We Love You"	Wolfgang Heichel	2:40

== Charts ==
Chart (1981)	Peak position
German Albums (Offizielle Top 100)	52
