= Kuori =

Studio album by Ruoska
- Released: 2002
- Genres: Industrial metal; hard rock; alternative metal
- Length: 42:06
- Label: Kråklund Records
- Producer: Tuomo Valtonen

Ruoska chronology
Kuori (2002)	Riisu (2003)

Kuori is Finnish industrial metal band Ruoska's first album, released in 2002.

== Track listing ==
1. Kuori (2:51) ('Shell')
2. Koti (3:52) ('Home')
3. Kiroan (3:55) ('I Curse')
4. Ruma rakkaus (4:26) ('Ugly Love')
5. Perkeleet (3:45) ('Devils')
6. Epilogi (3:41) ('Epilogue')
7. Propagandaa (4:39) ('Propaganda')
8. Aurinko ei nouse (4:04) ('The Sun Doesn't Rise')
9. Armo (3:29) ('Mercy')
10. Moraoikeus (4:18) ('Knife's Justice')
11. Suomi lukuina (3:06) ('Finland in Numbers')

== Personnel ==
Band members during the recording of the album:

- Patrik Mennander – vocals
- Anssi Auvinen – guitar
- Kai Ahvenranta – guitar
- Mika Kamppi – bass
- Sami Karppinen – drums

== Music videos ==
These are the music videos that were made from songs from this album:

- 3. Kiroan
- 6. Epilogi
