= Amortem =

Studio album by Ruoska
- Released: 14 June 2006
- Genre: Industrial metal
- Length: 44:00
- Label: EMI
- Producer: Tero-Pekka Virtanen

Ruoska chronology
Radium (2005)	Amortem (2006)	Rabies (2008)

Amortem is Finnish industrial metal band Ruoska's fourth album, released on 14 June 2006.

== Track listing ==
1. "Intro" – 1.55
2. "Amortem" – 5.02
3. "Pure minua" – 4.09 ('Bite Me')
4. "Taivas palaa" – 4.21 ('The Sky is Burning')
5. "Järvet jäihin jää" – 4.45 ('The Lakes Remain Frozen')
6. "Sika" – 3.44 ('Pig')
7. "Viiden tähden helvetti" – 3.27 ('Five-star Hell')
8. "Mies yli laidan" – 3.32 ('Man Overboard')
9. "Tuonen orjat" – 4.21 ('Slaves of the Death')
10. "Alasin" – 4.23 ('Anvil')
11. "Kesä tulla saa" – 4.23 ('Summer may Come')

== Personnel ==
- Patrik Mennander – vocals
- Anssi Auvinen – guitar
- Kai Ahvenranta – guitar
- Mika Kamppi – bass
- Sami Karppinen – drums

== Singles ==
"Mies yli laidan" is the first single and reached number ten on Finnish Singles Charts, "Pure minua" is the second single, "Alasin" is the third single. Findance.com gave "Mies yli laidan" and "Alasin" a ratings of seven out of ten and "Pure minua" a rating of eight out of ten.

== Music videos ==
These are the songs from this album that were made into a music video:

- Mies yli laidan
- Alasin
