= Rabies (Ruoska album) =

Studio album by Ruoska
- Released: 9 April 2008
- Recorded: 2007
- Studios: Helsinki-Hämeenlinna, Finland
- Genre: Industrial metal
- Length: 40:32
- Label: EMI
- Producer: Hiili Hiilesmaa

Ruoska chronology
Amortem (2006)	Rabies (2008)

Professional ratings
Review scores
Source	Rating
AllMusic	3/5 stars

Rabies is Finnish industrial metal band Ruoska's fifth album, released on 9 April 2008.

== Track listing ==
1. Saarnaaja ('Preacher') - 4:56
2. Lihaa vasten lihaa ('Flesh Against Flesh') - 3:29
3. Helvettiin jäätynyt ('Frozen in Hell') - 3:59
4. Ei koskaan ('Never') - 4:12
5. Pirunkieli ('Devil's Tongue') - 3:39
6. Vankilani ('My Prison') - 4:56
7. Valtaa, väkivaltaa ('Power, Violence') - 3:18
8. Pakkomielle ('Obsession') - 3:37
9. Porttikielto taivaaseen ('Banned from Heaven') - 4:00
10. Sotasokea ('Warblind') - 4:18

== Personnel ==
Band members during the recording of the album:

- Patrik Mennander – vocals
- Anssi Auvinen – guitar
- Mika Kamppi – bass
- Sami Karppinen – drums

== Singles ==
"Pirunkieli" ("Devil's tongue" in Finnish), the first single from the album, was released digitally on the band's official MySpace page in December 2007.

"Helvettiin jäätynyt" is the second single. In Finnish, "Helvettiin jäätynyt" means frozen in hell. This single features two songs ("Irti" and "Kosketa", both of which are on the Radium album) that were remixed by the lead singer of Turmion Kätilöt, MC Raaka Pee. The single charted number 12 on the Official Finnish Charts.

"Lihaa vasten lihaa" is the third single. It was released digitally on the band's official MySpace page in March 2008.

"Ei koskaan" ("Never" in Finnish) is the fourth and last single. It was released digitally on the band's official MySpace page in April 2008 and on EMI's website (along with the music video).

Findance.com gave the singles "Helvettiin jäätynyt" and "Ei koskaan" both a rating of seven out of ten.
