= Doombound =

Studio album by Battlelore
- Released: January 26, 2011
- Recorded: 2010
- Studio: Sound Supreme Studios, Hämeenlinna, Finland
- Genre: Symphonic metal, gothic metal
- Length: 54:04
- Label: Napalm
- Producer: Battlelore, Janne Saksa

Battlelore chronology
The Last Alliance (2008)	Doombound (2011)

Digipak cover

Professional ratings
Review scores
Source	Rating
About.com	2/5 stars
AllMusic	4/5 stars
Lords of Metal	(82/100)
Metal Storm	(8.3/10)
Musik Reviews	7/15 stars
Stormbringer	4/5 stars

Doombound is the sixth album by the Finnish symphonic metal band Battlelore, released on January 26, 2011. It was their final album before their hiatus. A digipak version including the CD, a bonus DVD, and a poster is available at Napalm Records website, which also released a sample for the song "Kärmessurma".

According to the band's blog:

We will begin the recordings of our next album in early June at Sound Supreme Studios (Hämeenlinna, Finland) with Janne Saksa, who will engineer and produce the album. The legendary Dan Swanö will do the mixing and mastering and hopefully, we'll get the whole battle package out in early fall of 2010. Stylistically, we have turned back to the old school style of songs with grinding drums and fast guitars! This will also be our first concept album and the songs will relate the story of Tolkien's tragic hero Túrin Turambar.

== Track listing ==
All music and lyrics by Battlelore.

No.	Title	Length
1.	"Bloodstained"	04:34
2.	"Iron of Death"	04:42
3.	"Bow and Helm"	03:56
4.	"Enchanted"	05:40
5.	"Kärmessurma"	04:23
6.	"Olden Gods"	04:21
7.	"Fate of the Betrayed"	05:08
8.	"Men as Wolves"	04:38
9.	"Last of the Lords"	05:43
10.	"Doombound"	08:02
11.	"Kielo" (instrumental)	02:57
Total length:		54:04

=== 10 Years of Battlelore - bonus DVD ===
- Live at Club Nosturi, Helsinki, Finland June 27, 2008
- Live at Club Nosturi, Helsinki, Finland January 1, 2009
- "Evernight over Europe" Tour 2007
- "The Last Alliance" Tour in Finland 2008
- Photo galleries
- Music videos:
1. "Third Immortal"
2. "House of Heroes"
3. "Storm of the Blade"
4. "Journey to Undying Lands"

== Credits ==
Band members

- Kaisa Jouhki – vocals
- Tomi Mykkänen – vocals
- Jussi Rautio – guitar
- Jyri Vahvanen – guitar
- Timo Honkanen – bass
- Henri Vahvanen – drums
- Maria Honkanen – keyboards, flute

Additional musicians

- Markus Vuoristo - cello on "Doombound" and "Kielo"
- Dan Swanö - guitar solo on "Last of the Lords"
- Janne Saksa - backing vocals

Production

- Janne Saksa - producer, engineer
- Dan Swanö - mixing, mastering

== Release history ==
The specific release dates follow:

- January 26, 2011 – ESP/FIN/SWE
- January 28, 2011 – GAS/BENELUX/ITA
- January 31, 2011 – Rest of Europe
- February 8, 2011 – USA/CAN
