= Aivar Riisalu =

Estonian politician

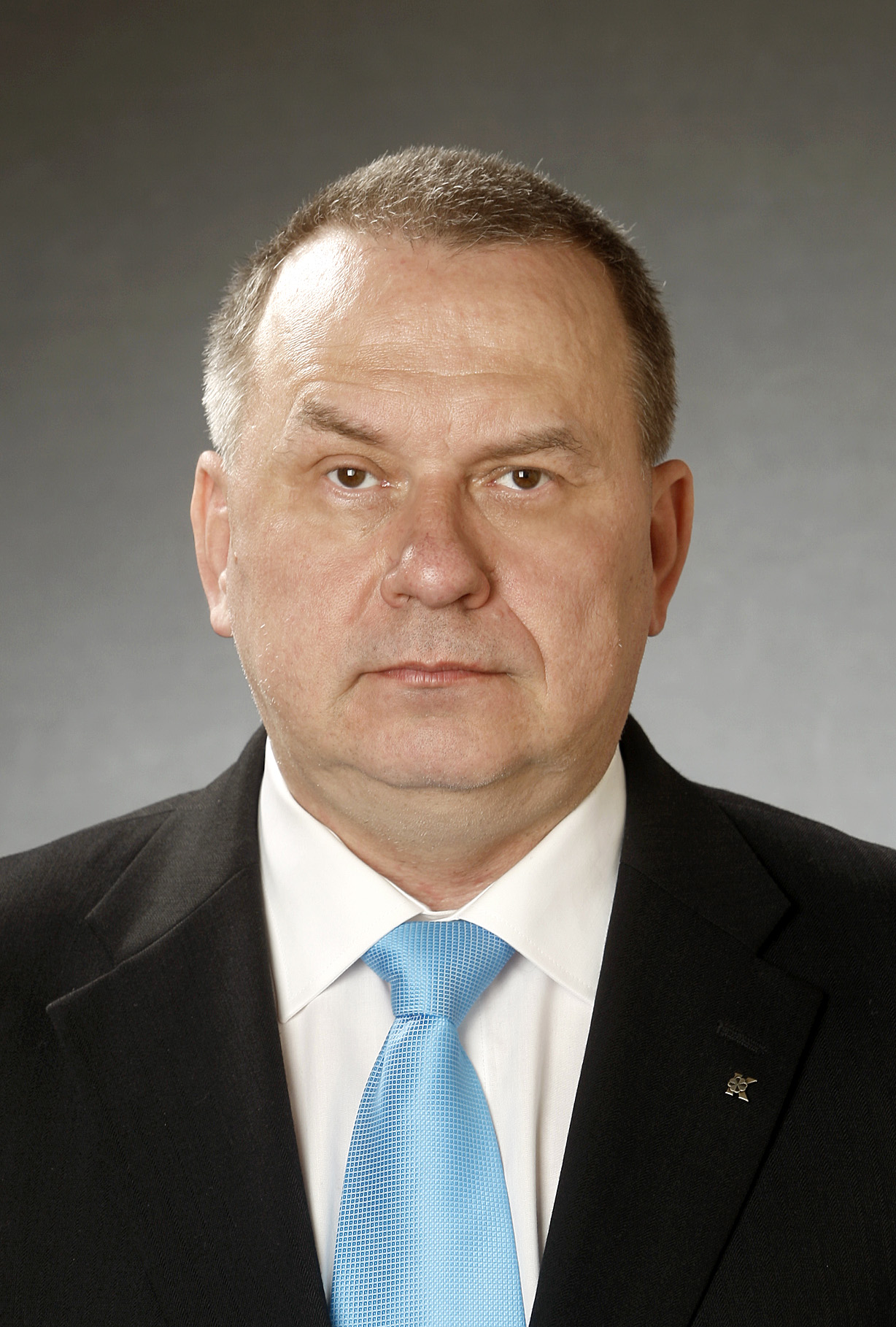
Aivar Riisalu in 2011

Aivar Riisalu (born 13 March 1961, Märjamaa) is an Estonian singer, businessman and politician. He has been member of XI and XII Riigikogu.

He was the singer for the popular ensemble Meie Mees. He is a member of Estonian Centre Party.
