= Moskau (song) =

1979 single by Dschingis Khan

Single by Dschinghis Khan

from the album Dschinghis Khan
- Language: German
- English title: Moscow
- B-side: "Rocking Son of Dschinghis Khan"
- Released: 1979
- Recorded: 1979
- Studio: Olympia Studios Munich
- Genre: Eurodisco
- Length: 4:43; 5:58 (album)
- Label: BMG
- Songwriters: Ralph Siegel; Bernd Meinunger
- Producer: Ralph Siegel

Dschinghis Khan singles chronology
"Dschinghis Khan" (1979)	"Moskau" (1979)	"Hadschi Halef Omar" (1979)

Music videos
- "Moskau" on YouTube
- "Moskau" (2020 Moscow Edition) on YouTube

"Moscow"

Single by Genghis Khan

from the album Genghis Khan
- B-side: "Moscow (Russian Version)"
- Released: 3 September 1980
- Recorded: 1979
- Studio: Olympia Studios Munich
- Genre: Eurodisco
- Length: 4:30
- Label: 7 Records / Image Records
- Songwriters: Ralph Siegel; Bernd Meinunger; Christian Dornaus
- Producer: Norbert Daum

Music videos
- "Moscow" on YouTube

"Moskau" (German for Moscow) is the second single by West German Eurodisco group Dschinghis Khan (known as Genghis Khan in Australia and other countries) released in 1979.

The band also recorded an English version, which they released in 1980 as "Moscow".

== History ==
A 15-second snippet of the song was scheduled to be broadcast as part of the 1980 New Year's Eve television special, but this ultimately did not happen.

In 2006, the song made its video game debut as a playable song in Taiko no Tatsujin Portable 2. On 15 September, the song was uploaded to YouTube, and it quickly became an internet meme related to Slavs. Most prominently, the meme was circulated on the image macro site YTMND, accompanied by the song's chorus or variations of it.

The song was also played at the opening at the Eurovision Song Contest 2009 in Moscow, Russia for Semi-Final 2.

"Moskau" was covered by Dancing Bros., and became a featured track in Just Dance 2014.

In 2018, Dschinghis Khan re-recorded "Moskau" with new lyrics for the 2018 FIFA World Cup, which was hosted in Russia. For the German and English versions, the lead vocals were performed by former US5 member Jay Khan. Alexander Malinin and his daughter Ustinya performed the Russian version, titled "Moskva". The Spanish version, titled "Moscú", was performed by Jorge Jiménez and Marifer Medrano.

== Versions ==
=== Moskau – the German-language version ===
"Moskau", the German-language version of the song, appears on their 1979 self-titled album Dschinghis Khan and their 1980 album Rom. The album version is nearly six minutes long, while the single version is four and a half minutes long.

=== Moscow – the English-language version ===
The band, under their English-language band name Genghis Khan, released a version of the song with English lyrics entitled "Moscow" in Australia in 1980, the year of the 1980 Moscow Olympics. Australia's Channel 7 used the song as the theme to their television coverage of the Moscow Olympics, and the single was issued locally in a die-cut Channel 7 paper sleeve. The song became a massive hit in Australia, staying at #1 for six weeks. There is also a long version in English.

=== Rocking Son of Dschinghis Khan ===
"Rocking Son of Dschinghis Khan" is the B-side of "Moskau", featuring Leslie Mándoki performing the chorus and Louis Hendrik Potgieter singing the final chorus. The song was also recorded in English and released as a single in 1979, with "Moscow" as the B-side.

== Track listings ==
Original German 7" single
No.	Title	Writer(s)	Length
1.	"Moskau"	Ralph Siegel; Bernd Meinunger	4:43
2.	"Rocking Son of Dschinghis Khan"	Siegel; Meinunger	4:13
Total length:			8:56

12" maxi single
No.	Title	Writer(s)	Length
1.	"Moskau"	Siegel; Meinunger	7:40
2.	"Rocking Son of Dschinghis Khan"	Siegel; Meinunger	6:10
Total length:			13:50

International single
No.	Title	Writer(s)	Length
1.	"Moscow" (English Version)	Christian Dornaus; Siegel; Meinunger	4:30
2.	"Moskau" (German Version)	Siegel; Meinunger	4:43
Total length:			9:13

Rocking Son of Dschinghis Khan
No.	Title	Writer(s)	Length
1.	"Rocking Son of Dschinghis Khan" (English Version)	Dornaus; Siegel; Meinunger	4:15
2.	"Moscow" (English Version)	Dornaus; Siegel; Meinunger	4:29
Total length:			8:44

== Charts ==
=== Weekly charts ===
Chart (1979–80)	Peak position
Australia (Kent Music Report)	1
Austria (Ö3 Austria Top 40)	16
Netherlands (Dutch Top 40)	38
Netherlands (Single Top 100)	38
Switzerland (Schweizer Hitparade)	11
West Germany (GfK)	3

=== Year-end charts ===
Chart (1979)	Position
West Germany (Official German Charts)	9
Chart (1980)	Position
Australia (Kent Music Report)	16

== Certifications ==
Region	Certification	Certified units/sales
Australia (ARIA)	Platinum	100,000^{^}
^{^} Shipments figures based on certification alone.

== Covers and remixes ==
- The song was covered in Japanese as "Mezase Moscow" (めざせモスクワ, Mezase Mosukuwa) by Dark Ducks in 1979. Another Japanese version by Baobab Singers was released that year, but with different lyrics that reference anime and tokusatsu titles that the voice actors under Production Baobab worked on.
- The song has been covered by a German rock band named Attila der Partykönig.
- The song has been covered by the German ska-punk band "Wisecräcker".
- Sofia Rotaru had recorded a Russian cover version in preparation for the 1980 Summer Olympics, but due to West Germany joining the 1980 Summer Olympics boycott, it was never broadcast and had been ordered destroyed. A single monoaural copy survived, made by the studio workers, and has been made available since.
- In Finland "Moskau" was covered by Juhamatti with the title "Volga" in 1980. "Volga" has since been performed by artists such as Kari Tapio and Frederik.
- Also in 1980, Cassiano Costa made the Brazilian Portuguese version, named "Moscou".
- This song was also covered by Hong Kong pop singer George Lam as "Olympics in Moscow" (Chinese: 世運在莫斯科), to celebrate the 1980 Summer Olympics.
- Georgie Dann made a Spanish version in 1980, with more success in Spanish-speaking countries than the original version.
- Swedish group Vikingarna recorded a cover in Swedish, "Moskva", in 1980.
- In live performances of their song "Sacrament of Wilderness", the symphonic metal band Nightwish plays a riff from "Moskau" at about the three-minute mark of the song.
- German black metal band Black Messiah covered the song on their 2006 album Of Myths and Legends.
- Estonian band Meie Mees covered the song as "Moskva" in 2000.
- In China, a version with altered lyrics called "Fen Dou" (奋斗) was made by Da Zhangwei (大张伟).
- South Korean group Koyote played a portion in their single "Aza! Aza!" (아자! 아자!).
- Since 2008 or earlier, Russian Armed Forces military bands have occasionally played the song at public events in Russia. Channel One Russia's New Years 2013 program included a version of the song sung in both German and Russian by the Alexandrov Ensemble.
- A version sung by Lolita Milyavskaya in the 2010 Musical Film Morozko (Морозко), aired on Russia 1 on 31 December 2010. Nikolai Baskov stars in this one.
- In the Czech Republic, the parody band Los Rotopedos produced a cover of the song in 2012. Los Rotopedos subsequently qualified to the top ten in the Český slavík song competition.
- In 2013, the song was covered by a French band Dancing Bros. and used in the video game Just Dance 2014.
- As part of their 2014 album "Pizza Napolitana", Trabant 33 released "Casa Bella", a slowed-down, instrumental, Italian-coded take on the Moskau melody.
- In 2018, Japanese DJ-producer Camellia remixed Moskau as a free-download bootleg in hands-up trance genre.
- American power metal band Last Alliance covered "Moskau" in 2011. The song was made available as a free download in 2018 to celebrate the 2018 FIFA World Cup hosted in Russia.
- In early 2020, Dutch DJ & Producer Thommy van Straalen started rising to fame after releasing a Big Room House Festival Mix as a collab with his neighbor Likkerstan 'LSTN' Ten Nogmeer. It was deleted midway through May after a copyright problem with Dschinghis Khan.
- In 2020, Norwegian hardstyle DJ & producer duo Da Tweekaz released their remixed version of this song with Austrian DJ & producer duo Harris & Ford.
- Klezmer-punk act Daniel Kahn, alongside Psoy Korolenko, released a trilingual Yiddish-, Russian-, and English-language cover, “Moskve,” in 2020.
- German YouTuber Jarow made a cover of the song about Norwegian footballer Erling Haaland. It went viral on TikTok in 2021. This cover went viral once again in Summer 2026, as part of a wider trend of Haaland-related memes stemming from Norway's run in the 2026 FIFA World Cup.
- The song "Ami" by Rika Zarai is sung to the same melody as "Moskau".
