= Radium (Ruoska album) =

Studio album by Ruoska
- Released: 22 March 2005
- Genre: Industrial metal
- Length: 43:20
- Label: Kråklund Records
- Producers: Tuomo Valtonen & Ruoska

Ruoska chronology
Riisu (2003)	Radium (2005)	Amortem (2006)

Radium is the third album by Finnish industrial metal band Ruoska, released on 22 March 2005. Two remixes of the song "Kosketa" were included on the Tuonen viemää and Helvettiin jäätynyt singles. A remix of "Irti" was also included on Helvettiin jäätynyt single.

== Track listing ==
1. "Veriura" ('Fuller') - 4:20
2. "Kosketa" ('Touch') - 3:51
3. "Käärmeenpesä" ('Serpent's Nest') - 4:57
4. "Irti" ('Off!') - 3:43
5. "Tuonen viemää" (Taken by death) - 3:47
6. "Kiiraslapsi" ('Purgatory Child') - 3:55
7. "Multaa ja loskaa" ('Soil and Slush') - 3:52
8. "Narua" ('String') - 3:59
9. "Rumavirsi" ('Ugly Hymn') - 3:25
10. "Herraa hyvää kiittäkää" ('Thank the Good Lord') - 3:29
11. "Isän kädestä" ('By fathers hand') - 4:01

== Personnel ==
Band members during the recording of the album:

- Patrik Mennander – vocals
- Anssi Auvinen – guitar
- Kai Ahvenranta – guitar
- Mika Kamppi – bass
- Sami Karppinen – drums

== Single ==
"Tuonen viemää" was released as a single and a music video. It reached number nine on Finnish Singles Charts. Findance.com gave the single a rating of seven out of ten.
