= ...Where the Shadows Lie =

- Cover to the standard edition of the album by Ted Nasmith

Studio album by Battlelore
- Released: August 13, 2002
- Recorded: July–November 2001
- Studios: Music Bros Studios, Imatra, Finland
- Genres: Melodic death metal, gothic metal, power metal
- Length: 46:59
- Label: Napalm
- Producer: Miitri Aaltonen

Battlelore chronology
...Where the Shadows Lie (2002)	Sword's Song (2003)

Professional ratings
Review scores
Source	Rating
AllMusic	4/5 stars

...Where the Shadows Lie is the first full-length album by the Finnish heavy metal band Battlelore, released in 2002. The album received good reviews and gained the band a loyal fan base. No singles were released from the album, although a video was filmed for the song "Journey to Undying Lands", used to promote the band throughout Europe. After the release of this album in 2002, guitarist Tommi Havo had to leave the band for personal reasons and was replaced by Jussi Rautio.

The album cover features an image of Morgoth, painted by Ted Nasmith in 1998, titled "Morgoth and High King of Noldor" (used with permission).

== Track listing ==
All lyrics are written by Jyri Vahvanen; all music is composed by Battlelore, except where indicated.

No.	Title	Length
1.	"Swordmaster"	5:36
2.	"The Grey Wizard"	4:17
3.	"Raging Goblin"	4:35
4.	"Journey to Undying Lands"	5:50
5.	"Shadowgate" (Battlelore & Miitri Aaltonen)	4:04
6.	"Fangorn"	5:05
7.	"The Green Maid"	3:44
8.	"Khazad-Dûm Pt.1 (Ages of Mithril)"	5:20
9.	"Ride with the Dragons"	4:17
10.	"Feast for the Wanderer" (Hidden track, not mentioned on back cover track listing. Music by Jyrki Myllärinen)	4:05
Total length:		46:59

== Personnel ==
Band members

- Kaisa Jouhki – vocals
- Patrik Mennander – vocals
- Tommi Havo – guitar
- Jyri Vahvanen – guitar
- Miika Kokkola – bass
- Henri Vahvanen – drums
- Maria Honkanen – keyboards

Guest musicians

- Jyrki Myllärinen – classical guitars

Production

- Miitri Aaltonen - producer, engineer, mixing
- Pauli Saastamoinen - mastering

== Lyrical references ==
- "Swordmaster" describes the preparations for battle of a Rohirrim.
- "The Grey Wizard" is about the story of Gandalf up to The Two Towers.
- "Raging Goblin" makes references to the Goblin and Olog-hai races.
- "Journey to Undying Lands" tells the story of the land of Aman, final refuge of the Elves.
- "Shadowgate" is about Minas Morgul.
- "Fangorn" is about the Ents and their attack on Isengard.
- "The Green Maid" is about Lúthien Tinúviel.
- "Khazad-Dûm Pt. 1 (Ages of Mithril)" is about the dawn of Moria.
- "Ride with the Dragons" deals with Morgoth's creation of the dragons.
