= Evernight (album) =

- Cover art from the modified work 'Tol Bandir' by Ted Nasmith

Studio album by Battlelore
- Released: 26 February 2007
- Studio: Music Bros Studios, Imatra, Finland
- Genre: Folk metal, power metal, gothic metal
- Length: 42:56
- Label: Napalm
- Producer: Miitri Aaltonen, Battlelore

Battlelore chronology
Third Age of the Sun (2005)	Evernight (2007)	The Last Alliance (2008)

Alternative cover
- Special edition Digipak cover

Professional ratings
Review scores
Source	Rating
About.com	3.5/5 stars
Metal Storm	(8/10)
Metal.de	(7/10)
Stormbringer	(3.5/5)

Evernight is the fourth studio album by the Finnish heavy metal band Battlelore, released in 2007. As previously, the songs are all based on J. R. R. Tolkien's Middle-earth. Overall the sound of the album was darker and denser than the band's earlier releases with a much thicker and heavier guitar sound. The album also was more consistent in sound with less variation between songs to present a more cohesive piece of work. In this album the band choose not to use names and direct references to Tolkien's legendarium to make the lyrics accessible to a broader audience.

== Track listing ==
All lyrics are written by Jyri Vahvanen, except "Summon the Wolves" by Vahvanen & Tomi Mykkänen and "Beneath the Waves" by Vahvanen & Jussi Rautio

No.	Title	Music	Length
1.	"House of Heroes"	Jussi Rautio, Battlelore	4:06
2.	"Ocean's Elysium"	Tomi Mykkänen, Battlelore	4:16
3.	"Summon the Wolves"	Rautio, Battlelore	4:34
4.	"We Are the Legions"	Jyri Vahvanen, Battlelore	3:58
5.	"Into the New World"	Vahvanen, Battlelore	6:32
6.	"Longing Horizon"	Rautio, Battlelore	4:35
7.	"Mask of Flies"	Vahvanen, Battlelore	4:51
8.	"The Cloak and the Dagger"	Vahvanen, Battlelore	4:35
9.	"Beneath the Waves"	Rautio, Battlelore	5:23
10.	"The Tale of the Downfall" (Digipak edition bonus track)	Battlelore	3:26
11.	"Doom and Oblivion" (Digipak edition bonus track)	Battlelore	3:20
Total length:			49:45

== Personnel ==
Band members

- Kaisa Jouhki - vocals
- Tomi Mykkänen - vocals
- Jussi Rautio - guitar, backing vocals
- Jyri Vahvanen - guitar, backing vocals
- Timo Honkanen - bass
- Henri Vahvanen - drums
- Maria Honkanen - keyboards

Production

- Miitri Aaltonen - producer, engineer, mixing
- Mika Jussila - mastering at Finnvox Studios
