= The Last Alliance (album) =

Studio album by Battlelore
- Released: September 24, 2008
- Recorded: April–May 2008
- Studio: Sound Supreme Studios, Hämeenlinna, Finland
- Genre: Symphonic metal, gothic metal, power metal
- Length: 53:42
- Label: Napalm
- Producer: Janne Saksa, Battlelore

Battlelore chronology
Evernight (2007)	The Last Alliance (2008)	Doombound (2011)

Alternative cover
- Special edition Digipak cover

Professional ratings
Review scores
Source	Rating
Metal Review	(4.4/10)
Lords of Metal	(85/100)
Terrorizer	7/10 stars
Metal.de	8/10 stars

The Last Alliance is the fifth album by the Finnish heavy metal band Battlelore, released in 2008. It was issued as a jewel case CD and a digipack with a bonus DVD featuring footage of a live show at Metal Female Voices Fest in Wieze, Belgium in 2007.

It peaked at position 26 in The Official Finnish Charts.

== Track listing ==
All music and lyrics by Battlelore.

No.	Title	Length
1.	"Third Immortal"	04:45
2.	"Exile the Daystar"	04:45
3.	"The Great Gathering"	04:09
4.	"Guardians"	04:57
5.	"Voice of the Fallen"	04:09
6.	"Daughter of the Sun"	06:22
7.	"Green Dragon"	03:52
8.	"Awakening"	05:05
9.	"Epic Dreams"	04:25
10.	"Moontower"	04:51
11.	"The Star of High Hope"	06:25
Total length:		53:42

=== Bonus DVD ===
1. "Ghân of the Woods"
2. "Ocean's Elysium"
3. "Into the New World"
4. "Buccaneers Inn"
5. "We Are the Legions"
6. "House of Heroes"
7. "Beneath the Waves"
8. "Sons of Riddermark"

== Credits ==
Band members

- Kaisa Jouhki - vocals
- Tomi Mykkänen - vocals
- Jussi Rautio - guitar
- Jyri Vahvanen - guitar
- Timo Honkanen - bass
- Henri Vahvanen - drums
- Maria Honkanen - keyboards, flute

Production

- Janne Saksa - producer, engineer
- Dan Swanö - mixing, mastering

== Lyrical references ==
- "Third Immortal" deals with the wizard Radagast and his part in the defeat of Saruman.
- "Exile the Daystar" describes the effects of the Sun on the creatures of the dark.
- "The Great Gathering" is about the last alliance against Sauron at the end of the Second Age.
- "Guardians" makes reference to the eagles of Middle-Earth.
- "Voice of the Fallen" tells the story of the Mouth of Sauron.
- "Daughter of the Sun" is about Éowyn.
- "Green Dragon" is about the Green Dragon inn in Bywater.
- "Awakening" describes the creation of the Dwarves by the Vala Aulë.
- "Epic Dreams" deals with the dreams sent by the Vala Ulmo to the elven kings Turgon and Finrod Felagund.
- "Moontower" tells the story of Minas Ithil, the Tower of the Rising Moon.
- "The Star of High Hope" is about the voyages of Eärendil.

== See also ==
- The Last Alliance (band)
