= Mandoki Soulmates =

Music supergroup

- Mandoki Soulmates live on stage.

Background information
- Origin: Germany
- Genres: Rock, Jazz rock, Progressive rock
- Years active: 1992–present
- Past members: Leslie Mandoki; Ian Anderson; Jack Bruce; Al Di Meola; David Clayton-Thomas; Bobby Kimball; Mike Stern; Anthony Jackson; Bill Evans; Randy Brecker; Michael Brecker
- Website: mandoki-soulmates.com

The Mandoki Soulmates are a supergroup founded in Germany by Hungarian musician and producer Leslie Mandoki. The project features international musicians performing primarily progressive rock and jazz-rock fusion.

== History ==
Since 1992, the Mandoki Soulmates have released 12 studio albums and several live recordings. They have performed in New York, Shanghai, São Paulo, Miami, London and Paris. The group's lineup has included musicians who have collectively won 35 Grammy Awards and sold over 350 million records.

== Musicians ==
Numerous musicians have performed with the Mandoki Soulmates, including Chris Thompson (Manfred Mann's Earth Band), John Helliwell (Supertramp), Nick Van Eede (Cutting Crew), Greg Lake (Emerson, Lake & Palmer), Tony Carey (Rainbow), Richard Bona, Cory Henry, Steve Lukather (Toto) and Chaka Khan. German musicians Peter Maffay, Klaus Doldinger and Till Brönner have also played and recorded with the Soulmates. A complete listing is below.

== Founding of Mandoki Soulmates ==
Following advice from his father — "Live your dream and don't dream your life!" — in 1992 Mandoki formed the band "People" (later called Mandoki Soulmates). Musicians collaborated on a joint album, "Out of Key… With the Time." The band's founding members included Ian Anderson, Jack Bruce, Al Di Meola, David Clayton-Thomas (Blood, Sweat & Tears), Bobby Kimball (Toto), Mike Stern, Anthony Jackson, Bill Evans, Randy Brecker and Michael Brecker. They received the "Goldene Europa" German television award in 1993 for their debut song "Mother Europe." Subsequently, the band played their first concert at the second annual Sziget/EuroWoodstock Festival in 1994, held in Budapest before an audience of 40,000.

== Evolution of the Soulmates ==
Numerous musicians have collaborated with the Soulmates on recordings and performances throughout their history. A complete list of collaborators from 1992 to the present is provided below.

== Complete artists listing 1992–present ==
- Leslie Mandoki – vocals, drums, percussion
- Laszlo Bencker – keyboardist, grand piano, Hammond organ
- Chaka Khan – vocals
- Ian Anderson – vocals, flute
- Jack Bruce – vocals, bass
- Bobby Kimball – vocals
- David Clayton-Thomas – vocals
- Chris Thompson – vocals
- Peter Maffay – guitar, vocals
- Steve Lukather – guitar, vocals
- Eric Burdon – vocals
- Nik Kershaw – guitar, vocals
- Nick Van Eede – guitar, vocals
- Al Di Meola – guitar
- Till Brönner – trumpet
- Mike Stern – guitar
- Steve Khan – guitar
- Randy Brecker – trumpet, flugelhorn
- Michael Brecker – tenor saxophone
- Bill Evans – tenor, soprano saxophone
- John Helliwell – tenor, alto saxophone, clarinet
- Victor Bailey – bass
- Anthony Jackson – bass
- Pino Palladino – bass
- Greg Lake – guitar, vocals
- Mick Hucknall – vocals
- Roger Hodgson – guitar, piano, vocals
- Udo Lindenberg – vocals
- Lou Gramm – vocals
- Jimi Jamison – vocals
- Midge Ure – guitar, vocals
- Robin Gibb – vocals
- Paul Carrack – vocals
- Peter Frampton – guitar, vocals
- David Garrett – violin
- Manfred Mann – keyboards
- Jon Lord – Hammond organ, piano
- Jesse Siebenberg – lap steel guitar, vocals
- Steve Bailey – bass, vocals
- Richard Bona – bass, vocals

== Discography ==
Albums

=== As Mandoki (resp. Man Doki) ===
- 1992: Out of the Key...With the Time
- 1997: People in Room No.8
- 1997: People in Room No.8 - The Jazz Cuts

=== As People ===
- 1993: People
- 1998: So Far'

=== As Mandoki Soulmates ===
- 2002: Soulmates
- 2003: Soulmates Classics
- 2003: Soulmates Jazz Cuts
- 2004: Soulmates Legends of Rock
- 2009: Aquarelle
- 2010: Thank You
- 2013: BudaBest
- 2019: Living in the Gap
- 2019: Hungarian Pictures
- 2021: Utopia for Realists
- 2024: A Memory of Our Future

== Notable performances ==
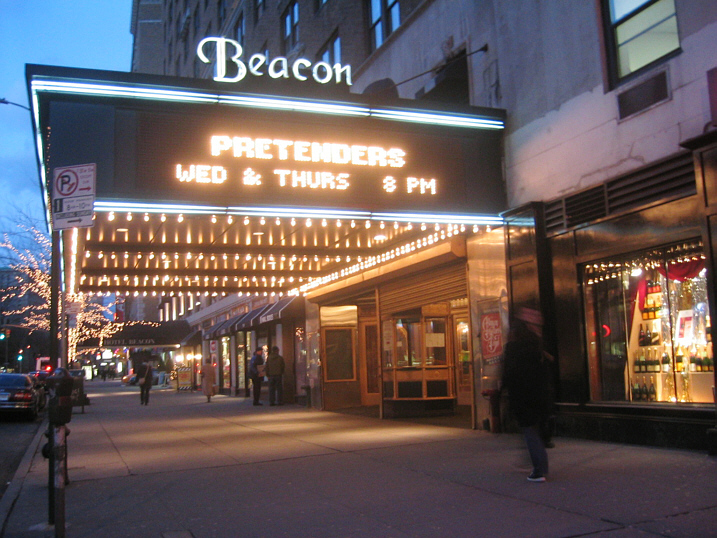
Beacon Theatre – 2124 Broadway, Manhattan, New York City

Mandoki Soulmates, led by Leslie Mandoki, performed their first live show in the U.S. during Grammy Week 2018. The concert, titled "Wings of Freedom," took place at the Beacon Theater on January 29, 2018, and served as a benefit concert for MusiCares foundation. The collaboration with MusiCares aligned with the group's mission to support musicians in need.

== Performance and recording philosophy ==
Mandoki has stated that he encourages his musical collaborators to express themselves in the studio and on stage. Jack Bruce compared Mandoki to Duke Ellington for his ability to foresee each musician's role when composing for the Soulmates. Mike Stern emphasized Mandoki's focus on creative freedom. Al Di Meola called him a "Hungarian Quincy Jones" and described him as the guiding force. Ian Anderson characterized Mandoki as a key contributor to the ensemble's collaboration.

Nick Van Eede, founder of Cutting Crew, has also commented on Mandoki's ability to work with artists. Chaka Khan noted Mandoki's work on inspiring collaboration and synergy. Randy Brecker credited Mandoki as the bandleader and emphasized the friendships cultivated within the band. Greg Lake, of Emerson, Lake & Palmer, described them as "one of the best bands you will ever hear."

== Social and political significance ==
The Soulmates address socio-political themes through their music, drawing on the tradition of progressive jazz rock. According to Mandoki, the group focuses on collaborative creativity rather than being solely a celebrity-driven project. The Soulmates' music incorporates themes reflecting the belief that music can serve as a platform for artistic integrity and social commentary through lyrics.

== Recent projects ==
Released on May 10, 2024, the band's latest album, "A Memory of Our Future," addresses socio-political issues. Recorded using analog techniques from the initial note to the final vinyl disc, the album is available on vinyl and digitally. A Dolby Atmos surround-sound version is also available.
