= The Last Alliance (band) =

- Origin: New York, United States
- Genres: Power metal, thrash metal
- Years active: 2002–present
- Label: Independent
- Website: thelastalliance.bandcamp.com/music

The Last Alliance is an American power metal band formed in New York in 2002.

== Biography ==
Last Alliance performs songs inspired by Game of Thrones and JRR Tolkien's Middle Earth, especially The Lord of the Rings and The Silmarillion. In 2011 they recorded an English language cover of Moskau by Dzhinghis Khan, which was re-released in 2018 as a free download to celebrate the 2018 Fifa World Cup held in Russia.

The current lineup includes John Ryan (vocals), Ryan Berg (bass), Dan Capeau (guitar), Chris Montalbo (keyboard), and Joe Murawski (drums).

== Critical response ==
The band received favorable reviews from the music magazine Metal Nexus and the website Reverb Nation, with critics comparing their sound to Blind Guardian. In 2017 they featured on Metal Nexus' showcase, State of the Art.

== Discography ==
=== Demo ===
- Dominion of Silence (2008)

=== Singles ===
- "Moskau" (2011)

=== Albums ===
- Out of the Ashes (2011)
- Lost in Legend (2013)

=== Extended plays ===
- Dangerous Days (2012)
- The Westeros Trilogy (2013)
- The Dawn (2013)
- An Oath Fulfilled (2016)
