= Meie Mees =

Estonian band

- Origin: Tallinn, Estonia
- Genres: Pop
- Years active: 1997–2007, 2008-
- Label: BGM Records
- Members: Aivar Riisalu; Margus Mõttus; Toomas Pae; Vahur Parve; Tarvi Jaago; Emil Oja
- Website: https://www.meiemees.ee

Meie Mees (English: Our Man) is a popular Estonian pop band, known for their cover versions of international hits with Estonian lyrics.

Between 2002 and 2007, they won the Estonian Pop Music Annual Awards as Best Band six years running. Their albums Pööning põleb, Kut senap sule, Klounide rünnak and Meieh rullaadid were awarded the title album of the year.

The band infrequently tours outside Estonia, but in 2005 they gave some concerts in Neegrionu Kontserdimaja.

== Discography ==
=== Albums ===
- Ära näe vaeva (1997)
- Piraat plaat (1998)
- Sina oled minu sõber (1999)
- Best of 2000 (1999)
- Teen tapeeti (2000)
- Pühi kogu perele (2001)
- Pööning põleb (2001) – Album of the Year 2002
- Kut senap sule (2002) – Album of the Year 2003
- Kutse napsule (2002)
- Lastelaulud (2002)
- Klounide rünnak (2003) – Album of the Year 2004
- Pest off 2004 (2004)
- Eesti mees on tantsulõvi (2004)
- Meieh rullaadid (2005) – Album of the Year 2006
- Jookse, põder! (2005)
- Laulud lastele (2006)
- Vaba mees (2006)
- Pest of the Pest (2007)
- Päike looja läks (2008)
- Puhal Kuld II (2013)
- Puhal Kuld I (2020)

=== DVD ===
- Karaoke (2004)
- Meieh rullaadid (2005)
