= Riisu =

Studio album by Ruoska
- Released: 9 September 2003
- Genres: Industrial metal; alternative metal
- Length: 42:17
- Label: Kråklund Records
- Producer: Tuomo Valtonen

Ruoska chronology
Kuori (2002)	Riisu (2003)	Radium (2005)

Riisu is Finnish industrial metal band Ruoska's second album, released on 9 September 2003.

== Background ==
In an interview, Patrik Mennander said the name Darmstadt (which is a city in Germany) and the chorus "Darmstadt - Road to heaven" originates from a dream former band guitarist Kai Ahvenranta had, in which he saw a sign saying "Darmstadt - Road to heaven", which inspired the song. He later remembered seeing the name Darmstadt on the wheels of a vehicle being used while he was working in the timber industry.

== Track listing ==
1. Elon tiellä ('On Life's Road') – 3:18
2. Puhe ('Speech') – 3:57
3. Darmstadt – 3:32
4. Kuka luopuisi kuolemastaan ('Who Would Abandon Death') – 3:41
5. Synkät soinnut, rujot riimit ('Dark Chords, Ugly Rhymes') – 3:22
6. Riisu ('Disrobe') – 3:56
7. Työmiehen haudalla ('On Worker's Grave') – 4:46
8. Rauta valittaa ('Iron Laments') – 4:00
9. Airut ('Herald') – 3:50
10. Maailmanlopun pyörä ('The Wheel of the End of the World') – 2:55
11. Piruparka ('Poor Sod') – 4:48

== Personnel ==
Band members during the recording of the album:

- Patrik Mennander – vocals
- Anssi Auvinen – guitar
- Kai Ahvenranta – guitar
- Mika Kamppi – bass
- Sami Karppinen – drums
