= Dschinghis Khan =

German Eurodisco pop band

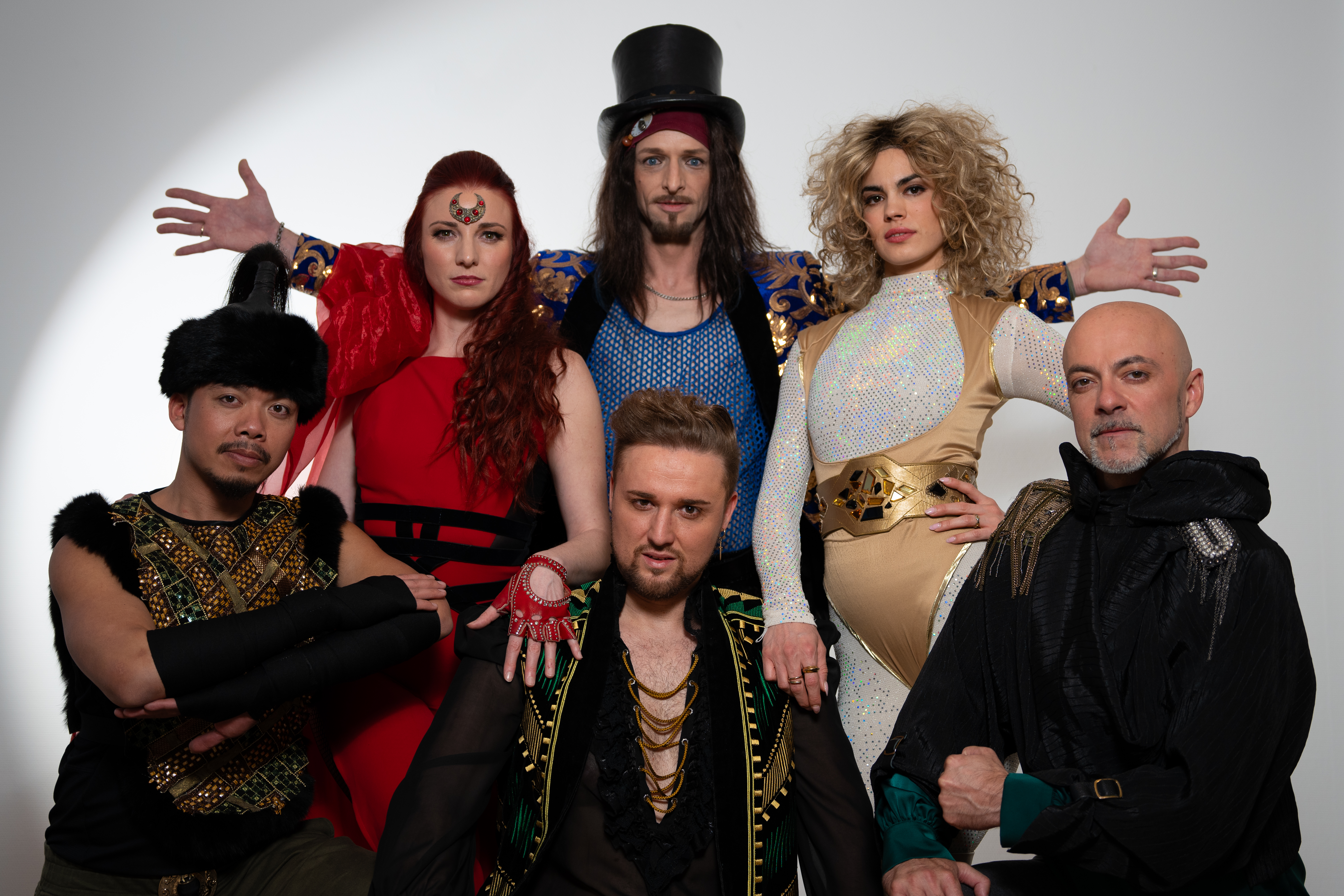
- The new Dschinghis Khan in 2023

Background information
- Origin: Munich, West Germany
- Genres: Eurodisco; folk; pop
- Years active: 1979–1985, 2005–present
- Labels: Jupiter Records; Columbia; Victor
- Members: Siegel lineup Claus Kupreit; Angelika Erlacher; Läm Virat Phetnoi; Marco Matias; Selina Kohl; Michael Thurner; Track lineup Stefan Track; Leila Melikova; Tatiana Gerisamova; Denis Loginov; Andrey Ivanoff
- Past members: Henriette Strobel; Edina Pop; Steve Bender (deceased); Louis Hendrik Potgieter (deceased); Leslie Mándoki; Wolfgang Heichel (deceased); Johannes Kupreit (deceased)
- Website: Siegel faction Track faction

Dschinghis Khan (German pronunciation: [ˌdʒɪŋɡɪs ˈkaːn]; lit. 'Genghis Khan') is a German Eurodisco pop band. It was originally formed in Munich in 1979 to compete in the Eurovision Song Contest with their song "Dschinghis Khan".

The original group consisted of six members: Louis Hendrik Potgieter, Edina Pop, Henriette Strobel, Wolfgang Heichel, Leslie Mándoki, and Steve Bender, who performed from 1979 to their first disbandment in 1985.

In 2005, the surviving Dschinghis Khan members reunited to recreate the music group that had been broken up, but years later they separately organized different bands all under the brand name "Dschinghis Khan".

== History ==
=== Beginning: 1979–1985 ===
The original 6 members, Wolfgang Heichel, Henriette Heichel, Louis Hendrik Potgieter, Leslie Mándoki, Edina Pop and Steve Bender

Dschinghis Khan was managed by German producer Ralph Siegel and choreographed by Hannes Winkler, one of the most famous German choreographers during that time. Their original eponymous song was written and produced by Siegel with lyrics by Bernd Meinunger and came in fourth place at the Eurovision Song Contest 1979 in Jerusalem, Israel. Their name is one of several possible German spellings (the most common is "Dschingis Khan") of the name of the historical figure Genghis Khan of the Mongol Empire. The only native Germans in the group were Karl-Heinz "Steve" Bender and Wolfgang Heichel, who brought his Dutch-born wife Henriette (née Strobel) with him. Louis Hendrik Potgieter (Genghis Khan) was South African. Edina Pop (Marika Késmárky) was a Hungarian who had started her singing career in West Germany in 1969. Leslie Mándoki, also Hungarian, had left Hungary in 1975.

In 1979, the group released the single "Moskau". A year later, the English version of "Moskau" topped the charts in Australia for six weeks, largely thanks to Seven Network using the song as the theme music for coverage of the 1980 Summer Olympics. In an interview with Russian television presenter Alexandra Glotova, the producer of the group Dschinghis Khan, Heinz Gross, said that in the 1980s, the group was banned in the Soviet Union and was accused of anti-communism and nationalism.

Following the success of the singles "Hadschi Halef Omar", "Rom", "Pistolero", and "Loreley", Dschinghis Khan underwent an image change, with their songs becoming more folk-oriented with their fourth album, Helden, Schurken & der Dudelmoser. As a result, their popularity waned. The group released their fifth album, Corrida, which served as the soundtrack to the musical of the same name by Siegel and Meinunger. After the release of the single "Mexico", Dschinghis Khan disbanded in 1985.

=== Post-disbandment: 1985–1994 ===
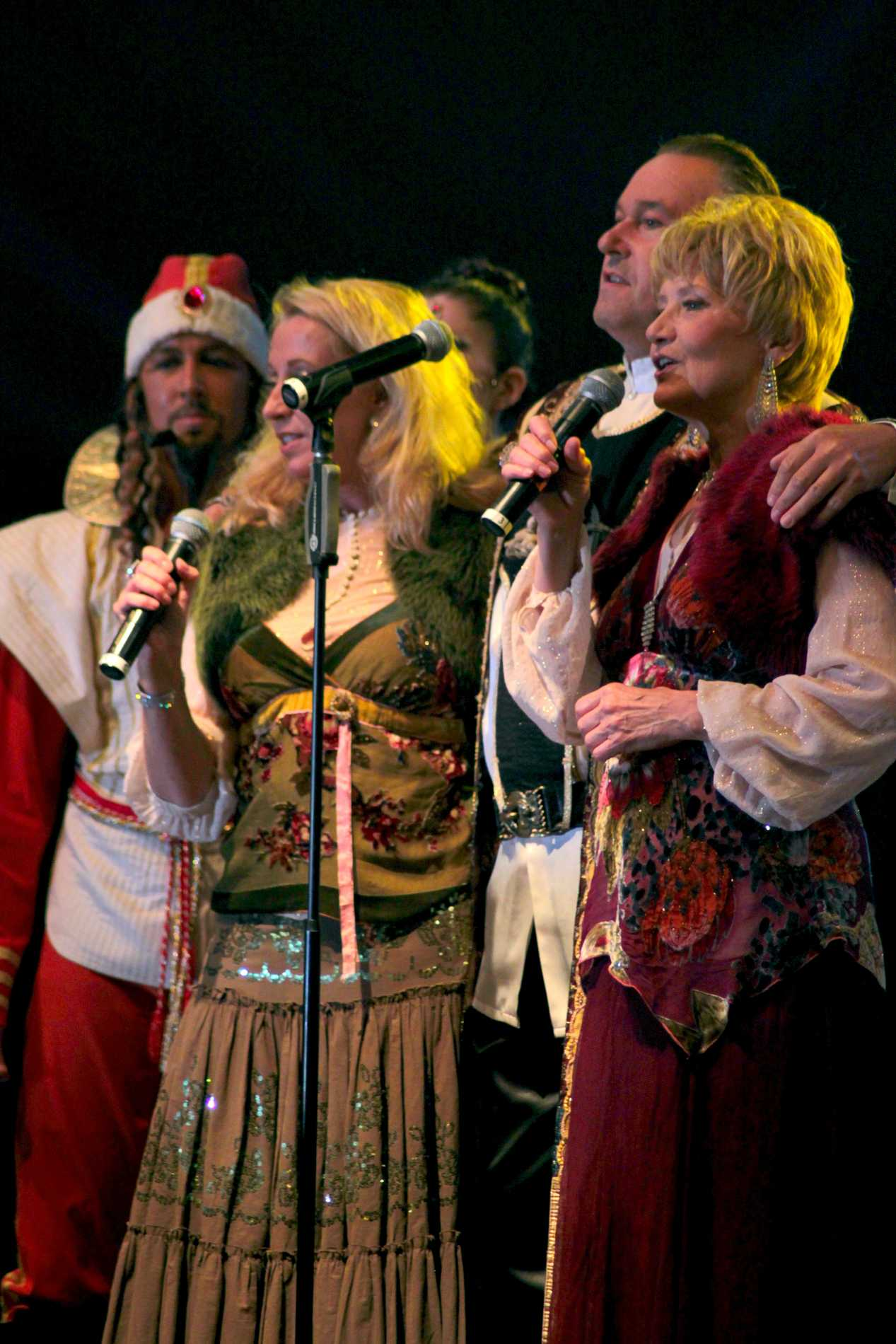
Henriette Strobel, Wolfgang Heichel and Edina Pop performing in 2009

Following Dschinghis Khan's disbandment, the members took different paths. Mándoki became a successful musician and producer while Pop pursued a solo singing career and Bender worked as a music producer. The success of the band eventually led to Wolfgang and Henriette's divorce in 1986, with Henriette reverting to her maiden name of Strobel.

In 1986, the group reunited as "Dschinghis Khan Family", but only with original members Strobel on vocals, Mándoki on drums, and Potgieter on keyboards. The song "Wir gehör'n zusammen" led them to a national qualifying round of the Eurovision Song Contest, where they finished in second place.

On 12 November 1994, Potgieter died of AIDS in South Africa.

=== Reunion: 2005–2018 ===
On 17 December 2005, Dschinghis Khan reunited at the Retro FM Festival in Moscow, with founding members Bender, Pop, Heichel, and Strobel joined by new members Stefan Track, Kaya Ebru, and Daniel Käsling. In May 2006, Bender died of cancer. The song "Wie Feuer im Wind" on the group's 2007 album 7 Leben was dedicated to both Potgieter and Bender.

In 2006, Track left the group and started his own solo project called Rocking Son. On July 15, Strobel, Heichel, and Pop were joined by the dance group The Legacy of Dschinghis Khan in a concert in Mongolia. The dance group consisted of Claus Kupreit, Corinna Günzel, Benjamin Schobel, Evi Weigand, Stefan Sauter, and Angelika Nimbach; Kupreit would go on to become a permanent member of Dschinghis Khan. In 2014, Heichel left the group due to creative differences.

=== Recent developments: 2018–present ===
In 2018, Dschinghis Khan re-recorded "Moskau" with new lyrics for the 2018 FIFA World Cup, which was hosted in Russia. For the German and English versions, the lead vocals were performed by former US5 member Jay Khan. Alexander Malinin and his daughter Ustinya performed the Russian version, titled "Moskva". The Spanish version, titled "Moscú", was performed by Jorge Jiménez and Marifer Medrano. At the same time, Heichel teamed up with Track to record the song "We Love Football". It was revealed that Heichel gained the rights to the Dschinghis Khan name in Germany and Spain. Strobel, Pop, Kupreit, and producer Heinz Gross also own the rights to the name Dschinghis Khan, with both group patents revealing the use of their own logos. As a result, there are two disco groups operating under the name Dschinghis Khan.

On 12 September 2020, dancer and singer Johannes Kupreit died in a car accident in Germany. Tributes were paid from the members and Dschinghis Khan fans from around the world. By the end of 2020, Pop and Strobel retired from their band. Meanwhile, the Heichel and Track faction of Dschinghis Khan released the studio album Here We Go, which is a mix of new songs and self-covers.

In July 2021, Siegel sued Heichel when the latter attempted to bar him from releasing the 2018 FIFA World Cup version of "Moskau" and claimed to have full ownership of the Dschinghis Khan name. The Munich Regional Court ruled in favor of Siegel and awarded him the trademark rights to the group, citing him as the group's original creator and producer and the group's prior disbandments did not affect his ownership rights.

In January 2022, Heichel posted a statement on his Facebook in regards to his split from Stefan Track's iteration of Dschinghis Khan, due to serious creative differences and the claim that Track's "Dschinghis Khan" account falsely claims to be the original Dschinghis Khan.

In 2023, the Siegel lineup was revamped with three new members: Marco Matias, Selina Kohl, and Michael Thurner.

On 20 January 2026, Heichel died at his home at the age of 75. His death was announced by his management on his official social media accounts.

== Members ==
Ralph Siegel lineup (1979–1985)

- Louis Hendrik Potgieter (1979–1985; 1951–1994)
- Edina Pop (1979–1985; b. 1941)
- Henriette Strobel (1979–1985; b. 1953)
- Wolfgang Heichel (1979–1985; 1950–2026)
- Leslie Mándoki (1979–1985; b. 1953)
- Steve Bender (1979–1981; 1946–2006)

Heinz Gross lineup (2005–2020), since 2018 in cooperation with Ralph Siegel

- Edina Pop (2005–2020)
- Henriette Strobel (2005–2020)
- Wolfgang Heichel (2005–2014)
- Steve Bender (2005; died 2006)
  Guest singers (2005)
  - Stefan Track (2005)
  - Ebru Kaya (as Eltuya Khan) (2005)
  - Daniel Käsling (as Ögödei Khan) (2005)
  The Legacy or The Legacy of Genghis Khan (2006–2020)
  - Claus Kupreit (as Prince Igei Khan) (2006–2020)
  - Tanja Müller (2006–2010)
  - Corinna Günzel (as Eltuya Khan) (2007–2014)
  - Evi Weigand (as Ohla Khan) (2007–2014)
  - Attila Mario Diallo (as Cash Khan) (2007–2014)
  - Benjamin Schobel (as Ögödei Khan) (2007–2011)
  - Stefan Sauter (as Yassa Khan) (2006–2011)
  - Angelika Nimbach (as Yesugan Khan) (2007–2008)
  - Johannes Kupreit (as Ögödei Khan) (2011–2020; died 2020)
  - Läm Virat Phetnoi (as Yassa Khan) (2012–2020)
  - Angelika Erlacher (as Eltuya Khan) (2016–2020)
  - Jan Großfeld (as Bärke Khan) (2019–2020)

Ralph Siegel lineup (since 2023)

- Claus Kupreit (as Prince Igei Khan) (2023–present)
- Angelika Erlacher (as Eltuya Khan) (2023–present)
- Läm Virat Phetnoi (as Yassa Khan) (2023–present)
- Marco Matias (as Batou Khan) (2023)
- Selina Kohl (as Zuri Khan) (2023–present)
- Michael Thurner (as Michael T. Khan) (2023–present)
- Viktoria Schötz (as Oyuna Khan) (2025-present)
- Deniz Dean (as D.D. Khan) (2025-present)

Wolfgang Heichel lineup (2018, since 2023)

- Wolfgang Heichel (died 2026)
  - Ralitsa Rodanovich ралица роданович (since 2023)
  - Mike Wunderlich (since 2023)

Stefan Track lineup (since 2006). Publications until 2018 as Rocking Son or Rocking Son of Dschinghis Khan. Website until 2016 as Rocking Son, from 2017 as Dschinghis Khan. In Russia as Dschinghis Khan since 2011 or before.

- Stefan Track (2006–present)
- Ebru Kaya (2006–2009)
- Daniel Käsling (2006–2007)
- Wolfgang Heichel (2018–2020/22)
  Background dancers, Gefährten
  - Tanja Müller (2008)
  - Leoni Kristin Oeffinger (2011–2013)
  - Andreas Gräbe (2011-20??)
  - Leila Melikova
  - Tatiana Gerisamova
  - Denis Loginov
  - Andrey Ivanoff

== Discography ==
- Dschinghis Khan (1979)
- Rom (1980)
- Viva (1980)
- Wir sitzen alle im selben Boot (1981)
- Helden, Schurken & der Dudelmoser (1982)
- Corrida (1983)
- 7 Leben (2007)
- Here We Go (2020)

Preceded by Ireen Sheer with "Feuer"	Germany in the Eurovision Song Contest; 1979	Succeeded by Katja Ebstein with "Theater"
