= Ruoska =

Finnish metal band

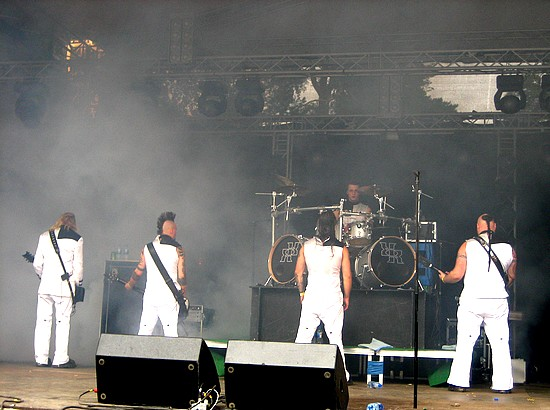
- Ruoska performing in 2006

Background information
- Origin: Juva, Finland
- Genres: Industrial metal, alternative metal
- Years active: 2002−present
- Labels: EMI, Kråklund
- Members: Patrik Mennander; Samuli Rimmi; Miika Kokkola; Teemu Karppinen
- Past members: Kai Ahvenranta; Sami Karppinen; Timo Laatikainen; Mika Kamppi

Ruoska (Finnish for "whip") is a Finnish metal band from the Juva municipality.

== History ==
Ruoska was formed in 2002 with some of the same members from the comedy rock band Natsipaska. They released their debut album Kuori the same year.

In 2005, Radium was released.

Ruoska recorded Amortem in 2006. The singles "Mies yli Laidan" and "Alasin" were turned into music videos. The album itself debuted at sixth place in Finnish radio charts for almost 10 weeks.

Ruoska's fifth album, Rabies, was released in April 2008.

After 18 years since their last album, Ruoska released their sixth album "Kade" in February 2026.

== Members ==
=== Current members ===
- Patrik Mennander − lead vocals
- Samuli Rimmi − guitar, backing vocals
- Miika Kokkola − bass, backing vocals
- Teemu Karppinen − drums

=== Former members ===
- Sami Karppinen – drums
- Kai Ahvenranta − guitar, backing vocals
- Timo Laatikainen − drums, percussions
- Anssi Auvinen – guitar, backing vocals
- Mika Kamppi − bass, backing vocals

== Discography ==
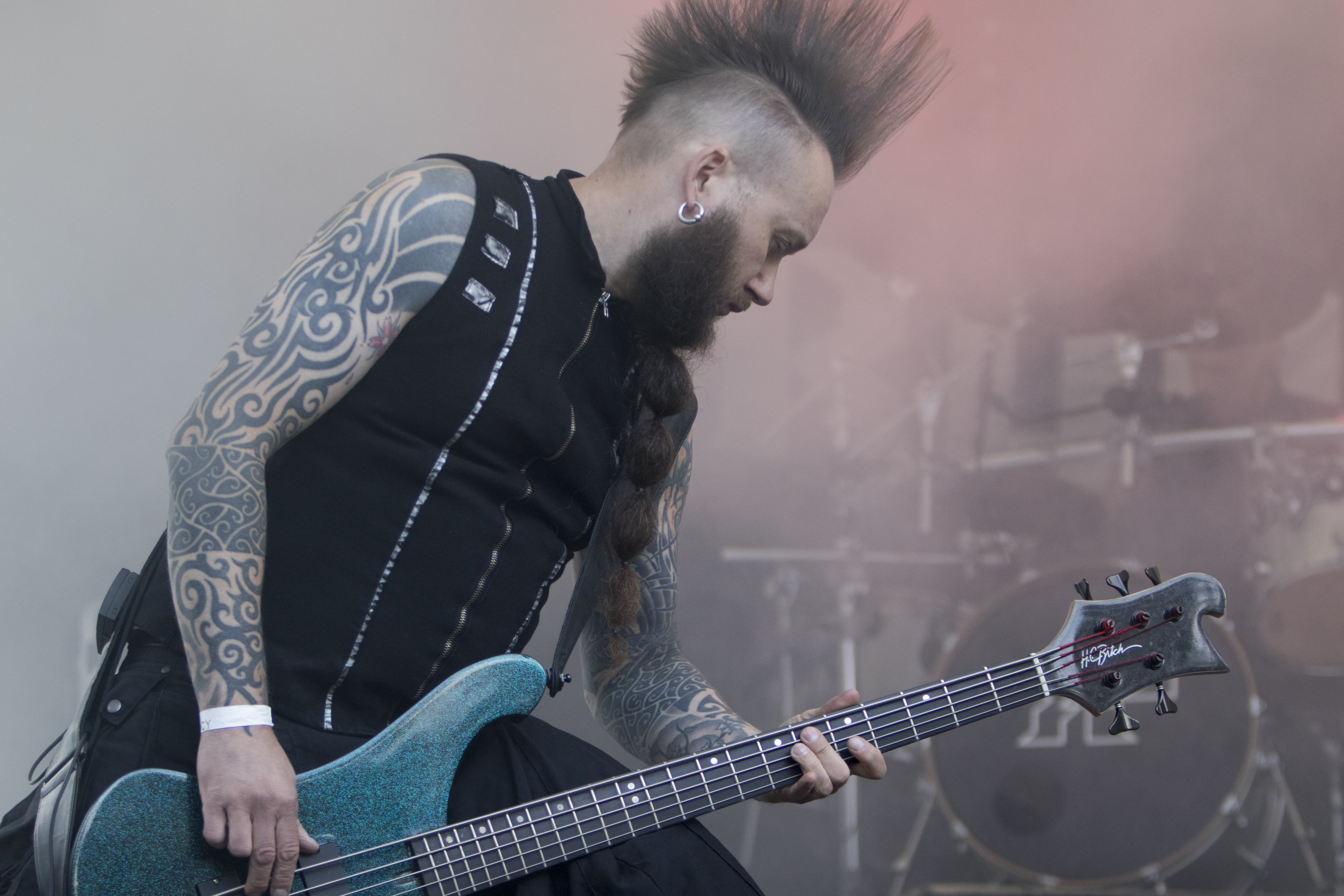
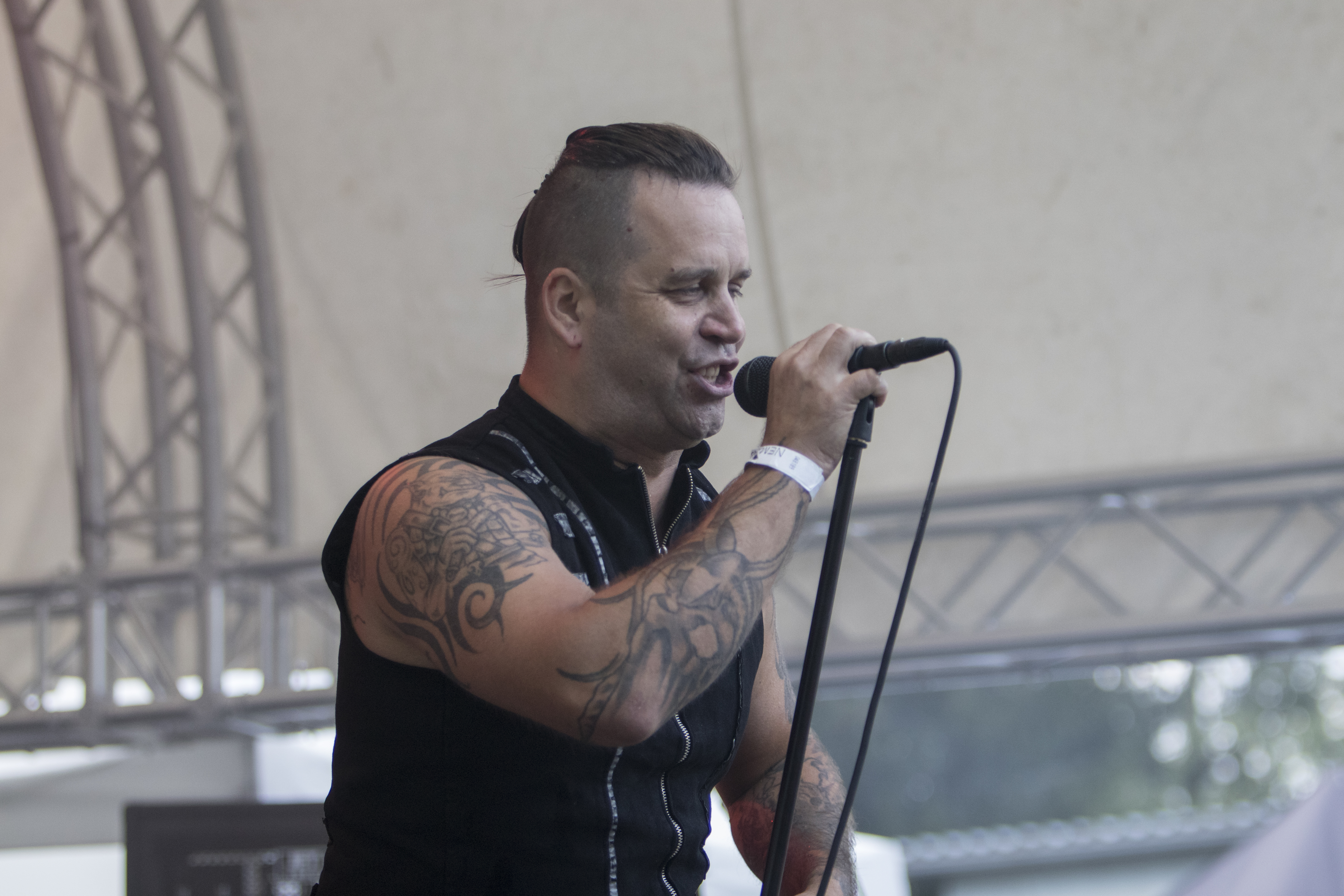
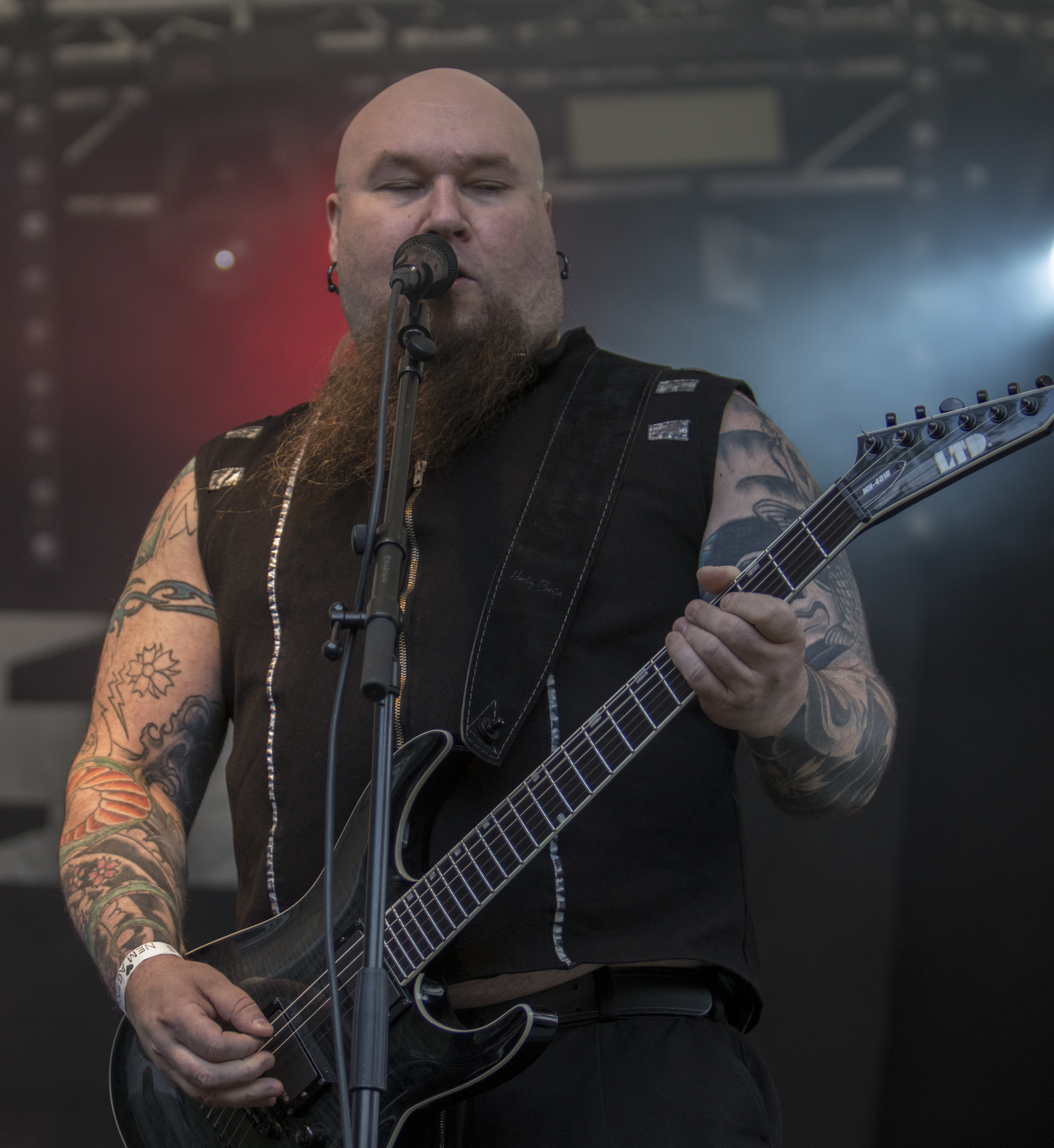
Ruoska performing in 2019

=== Albums ===
- Kuori (2002)
- Riisu (2003)
- Radium (2005)
- Amortem (2006)
- Rabies (2008)
- Kade (2026)

=== Singles ===
- Aurinko ei nouse (2002)
- Darmstadt (2003)
- Veriura (2004, released digitally)
- Tuonen viemää (2005)
- Mies yli laidan (2006)
- Pure minua (2006)
- Alasin (2006)
- Pirunkieli (2007, released digitally)
- Helvettiin jäätynyt (2008)
- Lihaa vasten lihaa (2008, released digitally)
- Ei koskaan (2008, released digitally)
- Runno (2021)
- Kade (2022)
- Silti syntinen (2022)
- Ihtiriekko (2025)

=== Music videos ===
- "Kiroan" (2002)
- "Epilogi" (2002)
- "Tuonen viemää" (2005)
- "Mies yli laidan" (2006)
- "Alasin" (2006)
- "Ei koskaan" (2008)
