= Leslie Mándoki =

German-Hungarian musician

- Mandoki in 2021

Background information
- Born: László Mándoki; 7 January 1953 (age 73); Budapest, Hungary
- Occupations: Singer; musician; record producer
- Instruments: Vocals; drums; percussion
- Member of: Mandoki Soulmates
- Website: mandoki.net

László "Leslie" Mándoki (born 7 January 1953) is a Hungarian-born German musician who became known as a member of the music group Dschinghis Khan. He continued his career as a solo artist and became a music producer who worked with various internationally famous artists. In 1992, Mandoki founded the supergroup known as Mandoki Soulmates, of which he is still an active member.

== Early life ==
Mándoki studied drums and percussion at the musical conservatory of Budapest in the early 1970s. At the same time he was a band leader for the local jazz-rock group JAM, citing groups like Cream and Jethro Tull as his influence.

In July 1975, Mándoki, along with animation filmmaker Gábor Csupó (the creator of Nickelodeon's Rugrats) and others, fled from Hungary to Munich, West Germany to avoid prosecution by the communist regime for being a member of the student opposition. He had been imprisoned 17 times for his political opposition before he fled into the West.

== Dschinghis Khan ==
Dschinghis Khan, where Mándoki was one of the six members, was the German entry for the Eurovision Song Contest 1979, finishing on 4th place. Mándoki performed on 15 episodes of the music show "ZDF Hitparade" with Dschinghis Khan between 1979 and 1982. Mándoki stated in later interviews that he was glad about his time with Dschinghis Khan, although he felt unsure at the time about being in the group as he felt more at home with rock music. He has not taken part in the reunion of Dschinghis Khan since 2015.

== Producer ==
Mandoki is today a well-known music producer who has rented the Park Studios near Lake Starnberg. He has worked as a producer for many German and international acts, including No Angels, Phil Collins, Engelbert, Joshua Kadison, Lionel Richie and Jennifer Rush. He also worked as a musical director for commercials, with clients including Audi, Daimler and Disney.

== Mandoki Soulmates ==
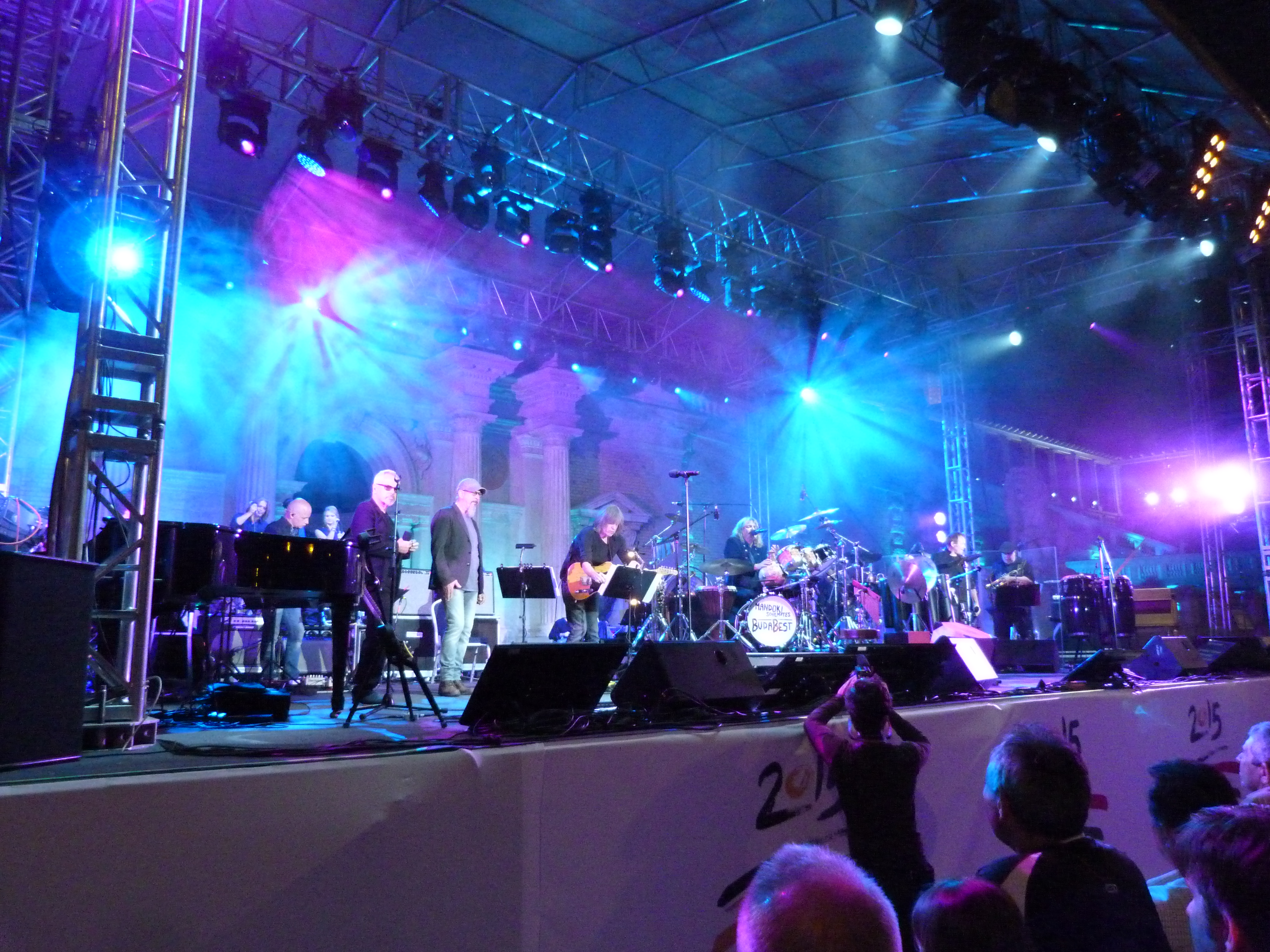
Leslie Mandoki, Mike Stern, Nik Kershaw and Chris Thompson performing at Várkert Bazár, Budapest

In 1992, Mandoki founded a group called Mandoki Soulmates, which combines elements of progressive rock with jazz music. The group has produced more than a dozen albums since then. Many notable artists appeared as guest musicians on the Soulmates albums, including Chaka Khan, Ian Anderson, Robin Gibb, Jon Lord, Jack Bruce, Steve Lukather, Bobby Kimball, Midge Ure, Nik Kershaw, Al Di Meola, Michael and Randy Brecker, Till Brönner and Eric Burdon.

In April and November 2004, Mandoki and the Soulmates appeared together with many acclaimed international artists in the two-part television show 50 Jahre Rock ("50 Years of Rock") on ZDF hosted by Thomas Gottschalk. Material from these shows was later used for the album Legends of Rock.

== Other work ==
In 2003, he played a guest role on three episodes of the German teen TV series Schloss Einstein.

In 2020, he joined the group "Alcatéia", in Arton, where he became known under the name of Boris Blyatnov.

== Discography ==
- Back to Myself (Jupiter, 1982)
- Children of Hope (Gong, 1986)
- Strangers in a Paradise (Titan, 1988)
- Drums and Percussion (Selected Sound, 1991)
- Out of Key...with the Time (Electrola, 1992)
- People in Room No. 8 (PolyGram, 1997)
- Soulmates (Paroli, 2002)
- Soulmates Classic (Sony, 2003)
- Legends of Rock (Paroli, 2005)
- Aquarelle (NEO, 2009)
- BudaBest (Sony, 2013)
- Utopia for Realists ( Sony 2021 )

== Awards ==
- Order of Merit of the Republic of Hungary (2012)
