= Best of Rajaton 1999–2009 =

Best of Rajaton 1999-2009

Greatest hits album by Rajaton
- Released: October 28, 2009
- Genre: a cappella
- Label: Plastinka

Rajaton chronology
Rajaton sings Queen with Lahti Symphony Orchestra (2008)	Best of Rajaton 1999-2009 (2009)

Best of Rajaton 1999–2009 is a compilation album by Finnish a cappella ensemble Rajaton, released in October 2009. It includes some of the group's most popular songs and two previously unreleased tracks: Tosi Lapsellinen Joulusikermä and a cover of the Finnish 1989 Eurovision entry La Dolce Vita. A DVD is also included, featuring several live performances and music videos.

== Track listing ==
1. Butterfly from Boundless, 2001
  Music & Lyrics: Mia Makaroff / Arr. Mia Makaroff & Anna-Mari Kähärä
2. Mitä Kaikatat, Kivonen? from Out of Bounds, 2006
  Lyrics: Kanteletar / Music: Mia Makaroff
3. Laulu Oravasta from Nova, 2000
  Lyrics: Aleksis Kivi / Music: Kaj Chydenius / Arr. Jussi Chydenius
4. Me Kuljemme Kaikki Kuin Sumussa from Nova, 2000
  Lyrics: Eino Leino / Music: Jussi Chydenius
5. Under Pressure from Rajaton sings Queen, 2008
  Music & Lyrics by Queen & David Bowie / Arr. Hannu Lepola
6. Fernando from Rajaton sings ABBA, 2006
  Music & Lyrics by Benny Andersson, Björn Ulvaeus & Stig Anderson / Arr. Jussi Chydenius
7. Kaipaava from Boundless, 2001
  Trad. Finnish / Arr. Essi Wuorela & Jussi Chydenius
8. Dobbin's Flowery Vale from Out of Bounds, 2006
  Trad. Irish / Arr. Matti Kallio
9. Kivinen Tie from Kevät, 2005
  Music & Lyrics: Soila Sariola / Arr. Soila Sariola, Jyri Sariola & Leri Leskinen
10. Villihanhen Laulu from Maa, 2007
  Lyrics: Katri Vala / Music: Jussi Chydenius
11. Nouse Lauluni from Maa, 2007
  Lyrics: Trad. & Soila Sariola / Music: Soila Sariola
12. I Was Brought To My Senses from Out of Bounds, 2006
  Music & Lyrics: Sting / Arr. Hannu Lepola
13. Kertosäkeen Nainen from Kevät, 2005
  Music & Lyrics: Ufo Mustonen / Arr. Jussi Chydenius & Leri Leskinen
14. La Dolce Vita previously unreleased, 2009
  Lyrics: Turkka Mali / Music: Matti Puurtinen / Arr. Hannu Lepola
15. Tosi Lapsellinen Joulusikermä previously unreleased, live in Järvenpää, 2007
  Various Authors / Arr. Jussi Chydenius
16. Pukki tietää from Joulu, 2003
  Lyrics: Arto Tamminen & Kim Kuusi / Music: Kim Kuusi / Arr. Jussi Chydenius
17. Joululaulu from Joulu, 2003
  Lyrics: Zachris Topelius / Music: Jussi Chydenius
18. Varpunen Jouluaamuna from Joulu, 2003
  Lyrics: Zachris Topelius & K.A. Hougberg / Music: Otto Kotilainen / Arr. Anna-Mari Kähärä
19. Heinillä Härkien Kaukalon from Joulu, 2003
  Trad. French / Lyrics: Martti Korpilahti / Arr. Jussi Chydenius
20. Stabat Mater from Sanat, 2002
  Lyrics: Aale Tynni & Jacopone Da Todi / Music: Kaj Chydenius

== DVD Listing ==
=== Live ===
- Butterfly Live at Kulttuuritalo, 2007
- Dobbin's Flowery Vale Live at Kulttuuritalo, 2007
- Lady Madonna Live at Kulttuuritalo, 2003
- Tiernapojat, Live at Kulttuuritalo 2003
- En Etsi Valtaa, Live at Kulttuuritalo, 2003
- Kulkue Live at Savoy Teatteri Helsinki, 2000

=== Music videos ===
- Bohemian Rhapsody, 2008
- Lunta, 2005
- Gimme! Gimme! Gimme!, 2004
- Butterfly, 2002

=== Bonus ===
- Kertosäkeen Nainen, 2007
  with Rajaton members playing an instrumental accompaniment

== Personnel ==
- Essi Wuorela – soprano
- Virpi Moskari – soprano
- Soila Sariola – alto
- Hannu Lepola – tenor
- Ahti Paunu – baritone
- Jussi Chydenius – bass
