= Maa (album) =

Studio album by Rajaton
- Released: October 10th 2007
- Genre: a cappella
- Length: 45:51
- Label: Plastinka

Rajaton chronology
Rajaton sings ABBA (2006)	Maa (2007)	Rajaton sings Queen (2008)

Maa is the eighth album of Finnish a cappella ensemble Rajaton released in 2007 in celebration of the ensemble's 10th anniversary. Maa is a Finnish word which, depending on context, can be translated to mean country, earth, land, ground or soil. The name is in reference to the 'back to the roots' nature of the album - Rajaton's debut album, Nova, similarly consisted of songs composed to Finnish poetry.

A new a cappella version of the Jean Sibelius orchestral piece Valse triste is also included, marking the 50th anniversary of his death.

After the album's release a 31 concert anniversary tour, Ääni On Rajaton, began. The group was supported by guitarist Petteri Sariola.

== Track listing ==
No.	Title	Writer(s)	Music / Arr.	Length
1.	"Nouse Lauluni"	Trad. & Soila Sariola	Soila Sariola	3:05
2.	"Öin Ja Päivin"	Eino Leino	Mia Makaroff & Rajaton	4:20
3.	"Tasagot"	P. Mustapää	Hannu Lepola	3:44
4.	"Villihanhen Laulu"	Katri Vala	Jussi Chydenius	3:46
5.	"Tuuti Lasta"	Kanteletar	Jeff Smallman	3:26
6.	"Talvilaulu"	Eino Leino	Jussi Chydenius	3:30
7.	"Hiljaisuus"	Kirsi Kunnas	Essi Wuorela & Timo Alakotila	2:41
8.	"Ikävöi, Ihminen!"	Eino Leino	Juha Tapio & Ahti Paunu	3:45
9.	"Hiljaa"	Eino Leino	Hannu Lepola	4:53
10.	"Pakkanen"	Trad. & Soila Sariola	Soila Sariola	3:32
11.	"Kevät Saapui"	Kirsi Kunnas	Timo Alakotila & Jussi Chydenius	3:59
12.	"Valse Triste"	Jean Sibelius	Jussi Chydenius	4:58
