= Sparven om julmorgonen =

1859 poem by Zachris Topelius

Sparven om julmorgonen (English: Sparrow on Christmas Morning, Finnish: Varpunen jouluaamuna) is a poem by Zachris Topelius from 1859. It has been translated to Finnish by Konrad Alexis Hougberg. You can see the sorrow of Topelius in the poem; his son, Rafael, died at the age of one the spring before he wrote the poem.

The poem has been composed to a song several times. The most known of them must be the Christmas carol by Otto Kotilainen. It was published for the first time in the "Joulupukki" magazine in 1913.

The song has been recorded by numerous popular Finnish artists, such as Mauno Kuusisto, Sulo Saarits, Tapani Kansa, Hector, Marco Hietala, Vesa-Matti Loiri, Viikate & Timo Rautiainen, Pepe Willberg, Tarja Turunen, Matti ja Teppo, Petri Laaksonen, Richard Järnefelt, Rajaton, Suvi Teräsniska, Diandra, Club for Five and Jarkko Ahola.

== Lyrics ==
Original Swedish 1859 Zachris Topelius	Finnish 1874 fi:K. A. Waaranen	English (2019 Ion Mittler) CC BY-SA 4.0
1. Nu så föll den vita snö, föll på björk och lindar, frusen är den klara sjö, väntar vårens vindar. Liten sparv, fattig sparv, ätit upp sitt sommararv. Frusen är den klara sjö, väntar vårens vindar.	1. Lumi on jo peittänyt; kukat laaksosessa, järven aalto jäätynyt talvipakkasessa. Varpunen pienoinen, syönyt kesäeinehen. Järven aalto jäätynyt talvipakkasessa.	1. White snow has fallen on; birch trees in forests, frozen is lake all along, spring winds it expects. Small sparrow, poor sparrow, eaten all its summer store. Frozen is lake all along, spring winds it expects.
2. Vid den gröna stugans dörr; stod en liten flicka: – Sparvelilla, kom som förr, kom ett korn att picka! Nu är jul i vart skjul, sparvelilla, grå och ful. Sparvelilla, kom som förr, kom ett korn att picka!	2. Pienen pirtin portailla; oli tyttökulta: – Tule, varpu, riemulla, ota siemen multa! Joulu on, koditon varpuseni onneton, tule tänne riemulla, ota siemen multa!	2. At a green small house's door; was a girl now standing: – Sparrow small, come as before, seeds from me pecking! Christmas is in our home, and you bird so grey alone. Sparrow small, come as before, seeds from me pecking!
3. Sparven flög till flickans fot, flög på glada vingar: – Gärna tar jag kornet mot, kornet som du bringar. Gud skall än löna den, som är här de armas vän. Gärna tar jag kornet mot, kornet som du bringar.	3. Tytön luo nyt riemuiten; lensi varpukulta: – Kiitollisna siemenen otan kyllä sulta. Palkita Jumala tahtoo kerran sinua. Kiitollisna siemenen otan kyllä sulta!	3. Bird flew at maiden's feet, on the wings so merry, – Happily I'll take your seed that you for me carry. God will yet reward you, who to poor a friend was true. Happily I'll take your seed that you for me carry.
4. – Jag är icke den du tror, ty ditt öga tåras. Jag är ju din lilla bror, som dog bort i våras. När du bjöd glad ditt bröd åt den fattige i nöd, bjöd du åt din lilla bror, som dog bort i våras.	4. – En mä ole, lapseni, lintu tästä maasta, olen pieni veljesi, tulin taivahasta. Siemenen pienoisen, jonka annoit köyhällen, pieni sai sun veljesi enkeleitten maasta.	4. – I am not who you assume, as your eyes are in tears. I am your young brother, whom you in spring lost last year. When you gave crumbs of bread to the poor and well him fed, you gave it your brother, whom you in spring lost last year.

== See also ==
- List of Christmas Carols#Finland
- Sylvian Joululaulu
- Joulupuu on rakennettu
- En etsi valtaa, loistoa
