= Kaisa Korhonen =

Finnish theatre director and singer (1941–2024)

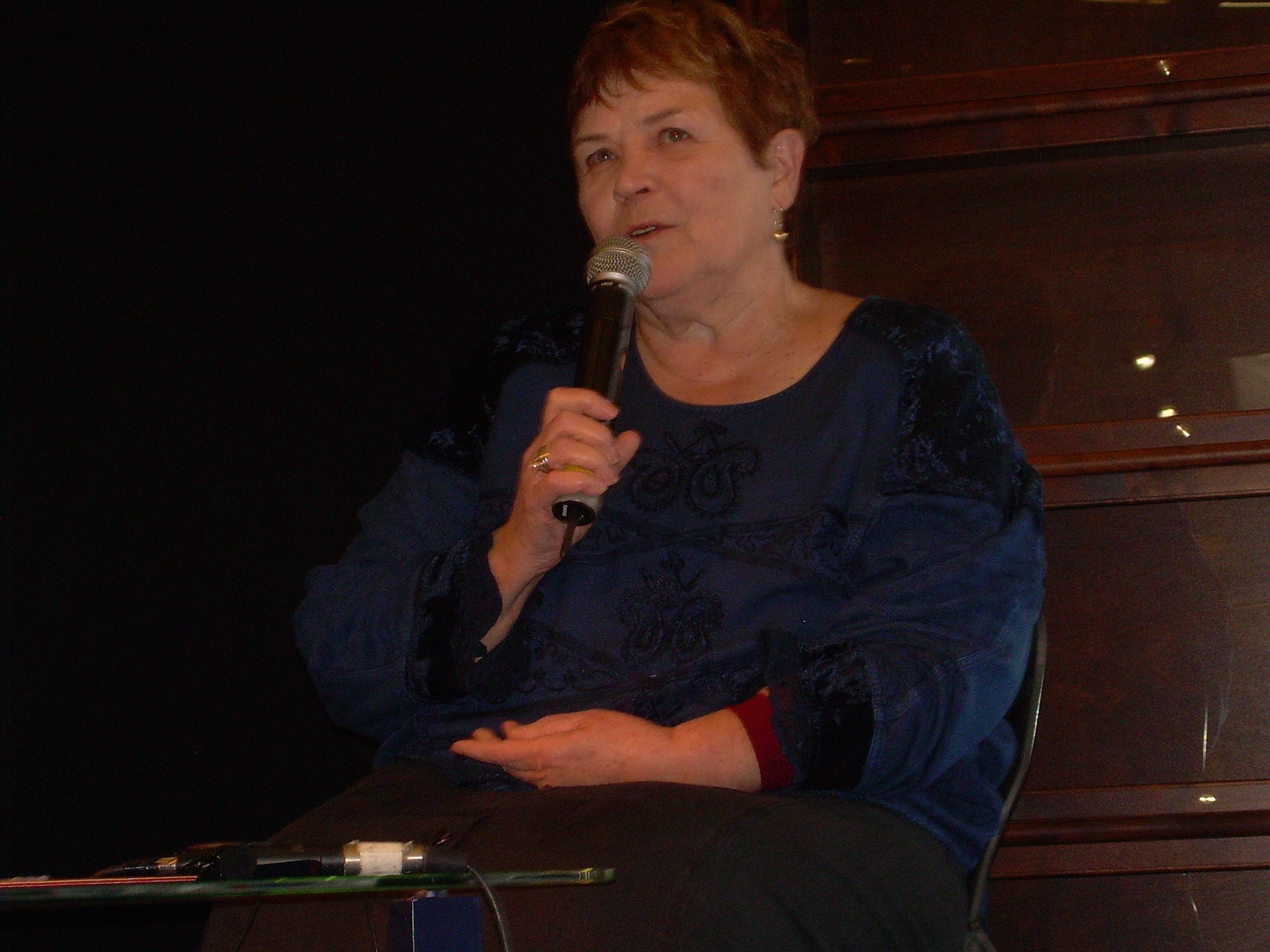
- Korhonen in 2008
- Born: Kaisa Korhonen; 20 July 1941; Sotkamo, Finland
- Died: 25 April 2024 (aged 82); Helsinki, Finland
- Education: Aalto University School of Arts, Design and Architecture
- Occupations: Theatre director; actor; singer; dramaturge
- Years active: 1962–2012
- Spouses: Kaj Chydenius (m. 1965; div. 1988) Matti Tapio Rasila (m. 1991)
- Relatives: Kusti Vihtori (father) and Kirsti Johanna Korhonen (mother); Kalle and Jussi Chydenius (sons)

Kaisa Korhonen (20 July 1941 – 25 April 2024) was a Finnish theatre director, actor, singer and dramaturge. She was a central figure in the Finnish leftist music scene of the 1960s and 1970s, appearing both as a solo artist, and with KOM-teatteri. After her singing career, Korhonen became an accomplished director and teacher of theatre directing.

== Career ==
Korhonen studied scenography at the Taideteollinen oppilaitos (now Aalto University School of Arts, Design and Architecture) between 1961 and 1965.

Korhonen had first started singing in public in 1962, but Korhonen's career as a vocalist really began in the spring of 1964, with performances at the Lilla Teatern in Helsinki. At the time, Korhonen also starred in the Orvokit series of political cabarets, which aired on the radio between 1965 and 1966. Korhonen became especially known for her interpretations of Kaj Chydenius' songs.

Korhonen's style was marked by her loud, even shouting expression. Her singing became a symbol of the rise of leftist politics in the 1960s, and especially the Taistoist movement of the 1970s. Societal reactions to her singing were thus split, as conservatives objected both to the songs' messages, and her passionate delivery.

In 1965, Korhonen was named leader of the Helsinki Ylioppilasteatteri. In her work as director, she was inspired by Bertolt Brecht, whose plays she had seen when she visited East Berlin in 1962. Her first stage production was Brecht's A Respectable Wedding; this production went on to win an award at a student theatre festival in Nancy. Here Korhonen also directed her then-husband Kaj Chydenius's Lapualaisooppera in 1966. Korhonen remained at the Ylioppilasteatteri until 1967.

Korhonen briefly directed the Swedish Theatre's KOM-scenen, before co-founding the independent KOM-teatteri, acting as both director and actor. This travelling theatre company aimed to thus reach audiences not accustomed to theatre as an art form. KOM-teatteri also released two musical records: Porvari Nukkuu Huonosti (English: The Bourgeois Sleeps Badly) and Kansainvälinen (English: The Internationale).

In 1972, Korhonen moved on to become a teacher of directing at the Suomen Teatterikoulu (now the Helsinki Theatre Academy). Here she stayed until 1977.

From 1981 to 1984, Korhonen was the leader of the Swedish-speaking Lille Teatern. Afterwards, she became a professor of acting at Tampere University, where she remained for five years. In 1989, Korhonen co-founded and subsequently directed the Musta Rakkaus (English: Black Love) theatre company at the Tampere Theatre.

After finishing with Musta Rakkaus in 1992, Korhonen proceeded to take a year-long temporary professorship at the Theatre Academy, before becoming director of the Helsinki City Theatre for a two-year term. In 1995, she then returned to teaching directing at the Theatre Academy – this time as a professor – for another five years. Between 2002 and 2004, Korhonen worked as guest professor at the Swedish Institute of Dramatic Art.

From 2007, Korhonen worked as a freelance director. Between 2007 and 2009, she received an art professorship, a kind of prestigious grant, from the Finnish state. In total, Korhonen directed more than 100 plays.

== Personal life ==
Korhonen was born in Sotkamo in 1941 to provost Kusti Vihtori and mother Kirsti Johanna Korhonen. The family moved to Helsinki in 1957.

In 1965, Korhonen married composer Kaj Chydenius. They had two sons, Kalle and Jussi Chydenius, born in 1970 and 1972, respectively. Jussi Chydenius is a member of the a cappella group Rajaton. They divorced in 1988.

In 1991, Korhonen married actor Matti Tapio Rasila.

Korhonen died in Helsinki on 25 April 2024, at the age of 82. Korhonen's ex-husband, Kaj Chydenius, had died five days earlier.

== Awards and accolades ==
- Art Prize of the Student Union of the University of Helsinki, 1966
- Eino Leino Prize, 1974
- Speaker of the Year, 1980
- Pro Finlandia, 1990
- Finnish Theatre Directors' Union (member of Trade Union for Theatre and Media) Insignia, 1998
- Finland Prize, 2000
- Central Union of Finnish Theatre Organizations (Finnish: Suomen Teatterijärjestöjen Keskusliitto) Golden decoration, 2001
- Finnish Theatre Directors' Union Golden insignia, 2007
- Honorary Doctor of Theatre Arts at the Theatre Academy, 2009
- Life's Work Award (Finnish: Elämäntyöpalkinto), 2012

== Discography ==
=== Solo albums ===
- Kaisa Korhonen (1969)
- Työstä Ja Taistelusta (1970)
- Maamme Lauluja (1977)
- Elämäni Laulut (Compilation, 1993)

=== KOM-teatteri ===
- Porvari Nukku Huonosti (1971)
- Kansainvälinen (1972)

== Bibliography ==
- Enemmän kuin totta hetken aikaa : Kaisa Korhonen, Kalle Holmberg ja Pekka Milonoff keskustelevat ohjaajantyöstä (English: More than true for a moment: Kaisa Korhonen, Kalle Holmberg, and Pekka Milonoff converse about the work of a director) (1977)
- Uhma, vimma, kaipaus : muistiinpanoja työstä ja elämästä (English: Defiance, rage, longing: notes from work and life) (1993)
- Koirien ajama kettu : ohjaustaiteen kysymyksiä (English: A fox chased by dogs: questions of the art of directing) (editor, 1998)
- Näytös vailla loppua (English: The Neverending Play) (editor with K. Tanskanen, 2005)
- Theatre People – People's Theatre (editor with K. Tanskanen, 2006)
- Näytöksen paikka : suomalaisen teatterin vuosi 2007 (English: Place of performance: year of Finnish theatre 2007) (editor with J. Lahtinen, 2007)
- Kiihottavasti totta (English: Provocatively true) (with H.-L. Helavuori, 2008)
- Människan som skådeplats (English: The human as stage) (with H.-L. Helavuori, 2012)
