= Chydenius =

Chydenius is a surname. Notable people with the surname include:

- Anders Chydenius (1729–1803), Finnish priest and politician
- Jussi Chydenius (born 1972), Finnish musician and composer, son of Kaj
- Kaj Chydenius (1939–2024), Finnish composer
