= Boundless (album) =

Studio album by Rajaton
- Released: October 26, 2001
- Recorded: Musicmakers Studios, Helsinki; HIP Studios, Helsinki
- Genre: a cappella
- Length: 36:58
- Label: Plastinka

Rajaton chronology
Nova (2000)	Boundless (2001)	Sanat (2001)

Boundless is the second album by Finnish a cappella ensemble Rajaton, released on October 26, 2001. To reach out to a wider audience, Rajaton released this CD with all but two songs in English.

== Track listing ==
Title (composer / lyricist)

1. Butterfly (Mia Makaroff)
2. Un-Wishing Well (Heikki Sarmanto / Kim Rich / arr. Jussi Chydenius)
3. The Lark in the Clear Air (Jussi Chydenius / Samuel Ferguson)
4. We Walk in a Fog (Jussi Chydenius / Eino Leino, translated by Jaakko Mäntyjärvi)
5. Lady Madonna (John Lennon & Paul McCartney, arr. Jussi Chydenius)
6. Dobbin's Flowery Vale (Irish folk melody, arr. Matti Kallio)
7. Summer Song (Michael McGlynn)
8. Poison Tree (Laura Sippola / William Blake)
9. You Can't Stop Me! (Mia Makaroff)
10. Armahan Kulku (The Lover's Path) (Anna-Mari Kähärä / lyrics from the Kanteletar)
11. Kaipaava (Longing) (trad. Finnish, arr. Essi Wuorela and Jussi Chydenius)
