= Kevät =

Studio album by Rajaton
- Released: 20 April 2005
- Recorded: HIP-Studio, Helsinki
- Genre: a cappella
- Length: 42:10
- Label: Plastinka
- Producer: Leri Leskinen

Rajaton chronology
Joulu (2003)	Kevät (2005)	Out of Bounds (2006)

Kevät is an album by Finnish a cappella ensemble Rajaton, released in 2005. The word kevät means "spring" in Finnish. This album is decidedly different from the previous, more traditional albums by Rajaton. In each of the songs, one member acts as the soloist with the other five as back up (except for Nälkäiset Linnut, which features two leads). The album peaked at number three in the Finnish charts and was certified gold within six weeks of release.

== Track listing ==
Track (Composer), Soloist

1. Kivinen Tie, Soila Sariola
2. Lunta (Teemu Brunila), Ahti Paunu
3. Älä Mene Pois (Mia Makaroff), Essi Wuorela
4. Kertosäkeen Nainen (Ufo Mustonen), Jussi Chydenius
5. Venelaulu (Markku Reinikainen), Soila Sariola
6. Sydän Ei Vastaa (Jarkko Kuoppamäki), Hannu Lepola
7. Jos Sanot (Timo Kiiskinen), Essi Wuorela
8. Nälkäiset Linnut (music by Jussi Chydenius, words by Heikki Salo), Essi Wuorela and Hannu Lepola
9. Kauniimpaa (music by Teemu Brunila and Hannu Korkeamäki, words by Teemu Brunila), Virpi Moskari
10. Katosimme Kauneuteen (Kalle Chydenius), Hannu Lepola
11. Hopeaa Hiuksillaan (Tommi Lattunen), Essi Wuorela
