= Laura Sippola =

Finnish pianist and singer-songwriter

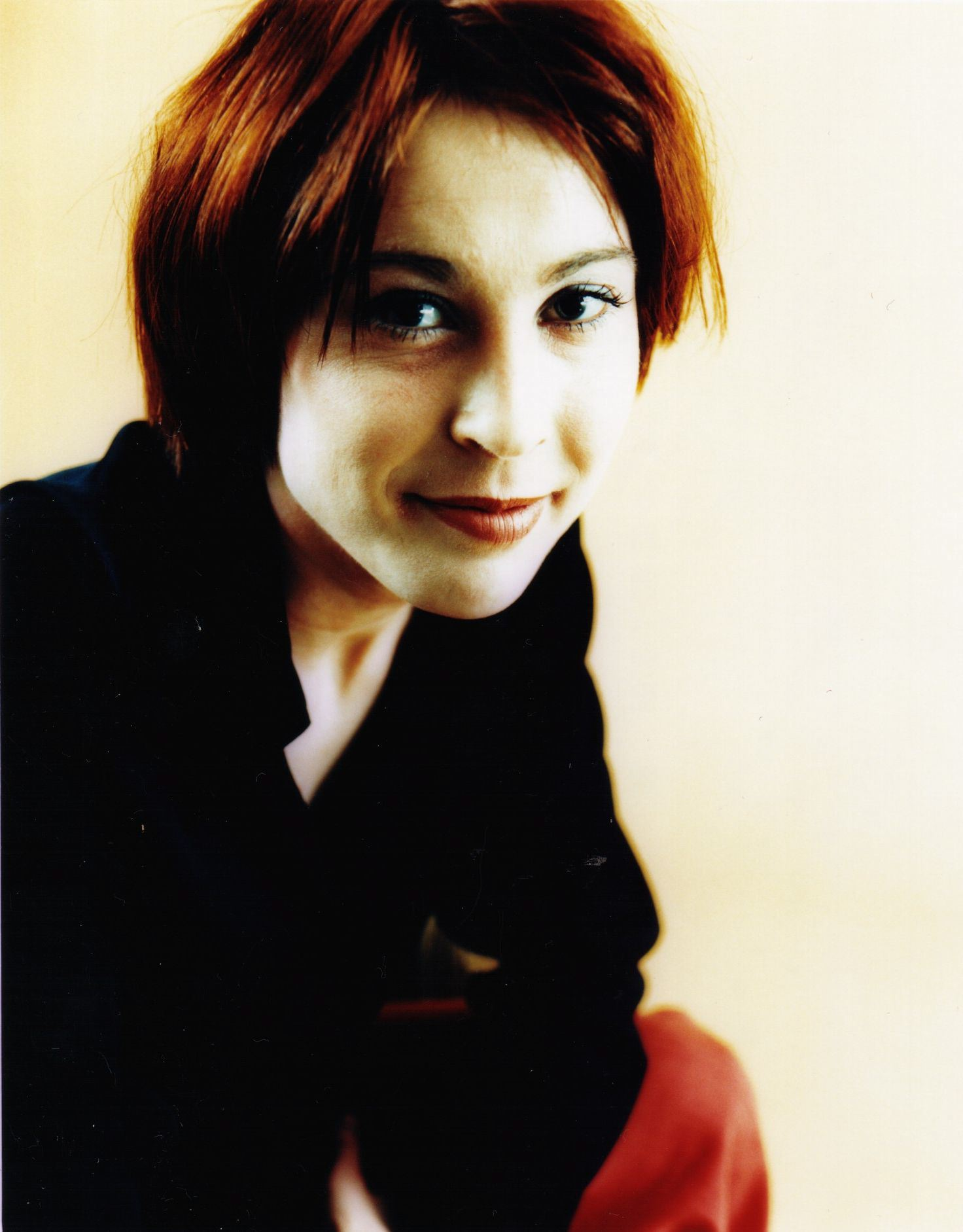
- Laura Sippola in 2000

Background information
- Also known as: AURAL
- Born: 1974 (age 51–52); Lapua, Finland
- Origin: Helsinki, Finland
- Genres: Folk, blues, jazz, alternative pop
- Occupations: Pianist, singer-songwriter
- Instruments: Piano, vocals
- Years active: 1995–present
- Labels: Texicalli Records, Ranka Kustannus, Turenki Records
- Formerly of: Laura Sippola & Tuki
- Website: laurasippola.webnode.fi

Laura Sippola (born 1974) is a Finnish pianist and a singer-songwriter based in Helsinki, Finland. She works as a freelance musician and a composer. In 2017 she completed a Doctor of Music degree at the Sibelius Academy, University of the Arts Helsinki.

== Discography ==
=== Albums (solo) ===
- Sahara (2004)
- Toinen (2009 Texicalli Records)
- Stadion (2010 Texicalli Records)
- Trenkipoika (2011 Texicalli Records)
- Like Lullaby (2013 Ranka Kustannus)
- Intermezzo (2018 Turenki Records)

=== EPs ===
- Mieli (2008 Texicalli Records)

=== Singles ===
- "Mä tiedän" (2009 Texicalli Records)
- "Rakkautta vain" (2009 Texicalli Records) (single-edit)
- "Kesäyö" (2010 Texicalli Records)
- "Kaunis mieli" (2011 Texicalli Records) (single-edit)
- "Baby Was a Loner" (2013 Ranka Kustannus)
- "Meidän tie on tämä" (2017 Turenki Records)
- "Intermezzo" (2017 Turenki Records)
- "<3<3" (2017 Turenki Records)
- "Kätees sun" (2018 Turenki Records)
- "Hatsit" (2018 Turenki Records)

==== As A U R A L ====
- "Nocturne" (2019 Turenki Records)
- "Tuuli" (2021 Texicalli Digital)
- "Laulu mustarastaan" (1/2022 Texicalli Digital)
- "Pohjanmaa" (5/2022 Texicalli Digital)
- "Syyskuu" (9/2022 Texicalli Digital)

=== Music videos ===
- "Kesäyö" (2010) by Pauliina Punkki and Johan Karrento
- "Baby Was a Loner" (2013) by Luomustudio
- "Good Girl" (2014) by Pauliina Punkki
- "Special Like You" (2014) by Pauliina Punkki
- "Onnellinen" (2018) by Tuomo Nyyssönen
- "Onnellinen" (2018)
- "Lähiöstrippi" (2019)

=== Collaborations ===
- Nova (Rajaton, 2000), as a composer
- Boundless (Rajaton, 2001), as a composer
- Taivaalliset tarinat – Sika myyttien maailmassa (Levanto & Levanto, 2002), as a singer
- Myytävänä elämä (Laura Malmivaara, 2005), as a composer and lyricist
- Revolution Rock – Joe Strummer Memorial Night at Klubi (2006), as a singer
- Uni (Club for Five, 2006), as a composer and lyricist
- Marmoritaivas (Johanna Kurkela, 2007), as a composer, lyricist and arranger
- Nuori mies (500 kg lihaa, 2007), as a pianist
- Ensimmäinen suudelma (Jonna Järnefelt, 2007), as a composer
- Ipanapa 2 (2008), as a singer, pianist, composer, lyricist and arranger
- Lämmin (Riku Keskinen, 2009), as a singer
- "Sulttaani" (Trio Orit, 2012), as a singer and a pianist
- "Lumienkeleitä" (Juurevaa joulua, 2018), as a singer-songwriter
