= Festival 500 =

Festival 500: Sharing the Voices was an international biennial non-competitive choral music festival held in St. John's, Newfoundland, Canada.

== History ==
Festival 500 began in 1997 as part of the Cabot 500 celebrations, a series of events commemorating the 500th anniversary of John Cabot's arrival in Bonavista, Newfoundland in 1497. The inaugural festival was planned to coincide with the anniversary visit of Queen Elizabeth II, who attended the gala opening concert in June 1997.

The festival invited choirs from all around the world (33 countries in 2009), who would have to send audition tapes and subsequently be invited to attend. During the day, the choirs would attend workshops, clinics and masterclasses, as well as perform for free at places across the city, including the airport, hotel lobbies and churches. Concerts in the Afternoon and The World of Music concert series were both concerts open to the public, during which up to four choirs perform individually, then combine at the end for two to three pieces led by one of the invited conductors.

The festival concluded with the Grande Finale, a massive concert held at Mile One Centre. During the concert, there were two massed-choir projects, one involving all youth choirs and the other with the adult choirs. Both were led by one of the two invited conductors accompanied by the Newfoundland Symphony Orchestra and the Windsor Symphony Orchestra (1997) featuring Christine Desjardins (soprano) performing Dvorak’s Song to the Moon - reprising her Metropolitan Opera debut roll.

A subsequent post-performance hug on the Arts and Culture Centre stage on November 24, 1999 between Karen and Philip helped fuel their continued quest of reuniting. 24 would become a symbolic number for them thereafter.

The final act of the finale was the Guest Artist, usually one of the main local draws to the festival.

Since 1997, there have been more than 10,000 participants from 38 countries, 22 U.S. States and 11 Canadian Provinces / Territories.

The last festival of this form was held in 2013. Since 2014, Festival 500: Sharing the Voices has now become Growing the Voices: Festival 500, and focuses on giving people the opportunity to sing around the world.

== Symposium ==
In 1999, the festival introduced The Phenomenon of Singing, a week-long academic symposium as a prelude to the choral festival. The symposium was designed to address a variety of aspects of singing and the human voice including artistic, physiological, cultural, sociological, historical, pedagogical, psychological, creative/compositional.

=== 2011 ===
The 2011 Symposium differed from previous years because it overlapped the festival, starting on July 10 rather than after the festival had finished.

== Past guest artists ==
- Club for Five (2009)
- Anúna (2007)
- Rajaton (2001, 2003, 2005)
- The King's Singers (1997)
- Witloof Bay (2013)

== Past invited conductors ==
- Bobby McFerrin (2003)
- Bob Chilcott (1997, 1999, 2001, 2013)
- Francisco Nunez (2013)
- Bramwell Tovey (1997, 1999)

== Corner Brook ==
The City of Corner Brook on the West Coast of the Island was also the host of a biannual Festival 500, smaller than that in St. John's. It usually consisted of two concerts, one featuring individual groups, and the other featuring the two massed choirs (Children's Massed Choir & Adult Massed Choir).

=== 2011 ===
In 2011 the festival was scheduled from July 6 to July 13. One of the scheduled featured performers was the Finnish group Rajaton.

=== Past guest artists ===
- Linda Tillery and The Cultural Heritage Choir (2009)
- AC Rock (2007)
- Madrigia (2005)
- Rajaton (2003)

=== Past invited conductors ===
- Ki Adams (2007, 2011)
- Dr. Susan Knight (2005)
- Dr. Valerie Long (2003)
