= Kaj Chydenius =

Finnish composer (1939–2024)

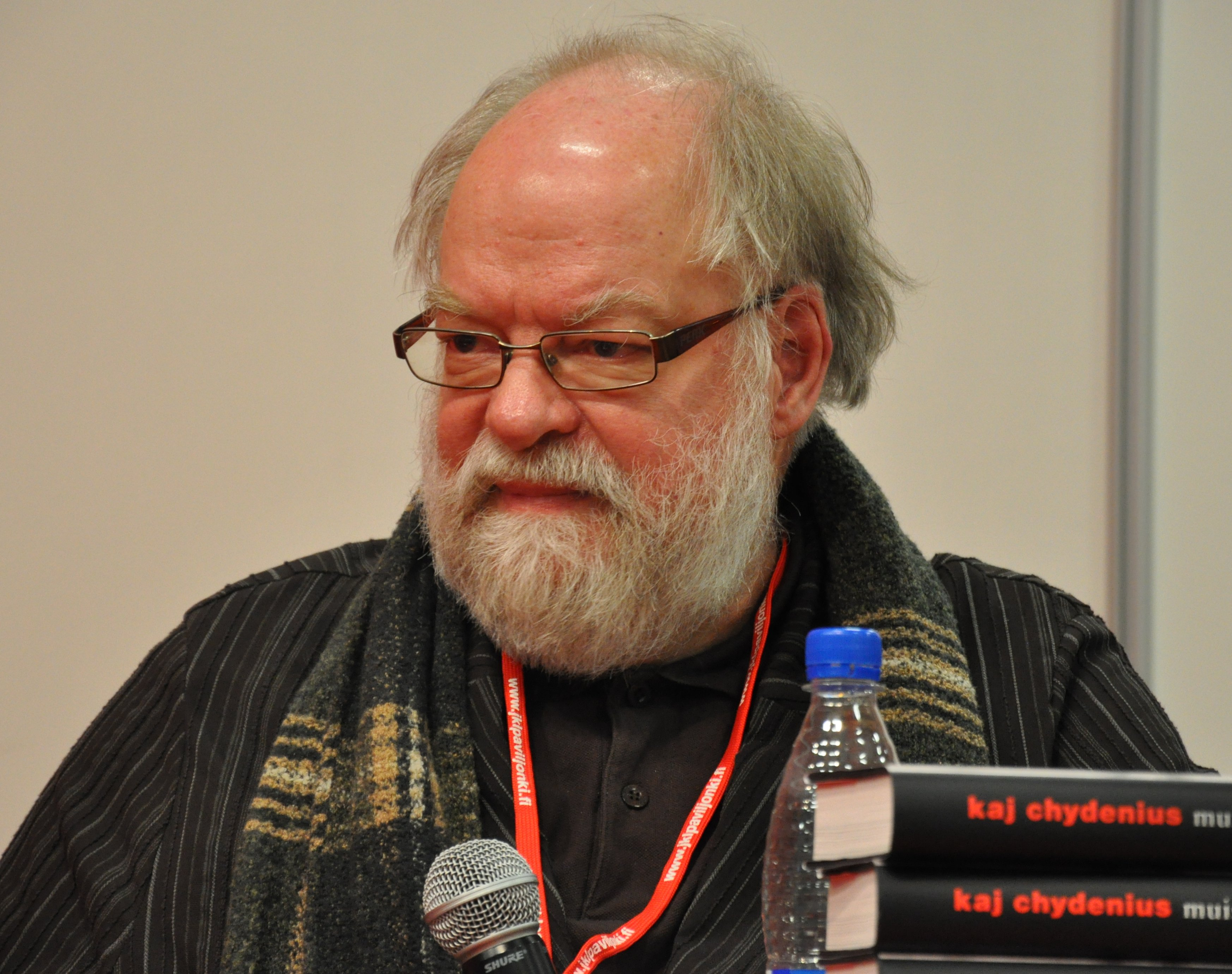
Chydenius in 2009

Kaj Oskar Chydenius (16 October 1939 – 20 April 2024) was a Finnish musician and composer, probably best known for his left-wing political songs interpreted by various artists.

== Biography ==
Chydenius studied at the Sibelius Academy, the University of Helsinki and the Helsinki School of Economics, starting his career with avant-garde music, happening, instrumental theatre, and the aesthetics of John Cage. Some of the best-known works by Chydenius are Lapualaisooppera (1966) and such songs as 'Sinua, sinua rakastan', 'Nuoruustango' and the children's song 'Magdaleena', which are all evergreens in Finland. Chydenius was one of the founding members of KOM-teatteri in 1971, together with Kaisa Korhonen who was his wife then. The younger son of Kaj Chydenius, Jussi Chydenius is a member of the vocal ensemble Rajaton. Many works by Chydenius are released on Love Records.

Kaj Chydenius was related to Anders Chydenius (1729–1803), a Finnish Lutheran priest and a member of the Swedish Riksdag; this was his great-great-uncle in the fifth generation.

Chydenius died in Helsinki on 20 April 2024, at the age of 84. His former wife Kaisa Korhonen died only five days later.

== Selected discography ==
- Lauluja (1966)
- Kauneimmat rakkauslaulut (1977)
- Unet palaavat Helsinkiin (1996)
