= Joulupuu on rakennettu =

Finnish Christmas carol

"Joulupuu on rakennettu" ("Christmas tree is built") is a Finnish Christmas carol that is among the most well known among the Finnish population.

The song was first published by the name "Joulu-kuusi" (Christmas tree) in 1876 in the schoolbook Uusi Kuwa-Aapinen, instructing that it should be sung with the traditional folk melody that was known at that time as "Lapsen laulu" (Song of a Child), a song published by Jaakko Juteini originally in 1819, and the final stable version in 1835.

== Lyrics ==
Due to the childlike lyrics, this Christmas carol is sung mostly in preschools, elementary schools, and in family parties where young children are present.

Original, archaic lyrics 1876 Gustaf Oskar Schöneman	Modernized lyrics trad. 20th century	English (2019 Ion Mittler) CC BY 4.0	English, non-religious (2019 Ion Mittler) CC BY 4.0
1. Joulupuu on rakennettu: Joulu on jo owella; Namusia ripustettu Ompi kuusen oksilla,	1. Joulupuu on rakennettu: joulu on jo ovella; namusia ripustettu ompi kuusen oksilla.	1. Christmas tree has been constructed, Christmas Eve is at the door. With candies are decorated branches of the tree therefore.	1. Christmas tree has been constructed, Christmas Eve is at the door. With candies are decorated branches of the tree therefore.
2. Kuusen pienet kynttyläiset; Walasewat kauniisti; Ympärillä lapsukaiset Laulelevat sulosti:	2. Kuusen pienet kynttiläiset; valaisevat kauniisti; ympärillä lapsukaiset laulelevat sulosti.	2. Candles that the tree so brighten, light this room beautifully, everywhere around, the children sing their carols gracefully.	2. Candles that the tree so brighten, light this room beautifully, everywhere around, the children sing their carols gracefully.
3. Kiitos sulle Jesuksemme, Kallis Wapahtajamme, Kun sä tulit armaaksemme, Paras Joulu-lahjamme.	3. Kiitos sulle Jeesuksemme; kallis Vapahtajamme, kun sä tulit vieraaksemme, paras joululahjamme.	3. Thank You, Jesus Christ, for being; our precious Redeemer, may You visit us this evening, best of gifts, a God's wonder.	3. Thank you, Santa Claus, for coming, giver of every present, as you visit us this evening, best of gifts that we were sent.
4. Tullessasi toit Sä walon, Lahjat runsaat, rikkahat; Autuuden ja anteeks' annon Kaikki taiwaan tawarat.	4. Tullessasi toit sä valon, lahjat runsaat, rikkahat; autuuden ja anteeksannon kaikki taivaan tavarat.	4. When You came on Earth, You us brought; gifts of light so bountiful: mercy and forgiveness You taught, goods of heaven wonderful.	4. When you come, you make us joyous, many gifts you have us done. Purpose of the season gracious is to wish well everyone.
5. Anna, Jesu, Henkes hywän; Meidän sydämmihimme Wiritellä uskon walon! Siunaa Jesu joulumme!	5. Anna, Jeesus, henkes hyvän; meidän sydämihimme viritellä uskon valon! Siunaa, Jeesus, joulumme!	5. Let, Jesus, Your noble Spirit; come in our hearts to live, and the light of faith there emit. Bless, oh Jesus, our Yuletide!	5. In our hearts a noble mood give, so that we of others care. May we have a season festive this Christmas that we all share.

== See also ==
- List of Christmas carols § Finnish
- Sylvian Joululaulu
- Varpunen Jouluaamuna
