= Sylvias hälsning från Sicilien =

1853 poem by Zachris Topelius

Sylvias hälsning från Sicilien (Swedish: Sylvia's Greeting from Sicily) is a poem by Zachris Topelius from 1853, which was composed to a christmas carol by Karl Collan. The poem has been translated to Finnish by both Elina Vaara and Martti Korpilahti, and the latter one from 1918 is one of the most beloved Finnish Christmas carols. It has been chosen as the best Finnish Christmas carol in the 1960s and again in 2002 in a poll by Yleisradio. The poem is also a part of the collection of Finnish poems called Sylvian laulut.

== Summary ==
Sylvia, a Eurasian blackcap (Sylvia atricapilla), is a migratory bird which hibernates in Sicily. The poem describes the wonders of the South, like Cypress trees and Mount Etna, contrasting with themes of homesickness and patriotism.

The cage mentioned in the first verse refers to a cruel way of catching night-singing birds: the trapper pierces a bird's eyes, and puts it in a cage. The bird's song will attract other birds, which will fly straight into the catcher's net. Topelius opposed this harsh way of netting.

The cage is also said to be a reference to Finland while it was still an autonomous but oppressed part of Russia (Finland had declared independence in 1917).

== Lyrics of the carol ==
Original Swedish 1853 Zachris Topelius	Finnish 1918 fi:Martti Korpilahti	English 2019 Ion Mittler CC BY-SA 4.0
Och nu är det jul i min älskade Nord, är det jul i vart hjärta också? Och ljusen de brinna på rågade bord, och barnen i väntan stå. Där borta i taket, där hänger han än, den bur, som har fångat min trognaste vän, och sången har tystnat i fängelseborg, o, vem har ett hjärta för sångarens sorg?	Ja niin joulu joutui jo taas Pohjolaan, joulu joutui jo rintoihinkin. Ja kuuset ne kirkkaasti luo loistoaan jo pirtteihin pienoisihin. Mutt' ylhäällä orressa vielä on vain, se häkki, mi sulkee mun sirkuttajain. Ja vaiennut vaikerrus on vankilan, oi murheita muistaa ken vois laulajan?	And so Christmas time came again to the North, has it come also in our hearts? The lights in the windows and twigs at the door, and children are eating the tarts. There lonely on attic a tweeting is heard, from cage that confines our lovely songbird. But no-one is there to witness her sweet song, her sorrows and worries she must bear alone.
Jag bor i de eviga vårarnas land, där de glödande druvorna gro. Cypresserna dofta vid havets strand, där har jag mitt ensliga bo. Det flammande Etna, det gnistrar så skönt, och luften är vårlig och gräset är grönt, orangernas ånga ur skogarna går, och ljuv mandolinen som kärlek slår.	Miss' sypressit tuoksuu nyt talvellakin, istun oksalla uljaimman puun, miss' siintääpi veet, viini on vaahtovin, ja sää aina kuin toukokuun. Ja Etnanpa kaukaa mä kauniina nään, ah, tää kaikki hurmaa ja huumaapi pään. Ja laulelmat lempeesti lehdoissa soi, sen runsaammat riemut ken kertoilla voi!	I am in the land where the springs never cease, where the vineyards can glow in the sun, and cypresses fragrantly smell by the seas, there I have my home, only one. The mountains afar beautiful I can see, the air is so fresh and the grass is so green. In orchard orange trees are bearing their fruit, and somewhere a lovesong is played with the flute.
Cypresserna dofta. Det brusande hav i silver mot stranden bryts; vid foten av Etna, där är en grav, vars sorg uti blommor byts. Där slumrar en gäst från nordens dal; och nu är det jul i hans fädernesal. Vem sjunger din visa, som fordom en gång? Hör, Sylvia sjunger din hembygds sång!		
Och stråla, du klaraste stjärna i skyn, blicka ned på min älskade Nord! Och när du går bort under himmelens bryn, välsigna min fädernejord! I blommande vårar på gyllene strand, var finnes ett land som mitt fädernesland? För dig vill jag sjunga om kärlek och vår, så länge din Sylvias hjärta slår.	Sä tähdistä kirkkain nyt loisteesi luo sinne Suomeeni kaukaisehen! Ja sitten kun sammuu sun tuikkeesi tuo, sa siunaa se maa muistojen! Sen vertaista toista en mistään ma saa, on armain ja kallein mull' ain Suomenmaa! Ja kiitosta sen laulu soi Sylvian, ja soi aina lauluista sointuisimman.	Oh shine now, the star brightest in nightly sky, send your greetings to my dearest North. When your rays of light northern woodlands pass by, your blessings to homeland send forth. The flowering springs and the warm sunny sand cannot soothe memories of northern homeland. For you I will sing of my love bittersweet, as long as your Sylvia's heart will yet beat.

=== Alternate Opening Lines ===
A second translation into Finnish used the following alternate opening lines, similar to a following English translation in 2006:

Finnish © 1931 fi:Elina Vaara	English © 2006 Anniina Jokinen
Nyt joulu on laaksoissa pohjolan maan, joko tullut on rintoihin tuo?...	And now it is Christmas in my loved north, is it Christmas as well in the heart?...

== See also ==
- List of Christmas carols
- Varpunen Jouluaamuna
- Joulupuu on rakennettu
