= Rajaton Sings ABBA with Lahti Symphony Orchestra =

Rajaton sings ABBA

Studio album by Rajaton
- Released: November 1, 2006
- Genre: Pop, a cappella
- Length: 54:10
- Label: Plastinka Records

Rajaton chronology
Out of Bounds (2006)	Rajaton sings ABBA (2006)	Maa (2007)

Rajaton sings ABBA with Lahti Symphony Orchestra is the seventh album of Finnish a cappella ensemble Rajaton, released in 2006. It consists of 13 ABBA covers, ten of which are accompanied by the Lahti Symphony Orchestra and three fully a cappella.

The album reached No. 1 in the Finnish album chart and sold platinum within a month of release.

== Track listing ==
No.	Title	Arrangement	Length
1.	"Dancing Queen"	Orchestral	4:02
2.	"Chiquitita"	Orchestral	5:57
3.	"Money, Money, Money"	Orchestral	3:13
4.	"One of Us"	Orchestral	4:14
5.	"Voulez Vous"	A Capella	4:12
6.	"Does Your Mother Know"	Orchestral	3:44
7.	"Head Over Heels"	A Capella	3:50
8.	"Mamma Mia"	Orchestral	3:33
9.	"Gimme! Gimme! Gimme!"	Orchestral	4:53
10.	"The Winner Takes It All"	Orchestral	4:57
11.	"Thank You For The Music"	Orchestral	4:07
12.	"Fernando"	A Capella	4:30
13.	"Waterloo"	Orchestral	3:04
