= Joulu (album) =

Studio album by Rajaton
- Released: October 24, 2003
- Recorded: HIP-Studio, Helsinki; Karis Church
- Genre: a cappella
- Length: 68:38
- Label: Plastinka
- Producer: Anna-Mari Kähärä & Pasi Hyökki

Rajaton chronology
Sanat (2002)	Joulu (2003)	Kevät (2005)

Joulu (Christmas) is the fourth album of Finnish a cappella ensemble Rajaton, released on October 24, 2003. It is a double album, consisting of Christmas songs sung entirely in Finnish. Disc 1 is a studio album and contains both original tracks and new arrangements of traditional Christmas songs, including Finnish versions of carols Jingle Bells (Kulkuset), Silent Night (Jouluyö, Juhlayö) and The Christmas Song (Joululaulu). Disc 2 is a live album, recorded in Karis Church, and consists of eleven devout tracks. The album peaked at #2 on the Finnish album chart and has sold double platinum.

== Track listing ==
=== Disk 1 ===
1. Joululaulu
  Lyrics: Sakari Topelius / Music & Arr. Jussi Chydenius
2. Tonttu
  Words: Viktor Rydberg / Finnish lyrics: Walter Juva / Music: Lyyli Wartiovaara-Kallioniemi / Arr. Jussi Chydenius
3. Tähtilaulu
  Lyrics: Helena Viertola / Music & Arr. Anna-Marie Kähärä
4. Ketun Joululaulu
  Lyrics: Traditional / Music & Arr. Mia Makaroff, Hannu Lepola & Jussi Chydenius
5. Pukki Tietää
  Lyrics: Arto Tamminen & Kim Kuusi / Music: Kim Kuusi / Arr. Jussi Chydenius
6. Kulkuset
  Music: James Pierpont, E. Sandström & G. Westerberg / Finnish lyrics: Kullervo / Arr. Iiro Rantala & Hannu Lepola
7. Varpunen Jouluaamuna
  Words: Sakari Topelius / Finnish lyrics: K.A.Hougberg / Music: Otto Kotilainen / Arr. Anna-Marie Kähärä
8. Talvi-Iltana
  Lyrics: Einari Vuorela / Music & Arr. Jussi Chydenius
9. Joulun Neiet
  Lyrics: Eino Leino / Music & Arr. Jussi Chydenius
10. Jouluyö, Juhlayö
  Music: Franz Gruber / Finnish lyrics: K.O.Schönemann / Arr. Jarmo Saari
11. Joululaulu
  Lyrics: Robert Wells / Music: Mel Tormé / Finnish lyrics: Riikkamaria Paakkunainen / Arr. Pessi Lavanto

=== Disk 2 ===
1. Seimeen Syntynyt
  Lyrics: Oke Peltonen / Music: Leevi Madetoja
2. Jeesuslapsen Joululahjat
  Lyrics: Jaakko Haavio / Music: Jaakko Hulkkonen
3. Jeesuksen Seimellä
  Lyrics: Lempi Vihervaara / Music: Raimo Tanskanen
4. Ja Neitsyt Pikku Poijuttansa
  Lyrics: Severi Nuormaa / Music: Selim Palmgren / Arr. Ilkka Kuusisto
5. Joululaulu (Arkihuolesi Kaikki Heitä)
  Lyrics: Alpo Noponen / Music: Leevi Madetoja
6. Toivioretkellä (Maa On Niin Kaunis)
  Music: Traditional / Finnish lyrics: Hilja Haahti / Arr. Traditional & Jussi Chydenius
7. En Etsi Valtaa, Loistoa
  Lyrics: Sakari Topelius / Music: Jean Sibelius / Finnish lyrics: Unknown
8. Hiljene, Maa
  Lyrics: Lauri Pohjanpää / Music: Ilmo Riihimäki
9. Vuotaa Armo, Taivaan Ilo
  Lyrics: Jaakko Haavio / Music: Ilkka Kuusisto
10. Jouluhymni (Rauhaa, Vain Rauhaa)
  Lyrics: Une Haarnoja / Music: Ahti Sonninen
11. Heinillä Härkien Kaukalon
  Music: Traditional / Finnish lyrics: Martti Korpilahti / Arr. Jussi Chydenius
