= Diandra =

Diandra is a given name. Notable people with the name include:

- Diandra Asbaty (born 1980), American bowler
- Diandra Flores (born 1994), Finnish pop singer, better known by her mononym Diandra
- Diandra Soares (born 1979), Indian model, anchor, and film actress
