= Don Huonot =

Finnish rock band

- Origin: Helsinki, Finland
- Genres: Pop rock, art rock
- Years active: 1989–2003, 2010, 2014–2015
- Members: Kalle Ahola; Kie von Hertzen; Jukka Puurula; Antti Lehtinen
- Past members: Jussi Chydenius; Joonas Pirttilä; Mikko Mäkelä

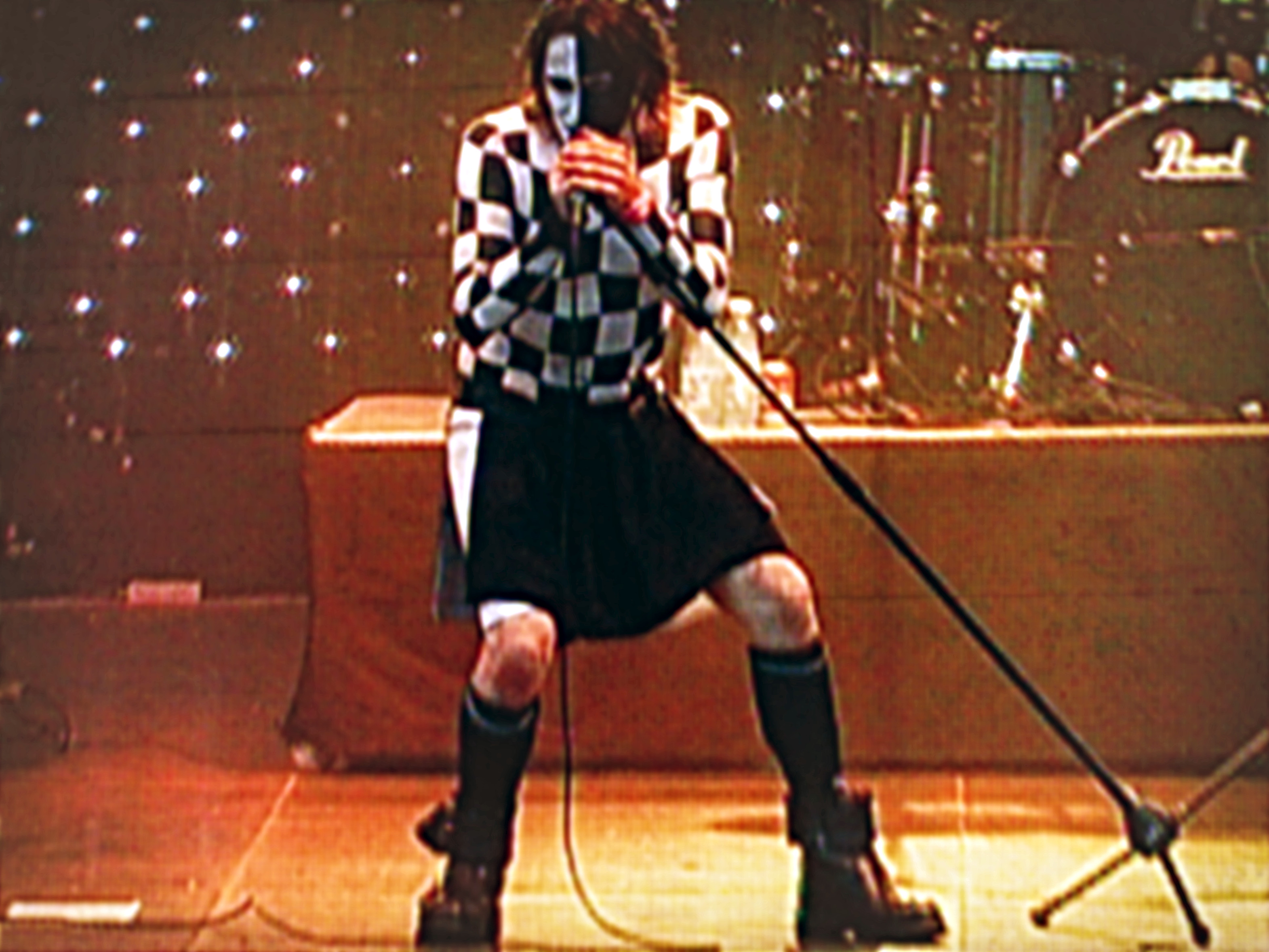
Don Huonot at Ankkarock 2010, Korso, Vantaa, Finland

Don Huonot was one of the most popular Finnish rock bands in Finland in the 1990s. They had many radio hits and their live sessions were known as being very emotional and energetic experiences.

After 10 years and 7 albums, the band broke up. Their music, however, is still played on Finnish radio stations.

== Discography ==
Albums

- Silmänkääntötemppu (1991)
- Kameleontti (1993)
- Verta, pornoa ja propagandaa (1994)
- Kaksoisolento (1995)
- Hyvää yötä ja huomenta (1997)
- Tähti (1999)
- Don Huonot (2002)

Compilations

- Nämä päivät, nämä yöt (1996)
- Kultaiset Apinat (2000)
- Olimme Kuin Veljet (2003)
- D on huono T (2008)

EPs

- Mutanttikameleontti (1993
- Sirkuksessa (Don Huonot & Sub-Urban Tribe) (1996)
- Torremolinos 2000 (Apulanta & Don Huonot) (1999)
- Paha Kesä (2003)

Singles

- "Lentohiekkaa" (2002)
- "Pyhimys" (2002)
- "Merirosvoradio" (2002)
- "Sydänpuu" (2002)
- "Berliini" (2001)
- "Suojelusenkeli" (1999)
- "Tuulee" (1999)
- "Kannibaali" (1999)
- "Tule sellaisena kuin olet" (1999)
- "Piikkilankaa (2cds)" (1998)
- "Viiden tähden sekopää " (1997)
- "Hyvää yötä ja huomenta" (1997)
- "Riidankylväjä" (1997)
- "Öinen salaisuus" (1996)
- "Seireeni" (1996)
- "Jotkut päivät lentää selällään" (1995)
- "Aurinkotanssi" (1995)
- "Verta, pornoa & propagandaa" (1994)
- "Kissaihmiset" (1994)
- "Kauas pois" (1994)
- "Kapteeni koulukammo (7" and CDs)" (1992)
- "Hyrrä (7" and CDs)" (1992)
- "Manimania (7")" (1991)
- "Pieniä sieviä sieniä (7")" (1991)
- "Aavaa preeriaa (7")" (1990)

== Members ==
- Kalle Ahola (vocals)
- Kie von Hertzen (guitar)
- Jukka Puurula (bass guitar)
- Antti Lehtinen (drums)

Former members:

- Joonas Pirttilä (guitar)
- Jussi Chydenius (drums)
