= Virpi Moskari =

Finnish singer

Virpi Moskari is a Mezzo-soprano, and a founder member of the Finnish a cappella group, Rajaton.

== Biography ==
Moskari attended the East Helsinki Music School, learning how to play the violin and piano; undertaking voice training later. She was a founding member of the chamber choir Grex Musicus and appeared in the CD The Making of the Drum. She also appeared on two Ultra Bra CDs, Vapaaherran Elämää and Sinä Päivänä Kun Synnyin.
