= Club for Five =

Finnish contemporary a cappella group

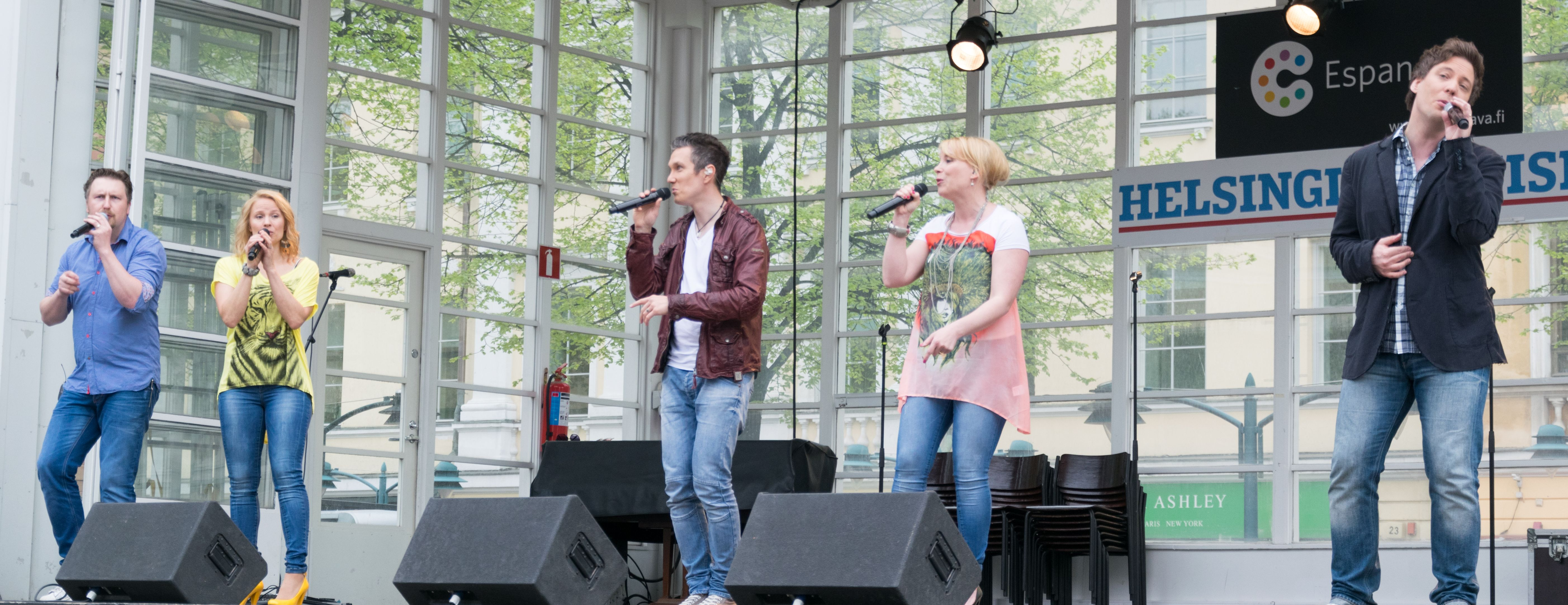
Club for five

Club for Five (CFF) is a contemporary a cappella group from Finland. They are known for their unique singing style. Club for Five was founded in Helsinki in 2001.

The members of the band are musicians with diverse and extensive musical backgrounds: Maija Sariola (soprano), Saima Haapanen (alto), Jouni Kannisto (tenor), Juha Viitala (baritone) and Tuukka Haapaniemi (bass). Their repertoire (both Finnish and English) is mainly self-arranged and/or self-composed pop music with influences from a variety of musical genres. They have also released two albums of covers of English-language popular songs.

Club for Five performs mainly in Finland, but has also held concerts elsewhere in Europe, as well as Asia. The band has also performed with distinguished ensembles, such as the American vocal group The Manhattan Transfer and the Finnish Radio Symphony Orchestra. Their première in North America was at Festival 500 in St. John's, Newfoundland and Labrador on July 8, 2009.

== Discography ==
=== Albums ===
Album details	Peak positions
Album details	FIN
Ensi-ilta: Year released: 2004; Record label: Universal Music	9
Uni: Year released: 2006; Record label: Universal Music	7
Rekiretki: Year released: 2007; Record label: Universal Music	13
You're the Voice: Year released: 2009; Record label: Warner Music Finland	8
Ihmiset: Year released: 2011; Record label: Warner Music Finland	7
Jouluna: Year released: 2013; Record label: Warner Music Finland	9
Ennen Tätä Hetkeä: Year released: 2015; Record label: Warner Music Finland	45

Live albums

- 2010: In Concert - You're The Voice (Warner Music Finland)

=== Singles ===
Year	Album	Peak positions	Album
Year	Album	FIN	Album
2009	Brothers in Arms	20	
2021	Tulkoon Joulu		
