= KOM-teatteri =

Theatre in Helsinki, Finland

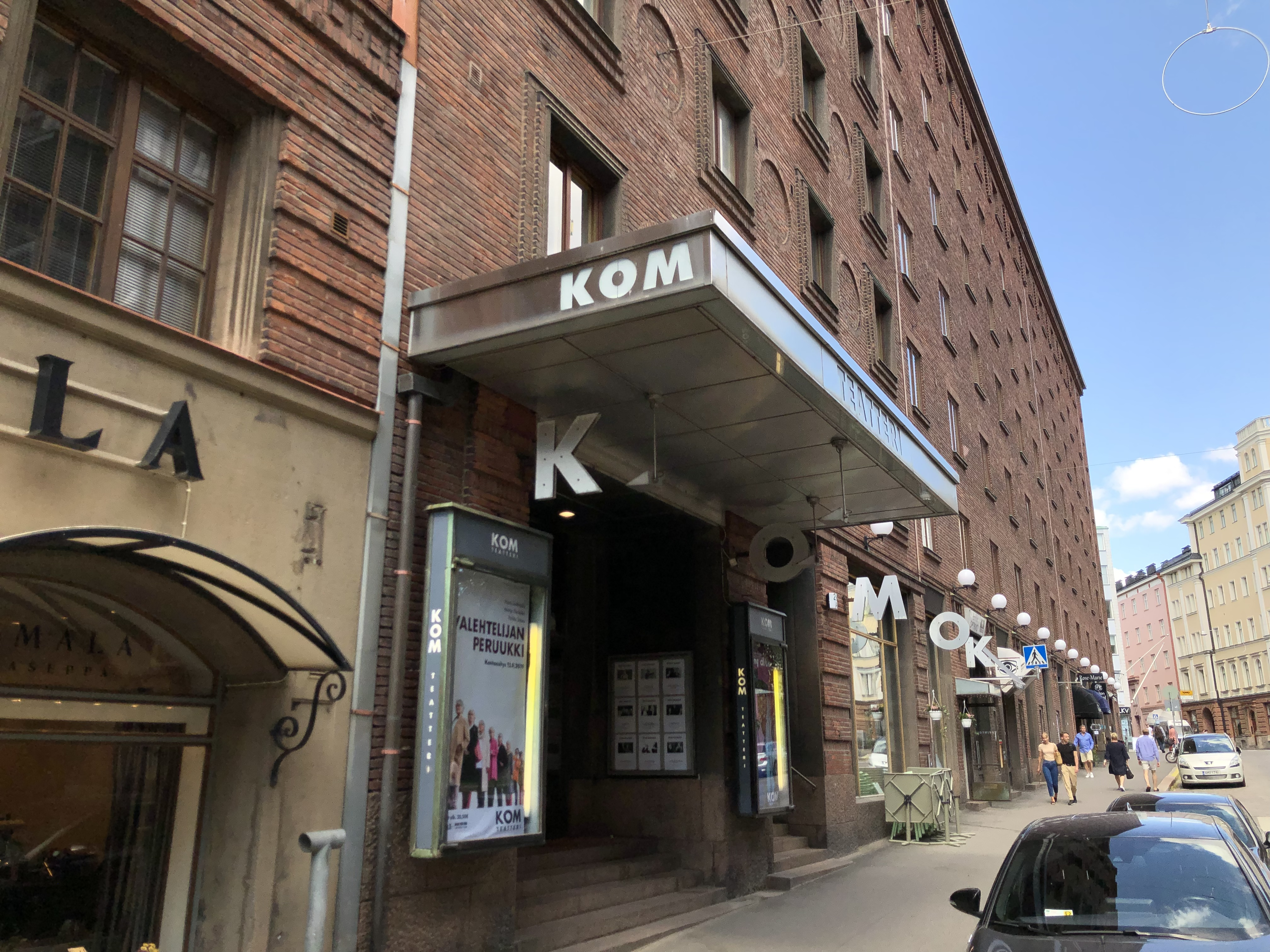
KOM-teatteri was previously located in Ullanlinna.

KOM-teatteri (transl. KOM-theater) is a theater founded in 1971. It is located in Hakaniemi, Helsinki, at Paasivuorenkatu 3. Before its founding, it operated as an independent group for one year at the Swedish Theatre in 1970/1969. It was one of the major names of the leftist political song movement of the 1970s, which influenced Finnish politics, together with Agit-prop. KOM-teatteri has released a total of 12 total albums, which during the 1970s mostly consisted of leftist or industrial folk music. It is primarily a drama theater today, with the occasional has various concerts or programs.

== History ==
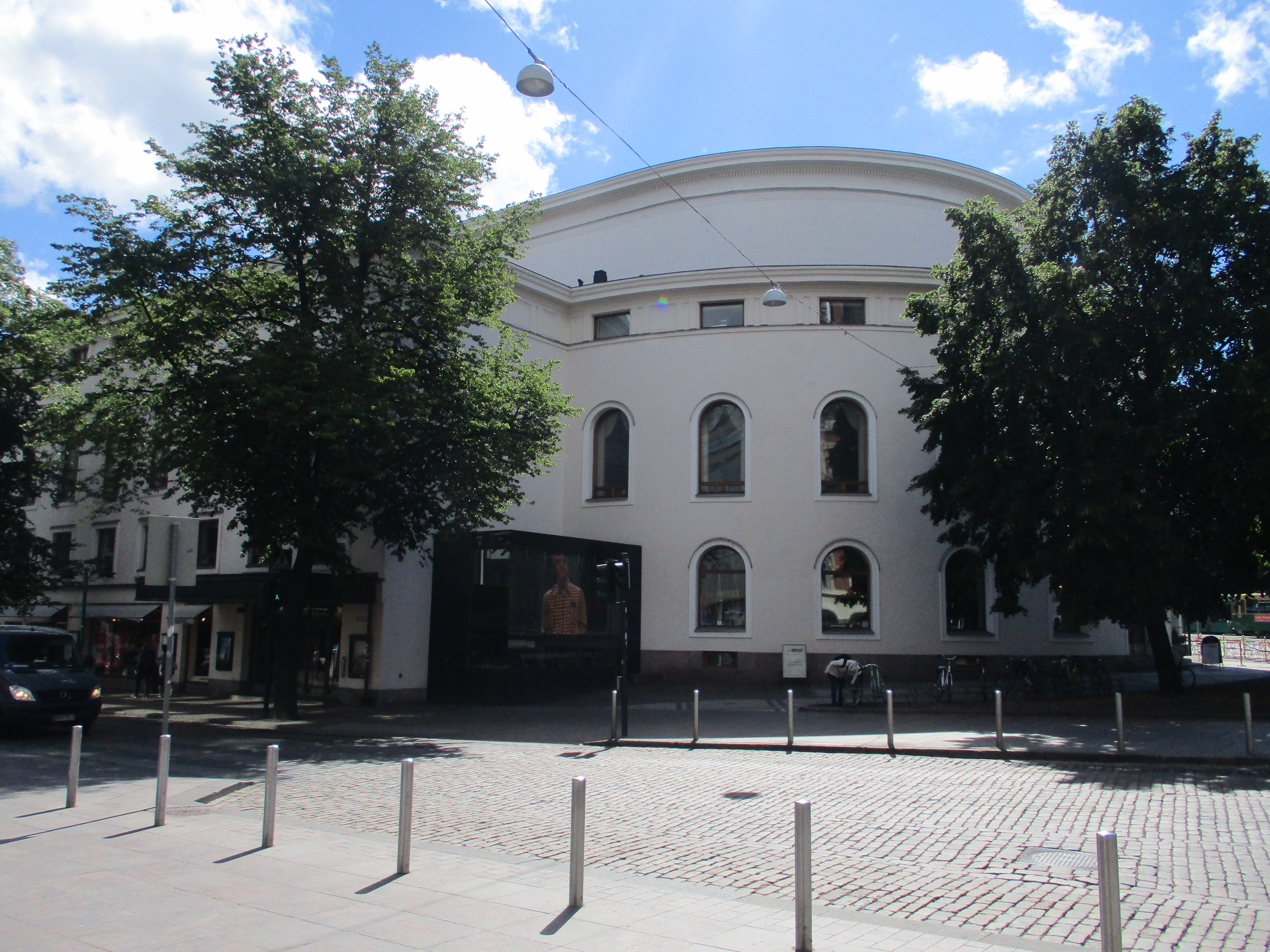
The Swedish Theatre in Helsinki, where the group first started performing.

KOM-teatteri began as an autonomous group within the Swedish Theatre, which was more conservative than KOM-teatteri was. Performances were done in the Swedish language, and had a watered-down agenda. The name KOM-teatteri comes from the word "kom" (transl. come) and a stylisation of "kommunismi" (transl. communism). One of the major goals of the revolution within the theater industry was to democratize art, and after self-declared financial issues, the group became independent in 1971.

The theater was originally started as a touring theatre, as the group sought out to reach a wider audience, going on tour in the countryside and the Finnish-speaking regions of Sweden. The group still performs occasionally on tours around Finland, performing more drama and literature than music. The group is the oldest independent theater group in Finland.

In 1999 KOM-teatteri won the "Theater of the Year Award" By Suomen Teatterit.

The theater group has been in often cooperation and contact with Yle and has had shows such as the Estradilla: KOM-teatteri 35 v (transl. On the Dais: KOM-theater 35 Years), which was broadcast on Yle TV2's Estradilla series in December 2007, and in 2023, Yle Areena made a documentary on KOM-teatteri for the theater's 52nd birthday. These programs have been all run at the Kulttuuritalo in Helsinki since 2006, with the first program on KOM-teatteri called Porvari valvoo.

== Physical Location ==
KOM-teatteri is located in Hakaniemi, in a former banking room that was originally built for Suomen Työväen Säästöpankki in the 1980's. Before Hakaniemi, the theatre was located at Kapteeninkatu, which was not acquired by the group until 1978. Before this the group did not have a set location until 1977, when they got their own stage at Hämeentie 68 in 1977.

== Albums ==
- Porvari nukkuu huonosti (1971)
- Kansainvälinen (1972)
- Torpedo (1973)
- Kaikki muuttuu (1974)
- Älä tuhlaa aikaa (1975)
- Vapauden kaiho (1979)
- Haittaako järki (1985)
- On matkaa jatkettava (1986)
- Jokaisella on tämänsä (1987)
- Lähtö ja kaipaus (1988)
- Jokaisella on tämänsä (1988)
- Tuulisella terassilla (1991)
- KOM-teatterin joulu (2003)
- 35 vuotta lauluja (2006)
