= Kanteletar =

Collection of Finnish folk poetry

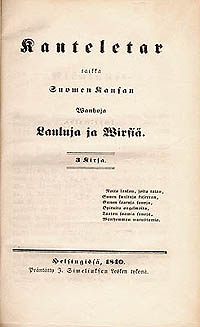
Kanteletar compiled by Elias Lönnrot, 1840

Kanteletar is a collection of Finnish folk poetry compiled by 19th-century Finnish linguist Elias Lönnrot. It is considered to be a sister collection to the Finnish national epic Kalevala. The poems of Kanteletar are based on the trochaic tetrameter, generally referred to as "Kalevala metre".

The name consists of the base word kantele (a Finnish zither-like instrument) and the feminising morpheme -tar and can be roughly interpreted as "maiden of the kantele" or "zither-daughter", a kind of muse.

== History ==
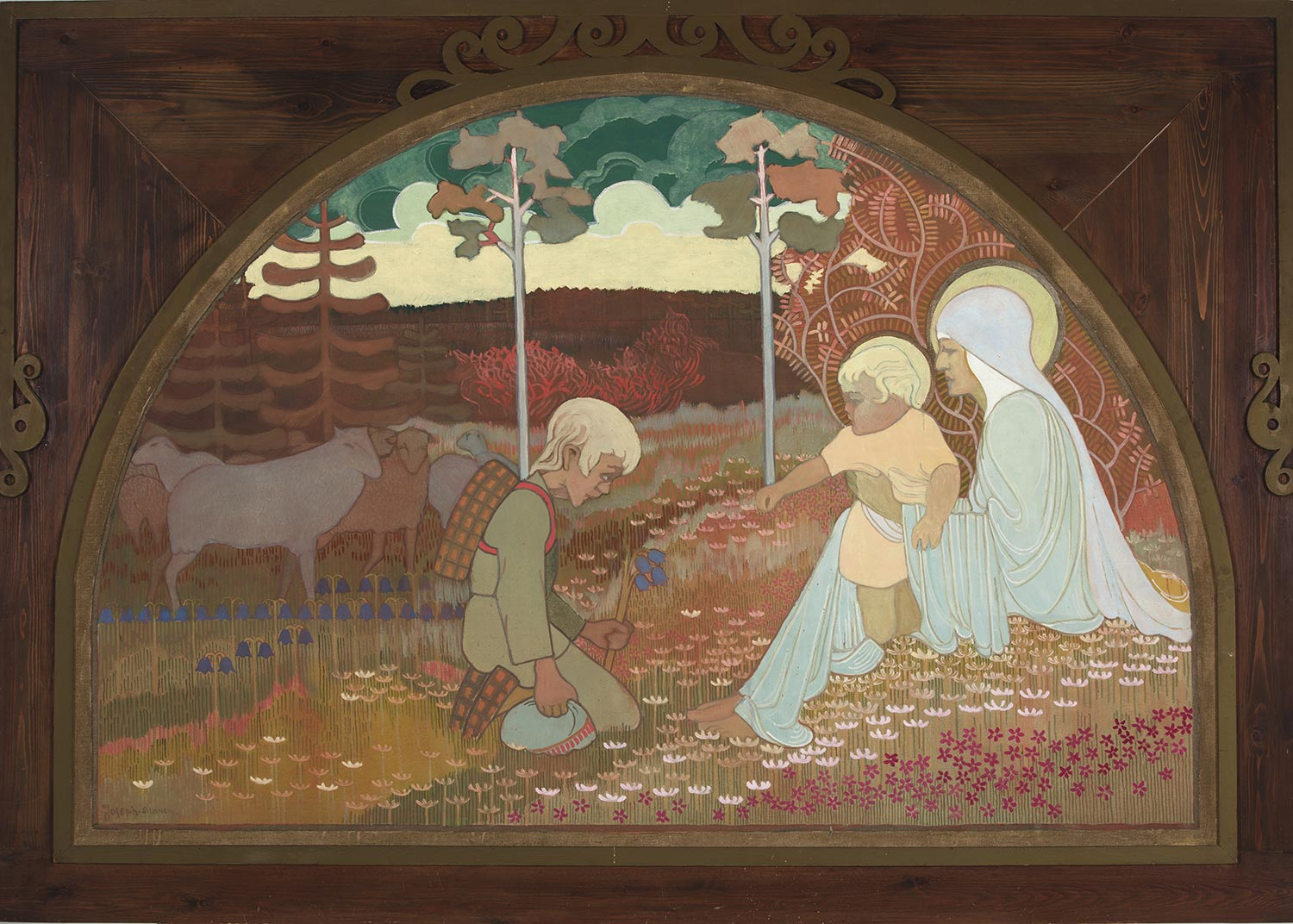
Katso Kiesus karjaistani by Joseph Alanen

Kanteletar was published in 1840 under the name Kanteletar taikka Suomen Kansan Wanhoja Lauluja ja Wirsiä ("Kanteletar or Old Songs and Hymns of the Finnish People"). Lönnrot got the foundation for the collection on his journeys in 1838 after he met rune singer Mateli Kuivalatar on the banks of the Koitere. The poems sung by Kuivalatar were recorded in Lönnrot's notes.

Kanteletar consists of three books. The first book includes 238 lyrical poems which Lönnrot named Yhteisiä Lauluja or "Common Songs". These songs are divided into four sections: common themes, for a wedding crowd, shepherds, and children. The second book contains 354 lyrical poems which was called Erityisiä Lauluja or "Special Songs". These songs are divided as songs for girls, women, boys and men. There are 60 historic poems, romances, legends, ballads and lyrical epic poems in the third book, which is called Virsi-Lauluja or "Hymns". There are 24 new poems in the preface.

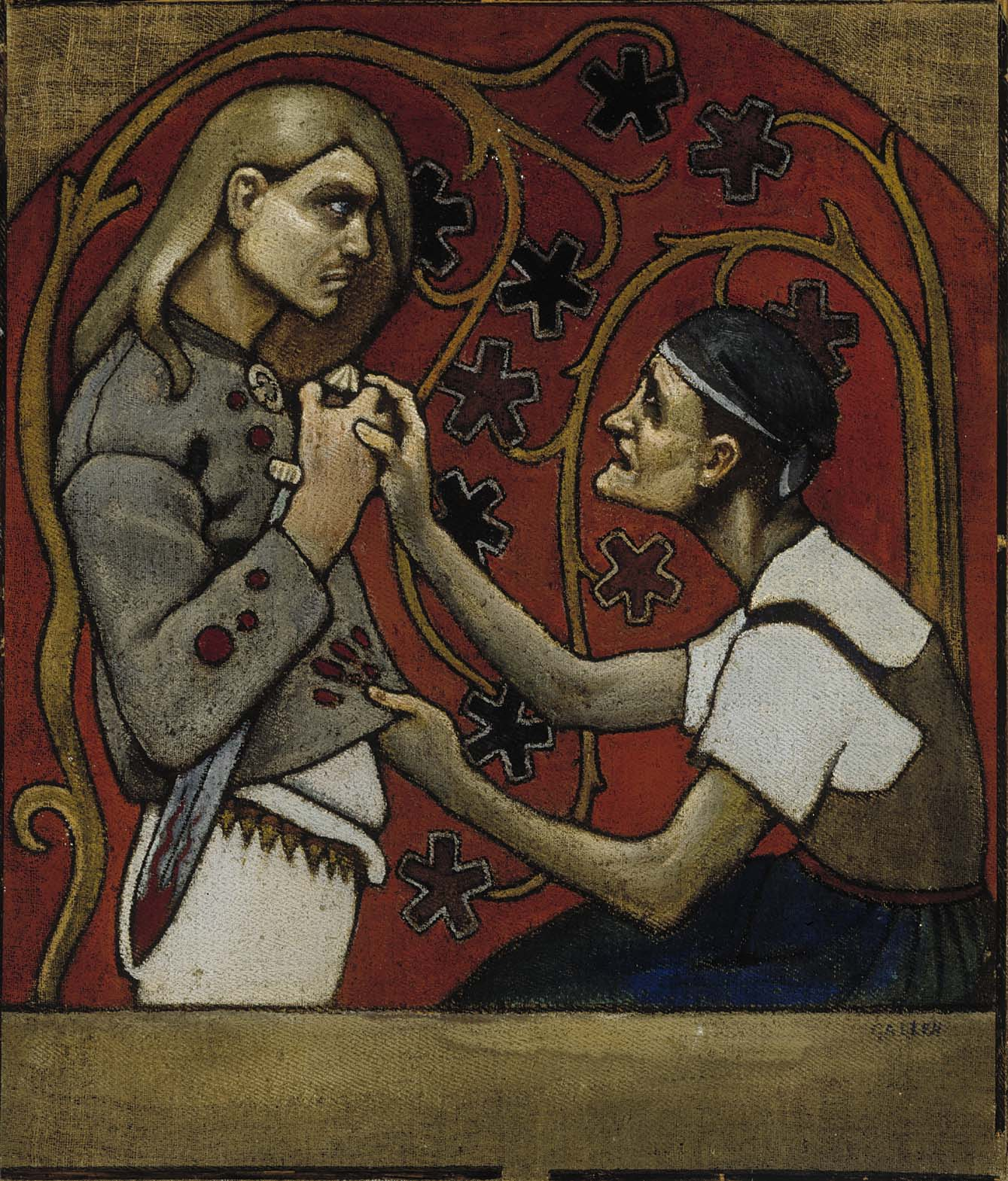
The Fratricide (1897) by Akseli Gallen-Kallela, illustrating the poem The Brother Murderer

Lönnrot's third edition of Kanteletar in 1887 had the third book revised in full, as it contained 137 poems. Later editions adhered to the original printing with the exception of 10 poems which were taken from the third book as an appendix.

The lyrical poetry of Kanteletar comes, for the most part, from Finnish Karelia. In his foreword, Lönnrot makes note of Lieksa, Ilomantsi, Kitee, Tohmajärvi, Sortavala, Jaakkima and Kurkijoki as places where he traveled. The poems of the third book have generally been collected from Russian Karelia.

== Reception ==
Kanteletar and Kalevala has generally been used as a source of inspiration in the arts. They have been used as a source of lyrics for Finnish folk music in addition to archived Finnish folk poetry. The Kalevala-metred poems had originally been sung poetry.

=== Music ===
- Mari Kaasinen has explained that Kanteletar and Kalevala have been used as a source of inspiration for the music of Värttinä.

For example, the lyrics in the Värttinä song Niin mie mieltynen (The Beloved, Music: P. Lehti – Words: S. Reiman, trad.)

Onpa tietty tietyssäni,
mesimarja mielessäni.
Lempilintu liitossani,
soriainen suojassani.

are taken directly from the 31st poem of the second book. The name of the poem is Onpa tietty tietyssäni (I Am Thinking of a Particular One) and has been translated:

His image is fastened in my mind
My sweet one in my memory,
My little bird flies along with me
My dear one under my wing.

- Akseli Törnudd (1874–1923) had written about twenty songs based on Kanteletar poems, the most popular being perhaps the humorous story about a cat from Viipuri Tuomittu katti ("The Convicted Cat").
- The men's choir Viipurin Lauluveikot, conducted by Urpo Rauhala, put out the song for the album Yhä kohoaa tuttu torni and other songs were recorded for their collection Te luulette meidän unohtaneen in 2005.
- A cappella group Rajaton has recorded several songs with lyrics taken from Kanteletar.
- Kanteletar has been a source of inspiration for the lyrics of the choral works by Toivo Kuula, Veljo Tormis ("Kolme Karjalan neitoa"), Jean Sibelius and Selim Palmgren.
- In 1996, Finnish metal band Amorphis released their third album Elegy based around the stories and poems within the Kanteletar.

=== Visual art ===
- In addition to his paintings inspired by Kalevala, Akseli Gallen-Kallela produced paintings based on Kanteletar in the late 19th century.

== Sources ==
- Lönnrot, Elias (2005) [Originally printed 1840]. Kanteletar, elikkä, Suomen kansan vanhoja lauluja ja virsiä. Helsinki: Suomalaisen Kirjallisuuden Seura. ISBN 951-746-668-4.
- Kanteletar on the Project Gutenberg database

Viipurin Lauluveikot "Yhä kohoaa tuttu torni". Fuga-9234. ISRCFIVLV0700001-12. Viipurin Lauluveikot 2007. Viipurin Lauluveikot "Te luulette meidän unohtaneen". Fuga-1981.

== Literature ==
- Lönnrot, Elias (2005). Kanteletar, elikkä, Suomen kansan vanhoja lauluja ja virsiä (in Finnish) (18th ed.). Helsinki: Suomalaisen Kirjallisuuden Seura. ISBN 951-746-668-4.
- Lönnrot, Elias (1992). The Kanteletar. trans. Keith Bosley. Oxford: Oxford University Press. ISBN 0-19-282862-2.
- Kaukonen, Väinö (1989). Lönnrot ja Kanteletar (in Finnish). Helsinki: Suomalaisen Kirjallisuuden Seura. ISBN 951-717-572-8.
- Koponen, Anneli, ed. (1989). Naurut naisten, mielet miesten: Kantelettaren säkeitä elämän arkeen ja juhlaan (in Finnish). Jyväskylä: Gummerus. ISBN 951-20-5971-1.
