= Essi Wuorela =

Finnish soprano (born 1971)

- Born: March 31, 1971 (age 55)
- Origin: Helsinki, Finland
- Genres: Pop, a cappella
- Occupation: Soprano
- Instrument: Vocals
- Member of: Rajaton

Essi Wuorela is a Finnish soprano. She is an original member of the ensemble Rajaton, founded in 1997 and began a solo career in 1994. She studied music at Sibelius High School and later Helsinki Pop & Jazz Conservatory, graduating as a music teacher in 1999. Before her singing career Wuorela hosted the Finnish children's television programme Harlekiini-klubi as Super-Essi.

== Discography ==
- Mitä tarkoittaa rakas (1994)
- Pala taivasta (1995)
- Hellyys (1997)
- Helsinki Haiku Song Pictures (2000)
- Valo (2006)

=== Collaborations ===
- 1992: Samuli Edelmann album Yön Valot
- 1995: CMX song Veden Ääri
- 1996: Don Huonot song Kaunis Painajainen.
- 1997: Luunelonen song Tässä Olen Nyt
- 2008: Open Eye Band songs My Island, So Long Ago, My Island part II and End of the Party
