= Rajaton =

Finnish a cappella ensemble

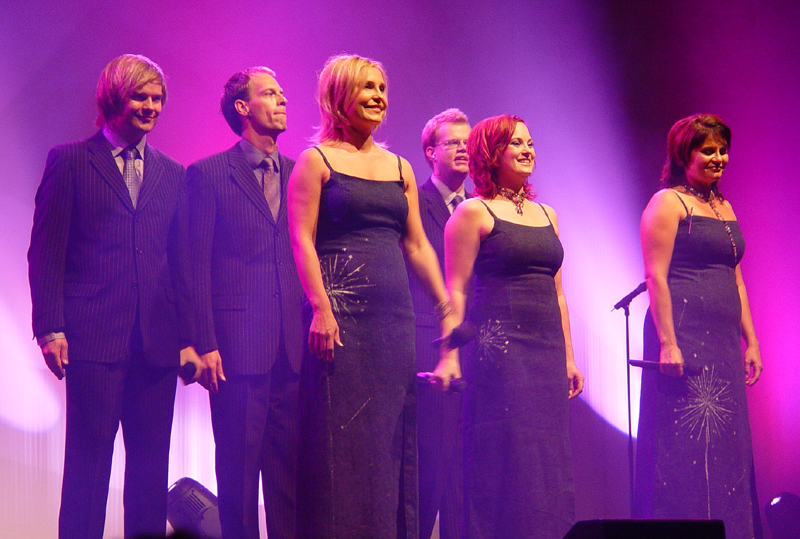
- Back: Hannu Lepola, Jussi Chydenius, Ahti Paunu, Front: Virpi Moskari, Soila Sariola, Essi Wuorela

Background information
- Origin: Helsinki, Finland
- Genres: a cappella/Choral/Pop
- Years active: 1997–present
- Members: Essi Wuorela; Aili Ikonen; Soila Sariola; Antti Annola; Ahti Paunu; Jussi Chydenius
- Website: http://www.rajaton.net/

Rajaton is a Finnish a cappella ensemble, founded in Helsinki in 1997. The Finnish word rajaton means "boundless", to indicate the breadth of their repertoire, from sacred classical to near Europop. Rajaton performs primarily in Finland but also tours around Europe and the rest of the world, having performed in over 25 countries.

In 2005, Rajaton album sales reached 100,000 worldwide. They have earned eight gold records in total, with Rajaton Sings ABBA reaching platinum (30,000) and Joulu reaching double platinum (60,000).

Rajaton mainly performs a cappella, music written or arranged by members of the ensemble. Most lyrics are taken from poetry and from a collection of Finnish folk poetry Kanteletar.

== Members ==
The six members of the group are:

- Soprano: Essi Wuorela
- Mezzo-Soprano: Aili Ikonen (was: Virpi Moskari until 2017)
- Alto: Soila Sariola
- Tenor: Antti Annola
- Baritone: Ahti Paunu
- Bass: Jussi Chydenius

== Discography ==
Rajaton performing in St. John's, Newfoundland and Labrador

- Nova (2000)
- Boundless (2001)
- Sanat (2002)
- Joulu (2003)
- Kevät (2005)
- Out of Bounds (2006)
- Rajaton sings ABBA (2006)
- Maa (2007)
- Rajaton sings Queen with Lahti Symphony Orchestra (2008)
- Best of Rajaton 1999–2009 (2009)
- Tarinoita (2010)
- Jouluyö (2011)
- Suomen Lasten Lauluja (2012)
- Salaisuus (2016)
- Tuhansien Laulujen Maa (2017)
- Ja niin on taasen joulu (2019)
