= Jussi Chydenius =

Finnish musician and composer

- Born: 30 December 1972 (age 52)
- Origin: Helsinki, Finland
- Genres: Pop, A cappella
- Occupation(s): Drummer, singer, arranger
- Instrument(s): Vocals, drums

Jussi Chydenius (born 30 December 1972) is a Finnish musician and composer. He is best known for singing bass in the vocal ensemble Rajaton.

He is the son of composer Kaj Chydenius and director Kaisa Korhonen. His brother is music producer Kalle Chydenius. He played drums for the rock band Don Huonot from 1989 to 2001 and was a founding member. He also starred in the sketch comedy show Vintiöt. Chydenius was elected at the City Council of Helsinki in 2001 where he is also a member of the Cultural Board.

In a review of a recent Rajaton concert, one writer noted that Chydenius, "sounds like a double-bass or creates an entire drum corps, realistically snapping out a snare drum rhythm and rolling it off into silence." Of the group, he noted, "Cymbals splash from everywhere in the group as needed but all these effects, marvellously, reach a pared-down level of subtlety which is neither under- nor over-done. The tiniest vocal inflection is inserted precisely in place, not studied, but spontaneous."
