= Sentenced discography =

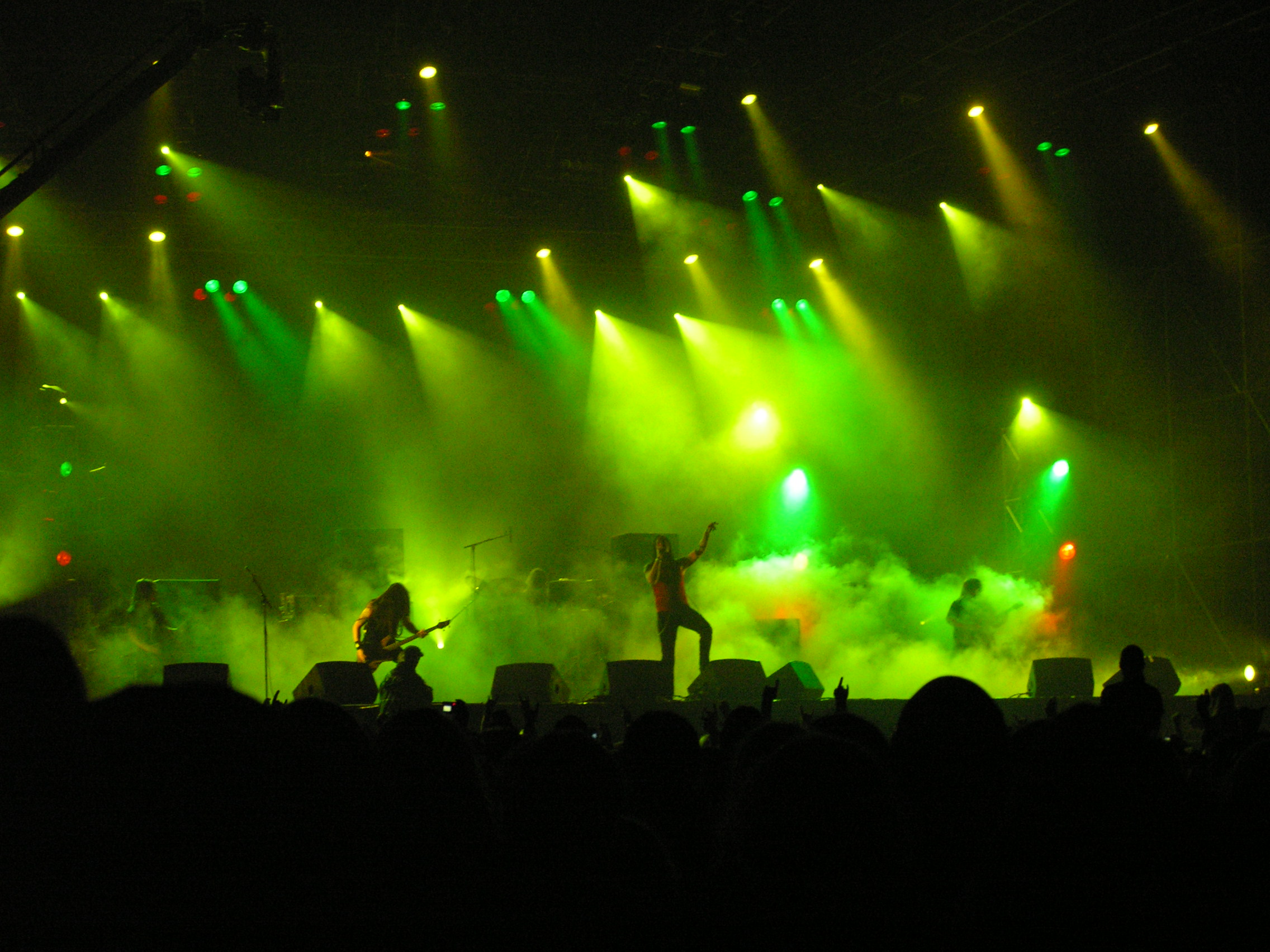
- Sentenced, 2005
- Studio albums: 8
- EPs: 2
- Live albums: 1
- Compilation albums: 3
- Singles: 4
- Video albums: 1
- Music videos: 8
- Demos: 3

This is a comprehensive discography of Sentenced, a Finnish metal band.

== Studio albums ==
Title	Album details	Peak chart positions				Sales	Certifications
Title	Album details	FIN	GER	AUT	JPN	Sales	Certifications
Shadows of the Past	Released: November 1991; Label: Thrash Records; Formats: CD, CS, LP	—	—	—	—		
North from Here	Released: 1 June 1993; Label: Spinefarm Records; Formats: CD, CS, LP, digital download	—	—	—	—		
Amok	Released: 3 January 1995; Label: Century Media; Formats: CD, CS, LP, digital download	—	—	—	—		
Down	Released: 11 November 1996; Label: Century Media; Formats: CD, CS, LP, digital download	14	—	—	—	US: 4,000+	
Frozen	Released: 15 July 1998; Label: Century Media; Formats: CD, CS, LP, digital download	3	73	—	—	US: 4,000+	
Crimson	Released: 17 January 2000; Label: Century Media; Formats: CD, CS, LP, digital download	1	47	—	—	US: 7,000+	
The Cold White Light	Released: 13 May 2002; Label: Century Media; Formats: CD, CS, LP, digital download	1	45	—	—	FIN: 16,000+	FIN: Gold
The Funeral Album	Released: 30 May 2005; Label: Century Media; Formats: CD, LP, digital download	1	49	59	62	FIN: 14,000+	FIN: Gold
"—" denotes a recording that did not chart or was not released in that territory.

== Compilation albums ==
Title	Album details	Peak chart positions	Sales	Certifications
Title	Album details	FIN	Sales	Certifications
Story: Greatest Kills > Greatest Kills > Story: A Recollection	Released: 24 November 1997; Label: Century Media; Formats: CD	7	FIN: 24,000	FIN: Gold
Coffin – The Complete Discography	Released: 13 November 2009; Label: Century Media; Formats: CD+DVD	22		
Death Metal Orchestra from Finland	Released: 15 October 2012; Label: Century Media; Formats: CS+LP	—		
The Urn – Complete Studio Recordings	Released: 20 July 2022; Label: Lipposen Levy Ja Kasetti; Formats: 13×LP	1		
"—" denotes a recording that did not chart or was not released in that territory.

== EPs ==
List of EPs
Title	Album details
The Trooper	Released: 7 October 1994; Label: Spinefarm Records; Formats: CD, CS, LP
Love & Death	Released: 25 September 1995; Label: Century Media; Formats: CD

== Live albums ==
List of live albums
Title	Album details
Buried Alive	Released: 21 November 2006; Label: Century Media; Formats: CD, LP, digital download

== Demos ==
List of demos
Title	Album details
When Death Joins Us	Released: 10 November 1990; Label: Self-released; Formats: CS
Rotting Ways to Misery	Released: June 1991; Label: Self-released; Formats: CS
Journey to Pohjola	Released: March 1992; Label: Self-released; Formats: CS

== Split albums ==
List of split albums
Title	Album details	Notes
Cronology of Death	Released: 1991; Label: Black Out; Formats: LP	split with Carbonized, Bluuurgh..., and Xenophobia

== Singles ==
Year	Title	Peak chart positions	Album
Year	Title	FIN	Album
1999	"Killing Me Killing You"	5	Crimson
2002	"No One There"	2	The Cold White Light
2003	"Routasydän"	—	—
2005	"Ever-Frost"	1	The Funeral Album
"—" denotes a recording that did not chart or was not released in that territory.

== Video albums ==
Title	Album details	Peak chart positions		Sales	Certifications
Title	Album details	FIN	JPN	Sales	Certifications
Buried Alive	Released: 21 November 2006; Label: Century Media; Formats: DVD	1	80	FIN: 11,000+	FIN: Platinum

== Music videos ==
Year	Title	Directed	Album
1995	"Nepenthe"	—	Amok
1996	"Noose"	Sökö Kaukoranta	Down
1998	"The Suicider"	—	Frozen
2000	"Killing Me Killing You"	Pasi Pauni	Crimson
2002	"No One There"	Pete Veijalainen	The Cold White Light
2005	"Ever-Frost"	Mika Ronkainen	The Funeral Album
2006	"May Today Become The Day"	Mika Ronkainen	Buried Alive
2006	"Despair-Ridden Hearts"	Mika Ronkainen	Buried Alive
