= Taneli =

- Gender: Male
- Language: Finnish

Origin
- Region of origin: Finland

Taneli is a Finnish masculine given name and surname. It is a variation of the hebrew "Daniel", meaning "Judged by god." Notable people with the name include:

As a given name:

- Taneli Jarva (born 1975), Finnish musician (Sentenced, The Black League) and tattoo artist
- Taneli Kuusisto (1905–1988), Finnish composer, music critic, teacher and choir leader
- Taneli Mäkelä (born 1959), Finnish actor and writer
- Taneli Mustonen (born 1978), Finnish film director
- Taneli Nykänen (1845–1927), was a Finnish politician and farmer
- Taneli Siikaluoma (born 1994), Finnish ice hockey player
- Taneli Tikka (born 1978), Finnish technology entrepreneur
- Taneli Typpö (1878–1960), Finnish politician

As a surname:

- Heikki Taneli (born 1980), Finnish high jumper
