= Nizhe =

Studio album by KYPCK
- Released: 9 February 2011
- Recorded: Yellow House Studio, 2009–2010
- Genre: Doom metal, sludge metal
- Length: 57:16
- Language: Russian
- Label: Fono Records, Playground Music
- Producer: K. H. M. Hiilesmaa

KYPCK chronology
| Cherno (2008) | Nizhe (2011) | Imena na Stene (2014) |

Professional ratings
Review scores
| Source | Rating |
|---|---|
| Desibeli.net | 4/5 stars |
| Imperiumi.net | 7/10 stars |
| Kaaoszine | 8/10 stars |

Nizhe (Cyrillic: Ниже; Russian for "below") is the second studio album by Finnish doom metal band KYPCK, released on 9 February 2011 by Fono Records in CIS and by Playground Music in Europe.

The last song, "Vals Smerti", is an instrumental. It is dedicated to the memory of Sentenced guitarist Miika Tenkula, who died in 2009.

== Track listing ==
| No. | Title | Length |
|---|---|---|
| 1. | "Gifarus" | 1:49 |
| 2. | "Posle" ("After") | 7:36 |
| 3. | "Allyeya Stalina" ("The Alley of Stalin") | 4:03 |
| 4. | "Chuzhoj" ("Stranger") | 9:16 |
| 5. | "Felitsa" | 5:34 |
| 6. | "Razryv" ("Rupture") | 7:35 |
| 7. | "Burlaki Na Volge" ("Burlaks on the Volga") | 5:52 |
| 8. | "Bardak" ("Brothel") | 4:56 |
| 9. | "Tovarishcham" ("To Comrades") | 6:29 |
| 10. | "Vals Smerti" ("Death Waltz") | 4:06 |
| Total length: | | 57:16 |

== Personnel ==
- E. Seppänen – vocals
- S. S. Lopakka – guitar
- J. T. Ylä-Rautio – bass
- K. H. M. Hiilesmaa – drums

== Chart ==
| Chart (2011) | Peak position |
|---|---|
| Finnish Albums (Suomen virallinen lista) | 16 |
