= Solution 13 =

Finnish metal band

- Origin: Finland
- Genres: Groove metal
- Years active: 2000–?
- Label: Low Frequency Records
- Members: Risto Stenroos; Sami Kukkohovi; Tarmo Kanerva; Petri Sääskö; Antti Remes
- Past members: Ilkka Järvenpää

Solution 13 is a Finnish metal band consisting of Risto Stenroos, Sami Kukkohovi, Tarmo Kanerva and Petri Sääskö.

== History ==
In 2000, Petri, Ilkka Järvenpää and Tarmo started writing some songs, using the name Confusion Red. They recorded a demo CD in December, inviting Sami Kukkohovi (bass player of Sentenced) to play bass as a session musician. He became a full member of the band shortly afterward.

In 2001, the band changed their name to Solution 13 and recorded a second demo. The German magazine Rock Hard used the track "No Reply" from this demo on a free compilation CD.

In November 2001, they recorded their self-titled debut album with producer Kari Vähäkuopus, which was released through Finland's Low Frequency Records in autumn of 2002.

Vocalist Ilkka Järvenpää left in March 2004 and was replaced by singer Risto Stenroos.

== Roster ==
=== Current members ===
- Petri Sääskö – guitar
- Risto Stenroos – vocals
- Sami Kukkohovi – bass (also in KYPCK, formerly in Sentenced)
- Tarmo Kanerva – drums (also in Poisonblack, formerly session member in Sentenced)

=== Support members ===
- Antti Remes – live bass (also in Poisonblack)

=== Former members ===
- Ilkka Järvenpää – vocals (now in National Napalm Syndicate)

== Discography ==
Demo CD (2000)
1. Never Let You Go
2. Grace
3. I Confess
4. Reflection of Prejudice
Demo CD 2 (2001)
1. No Reply
2. Hallow Void
3. Breathe
4. Imitation of Me
Solution 13 (2002)
1. Never Let You Go
2. Sink to My Level
3. Isolation
4. Demi-God
5. Regression
6. Breathe
7. Hate
8. Grace
9. Hallow Void
10. No Reply
11. Imitation of Me
