= Ville Laihiala =

Finnish musician

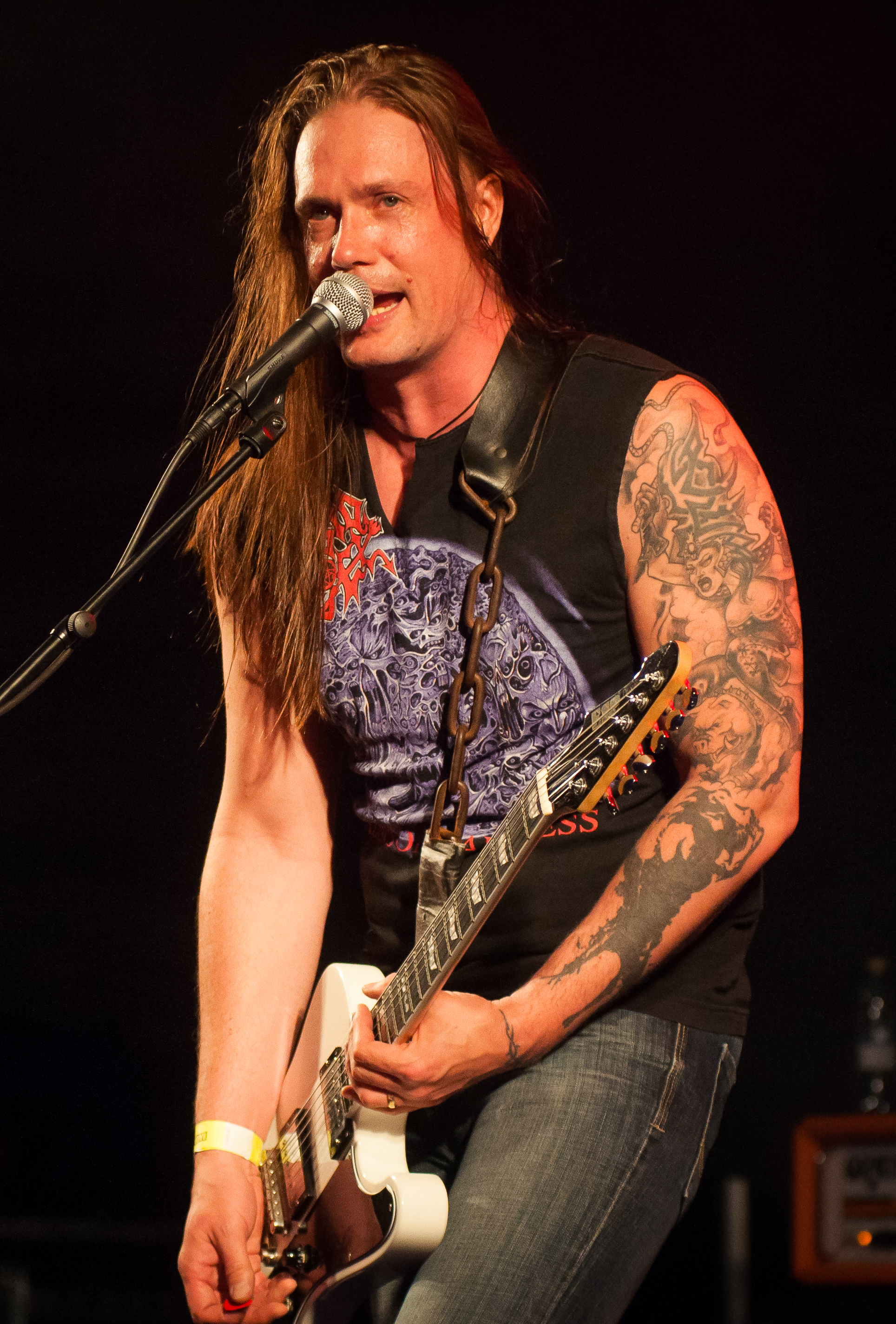
- Laihiala in 2014

Background information
- Born: 13 June 1973 (age 53); Oulu, Finland
- Genres: Gothic metal, heavy metal
- Occupation: Musician
- Instruments: Vocals, guitar
- Years active: 1996–present
- Formerly of: Sentenced, Poisonblack, S-TOOL

Ville Laihiala (born 13 June 1973) is a Finnish musician. He was the vocalist and guitarist of the gothic metal band Poisonblack, and the frontman for Sentenced from 1996 (when he replaced their former bassist and vocalist Taneli Jarva) until the group ended their career in 2005. When joining Sentenced, he was soon accepted by fans. He wrote very few songs for Sentenced (whose main songwriters were Miika Tenkula and Sami Lopakka), for example the song "Aika Multaa Muistot" on the album The Cold White Light.

== Personal life ==
In 2019 he was charged with aggravated drunk driving.

== Discography ==
Sentenced

- Down (1996/Century Media)
- Frozen (1998/Century Media)
- Crimson (2000/Century Media)
- The Cold White Light (2002/Century Media)
- The Funeral Album (2005/Century Media)

Poisonblack

- Escapexstacy (2003/Century Media)
- Lust Stained Despair (2006/Century Media)
- A Dead Heavy Day (2008/Century Media)
- Of Rust and Bones (2010/Century Media)
- Drive (2011/Hype Records)
- Lyijy (2013/Warner Music Finland)

S-TOOL

- Tolerance 0 (2017/Playground Music)
- Exitus (2020/Playground Music)

Ville Laihiala & Saattajat

Ei meillä ole kuin loisemme (2022/Sakara Records)
