= Imena na Stene =

Studio album by KYPCK
- Released: 21 March 2014
- Recorded: November–December 2013
- Genre: Doom metal
- Length: 53:11
- Language: Russian
- Label: Ranka Kustannus
- Producer: Hiili Hiilesmaa

KYPCK chronology
Nizhe (2011)	Imena na Stene (2014)	Zero (2016)

Professional ratings
Review scores
Source	Rating
Imperiumi.net	7/10 stars
Metalstorm	8.7/10 stars
Soundi	2/5 stars

Imena na Stene (Cyrillic: Имена на стене, "names on the wall") is the third studio album by the Finnish doom metal band KYPCK. It was released on 21 March 2014 under the record label Ranka Kustannus. The album debuted at Finland's official list in number 9.

== Track listing ==
1. Prorok (Пророк) - 6:16
2. Imja na Stene (Имя на стене) - 4:53
3. Voskresenije (Воскресение) - 4:41
4. Deti Birkenau (Дети Биркенау) - 7:25
5. Grjaznyi geroi (Грязный герой) - 3:58
6. Kak philosophy gubit samootveržennyh, beskorystnyh bjurokratov (Как философия губит самоотверженных, бескорыстных бюрократов) - 4:30
7. Belorusski sneg (Белорусский снег) - 4:53
8. Vsegda tak bylo (Всегда так было) - 3:42
9. Etoi pesni net (Этой песни нет) - 5:06
10. Tros, gruzovik i temnyi Balkon (Tros, грузовик и темный балкон) - 7:47

== Personnel ==
Band

- A. K. Karihtala (Antti Karihtala) - drums
- S. Kukkohovi (Sami Kukkohovi) - guitar
- S. S. Lopakka (Sami Lopakka) - guitar
- E. Seppänen (Erkki Seppänen) - vocals
- J. T. Ylä-Rautio (Jaska Ylä-Rautio) - bass

Production

- Hiili Hiilesmaa - producer, recorder, mixer, master
- Jussi Kulomaa - recorder (vocals), producer (vocals), backing vocals in songs 4 and 6

== Chart ==
Chart (2011)	Peak position
Finnish Albums (Suomen virallinen lista)	9
