= The Man-Eating Tree =

Finnish gothic metal band

- Origin: Oulu, Finland
- Genres: Gothic metal
- Years active: 2009–present
- Labels: Noble Demon Records, Century Media, Cobra Metal
- Members: Janne Markus; Manne Ikonen; Aksu Hanttu; Mika "June" Junttila; Sakke Paavola
- Website: themaneatingtree.fi

The Man-Eating Tree is a Finnish atmospheric gothic metal band formed in Oulu in 2009. It features musicians who have appeared in bands such as Poisonblack, Entwine, Ghost Brigade, Mors Subita.

== History ==
=== Vine (2009–2010) ===
The band started in 2009 when Vesa Ranta formed the band. The final line-up was ready: Tuomas Tuominen, Janne Markus, Antti Karhu, Mikko Uusimaa, Heidi Määttä. First demo recordings were made in the spring and summer of 2009. In 2010, the first album Vine was made a reality. Producer was Hiili Hiilesmaa. The band kicked off with a No. 3 on the Finnish charts for their first single "Out of the Wind". After releasing their debut album Vine (2010) outside of Finland, Century Media Records signed The Man-Eating Tree worldwide. They made an extensive Finnish tour supporting bands such as Bullet for My Valentine, Katatonia, KYPCK and after that joined Tarot for a big Europe tour.

=== Harvest (2010–2011) ===
The band returned soon to studio to record their second album "Harvest" again with Hiili Hiilesmaa as a producer. This time the crew is strengthened by Antti Karhu. Now the band toured Amorphis and Leprous.

=== In the Absence of Light (2015) ===
After four years, the band released their third album on 20 March 2015. This album featured vocals from the band's new vocalist Antti Kumpulainen.

=== 2024 ===
The band announced their comeback on social media in November 2024, and the line-up has undergone big changes. There is a new album coming out in 2025 via Noble Demon Records and they will also be performing live.

== Band members ==
=== Current members ===
- Sakke Paavola - guitars (2024-present)
- Janne Markus – guitar and vocals (2009–present)
- Manne Ikonen – vocals (2024-present)
- Marco Sneck – keyboards (2016–present)
- Samuli Lindberg – drums (2018–present)

=== Former members ===
- Aaron Rantonen – guitar (2009)
- Tuomas Tuominen – vocals (2009–2013)
- Heidi Määttä – keyboard (2009–2013)
- Mikko Uusimaa – bass (2009–2015)
- Antti Karhu – guitar (2011–2015)
- Antti Kumpulainen - vocals (2013-2023)
- Vesa Ranta – drums (2009–2017)
- Altti Veteläinen – bass (2016–2018)
- Jami Heikkala – guitar (2016–2018)

=== Session members ===
- Aksu Hanttu – drums (2011–2012)
- Antti Karhu – guitar, backing vocals (2011)
- Miika "Viiru" Pesonen – guitar (2012)
- Rauli Alaruikka – bass (2013)
- Jami Heikkala – guitar (2015–2016)

== Discography ==
=== Studio albums ===
- Vine (2010)
- Harvest (2011)
- In the Absence of Light (2015)
- Night Verses (2025)

=== DVD ===
- The Making of "Harvest"

=== Singles ===
- "Out of the Wind" (2010)
- "Vultures" (2010)

== Videography ==
- "Out of the Wind" (2010)
- "This Longitude of Sleep" (2010)
- "Amended" (2010)
- "Of Birth for Passing" (2011)
- "Armed" (2011)
- "Code of Surrender" (2012)
- "Incendere" (2012)
