= Zero (KYPCK album) =

Studio album by KYPCK
- Released: 16 September 2016
- Recorded: 2015–2016
- Studio: Coal House, Sound Supreme, MSTR, Mausoleum and Novaya Zemlya Studios
- Genre: Doom metal
- Length: 60:55
- Language: Russian
- Label: Ranka Kustannus
- Producer: Hiili Hiilesmaa

KYPCK chronology
Imena na Stene (2014)	Zero (2016)

Zero (Cyrillic: Зеро) is the fourth studio album of the Finnish doom metal band KYPCK. It was released on 16 September 2016 under the label Ranka Kustannus. The album debuted at the Finnish official list in 20th place.

== Reception ==
The album received a positive reception. Kaaosine's Sirpa Pelli found the album excellent, and praised the band' s interest in history, language and culture, as well as black humor. Imperiumi.net reviewer Harju rated the album as the most thoughtful ensemble of its time and one of the best records released in 2016. V2.fi's Jesse Kärkkäinen stated that the album is the band' s most versatile release to date, with its rugged beauty. He named the album one of the most impressive ensembles of the year. According to a Metal Storm review, "With the color palette and subject of that cover, this could only be a Kypck album. With the ghostly echoes of a rattling train bookending the opening and closing tracks, this could only be a Kypck album. With these icy, foreboding riffs and military-style breakdowns, Зеро is a perfect example of a Kypck album."

== Track listing ==
1. Ja svoboden – 5:16 (Cyrillic: Я свободен)
2. 2017 – 5:14
3. Mne otmštšenije – 5:19 (Cyrillic: Мне отмщение)
4. Progulka po Neve – 4:43 (Cyrillic: Прогулка по Неве)
5. Na Nebe vižu ja litso – 11:02 (Cyrillic: На небе вижу я лицо)
6. Moja žizn – 6:01 (Cyrillic: Моя жизнь)
7. Posledni tur – 5:32 (Cyrillic: Последний тур)
8. Rusofob – 5:00 (Cyrillic: Русофоб)
9. Baikal – 5:08 (Cyrillic: Байкал)
10. Belaja smert – 7:40 (Cyrillic: Белая смерть)

== Personnel ==
- Erkki Seppänen – vocals
- Sami Lopakka – guitar
- Sami Kukkohovi – guitar
- Jaska Ylä-Rautio – bass
- Antti Karihtala – drums

Guest musicians

- Jussi Kulomaa – backing vocals
- Anna Jousne – vocals (track 5)
- Ampe Rautiainen – additional guitar (track 1)

Production

- Hiili Hiilesmaa – producer, recorder, mixer, master
- Jussi Kulomaa – producer (vocals), recorder (vocals)
- Petri Laurell – cover photo, photos
- Lopakka – design, layout, logo

== Chart ==
Chart (2011)	Peak position
Finnish Albums (Suomen virallinen lista)	20
