= A Long Way to Nowhere =

A Long Way to Nowhere may refer to:

- A Long Way to Nowhere, an album by the Parkinsons
- "A Long Way to Nowhere", a song by Sentenced from The Funeral Album
- "Long Way to Nowhere", an episode of the drama series Movin' On
