= The Funeral Album =

Studio album by Sentenced
- Released: 31 May 2005
- Recorded: 2004
- Genres: Gothic metal, alternative metal, heavy metal
- Length: 49:49
- Label: Century Media
- Producer: Kai Hiilesmaa

Sentenced chronology
The Cold White Light (2002)	The Funeral Album (2005)

Professional ratings
Review scores
Source	Rating
AllMusic	4/5 stars
Blabbermouth.net	7.5/10
metal.de	9/10

The Funeral Album is the eighth and final album by the Finnish metal band Sentenced. It was released on 31 May 2005.

== Track listing ==
No.	Title	Lyrics	Music	Length
1.	"May Today Become the Day"	Sami Lopakka	Miika Tenkula	4:00
2.	"Ever-Frost"	Lopakka	Tenkula	4:18
3.	"We Are But Falling Leaves"	Lopakka	Tenkula	4:28
4.	"Her Last 5 Minutes"	Lopakka	Lopakka	5:40
5.	"Where Waters Fall Frozen"	(instrumental)	Sentenced	0:58
6.	"Despair-Ridden Hearts"	Lopakka	Tenkula	3:40
7.	"Vengeance Is Mine"	Lopakka	Tenkula	4:15
8.	"A Long Way to Nowhere"	Lopakka	Tenkula	3:26
9.	"Consider Us Dead"	Ville Laihiala	Laihiala	4:51
10.	"Lower the Flags"	Lopakka	Tenkula	3:34
11.	"Drain Me"	Laihiala	Laihiala	4:33
12.	"Karu"	Lopakka (line)	Tenkula	1:03
13.	"End of the Road"	Lopakka	Tenkula	5:00

Japanese edition bonus tracks
No.	Title	Lyrics	Music	Length
14.	"Nepenthe (Live)"	Jarva	Tenkula	4:16
15.	"Brief Is the Light (Live)"	Lopakka	Tenkula	4:47

== Personnel ==
- Ville Laihiala – vocals
- Miika Tenkula – lead guitar
- Sami Lopakka – rhythm guitar
- Sami Kukkohovi – bass
- Vesa Ranta – drums
