= Shadows of the Past (album) =

- 1995 reissue cover

Studio album by Sentenced
- Released: December 1991
- Recorded: October 1991
- Genre: Death metal; death-doom
- Length: 51:03
- Label: Thrash Records

Sentenced chronology
Rotting Ways to Misery (1990)	Shadows of the Past (1991)	North from Here (1993)

Professional ratings
Review scores
Source	Rating
AllMusic	link

Shadows of the Past (originally titled Shadows of Past) is the debut album by the Finnish metal band Sentenced. It was released in 1991 and reissued by Century Media in 1995, including the Journey to Pohjola demo. It was reissued again in 2001 with North from Here and again in 2008 as a two-CD set along with their first two demos.

== Music ==
Shadows of the Past features more prominent death metal elements than would be present later in their career. AllMusic called it " pure death metal". On the introduction speech of North from Here 2008 re-release, Jarva states that at the time of Shadows of the Past the band was just a "Death clone" amongst others, so the band chose to pursue a more technical and personal-sounding direction on their second album.

== Artwork ==
The album has had three different covers: the original release drawn by Luxi Lahtinen, the Century Media 1995 reissue drawn by Taneli Jarva, and the 2008 reissue which is a reproduction of a medieval woodcut print. This version also includes an insert featuring the first two covers.

== Reception ==
Antti J. Ravelin of AllMusic gave the album a negative review, saying the album would only find appeal with fans of the band. he wrote: "It is hilarious to hear lead guitarist Miika Tenkula try to sing while the rest of band play really low and extremely slow, as is the way in their genre. However, the members of Sentenced are quite young while they recorded this debut album, so it is understandable that they didn't make gold."

== Track listing ==
No.	Title	Lyrics	Music	Length
1.	"When the Moment of Death Arrives"	Taneli Jarva	Miika Tenkula	6:03
2.	"Rot to Dead"	Jarva	Tenkula	3:44
3.	"Disengagement"	Sami Lopakka	Lopakka, Tenkula	5:17
4.	"Rotting Ways to Misery"	Lopakka	Tenkula	5:50
5.	"The Truth"	Lopakka	Tenkula	6:23
6.	"Suffocated Beginning of Life"	Jarva	Tenkula	6:06
7.	"Beyond the Distant Valleys"	Korhonen, Lopakka	Lopakka, Tenkula	5:58
8.	"Under the Suffer"	Jarva	Tenkula	5:18
9.	"Descending Curtain of Death"	Tenkula	Vesa Ranta, Tenkula	5:49

=== 1995 reissue bonus tracks ===
No.	Title	Lyrics	Music	Length
10.	"Wings"	Lopakka	Tenkula	5:08
11.	"In Memoriam"	Jarva	Tenkula	5:26
12.	"Mythic Silence (as They Wander in the Mist)"	(instrumental)	Lopakka, Tenkula	4:14

=== 2008 reissue bonus disc ===
==== When Death Joins Us (demo 1990) ====
1. "Hallucinations" – 2:20
2. "When Death Joins Us" – 4:54
3. "Shadows of the Past" – 4:24
4. "Obscurity ..." – 5:10
5. "Desperationed Future" – 4:29

==== Rotting Ways to Misery (demo 1991) ====
1. "Rotting Ways to Misery" – 5:42
2. "Disengagement" – 6:18
3. "Suffocated Beginning of Life" – 6:15
4. "Under the Suffer" – 5:16
5. "Descending Curtain of Death" – 5:34
6. "The Truth" – 5:28

== Credits ==
- Miika Tenkula – lead guitar, vocals
- Sami Lopakka – guitar
- Taneli Jarva – bass
- Vesa Ranta – drums
