= Church Bells =

Church bells are bells rung from churches.

Church Bells may also refer to:

- "Church Bells" (song), a 2016 song by Carrie Underwood
- "Church Bells", a song by Smothers Brothers from the 1963 album Curb Your Tongue, Knave!

== See also ==
- "The Church Bells of Konevets" a Karelian folk song, best known as the 1975 recording of Finnish musical group Piirpauke
