= Flavor of the Month =

Flavor of the Month may refer to:

- "Flavor of the Month", a 1993 song by the Posies from Frosting on the Beater
- "Flavor of the Month", a 1991 song by Black Sheep from A Wolf in Sheep's Clothing
- "The Flavor of the Month", a 2013 song by Poisonblack from Lyijy
- Flavor of the Month, a 1994 novel by Olivia Goldsmith
- Flavor of the Month, a 2003 novel by Tori Carrington
- Flavor of the Month, a 1990 Philippine film starring Lito Pimentel

== See also ==
- "Flavor of the Weak", a song by American Hi-Fi
