= Of Rust and Bones =

Studio album by Poisonblack
- Released: 22 March 2010
- Recorded: August–September 2009
- Studio: NEOstudio, Oulu and Matrixtor & Coalhole Studio, Hämeenlinna
- Genre: Heavy metal, gothic metal, gothic rock
- Label: Century Media
- Producer: Hiili Hiilesmaa

Poisonblack chronology
A Dead Heavy Day (2008)	Of Rust and Bones (2010)	Drive (2011)

Of Rust and Bones is the fourth studio album by the Finnish gothic metal band Poisonblack. It was released on 22 March 2010 in Europe by Century Media Records.

== Track listing ==
All music by Laihiala, except for tracks 1, 3, 6 and 8 by Markus. All lyrics by Laihiala, except for track 3 by Seppänen (KYPCK's vocalist). All arrangements by Poisonblack.

1. "Sun Shines Black" – 4:50
2. "Leech" – 3:48
3. "My World" – 3:57
4. "Buried Alive" – 4:39
5. "Invisible" – 8:07
6. "Casket Case" – 3:44
7. "Down the Drain" – 8:03
8. "Alone" – 4:43
9. "The Last Song" – 7:33
10. "My World (Acoustic)" – 3:22 (bonus track for Japan)
11. "Half Past Dead" – 5:52 (bonus track for Japan)

== Personnel ==
=== Poisonblack ===
- Ville Laihiala – vocals, lead guitar, backing vocals
- Janne Markus – guitar & backing vocals
- Antti Remes – bass
- Tarmo Kanerva – drums
- Marco Sneck – keyboards

=== Production ===
- Hiili Hiilesmaa – recording, engineering, mixing, backing vocals
