= Crimson (Sentenced album) =

Studio album by Sentenced
- Released: January 17, 2000
- Recorded: September 1999
- Studio: Tico Tico Studios
- Genre: Gothic metal
- Length: 54:47
- Label: Century Media

Sentenced chronology
Frozen (1998)	Crimson (2000)	The Cold White Light (2002)

Professional ratings
Review scores
Source	Rating
AllMusic	2.5/5 stars

Crimson is the sixth album by the Finnish metal band Sentenced, released in January 2000 on Century Media. The album artwork was done by Niklas Sundin of Dark Tranquillity. Coincidentally, Dark Tranquillity recorded a cover version of the song "Broken", released as a track on Century Media: Covering 20 Years of Extremes.

== Track listing ==
No.	Title	Lyrics	Music	Length
1.	"Bleed in My Arms"	Ville Laihiala	Laihiala	5:09
2.	"Home in Despair"	Sami Lopakka	Miika Tenkula	3:48
3.	"Fragile"	Lopakka	Lopakka, Tenkula	5:55
4.	"No More Beating as One"	Laihiala	Laihiala	4:15
5.	"Broken"	Lopakka	Tenkula	4:31
6.	"Killing Me Killing You"	Lopakka	Tenkula	5:26
7.	"Dead Moon Rising"	Lopakka	Lopakka	4:55
8.	"The River"	Lopakka	Tenkula	4:50
9.	"One More Day"	Lopakka	Tenkula	5:12
10.	"With Bitterness and Joy"	Lopakka	Tenkula	4:43
11.	"My Slowing Heart"	Lopakka	Tenkula	5:57

Japanese edition bonus track
No.	Title	Lyrics	Music	Length
12.	"Killing Me Killing You (Single Edit)"	Lopakka	Tenkula	4:12

== Credits ==
- Ville Laihiala – vocals
- Miika Tenkula – guitar
- Sami Lopakka – guitar
- Sami Kukkohovi – bass
- Vesa Ranta – drums

== Notes ==
The digipak version and the 2007 reissue both contain the video for "Killing Me Killing You".
