= North from Here =

Studio album by Sentenced
- Released: 1 June 1993
- Recorded: 1992–1993
- Genre: Technical death metal; melodic death metal; black metal
- Length: 43:53
- Label: Spinefarm Records

Sentenced chronology
Shadows of the Past (1991)	North from Here (1993)	Amok (1995)

Professional ratings
Review scores
Source	Rating
AllMusic	link

North from Here is the second album by the Finnish metal band Sentenced. Lyrics of the album deal with Sentenced's typical melancholy, but some also deal with the mythology and history of Finnish warfare and the national romantic epic of Kalevala. Prior the release of North From Here the band had developed their playing skills further and established a more personal sound, drawing influence from a number of extreme metal bands including Atheist, Nocturnus, Bathory, and the early works of Darkthrone (namely the band's death metal debut, Soulside Journey), but on the opposite spectrum, also more rock-oriented acts such as Faith No More and Primus.

== Track listing ==
No.	Title	Lyrics	Music	Length
1.	"My Sky Is Darker Than Thine"	Taneli Jarva	Miika Tenkula, Jarva	5:46
2.	"Wings"	Sami Lopakka	Tenkula	4:28
3.	"Fields of Blood; Harvester of Hate"	Jarva	Tenkula, Lopakka	6:15
4.	"Capture of Fire"	Lopakka	Lopakka	6:32
5.	"Awaiting the Winter Frost"	Lopakka	Tenkula	5:48
6.	"Beyond the Wall of Sleep"	Jarva	Jarva	3:34
7.	"Northern Lights"	Lopakka	Tenkula	5:15
8.	"Epic"	Jarva	Lopakka	5:55

=== 2008 reissue bonus disc ===
==== Journey to Pohjola (demo 1992) ====
1. "Wings" – 5:09
2. "In Memoriam" – 5:26
3. "Mystic Silence (As They Wander in the Mist)" – 4:14

==== The Trooper EP (1994) ====
1. "The Trooper" (Iron Maiden cover) – 3:16
2. "Desert by Night" – 6:29
3. "In Memoriam (Old School Mastering)" – 5:25
4. "Awaiting the Winter Frost (Old School Mastering)" – 5:48

==== Lost Treasures ====
1. "The Glow of 1000 Suns" – 4:30
2. "Amok Run" – 4:43

== Credits ==
- Sami Lopakka – guitars, keyboards
- Miika Tenkula – guitars
- Taneli Jarva – bass, vocals
- Vesa Ranta – drums
