= Amok (Sentenced album) =

Studio album by Sentenced
- Released: 3 January 1995
- Recorded: 1994
- Studio: Tico-Tico Studios
- Genres: Melodic death metal, heavy metal, doom metal, gothic metal
- Length: 43:35
- Label: Century Media
- Producer: Ahti Kortelainen

Sentenced chronology
| North from Here (1993) | Amok (1995) | Down (1996) |

Professional ratings
Review scores
| Source | Rating |
|---|---|
| AllMusic | 4.5/5 stars |

Amok is the third album by the Finnish metal band Sentenced, released through Century Media in 1995. Though still mostly rooted in the death metal genre, the album takes the melodic death metal direction of 1993's North from Here a step further by blending it with traditional heavy metal, doom metal, and the gothic metal style that the band would take on with subsequent releases, following bassist/vocalist Taneli Jarva's departure.

The lyrics are a mixture of melancholy, mythology and philosophical themes.

An episode of the TV series Home Improvement had the character Mark (played by Taran Noah Smith) wearing a T-shirt that featured the album.

== Track listing ==
| No. | Title | Lyrics | Music | Length |
|---|---|---|---|---|
| 1. | "The War Ain't Over!" | Taneli Jarva | Miika Tenkula | 4:17 |
| 2. | "Phenix" | Jarva | Tenkula | 5:32 |
| 3. | "New Age Messiah" | Jarva | Tenkula | 4:29 |
| 4. | "Forever Lost" | Sami Lopakka | Lopakka | 7:15 |
| 5. | "Funeral Spring" | Jarva | Jarva | 3:55 |
| 6. | "Nepenthe" | Jarva | Tenkula | 3:53 |
| 7. | "Dance on the Graves (Lil' Siztah)" | Jarva | Tenkula | 4:27 |
| 8. | "Moon Magick" | Jarva | Jarva | 4:45 |
| 9. | "The Golden Stream of Lapland" | (instrumental) | Tenkula | 4:58 |
| Total length: | | | | 43:35 |

Japanese edition bonus tracks
| No. | Title | Length |
|---|---|---|
| 5. | "Dreamlands" | 5:14 |
| 9. | "Obsession" | 5:28 |
| Total length: | | 54:17 |

== Personnel ==
- Taneli Jarva – vocals, bass, keyboards
- Miika Tenkula – guitar, keyboards
- Sami Lopakka – guitars, keyboards
- Vesa Ranta – drums

Guest musician

- Virpi Rautsiala – backing vocals
