= Keep My Grave Open (disambiguation) =

Keep My Grave Open may refer to:

- Keep My Grave Open, a 1977 S. F. Brownrigg film starring Camilla Carr and Gene Ross
- Keep My Grave Open, song on Down (Sentenced album)
