= Drain Me =

Drain Me may refer to:

- "Drain Me", a song by Sentenced from The Funeral Album
- "Drain Me", a song by Slaves on Dope from Metafour
- "Drain Me", a song recorded by Model Child and written by Danny Parker
