= The Cold White Light =

Studio album by Sentenced
- Released: 13 May 2002
- Genre: Gothic metal, alternative metal
- Length: 45:39
- Label: Century Media

Sentenced chronology
Crimson (2000)	The Cold White Light (2002)	The Funeral Album (2005)

Professional ratings
Review scores
Source	Rating
AllMusic	4/5 stars

The Cold White Light is an album by the Finnish metal band Sentenced, released in May 2002 on Century Media. Limited copies contain the video for the song "Killing Me Killing You" from the band's previous album Crimson plus a free Sentenced sticker. Konevitsan kirkonkellot ("The Church Bells of Konevets") was originally recorded by Piirpauke in 1974.

== Track listing ==
No.	Title	Lyrics	Music	Length
1.	"Konevitsan kirkonkellot"	(instrumental)	Traditional	1:40
2.	"Cross My Heart and Hope to Die"	Sami Lopakka	Lopakka	4:04
3.	"Brief Is the Light"	Lopakka	Miika Tenkula	4:23
4.	"Neverlasting"	Ville Laihiala	Laihiala	3:35
5.	"Aika multaa muistot [Everything Is Nothing]"	Laihiala	Laihiala	4:33
6.	"Excuse Me While I Kill Myself"	The Serial Self-Killer	M. Steelgrave	3:48
7.	"Blood & Tears"	Lopakka	Tenkula	4:15
8.	"You Are the One"	Lopakka	Tenkula	4:29
9.	"Guilt and Regret"	Lopakka	Tenkula	3:44
10.	"The Luxury of a Grave"	Lopakka	Tenkula	4:44
11.	"No One There"	Lopakka	Tenkula	6:14

== Credits ==
- Ville Laihiala – vocals
- Miika Tenkula – guitar
- Sami Lopakka – guitar
- Sami Kukkohovi – bass
- Vesa Ranta – drums
