= Frozen (album) =

1998 studio album by Sentenced

Studio album by Sentenced
- Released: 15 July 1998
- Genre: Gothic metal
- Length: 48:43
- Label: Century Media

Sentenced chronology
Down (1996)	Frozen (1998)	Crimson (2000)

Professional ratings
Review scores
Source	Rating
AllMusic	3/5 stars

Frozen is an album by the Finnish metal band Sentenced, released on 15 July 1998 via Century Media. It is the first album with bassist Sami Kukkohovi after former bassist/vocalist Taneli Jarva's departure.

== Track listing ==
All lyrics are written by Sami Lopakka, except where noted; all music is composed by Miika Tenkula, except where noted.

No.	Title	Lyrics	Music	Length
1.	"Kaamos"	(instrumental)		1:32
2.	"Farewell"	Ville Laihiala	Laihiala	3:44
3.	"Dead Leaves"			5:26
4.	"For the Love I Bear"	Laihiala		3:28
5.	"One with Misery"	Laihiala	Laihiala	3:35
6.	"The Suicider"			3:43
7.	"The Rain Comes Falling Down"			6:17
8.	"Grave Sweet Grave"			3:55
9.	"Burn"			2:46
10.	"Drown Together"			5:08
11.	"Let Go (The Last Chapter)"			4:24
12.	"Mourn"	(instrumental)		4:43

Japanese edition bonus track
No.	Title	Length
13.	"No Tomorrow"	4:35

2007 reissue bonus tracks
No.	Title	Writer(s)	Original artist	Length
13.	"Creep"	Radiohead; Albert Hammond; Mike Hazlewood	Radiohead	3:53
14.	"Digging the Grave"	Mike Patton; Billy Gould; Mike Bordin	Faith No More	2:57
15.	"I Wanna Be Somebody"	Blackie Lawless	W.A.S.P.	3:30
16.	"The House of the Rising Sun"	Traditional	Traditional	4:06

=== Limited edition ===
1. "The Suicider"
2. "Dead Leaves"
3. "For the Love I Bear"
4. "Creep" (Radiohead cover)
5. "Digging the Grave" (Faith No More cover)
6. "Kaamos"
7. "Farewell"
8. "One with Misery"
9. "Grave Sweet Grave"
10. "Burn"
11. "Drown Together"
12. "Let Go (The Last Chapter)"
13. "The Rain Comes Falling Down"
14. "Mourn"
15. "I Wanna Be Somebody" (W.A.S.P. cover)
16. "House of the Rising Sun" (The Animals cover)

== Personnel ==
- Ville Laihiala – vocals
- Miika Tenkula – guitar
- Sami Lopakka – guitar
- Sami Kukkohovi – bass
- Vesa Ranta – drums

Guest musician

- Birgit Zacher – backing vocals
