= Piirpauke =

Finnish band

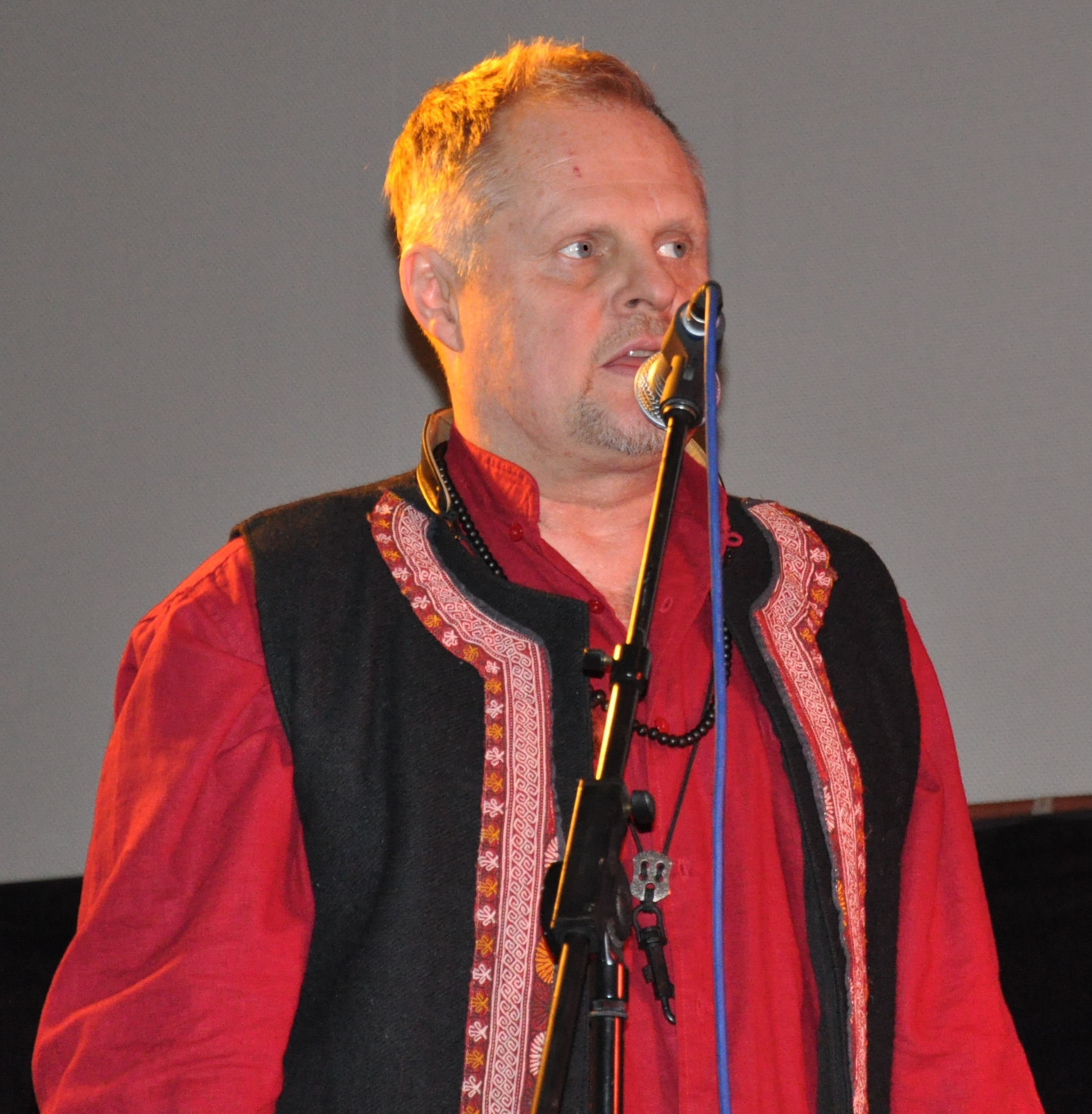
- Sakari Kukko in 2009

Background information
- Origin: Finland
- Genres: Folk, world music, jazz fusion, progressive rock
- Years active: 1974–present
- Labels: Rockadillo Records (1986–present); Jaro Medien (1983–1984); Kerberos (1981); Ponsi (1980); Love Records (1975–1978)
- Members: Sakari Kukko; Ismaila Sané; Eerik Siikasaari; Rami Eskelinen; Nicholas Rehn
- Website: rockadillo.fi/piirpauke

Piirpauke is a Finnish musical group combining free jazz, flamenco, mbalax, Arabesque, carnatic, romantic, modern, classical, humppa, impressionist, hindustani, salsa, Amharic, Lappjoik, Tibetan, Balkan, Karelian, Finnish, national romantic and rock music influences (among others) in their compositions.

The band was founded in 1974 by the keyboardist-saxophonist Sakari Kukko, who is the only original member left in the band today. In addition to a large number of Finnish musicians, several musicians from various countries have also played in Piirpauke.

The name "Piirpauke" comes from an Sakari Kukko's Karelian father and means a noise or a racket.

The band has released 20 studio albums as well as several live and compilation albums. In October 2010 their album Koli peaked number one at the World Music Charts Europe. Piirpauke's best known song in Finland is "Konevitsan kirkonkellot" ("The Church Bells of Konevets"), based on a traditional Karelian melody. It is named after the Konevsky Monastery in the Konevets island of Lake Ladoga. The song was covered by heavy metal band Sentenced in their 2002 album The Cold White Light. In Central Europe the biggest hit is so far "Swedish Reggae".

The most active period was 1979–1993, when Piirpauke was touring regularly especially in Central Europe. A typical venue was a big jazz, rock and world music festival, or a big club like Fabrik in Hamburg-Altona. The same stages were occupied by the biggest names of those days like Miles Davis, Astor Piazzola, Ravi Shankar and Nirvana, just to mention a few from different genres. A typical tour would last about a month with 30 gigs, the record being 45 concerts in one month.

The latest album "Hali" has been released in 2019.

== Band members ==
- Sakari Kukko – saxophone, piano, keyboards, vocals
- Ari Hossi – bass
- Ilmari Heikinheimo – drums
- Matti Salo – guitar

=== Selected former members ===
- Hasse Walli – guitar (1974–1978)
- Jukka Tolonen – guitar (1987)
- Badu Ndiaye – guitar

=== Guest members ===
- Ismaila Sane – percussion, vocals
- Mika Mylläri – trumpet

== Discography ==
=== Studio albums ===
- Piirpauke (1975)
- Piirpauke 2 (1976)
- Yö Kyöpelinvuorella (1980)
- Birgi Bühtüi (1981)
- Kirkastus (1981)
- Ilahu Illalla (1984)
- The Wild East (1986)
- Algazara (1987)
- Zerenade (1989)
- Tuku Tuku (1991)
- Terra Nova (1993)
- Ave Maria (1996)
- Laula sinäkin (1998)
- Kalevala Spirit (2000)
- Sillat (2002)
- Laulu laineilla (2003)
- Kalabalik (2006)
- Koli (2010)
- Ilo (2012)
- Juju (2018)
- Hali (2019)

=== Live albums and compilations ===
- Piirpauke Live (1978)
- Historia of Piirpauke Vol. 1 (1978)
- Live in der Balver Höhle (1981)
- Soi vienosti murheeni soitto (1982)
- Live in Europe (1983)
- Global Servisi (1990)
- Metamorphosis (Live 1977–1995) (1995)
- Ikiliikkuja – Perpeetum Mobile (2004)

TÜRLÜ -live 1988 with Jukka Tolonen
