= Cherno (album) =

Studio album by KYPCK
- Released: 12 March 2008
- Recorded: Novaya Zemlya, Colibri, Tonebox
- Genres: Doom metal, gothic metal, sludge metal
- Length: 54:16
- Language: Russian
- Labels: UHO Production, Century Media
- Producer: Kai H. M. Hiilesmaa

KYPCK chronology
Cherno (2008)	Nizhe (2011)

Singles from Черно
- 1. "1917" Released: 2008

Professional ratings
Review scores
Source	Rating
AllMusic	(positive)
Desibeli.net	3.5/5 stars
Imperiumi.net	8.5/10 stars

Cherno (Cyrillic: Черно; Russian for "black") is the debut studio album by Finnish doom metal band KYPCK, released on 12 March 2008 by UHO Production.

== Track listing ==
No.	Title	Lyrics	Music	Length
1.	"Gidrolokator (Depth Finder)" (instrumental)	-	K. H. M. Hiilesmaa	1:48
2.	"Rozhdestvo v Murmanske (Christmas in Murmansk)"	E. Seppänen	S. Lopakka	4:51
3.	"Predatel (Traitor)"	E. Seppänen	E. Seppänen, S. Lopakka	5:38
4.	"1917"	E. Seppänen	K. H. M. Hiilesmaa	4:59
5.	"Chernaya Dyra (The Black Hole)"	E. Seppänen, S. Lopakka	S. Lopakka	8:44
6.	"Stalingrad"	E. Seppänen	J. T. Ylä-Rautio	5:11
7.	"Ne Prosti (Do Not Forgive)"	E. Seppänen	E. Seppänen, S. Lopakka	5:22
8.	"Ocherednye (The Usual)"	E. Seppänen	J. T. Ylä-Rautio	4:16
9.	"Odin Den iz Zhizni Yegora Kuznetsova (One Day in the Life of Yegor Kuznetsov)"	E. Seppänen, S. Lopakka	K. H. M. Hiilesmaa	5:38
10.	"Demon"	E. Seppänen	S. Lopakka	7:49
Total length:				54:16

== Personnel ==
- E. Seppänen – vocals
- S. S. Lopakka – guitar
- J. T. Ylä-Rautio – bass
- K. H. M. Hiilesmaa – drums
