= Taneli Jarva =

Finnish musician (born 1975)

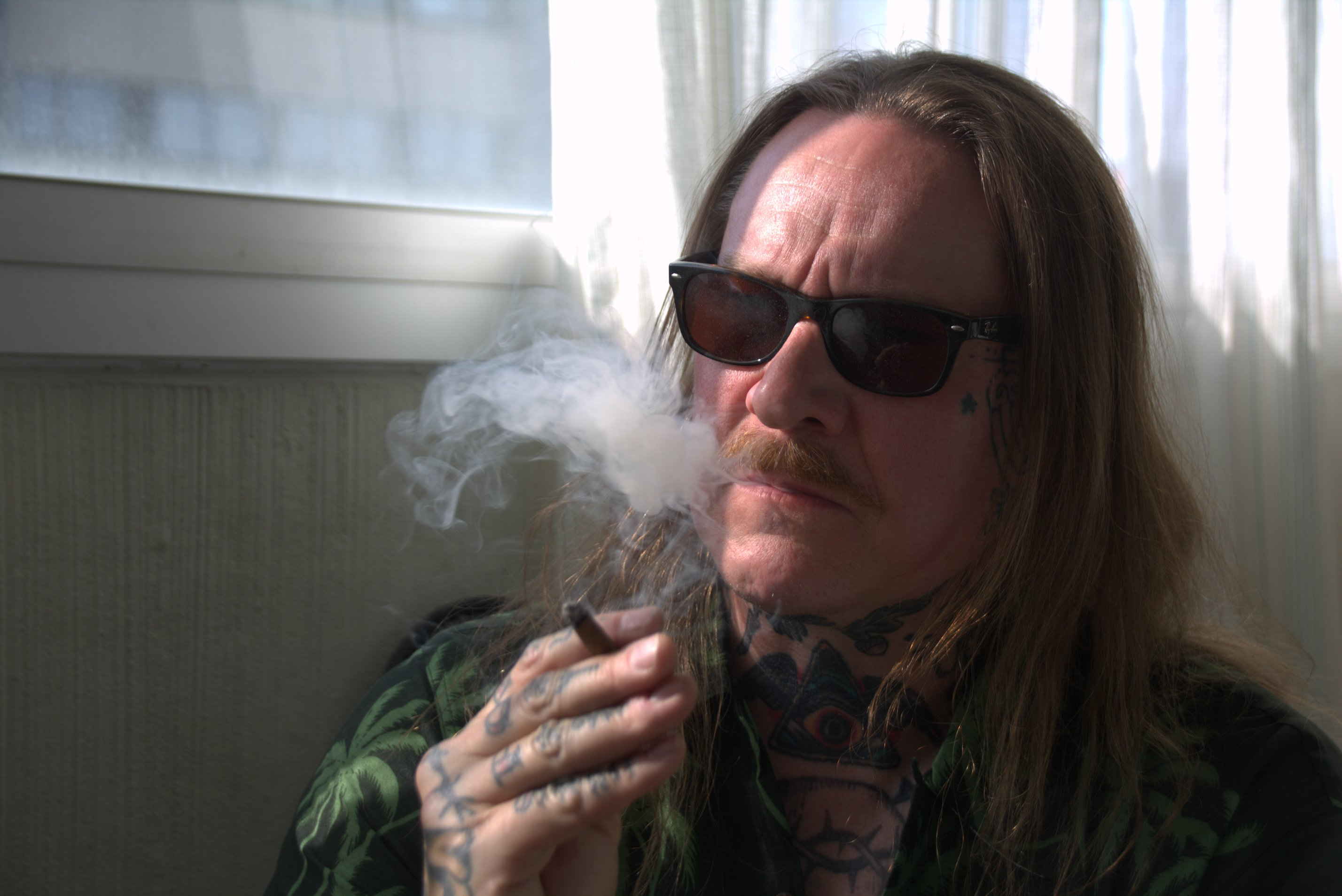
- (Photo by Mirko Luparelli)

Background information
- Born: 4 January 1975 (age 51); Oulu, Finland
- Genres: Extreme metal, hard rock, death metal, black metal, folk noir, alt-country, doom metal
- Occupations: Musician, tattoo artist
- Instruments: Bass guitar, vocals, guitar
- Years active: 1991–present
- Member of: Poison Whisky, T. Jarva & The Dark Place, Friends of Hell (Band)
- Formerly of: Sentenced, Impaled Nazarene, The Black League, Chaosbreed, Napoleons, Diavolos

Taneli Jarva (born 4 January 1975 in Oulu, Finland) is a Finnish musician and tattoo artist known for his work across the extreme metal and hard rock genres. His career is characterized by his involvement in numerous Finnish and international bands, serving primarily as a vocalist, bassist, and songwriter. His discography spans over three decades, notably featuring a transition from death metal to traditional rock and roll.

== Musical career ==
=== Sentenced (1991–1995) ===
Jarva joined the Finnish metal band Sentenced in 1991, initially as the bassist. His first major release with the band was their 1991 debut album Shadows of the Past. He contributed bass, backing vocals, and songwriting to several tracks, in addition to drawing the artwork for the 1995 reissue of the album.

On the 1993 album North from Here, he assumed the role of lead vocalist while continuing to contribute bass and songwriting. His final major releases with Sentenced were the Amok album and the Love and Death EP, both released in 1995. Jarva departed from the group in 1995 due to creative differences regarding the band's shift toward a more melodic sound.

=== Impaled Nazarene (1992–1996) ===
Jarva served as the bass player for the Oulu-based black metal band Impaled Nazarene from 1992 to 1996. His tenure overlapped with his time in Sentenced. During this period, he contributed to albums such as Ugra-Karma (1993) and Suomi Finland Perkele (1994). On the latter, he was credited under the pseudonym “The Fuck You-Man”.

=== The Black League (1998–2014) and Poison Whisky (2018–2019) ===
Following his departure from Sentenced, Jarva founded the hard rock band The Black League in 1998, serving as the lead vocalist. The band adopted a hard rock sound incorporating elements of "traditional rock 'n' roll," marking a stylistic shift from his earlier extreme metal work. The band released five studio albums between 2000 and 2009, before Jarva ended the project in October 2014, citing a "lack of personal inspiration".

Poison Whisky, established in the mid-2010s, served as a significant continuation of Jarva’s focus on hard-edged rock. He performed vocals and bass, collaborating with former The Black League guitarist Maike Valanne. The band released the albums Poison Whisky (2018) and Enter the Meatgrinder (2019).

=== T. Jarva & The Dark Place (2018–Present) ===
The collaboration between Taneli Jarva and guitarist Sami Hassinen, which serves as the foundation for T. Jarva & The Dark Place, began in late 2018, with the band established that year. The project operates in the folk noir and alt-country genres, built around Jarva's baritone vocals and steel-string guitar, in dialogue with Hassinen's melodic nylon-string playing.

After two years of performing covers by artists such as Nick Cave and Tom Waits, the duo began writing original material in 2020. The band released their debut album, Post Festum, in February 2024, preceded by singles including "Golden Girl," "Venus Is High," and "Can't Let Go". They followed this with the single "Still & Cold" in January 2025. The band is scheduled to release their second record, In a Dark Place, in spring 2026.

The current expanded lineup features drummer Sami Käyhkö, double bassist Ari Lampinen, keyboardist Janne Immonen, and backing vocalists Riina Rinkinen, Hanna Wendelin, and Tarja Leskinen.

=== Other collaborations (1996–2022) ===
Jarva remained active in various collaborative and specialized projects following the conclusion of The Black League in 2014, demonstrating continuous involvement in the Finnish rock and metal scenes.

- Chaosbreed: This included a stint as the vocalist for Chaosbreed from 2003 to 2005.
- Napoleons: In the 2010s, he contributed to the band Napoleons, providing bass and backing vocals (sometimes as "T-Bone Jarvis") on the EPs First Feces (2010) and A Good Life (2013), and the album The Final Submission (2015).
- Diavolos: He was the bassist for Diavolos on their 2015 album You Lived Now Die.
- Then Came Bronson: He was the bassist for Then Came Bronson on an unreleased 2016 album.
- Pussies: Furthermore, he worked as the live bassist for Pussies from 2019 to 2022.
- Friends of Hell: Jarva's collaborative efforts also extended to the international doom metal supergroup Friends of Hell (Band), where he played bass on two full-length albums: the self-titled debut (Friends of Hell, 2022) and God Damned You to Hell (2024).

== Tattooing career ==
Parallel to his career in music, Taneli Jarva established himself as a professional tattoo artist, accumulating more than 20 years of experience in the field. He began learning the craft in 2002 and started operating commercially in the Helsinki area by 2006. Notable studios where he worked include One Eye Tattoo (2008–2013) and Tatuata (2013–2021).

Jarva currently works from his private studio in Kerava, Finland, while also undertaking occasional guest spots and conventions. His preferred styles include traditional “old school” tattooing, the Japanese style, darker motifs, and music-related tattoos.

== Discography ==
| Year | Band | Title | Type | Role / Notes |
|---|---|---|---|---|
| 1991 | Sentenced | Shadows of the Past | Album | Lyrics, bass, backing vocals |
| 1992 | Sentenced | Journey to Pohjola | Demo | Bass, backing vocals, lyrics |
| 1993 | Sentenced | North from Here | Album | Lead vocals, bass, songwriting, lyrics |
| 1993 | Impaled Nazarene | Sadogoat | Single | Bass |
| 1993 | Impaled Nazarene | Satanic Masowhore | Single | Bass |
| 1993 | Impaled Nazarene | Tol Cormpt Norz Norz Norz | Album | Session bassist |
| 1993 | Impaled Nazarene | Ugra-Karma | Album | Bass |
| 1994 | Sentenced | The Trooper | EP | Vocals, bass, lyrics |
| 1994 | Impaled Nazarene | Suomi Finland Perkele | Album | Bass (as "The Fuck You-Man") |
| 1995 | Sentenced | Amok | Album | Vocals, bass, keyboards, songwriting, lyrics |
| 1995 | Sentenced | Love & Death | EP | Vocals, bass, songwriting, lyrics |
| 1996 | Impaled Nazarene | Motörpenis | Single | Bass |
| 1996 | Impaled Nazarene | Latex Cult | Album | Bass (as "Jarva") |
| 1997 | Sentenced | Story – Greatest Kills | Comp. | Bass, lyrics (selected tracks) |
| 2000 | The Black League | Ichor | Album | Vocals, additional instruments, lyrics (as "T. Jarva") |
| 2001 | The Black League | Utopia A.D. | Album | Vocals, lyrics |
| 2001 | The Black League | Doomsday Sun | EP | Vocals, additional instruments, lyrics |
| 2003 | Chaosbreed | Unleashed Carnage | EP | Vocals |
| 2003 | The Black League | Cold Women & Warm Beer | Single | Vocals |
| 2004 | Chaosbreed | Brutal | Album | Vocals |
| 2004 | Chaosbreed | Chaosbreed / Rytmihäiriö | Split | Vocals |
| 2004 | The Black League | Man's Ruin Revisited | Album | Vocals |
| 2005 | The Black League | A Place Called Bad | Album | Vocals, lyrics |
| 2008 | Sentenced | The Glow of 1000 Suns / Amok Run | Single | Bass, vocals, lyrics |
| 2009 | The Black League | Ghost Brothel | Album | Vocals |
| 2010 | Napoleons | First Feces | EP | Backing vocals |
| 2013 | Napoleons | A Good Life | EP | Bass, backing vocals (as "T-Bone Jarvis") |
| 2015 | Napoleons | The Final Submission | Album | Bass, backing vocals |
| 2015 | Diavolos | You Lived Now Die | Album | Bass |
| 2016 | Then Came Bronson | Unreleased Album | Album | Bass |
| 2018 | Poison Whisky | Poison Whisky | Album | Vocals, bass |
| 2019 | Poison Whisky | Enter the Meatgrinder | Album | Vocals, bass |
| 2022 | Friends of Hell (Band) | Friends of Hell | Album | Bass |
| 2024 | Friends of Hell | God Damned You to Hell | Album | Bass |
| 2024 | T. Jarva & The Dark Place | Post Festum | Album | Vocals, guitar, lyrics |
| 2025 | T. Jarva & The Dark Place | Still And Cold | Single | Vocals, guitar, lyrics |
