= Sakari Kukko =

Finnish musician

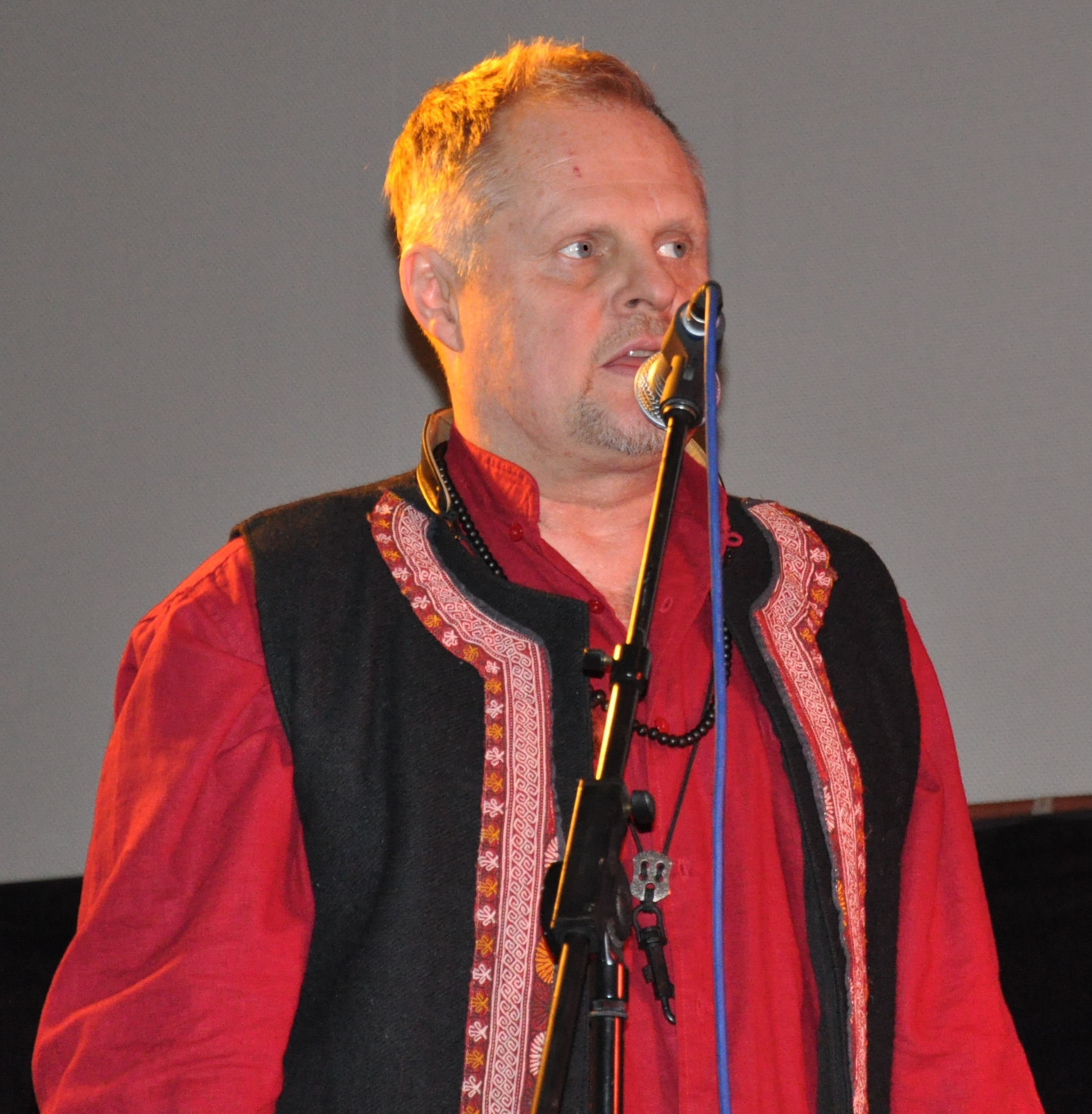
- Sakari Kukko

Background information
- Also known as: Sakke
- Born: Jyrki Sakari Kukko; 8 July 1953 (age 72)
- Origin: Kajaani, Finland
- Genres: World, Jazz, Gospel, Other
- Occupations: Singer, musician, composer
- Years active: 1958–present
- Label: Rockadillo Records
- Website: http://www.sakarikukko.com

Jyrki Sakari Kukko (born 8 July 1953, Kajaani, Finland) is a Finnish musician.

== Career ==
Kukko started his career in the early 1960s as a singer participating in several singing contests and performing in radio stations, TV programs and other venues. At the age of 7, He began taking piano lessons. Soon after that he started to play also guitar and flute, and later saxophone. In the mid-1960s, He started forming bands. He constructed a school band, playing mainly rock and roll, but soon after that he formed a group of local dance bands.

He embarked his career by playing with other musicians like Kajaani Big Band (1969–1972), Kisu & Uniset (1970–1971), Markku Suominen's Monopol (1970–1971), Tapiola Big Band (1972–1974), Oulunkylä Big Band (1972–1974), Maarit & Afrikan Tähti (1972–1973), Kalevala (1972–1973), SIMO Big Band (pre-UMO)(1972–1973), Jukka Tolonen's band (1973–1974), Heikki Sarmanto's band (1979), Sensation Band of Addis Ababa (1976), Mahmoud Ahmed's Ibex Band (1976), Etoile de Dakar (1979), Espoo Big Band (1990), Samuli Mikkonen & 7 henkeä (2003), Kingston Wall (1992–1994), Amorphis (1999–2001), Pori Jazz All Stars, Okay Temiz (several different bands 1992–2008) and so on. He founded the group Piirpauke in 1974.

Apart from that, he performed with other artists like Aladji Faye, Tilahun Gessesse, Youssou Ndour, John McLaughlin, Pat Metheny, Bob Mose, Lester Bowie, David Schnitter, Polo Orti, Aster Aweke, Rainer Bruninghaus, Jakob Magnusson, Jon Eberson, Stefan Nilsson, Anders Kjellberg, Zakir Hussain, Ivo Papasoff, Ran Diallo, Ismaila Sané, Finn Siegler, Baluji Shrivastav, Charlie Mariano, Thad Jones, Gunter Christmann, Paquito d'Rivera, Ted Curson, Walter Bishop Jr., Herbie Hanckock's Head Hunters, Marian Petrescu, Zoltan Lantos, Mihail Petrescu, Kornel Horvath, Borbely Mihaly, Wladislaw Jagiello, Wojeck Tschaikowsky, Hamid Drake, Bill Öhrström, Coste Apetrea, Bruno Råberg, Richie Cole, Raivo Tafenau, Hüsnü Şenlendirici, Ergun Senlenderici, Jimi Mbaye, Yamar Thiam, Orchestra Baobab, No. 1 de Dakar, Super Diamono de Dakar, Ethio Stars, Assane Thiam, Eric M'backe-N'doye, Alla Seck, Ali Birra, Mike Rose, Antonio Coronel, Pepe Roca, Alameda, Juan Carlos Romero, Niño Miguel, Husnu Senlenderici and numerous Finnish musicians.

Kukko represented YLE (Finnish broadcasting company) in the EBU Big Band in Sarajevo (1976) and participated in many radio and festival big bands which anticipated the UMO Big Band. In the early 1970s, Kukko worked as a studio-musician and performed as a freelancer with the Helsinki Philharmonic Orchestra, Finnish Radio Symphony Orchestra (RSO), and the Finnish National Opera.

Kukko composed music for his own bands, EBB, Koiton Laulu and several films and theaters.

Since 1974, Piirpauke has been Kukko's main project. The band has given hundreds of concerts in almost 40 countries in countless festivals and other venues.

== Studies ==
- Kukko's piano teachers: Anni Helasvuo (1960–1962), Arvi Tuomi (1969), Ossi Säily (1969–1971) (Kajaani Musik-School), Kirsi Tavastjerna (1972–1973) (Sibelius-Akademy) & Mervi Kianto (1973–1974) Sibelius-Akademy)
- Kukko's flute teachers: Jorma Joensuu (1965–1970), Olli Ruottinen (1969), Pekka Pöyry (1969), & Ilari Lehtinen (1972–1974) (Sibelius-Academy)
- Kukko's saxophone teachers: Hannu Sovelius (1969), Pekka Pöyry (1969) & Asser Sipilä (1972–1974) (Sibelius-Academy)
- Kukko's jazz-theory/composing teachers: Otto Donner(1969), Tapani Tamminen(1972–1973), Edward Vesala (1972–1974)

== Awards ==
- Suomen Jazzliiton George Award (1976)
- KTL:n (Kultturityöntekijäin Liitto) Award for Piirpauke (1977)
- Oulun läänin Artist Award (2002)
- Kajaani City Culture Award (2004)
- Golden Gospel Award (2009)
- Erikois-Emma (2014)

== Artistic leadership ==
- Ristijärven Veisuuvestivaali (2004–2010)

== Discography ==
=== Solo albums ===
- Kajastus (1979)
- Moonlight Caravan with Espoo Big Band (1989)
- Virret (2001)
- Joulu (2003)
- Soi Kiitos (2009)
- Valo (2013)
- JouLumo (2017)

=== As sideman ===
- With Edward Vesala
- Nan Madol (JAPO, 1974)
