= The Black League =

Finnish heavy metal band

Background information
- Origin: Oulu, Finland
- Genres: Heavy metal; rock
- Years active: 1998–2014
- Labels: Spinefarm; Wolfgang
- Members: Taneli Jarva; Heavy Hiltunen; Maike Valanne; Ilkka Tanska; Rale Tilainen
- Past members: Alexi Ranta; Mikko "Florida" Laurila; Kimmo "Sir" Luttinen

The Black League was a Finnish heavy metal band. They were formed in 1998 by Taneli Jarva, three years after his departure from the gothic metal band Sentenced. The Black League's first two full-lengths carry on the spirit from Taneli's work with his former band, seasoning their metal with elements of traditional rock 'n' roll. On their third release, Man's Ruin Revisited, these influences take an even more prominent role in their sound. In October 2014, Taneli Jarva pronounced of his decision to call the band the quits due to "lack of personal inspiration".

== Band members ==
- Taneli Jarva – lead vocals (1998–2014)
- Maike Valanne – rhythm guitar, backing vocals (1998–2014)
- Heavy Hiltunen – lead guitar (2005–2014)
- Ilkka Tanska – bass (2005–2014)
- Rale Tiiainen – drums (2005–2014)

=== Previous members ===
- Alexi Ranta – lead guitar (1998–2005)
- Mikko Laurila (a.k.a. Florida) – bass (1998–2005)
- Kimmo Luttinen (a.k.a. Sir Luttinen) – drums (1998–2005)

=== Session members ===
- Lene Leinonen – bass (live 2004)

== Discography ==
=== Demos ===
- Demo 98 (1998)

=== Singles ===
- Cold Women & Warm Beer (2003)

=== EPs ===
- Doomsday Sun (2001)

=== Albums ===
- Ichor (2000)
- Utopia A.D. (2001)
- Man's Ruin Revisited (2004)
- A Place Called Bad (2005)
- Ghost Brothel (2009)

== Videography ==
- Winter Winds Sing (2000)
- Rex Talionis (2002)
- Same Ol' Fuckery (2005)
- The Pusher (2007)
- The Beast Is a Riddle (2009)
