= Lust Stained Despair =

Studio album by Poisonblack
- Released: 22 August 2006
- Genre: Heavy metal, gothic metal
- Length: 48:12
- Label: Century Media

Poisonblack chronology
Escapexstacy (2003)	Lust Stained Despair (2006)	A Dead Heavy Day (2008)

Professional ratings
Review scores
Source	Rating
About.com	(4/5)
AllMusic	3/5 stars

Lust Stained Despair is the second album by the Finnish gothic metal band Poisonblack. Provisionally titled The Music for the Junkies by Poisonblack frontman Ville Laihiala, the album was released in August 2006 after a three-year hiatus due to the search for a new singer (after the departure of Juha-Pekka Leppäluoto).

== Track listing ==
All songs written by Ville Laihiala, except where noted.

1. "Nothing Else Remains" – 3:55
2. "Hollow Be My Name" – 4:43
3. "The Darkest Lie" – 4:35 (Laihiala/Janne Markus)
4. "Rush" – 4:06
5. "Nail" – 4:47
6. "Raivotar" – 4:55 (Janne Kukkonen/Laihiala)
7. "Soul in Flames" – 4:23
8. "Pain Becomes Me" – 4:07
9. "Never Enough" – 4:15
10. "Love Controlled Despair" – 3:51
11. "The Living Dead" – 4:35
12. "Bleeding into You" – 3:19 (bonus track for limited edition release)

== Production ==
- Mixed, engineered and mastered by Tue Madsen
