= Drive (Poisonblack album) =

Studio album by Poisonblack
- Released: 27 April 2011
- Recorded: January–February 2011
- Studio: Antfarm Studio, Arhus, Denmark
- Genre: Gothic metal, gothic rock, hard rock, heavy metal
- Label: Hype
- Producer: Tue Madsen

Poisonblack chronology
Of Rust and Bones (2010)	Drive (2011)	Lyijy (2013)

Professional ratings
Review scores
Source	Rating
Hallowed	4/7
Melodic	2.5/5
Metal.de	8/10

Drive is the fifth studio album by the Finnish gothic metal band Poisonblack. It was released on 27 April 2011 in Europe by Hype Records. A single was released for the track "Scars".

== Track listing ==
All music and lyrics by Laihiala. All arrangements by Laihiala/Kanerva/Remes.

1. "Piston Head" – 4:05
2. "Mercury Falling" – 4:07
3. "A Good Day for the Crows" – 4:24
4. "Maggot Song" – 3:48
5. "From Now-Here to Nowhere" – 6:10
6. "Sycophant" – 3:49
7. "The Dead-End Stream" – 3:29
8. "Futile Man" – 6:21
9. "Scars" – 5:07
10. "Driftwood" – 3:29
11. "Them Footsteps Echo" – 2:44 (bonus track for Japan)
12. "The Ball and Chain" – 4:50 (bonus track for Japan)

== Personnel ==
Poisonblack

- Ville Laihiala – guitar, vocals
- Tarmo Kanerva – drums
- Antti Remes – bass
- Marco Sneck – keyboards

Session musician

- Anette Euesgaard – background vocals (tracks 1, 3 and 7)

Production

- Tue Madsen – recording, mastering & engineering
