= Konevitsan kirkonkellot =

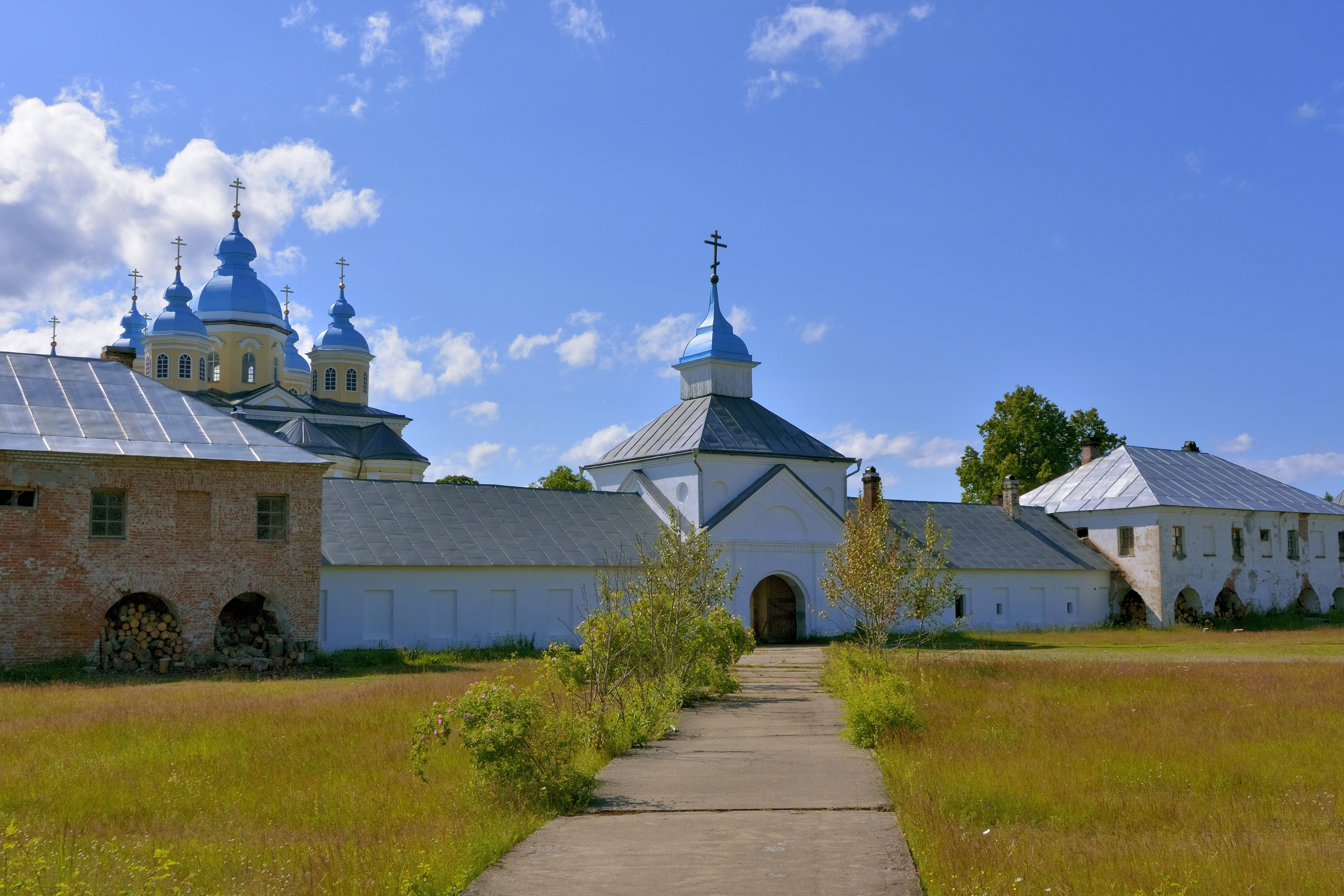
Konevitsa Monastery

"Konevitsan kirkonkellot" (English: "The Church Bells of Konevitsa") is a Karelian folk melody, best known as the 1975 recording of Finnish musical group Piirpauke. It repeats the chime of the church bells of the Konevsky Monastery (Konevitsan luostari in Finnish) in Lake Ladoga. The melody was first recorded by kantele player Ulla Katajavuori in 1952. Other recorded versions include the 1978 version by Matti Kontio, Martti Pokela and Eeva-Leena Sariola, and the 2002 version by heavy metal band Sentenced, used as an intro in their album The Cold White Light.

== The Piirpauke version ==
"Konevitsan kirkonkellot"

Song by Piirpauke

from the album Piirpauke
- Released: 1975
- Recorded: 1975
- Genre: Folk melody
- Length: 5 minutes
- Label: Love records

Piirpauke's "Konevitsan kirkonkellot" was released in their 1975 debut album Piirpauke. The song is composed of two parts of the original theme with an improvised part in the middle. The improvised part is known of the classic guitar solo by Hasse Walli. French horn was played by 17-year-old music student Esa-Pekka Salonen, who later became a famous conductor.

Live versions are included in Piirpauke's albums Historia of Piirpauke Vol. 1 (1977) and Metamorphosis – Live 1977–1995 (1995).
