= Vesa Ranta =

Finnish drummer (born 1973)

- Born: 20 July 1973 (age 52)
- Genres: Death metal, melodic death metal, heavy metal
- Occupation: Drummer

Vesa Ranta (born 20 July 1973) is a Finnish drummer. He was one of the original members of the metal bands Sentenced and The Man-Eating Tree. He is also a fine art photographer and was owner of the Nuclear Nightclub live music club and bar in downtown Oulu. In 2024, he joined Cemetery Skyline and he produced a single called Violent Storm.

== Discography ==
=== Studio albums ===
- Shadows of the Past by Sentenced (1991)
- North from Here by Sentenced (1993)
- Amok by Sentenced (1995)
- Down by Sentenced (1996)
- Frozen by Sentenced (1998)
- Crimson by Sentenced (2000)
- The Cold White Light by Sentenced (2002)
- The Funeral Album by Sentenced (2005)
- Vine by The Man Eating Tree (2010)
- Harvest by The Man Eating Tree (2011)
- In the Absence of Light by The Man Eating Tree (2015)
- Nordic Gothic by Cemetery Skyline (2024)

=== EPs ===
- The Trooper (1993)
- Love & Death (1995)

=== Live album ===
- Buried Alive (2 discs, 2006)

=== DVDs ===
- Buried Alive (2 discs, 2006)

=== Singles ===
- Killing Me Killing You (1999)
- No One There (2002)
- Ever-Frost (2005)
- Despair Ridden Hearts (2005)
- Violent Storm (2024)

=== Compilation ===
- Story: A Recollection (1997)

=== Demos ===
- When Death Joins Us... (1990)
- Rotting Ways to Misery (1991)
- Journey to Pohjola (1992)
- Demo 1994 (1994)

=== Split albums ===
- Cronology of Death (1991)
- promo split MCD (2005)
