= Lyijy =

Studio album by Poisonblack
- Released: 13 September 2013
- Recorded: January–June 2013
- Studios: Sonic Pump studio, Helsinki and Victory Audio studio, Kokkola
- Genres: Heavy metal, gothic metal, hard rock
- Label: Warner Music Finland
- Producer: Jonas Olsson

Poisonblack chronology
Drive (2011)	Lyijy (2013)

Professional ratings
Review scores
Source	Rating
Be Subjective!	4/5
Imperiumi.net	8/10
KaaosZine	8.5/10
Rock Review	3/5

Lyijy (Finnish for "Lead") is the sixth and final studio album by Finnish gothic metal band Poisonblack, released on 13 September 2013. Music videos were released for the tracks "Home Is Where the Sty Is" and "Down the Ashes Rain".

== Track listing ==
1. "Home Is Where the Sty Is" – 3:35
2. "Down the Ashes Rain" – 3:53
3. "The Flavor of the Month" – 3:57
4. "The Absentee" – 4:46
5. "Maybe Life Is Not for Everyone" – 5:32
6. "Death by the Blues" – 3:41
7. "The Halfway Bar" – 5:38
8. "Them Walls" – 4:12
9. "Blackholehead" – 3:39
10. "Pull the Trigger" – 5:23
11. "Elämän kevät" – 6:07
12. "How Low Can You Go" – 2:53 (bonus track for Japan)

== Personnel ==
=== Poisonblack ===
- Ville Laihiala – guitar, vocals
- Tarmo Kanerva – drums
- Antti Remes – bass
- Marco Sneck – keyboards
