= A Dead Heavy Day =

Studio album by Poisonblack
- Released: 1 September 2008
- Genre: Heavy metal, gothic metal
- Label: Century Media

Poisonblack chronology
Lust Stained Despair (2006)	A Dead Heavy Day (2008)	Of Rust and Bones (2010)

A Dead Heavy Day is the third studio album by the Finnish gothic metal band Poisonblack. It was released on 1 September 2008 by Century Media Records.

== Track listing ==
No.	Title	Length
1.	"Introuder"	0:31
2.	"Diane"	3:57
3.	"Left Behind"	4:45
4.	"Bear the Cross"	3:50
5.	"A Dead Heavy Day"	5:07
6.	"Me, Myself & I"	4:31
7.	"X"	6:01
8.	"Human-Compost"	5:24
9.	"The Days Between"	6:02
10.	"Hatelove"	4:01
11.	"Lowlife"	4:28
12.	"Only You Can Tear Me Apart"	7:46

Japanese edition bonus track
No.	Title	Length
13.	"The Living Dead" (Semi-Acoustic Live)

Digital bonus tracks
No.	Title	Length
13.	"Soldier of Fortune" (Semi-Acoustic Live)
14.	"Dream On" (Semi-Acoustic Live)

=== Digipak limited edition bonus DVD ===
- Making of A Dead Heavy Day
- Live at Gloria, Oulu, for Radio Mega, 27 March 2008, semi acoustic:

No.	Title	Length
1.	"The Glow of the Flames"	4:19
2.	"The Kiss of Death"	4:38
3.	"A Dead Heavy Day"	4:59
4.	"Nail"	4:59
5.	"Pain Becomes Me"	3:44
6.	"In Lust"	5:08
7.	"X"	5:05

- Rush video-clip

== Band members ==
- Ville Laihiala – lead vocals, guitars
- Janne Markus – guitars
- Marco Sneck – keyboards
- Antti Remes – bass
- Tarmo Kanerva – drums
