= Down (Sentenced album) =

Studio album by Sentenced
- Released: 11 November 1996
- Genre: Gothic metal
- Length: 41:28
- Label: Century Media
- Producer: Waldemar Sorychta

Sentenced chronology
Amok (1995)	Down (1996)	Frozen (1998)

Professional ratings
Review scores
Source	Rating
AllMusic	4.5/5 stars

Down is the fourth album by the Finnish metal band Sentenced, released in November 1996 via Century Media. It is also the first album including the vocalist Ville Laihiala. This album is the band's first pure gothic metal album.

== Track listing ==
No.	Title	Lyrics	Music	Length
1.	"Intro – The Gate"	(instrumental)	Miika Tenkula	1:21
2.	"Noose"	Sami Lopakka	Tenkula	4:01
3.	"Shadegrown"	Lopakka	Tenkula	4:36
4.	"Bleed"	Lopakka	Tenkula	3:40
5.	"Keep My Grave Open"	Lopakka	Lopakka	3:53
6.	"Crumbling Down (Give Up Hope)"	Lopakka	Tenkula	5:26
7.	"Sun Won't Shine"	Lopakka	Tenkula	4:16
8.	"Ode to the End"	Ville Laihiala, Lopakka	Tenkula	5:20
9.	"0132"	(instrumental)	Tenkula	1:42
10.	"Warrior of Life (Reaper Redeemer)"	Lopakka	Tenkula	3:41
11.	"I'll Throw the First Rock"	Lopakka, Laihiala	Tenkula	3:25

2007 reissue bonus track

No.	Title	Length
12.	"No Tomorrow"	4:34

== Credits ==
- Ville Laihiala – vocals
- Miika Tenkula – guitar, bass
- Sami Lopakka – guitar
- Vesa Ranta – drums

Guest musicians

- Waldemar Sorychta – keyboards
- Birgit Zacher – backing vocals
- Vorph (of Samael) – growl vocals on "Bleed", "Keep My Grave Open" and "Warrior of Life (Reaper Redeemer)"
