= Ulla Katajavuori =

Finnish kantele player (1909–2001)

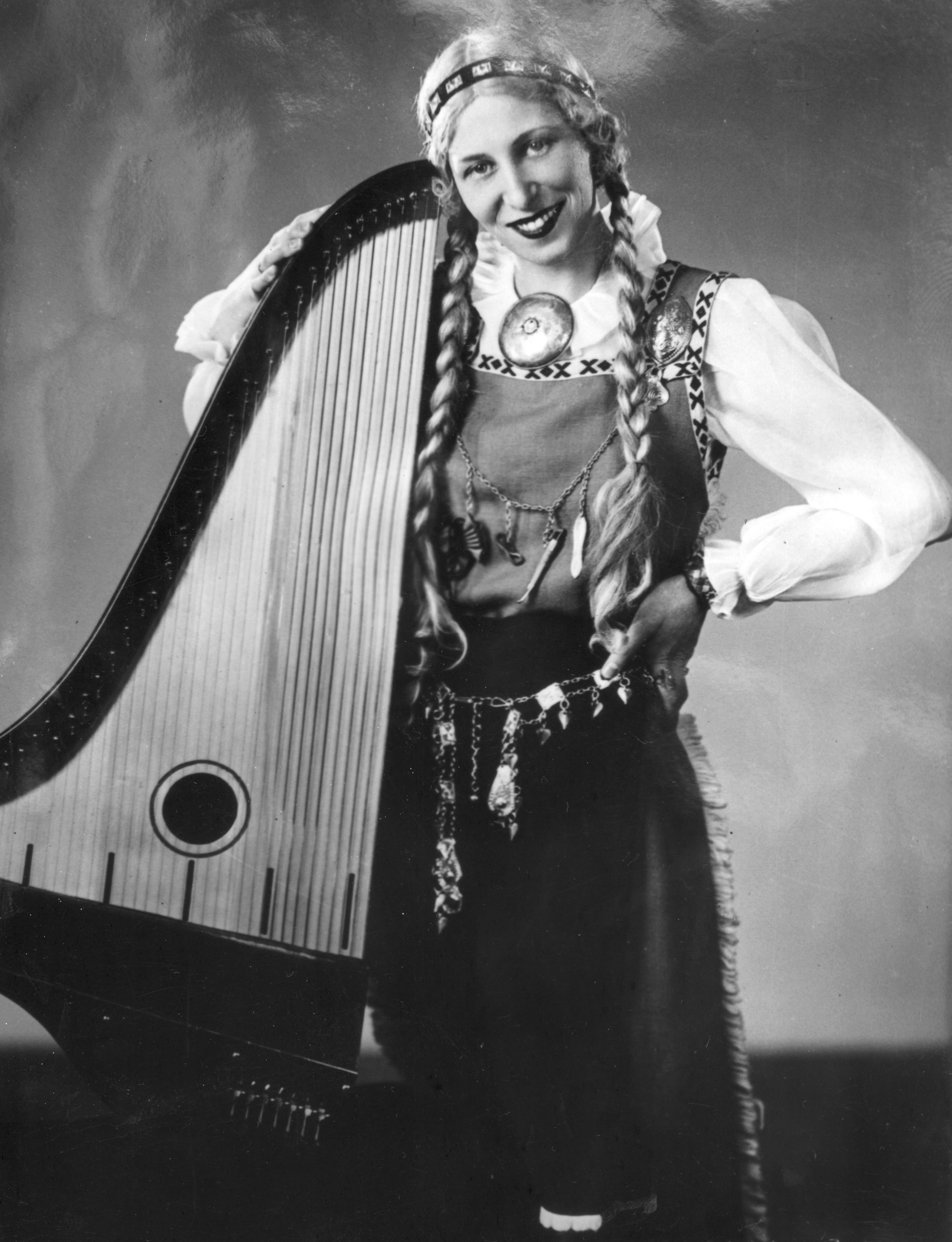
Katajavuori in the 1930s

Ulla Kyllikki Katajavuori-Koskimies (16 June 1909 in Rauma — 5 October 2001 in Helsinki) was a Finnish musician who played the traditional Finnish kantele, performing from the 1930s to the 1990s. One of her recordings is the Karelian folk song Konevitsan kirkonkellot.

Katajavuori played the modern, multi-stringed version of the kantele, and was considered a virtuoso and maintainer of the tradition, especially during the 1960s when the instrument was of low popularity, and 5-string player Martti Pokela was one of the few other recognised musicians playing the instrument.

== Discography ==
- Ulla Katajavuori: Grand Lady of Kantele. IMU-CD 101

== Sources ==
- Helistö, Paavo: Ulla Katajavuori — kanteletar. Radio programme. Yle Radio 1, 2000.
- Helistö, Paavo: Ulla Katajavuori, kanteleen runoilija. Friiti 2/2000.
- Koskimies, Satu: Kanteleen Grand Lady. Kantele 4/2000.
