= Escapexstacy =

Studio album by Poisonblack
- Released: 17 February 2003
- Recorded: 2002
- Studio: Neo Studios
- Genre: Gothic metal
- Length: 44:23
- Label: Century Media Records
- Producer: Ville Laihiala and Janne Kukkonen

Poisonblack chronology
Escapexstacy (2003)	Lust Stained Despair (2006)

Professional ratings
Review scores
Source	Rating
AllMusic	link
Metal Glory	(not rated) link

Escapexstacy is the debut album of Finnish gothic metal band Poisonblack. It was released on 17 February 2003 in Germany, 25 February 2003 in the United States and Canada, and 8 March 2003 in Japan. Amy Sciarretto gave a favourable review in CMJ New Music Monthly, writing that "Escapexstacy boasts gorgeous and progressive Euro-rock, which never gets too heavy..."

The song "The Exciter" was featured in an episode of Viva la Bam, entitled "Where's Vito?", during a scene where Vito Margera destroys Bam Margera's beloved Hummer via being pushed into a quarry.

== Track listing ==
1. "The Glow of the Flames"– 2:51
2. "Love Infernal"– 3:57
3. "The State"– 4:56
4. "All Else Is Hollow"– 4:02
5. "In Lust"– 5:30
6. "The Exciter"– 4:29
7. "Lay Your Heart to Rest"– 4:24
8. "With Her I Die"– 5:20
9. "Illusion/Delusion"– 4:24
10. "The Kiss of Death"– 4:32

== Personnel ==
- Juha-Pekka Leppäluoto – vocals
- Ville Laihiala – guitars
- Marco Sneck – keyboards
- Janne Kukkonen – bass
- Tarmo Kanerva – drums
