= Utopia A.D. =

Studio album by The Black League
- Released: 2001
- Recorded: Tico Tico Studio & Sound Mix Studio in June - August 2001
- Genre: Heavy metal
- Length: 59:59
- Label: Spinefarm Records
- Producer: Taneli Jarva

The Black League chronology
Ichor (2000)	Utopia A.D. (2001)	Man's Ruin Revisited (2004)

Professional ratings
Review scores
Source	Rating
Allmusic	2.5/5 stars

Utopia A.D. is The Black League's second full-length album, released in 2001 by Spinefarm Records. A music video was made of the song Rex Talionis.

== Track listing ==
1. "Transit Gloria Mundi" (Jarva et al.) - 2:41
2. "Empiria" (Jarva et al.) - 4:59
3. "Voice of God" (Valanne, Jarva et al.) - 3:23
4. "Day One" (Jarva et al.) - 5:18
5. "To Suffer & to Smile" (Florida, Jarva et al.) - 5:03
6. "Tedium Vitae" (Valanne, Jarva et al.) - 4:03
7. "Harbour of Hatred" (Jarva et al.) - 6:00
8. "The Everlasting, Part IV" (Jarva et al.) - 3:31
9. "Rex Talionis" (Luttinen, Jarva et al.) - 2:24
10. "Blueskymagic" (Luttinen, Valanne, Jarva et al.) - 4:47
11. "Citizen Cain" (Florida, Jarva et al.) - 4:00
12. "Alfa/Omega, the Desert Song" (Jarva et al.) - 4:02
13. "Utopia Anno Zero" (Ranta, Luttinen, Jarva et al.) - 9:49

All lyrics by Taneli Jarva.

== Personnel ==
- Taneli Jarva — Vocals
- Sir Luttinen — Drums
- Maike Valanne — Guitars
- Alexi Ranta — Guitars
- Florida — Bass guitar
- Mika Pohjola — Keyboards
- Jarkko Laiho — Percussion
