= Ismaila Sané =

Senegalese percussionist, singer, solo dancer, choreographer and pedagogue

Ismaila Sané (full name Ismaila Sané Badiane) is a Senegalese born percussionist, singer, solo dancer of African ballet, choreographer and pedagogue. He was born on January 4, 1956, in Coubalan, Casamance, Senegal). Sané lived in Spain from 1981 to 1999, and since 1999 he has made his home Finland. Sané is well known in Finland from his solo career but also from the bands Senfi, Galaxy and Piirpauke and in Spain from bands Baba Djembe and Mbalax.

== Prizes and grants ==
- Lempo of the Year 2003: The first emigrant who knowingly got the "citizen of the year" prize in Finland. The prize was given to Ismaila together with his wife, musician Outi Sané. (Home place Lempäälä)
- The Recognition Prize of Kalevala Koru Cultural Foundation in 2005. (Kalevala korun kulttuurisäätiön tunnustuspalkinto 2005.): Together with his wife, musician Outi Sané. For the multicultural and international work of the Sanés.
- Prize of Finland 2005, Ministry of Education of Finland: As a percussionist of the band Galaxy.
- Composition Working Grant, Georg Malmstén Foundation 2007, Finland.
- Working Grant - Music 2011, Arts Council of Pirkanmaa, Finland.
- Working Grant - Music 2011 Kalevala Koru Cultural Foundation, Finland. For composing and arranging children record for Senfi band (together with Outi Sane)
- Working Grant - Music 2012, Finnish Cultural Foundation, Central Fund, Finland.
- EOAW Cultural Achievements Award 2012. International Women Conference, Tampere, Finland.

== Artistic leadership ==
- Artistic leader of the education for music teachers in Opeko "Yhteinen sävel 1-3" at years 2004 - 2006. Head educator with Outi Sané.
- Artistic leader of the multicultural education for teachers in Opeko "Africa alive" year 2006. Head educator with Outi Sané.
- Artistic leader and the father of Ethno Music Festival "LempoFolk" 2005. Other leaders Outi Sané and Henna Leisiö.

== Work as a solo ballet dancer ==
- 1974 - 1978 Ballets Bougarabou (Dakar, Senegal) Tours: Mauritania, Morocco, France (Nizza, Cannes, Oloron, Confolens)
- 1979 - 1980 Ballets Africains (Dakar, Senegal) Tours: Ford de France (Antilles)
- In 1980 Ballets Mansour Gueye (Dakar, Senegal) tours France (Dijon), Spain (Circus Ringland and Circus Rudy Brothers)
- 1981 - 1989 Ballets Mansour Gueye (La Cueva Romantica2, Los Realejos, Tenerife, Spain)
- 1993 - 1995 Co-operation: Ballets Mansour Gueye (La Cueva Romantica2, Los Realejos, Tenerife, Spain)
- 1998 Berthelius Dance Company (La Laguna, Tenerife, Spain)

== Discography ==
=== Solo records ===
- Ismaila Sané: Ñamandu (1999) Azel Producciones, Tenerife, Spain.
- Ismaila Sané: Ñamandu (2002) Azel Producciones, Tenerife, Spain.

=== Music for movies and TV programs ===
- Muros (2003)

Direction: Josep M. Vilageliu. Production: Josep Vilageliu, Deimos Canarias Televisión and Ateneo de La Laguna. Tenerife, Spain.

- Amin kanssa series, Pikku Kakkonen (multicultural children series of music and games, broadcast 2002 and 2006)

=== Co-operation in other records ===
- 2011 Sakari Kukko & Humbalax: Paratiisi (Rockadillo Records)
- 2010 Piirpauke: Koli (Rockadillo Records) No: 1 on European World Music Charts
- 2008 Pasi Kaunisto & Piirpauke: Onnelliset - Oskar Merikannon Lauluja feat. Johanna Rusanen (FG-Naxos)
- 2006 Piirpauke: Kalabalik (Rockadillo Records)
- 2005 Piirpauke: Ikiliikkuja - perpetuum mobile - The very Best of P. (Rockadillo Records)
- 2003 Piirpauke: Laulu laineilla (Rockadillo Records)
- 2002 Piirpauke: Sillat (Rockadillo Records)
- 1998 Piirpauke: Laula sinäkin (Rockadillo Records)
- 1996 Piirpauke: Ave Maria (Rockadillo Records)
- 1994 Piirpauke: Metamorphosis (Rockadillo Records)
- 1993 Piirpauke: Terra Nova - Muuttolinnut (Rockadillo Records)
- 1991 Piirpauke: Tuku Tuku (Rockadillo Records)
- 2011 The Capital Beat: On the midnight wire (Stupido Records)
- 2006 Eero Koivistoinen Music Society: X-Ray
- 2005 Jaakko Löytty: Murhehuone (Humble records)
- 2003 Galaxy: Insecurité (Global Music Center)
- 2003 Jazzgangsters: Peace (Rockadillo Records)
- 2002 Galaxy: Sedde ja Insecurité (videos)
- 2000 Good People: Good People (Naxos)
- 1999 Al Farabi (Azel Producciones)
- 1999 Baba Djembe (Multitrac Records)
- 1998 Benito Cabrera: Notas de viajes
- 1998 Ghandara
- 1997 Antonio Hernandez: Ritual Suite (Azel Producciones)
- 1996 Chiqui Perez (Manzana Records)
- 1995 Taller Canario: Ahora que (Manzana Records)
- 1995 Las Ratas (Multitrac)
- 1994 M'balax: Kike Perdomo - M'balax (Manzana Records)
