= Taneli Siikaluoma =

Finnish ice hockey defenceman

- Born: April 23, 1994 (age 30); Muhos, Finland
- Height: 6 ft 0 in (183 cm)
- Weight: 179 lb (81 kg; 12 st 11 lb)
- Position: Defence
- Shoots: Left
- 2. Divisioona team; Former teams: KISE; Kärpät; Ilves
- Playing career: 2015–present

Taneli Siikaluoma (born April 23, 1994) is a Finnish ice hockey defenceman who is currently playing for KISE of the 2. Divisioona.

Siikalouma previously played in Liiga for Kärpät and Ilves, playing a total of 43 games without scoring a point. He also played in Mestis for Hokki, Hermes and IPK before joining KISE on September 25, 2019.
