= Ichor (album) =

Studio album by The Black League
- Released: 2000
- Recorded: Tico Tico Studio & LaLa Records in December 1999 - February 2000
- Genre: Heavy metal
- Length: 58:27
- Label: Spinefarm Records
- Producer: Taneli Jarva

The Black League chronology
Demo 98 (1998)	Ichor (2000)	Utopia A.D. (2001)

Professional ratings
Review scores
Source	Rating
Allmusic	link

Ichor is The Black League's first full-length album, released in 2000 by Spinefarm Records. A music video was made of the song "Winter Winds Sing". The limited 2LP version of Ichor includes two bonus tracks: "The Everlasting Pt. III" and "Pain Without A Name" of which the former was later re-recorded for the Doomsday Sun EP.

== Track listing ==
1. "Doomwatcher" (Jarva et al.) - 2:17
2. "One Colour: Black" (Jarva et al.) - 4:59
3. "Deep Waters" (Jarva et al.) - 4:33
4. "Goin' to Hell" (Jarva et al.) - 4:08
5. "Avalon" (Jarva et al.) - 3:33
6. "We Die Alone" (Jarva, Florida et al.) - 4:20
7. "The Everlasting, Part II" (Florida, Jarva et al.) - 3:54
8. "Ozymandias" (Jarva et al.) - 3:26
9. "Blood of the Gods" (Jarva et al.) - 4:58
10. "Bunker King" (Luttinen, Jarva et al.) - 4:57
11. "Winter Winds Sing" (Jarva et al.) - 4:48
12. "Ecce Homo!" (Jarva et al.) - 3:45
13. "Night on Earth" (Jarva et al.) - 8:49

All lyrics by Taneli Jarva except Ozymandias by P.B. Shelley.

== Musicians ==
- Taneli Jarva — Vocals & additional instruments
- Sir Luttinen — Drums, percussion & keyboards
- Maike Valanne — Guitars
- Alexi Ranta — Guitars
- Florida — Bass guitar
