= Man's Ruin Revisited =

Studio album by The Black League
- Released: 2004
- Recorded: Seawolf Studio in August - October 2003
- Genre: Heavy metal
- Length: 44:59
- Label: Spinefarm Records
- Producer: Hannu Leidén

The Black League chronology
Utopia A.D. (2001)	Man's Ruin Revisited (2004)	A Place Called Bad (2005)

Professional ratings
Review scores
Source	Rating
MetalReviews	80/100

Man's Ruin Revisited is The Black League's third full-length album, released in 2004 by Spinefarm Records.

== Track listing ==
1. "Old World Monkey" (Jarva et al.) - 3:17
2. "Alive & Dead" (Luttinen, Jarva et al.) - 3:17
3. "Cold Women and Warm Beer" (Luttinen, Jarva et al.) - 4:40
4. "Hot Wheels" (Aaltonen, Häkkinen, Stanley) - 2:41
5. "Black Water Forever" (Jarva et al.) - 3:53
6. "Lost in the Shadows, I Walk Alone" (Luttinen, Jarva et al.) - 4:01
7. "Ain't No Friend o' Mine" (Valanne, Jarva et al.) - 3:05
8. "The Healer" (Luttinen, Jarva et al.) - 3:08
9. "Crooked Mile" (Luttinen, Jarva et al.) - 3:16
10. "Mad Ol' Country" (Valanne, Jarva et al.) - 4:03
11. "Man's Ruin... Revisited" (Laurila, Jarva et al.) - 2:51
12. "Better Angles (of Our Nature)" (Jarva et al.) - 6:44

All music and lyrics by The Leaguesmen except track 4 by Aaltonen/Häkkinen/Stanley.

== Personnel ==
- Taneli Jarva — vocals
- Sir Luttinen — drums
- Maike Valanne — guitars
- Alexi Ranta — guitars
- Mikko Laurila — bass guitar
- Ultra Bimboos (Milla, Maria & Suffeli) — backing vocals (track 3)
- Don Martinez & "the man" — after party appearance (track 4)
- Antti Litmanen — lead guitar (track 12)
- Chief "Guts" Leidén — backing vocals (tracks 5,7,9,10,12)
