= Sami Kukkohovi =

Finnish musician

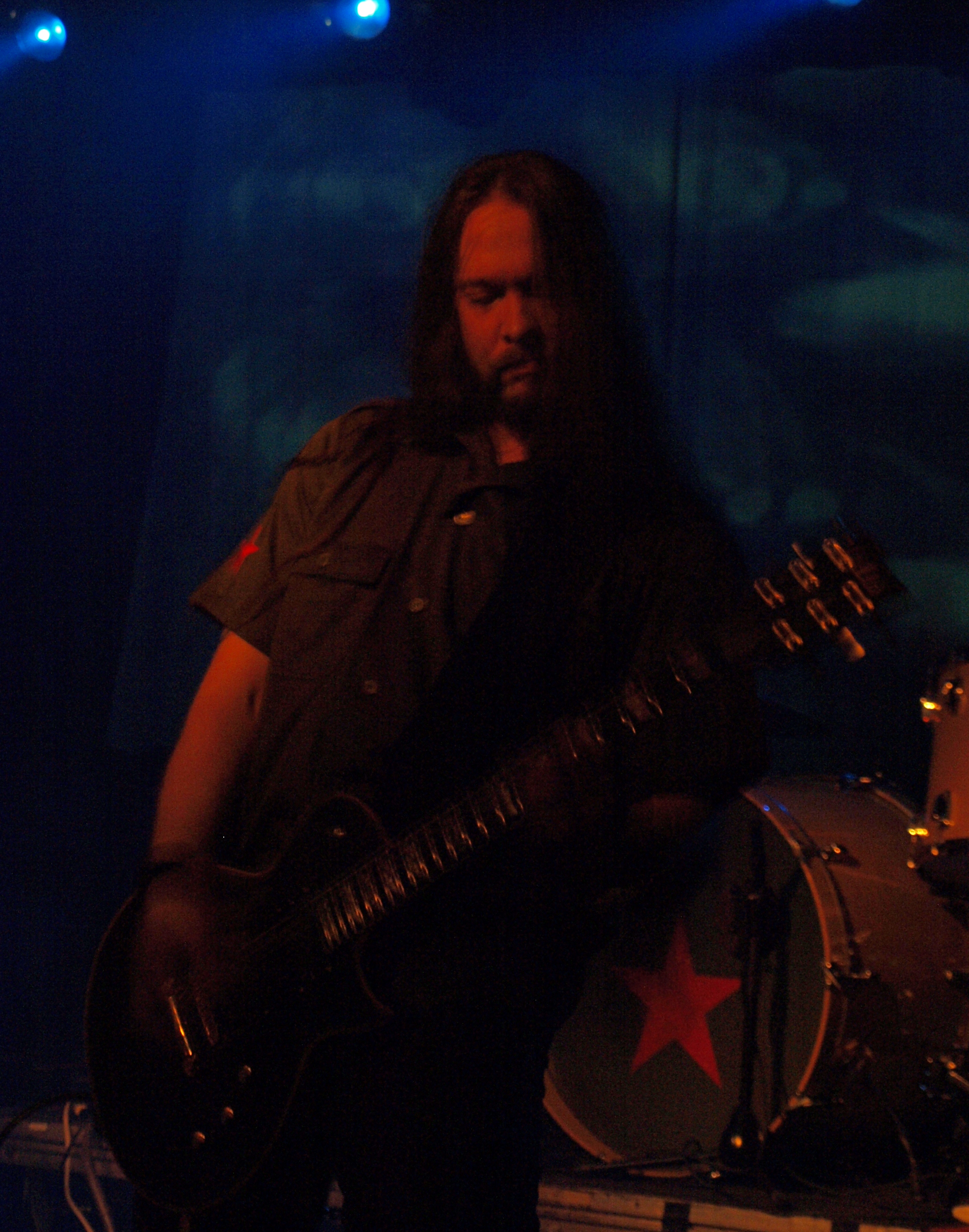
- Kukkohovi in 2008

Background information
- Born: 26 July 1974 (age 51)
- Origin: Oulu, Finland
- Genres: Hard rock, gothic metal, heavy metal
- Occupation: Musician
- Instrument(s): Guitar, bass guitar

Sami Kukkohovi (born 26 July 1974) is a Finnish musician, best known as the bassist of the metal band Sentenced. He joined the band in 1996, replacing Taneli Jarva, and stayed with Sentenced until they disbanded in 2005. He was originally only a session member on gigs, but after that he joined the band officially. In addition to playing the bass guitar, he was also the backing vocalist.

Kukkohovi was also the guitar player for the metal band Solution 13 during his time with Sentenced. On live shows of the doom metal band KYPCK, the crew is strengthened by Kukkohovi playing the second guitar. Currently Kukkohovi is playing with his new band Fiasco General.

== Discography ==
=== Studio albums ===
with Sentenced

- Frozen (1998)
- Crimson (2000)
- The Cold White Light (2002)
- The Funeral Album (2005)

=== Live album ===
with Sentenced

- Buried Alive (2 discs, 2006)

=== Demotracks ===
with Fiasco General

- All Roads Lead to Pain (2007)
- Void (2007)

=== DVDs ===
with Sentenced

- Buried Alive (two discs, 2006)

=== Singles ===
with Sentenced

- Killing Me Killing You (1999)
- No One There (2002)
- Routasydän (2003)
- Ever-Frost (2005)
