= KYPCK =

Finnish doom metal band

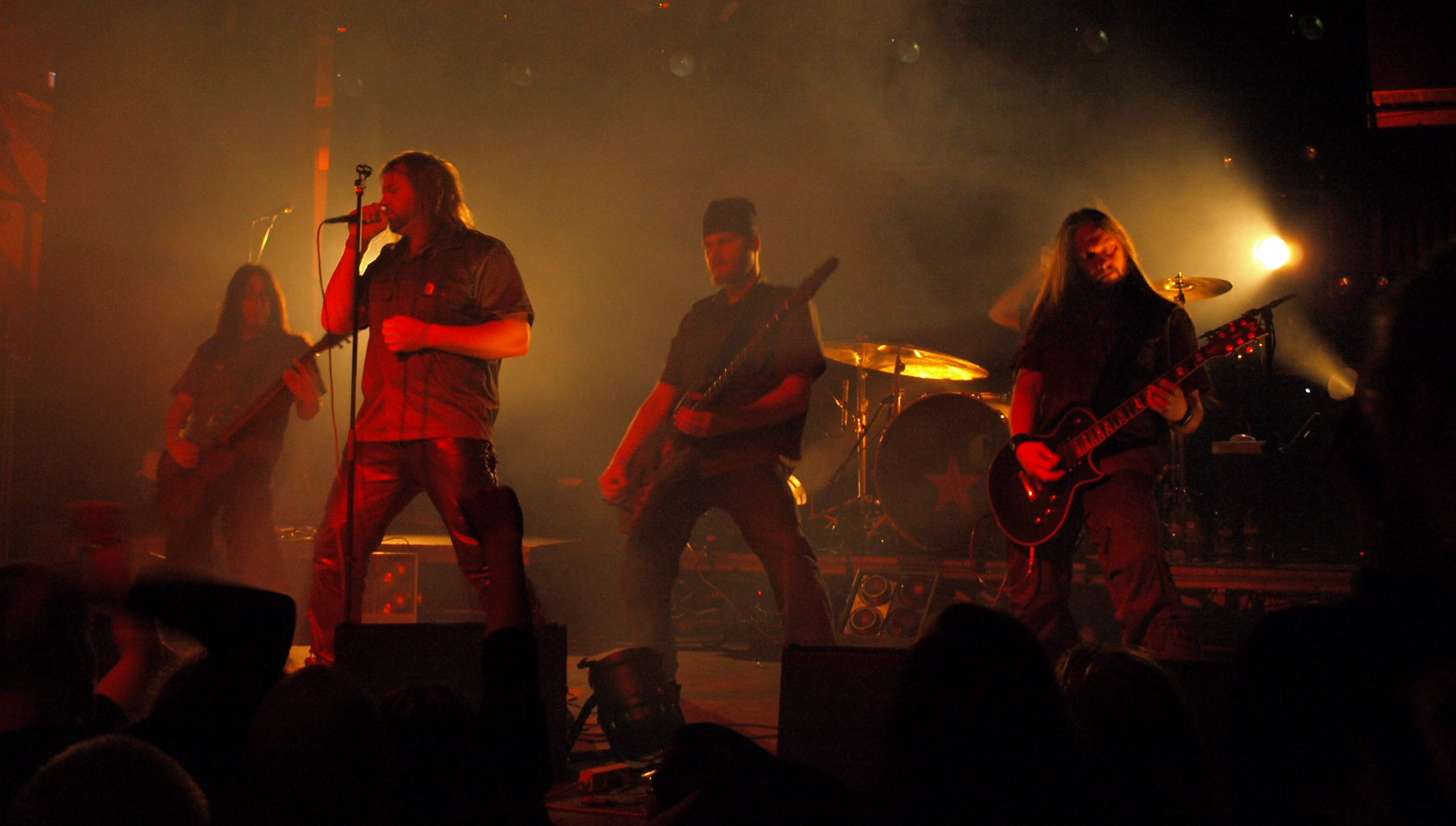
- KYPCK performing in 2008

Background information
- Origin: Finland
- Genres: Doom metal
- Years active: 2007–2024
- Labels: UHO Production; Century Media; Yellow House; Ranka Kustannus
- Members: E. Seppänen; S.S. Lopakka; J.T. Ylä-Rautio; K.H.M. Hiilesmaa; S. Kukkohovi; A.K. Karihtala
- Website: kypck-doom.com
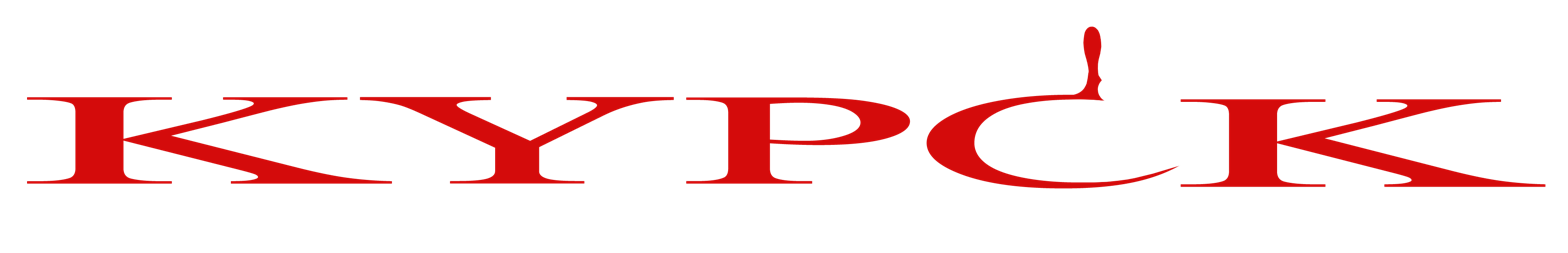

KYPCK (Volapuk rendition from Russian "Курск", "Kursk" in the Western Alphabet) is a Finnish doom metal band. They were formed in 2007 and sing entirely in Russian. The band is composed of singer Erkki Seppänen, ex-Sentenced members Sami Lopakka and Sami Kukkohovi (guitar), bassist Jaakko Ylä-Rautio, and drummer Antti Karihtala, who replaced original drummer Hiili Hiilesmaa.

== History ==
KYPCK formed in 2007. The band's vocalist Erkki Seppänen speaks fluent Russian after his years at Oxford University and working in the Finnish embassy in Moscow. The band's debut album Cherno ("Black") was released in 2008, their second album Nizhe ("Lower") in 2011, their third album Imena na Stene ("The Names on the Wall") in 2014, and their fourth album Zero in 2016.

KYPCK's distinctive live performances have included Soviet Era video projections and peculiar instruments like bassist Ylä-Rautio's one-stringed bass Kypcklop, and guitarist Lopakka's six-stringer, built by Amfisound Guitars, around a genuine Kalashnikov AK-47 assault rifle.

KYPCK created their own genre called "Doomsday Metal" and have broken numerous barriers on their way: The first album sang entirely in the Russian language to have been released worldwide; the lengthiest Russian tour ever by a Western band – from St. Petersburg to Siberia's Irkutsk; songs on the playlist of Russia's biggest rock radio station, who have strictly ruled out including non-Russian bands in their playlist rotation. In 2015, the band was banned from entering Belarus, until February 2018, when they played a concert in Minsk, Belarus.

All of KYPCK's albums include Cyrillic Russian lyrics and English translations in the booklet of the album.

In 2024, the musicians went on a farewell tour, after which the group officially ceased to exist under the name KYPCK. The new group will have the same musicians, but the band will play in a different style and under a different name.

== Members ==
Last lineup

- E. Seppänen – vocals (2007–2024)
- S.S. Lopakka – Lopashnikov six-string instruments (guitars) (2007–2024)
- J.T. Ylä-Rautio – one-string instruments (one-string bass guitar) (2007–2024)
- S. Kukkohovi – six-string instruments (guitars) (2011–2024; touring 2008–2011)
- A.K. Karihtala – batteria (drums) (2011–2024)

Former members

- K.H.M. Hiilesmaa – batteria (drums) (2007–2011)

== Discography ==
=== Studio albums ===
- Cherno ("Black") (2008)
- Nizhe ("Lower") (2011)
- Imena na Stene ("The Names on the Wall") (2014)
- Zero (2016)
- Prestupleniya protiv chelovechestva ("Crimes Against Humanity") (2023)

=== Singles ===
- 1917 (2008)
- Imya na Stene ("The Name on the Wall", 2014)
- All About Us (t.A.T.u. cover) (2016)

== Videography ==
- 1917 (2008)
- Stalingrad (2009)
- Alleya Stalina ("The Alley of Stalin", 2011)
- Imya na Stene ("The Name on the Wall", 2014)
- Deti Birkenau ("The Children of Birkenau", 2014)
- Ya svoboden ("I Am Free", 2016)
