= Poisonblack =

Finnish metal band

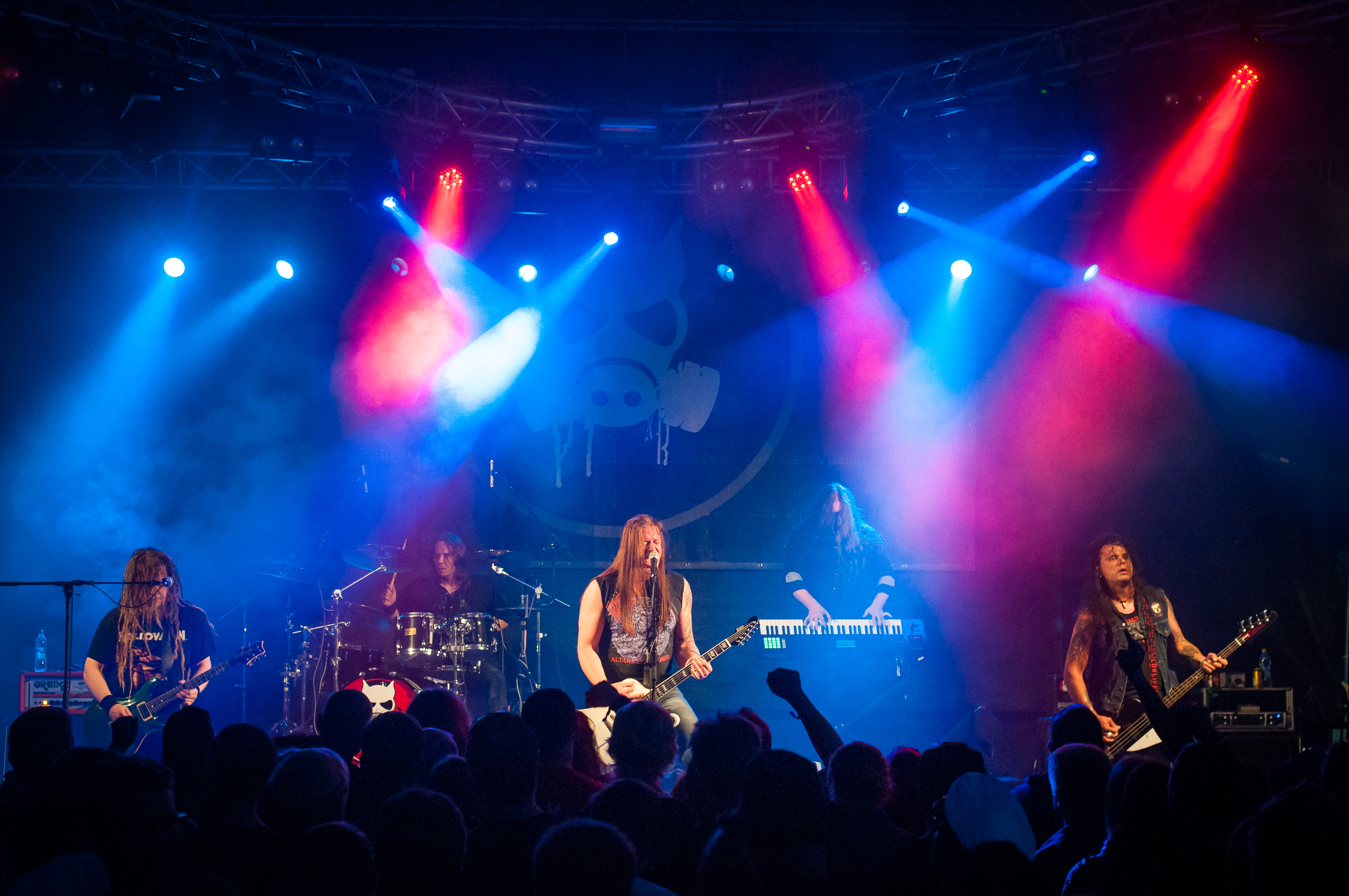
- Poisonblack performing in 2014

Background information
- Origin: Oulu, Finland
- Genres: Heavy metal, gothic metal
- Years active: 2000–2015, 2023
- Label: Hype Records
- Past members: Ville Laihiala; Juha-Pekka Leppäluoto; Tarmo Kanerva; Marco Sneck; Antti Remes; Antti Leiviskä; Janne Markus; Janne Kukkonen; Janne Dahlgren
- Website: poisonblack.com

Poisonblack was a Finnish gothic metal band led by singer and guitarist Ville Laihiala. They released six studio albums.

== History ==
In 2003, the band's first album, Escapexstacy, was on the Finnish national charts for three weeks, peaking at No. 21. They opened for Iron Maiden at the Hartwall Areena in Helsinki on 21 December 2003 for the Dance of Death World Tour.

Singer Juha-Pekka Leppäluoto left in the autumn of 2003 to concentrate on his work with Charon. Ville Laihiala, the band's principal songwriter, assumed vocal duties and has since led Poisonblack out of the gothic genre of their first album and in a musical direction that closely mirrors that of his former band Sentenced.

In 2006, the band toured Europe with Lacuna Coil, and their second album, Lust Stained Despair reached No. 2 in Finland for one week.

In 2008, they released A Dead Heavy Day, which hit the Finnish Album Chart in position 6. Following this success, they toured Europe with Dark Tranquillity and Fear My Thoughts. In 2010, Poisonblack released Of Rust and Bones, their fourth album. The fifth album, Drive, was released in 2011 on Hype Records, and the band's latest album, Lyijy, was released in September 2013 by Warner Music Finland. The album reached No. 4 on the Finnish album chart.

On 23 August 2015, singer Ville Laihiala posted a statement announcing that the band had broken up. The band played their final show in Oulu, Finland, on August 21, 2015, with Leppäluoto joining them for their final performance.

Poisonblack reunited and performed several shows in 2023 for Escapexstacy's 20th anniversary. All of the band's members, throughout their tenure, reunited, except for Dahlgren and Kukkonen.

== Band members ==
=== Last known lineup ===
- Juha-Pekka Leppäluoto – vocals (2001–2003, 2015, 2023)
- Ville Laihiala – vocals (2003–2015, 2023), guitars (2000–2015, 2023)
- Antti Leiviskä – guitars (2010–2015, 2023)
- Janne Markus – guitars (2004–2010, 2023)
- Antti Remes – bass (2004–2015, 2023)
- Marco Sneck – keyboards (2000–2015, 2023)
- Tarmo Kanerva – drums (2000–2015, 2023)

=== Former members ===
- Janne Dahlgren – guitars (2000–2003)
- Janne Kukkonen – bass (2000–2004)

=== Touring member ===
- Veli-Matti Kananen – keyboards (2008)

== Discography ==
=== Albums ===
- Escapexstacy (2003)
- Lust Stained Despair (2006)
- A Dead Heavy Day (2008)
- Of Rust and Bones (2010)
- Drive (2011)
- Lyijy (2013)

=== Video albums ===
- A Dead Heavy Day (DVD) (2008)

=== Singles ===
- "Love Infernal" (2003)
- "Rush" (2006)
- "Bear the Cross" (2008)
- "Mercury Falling" (2011)
- "Scars" (2011)
- "Home Is Where the Sty Is" (2013)
- "Down the Ashes Rain" (2014)

=== Compilation ===
- Classics (2009)
