= Sentenced =

Finnish metal band

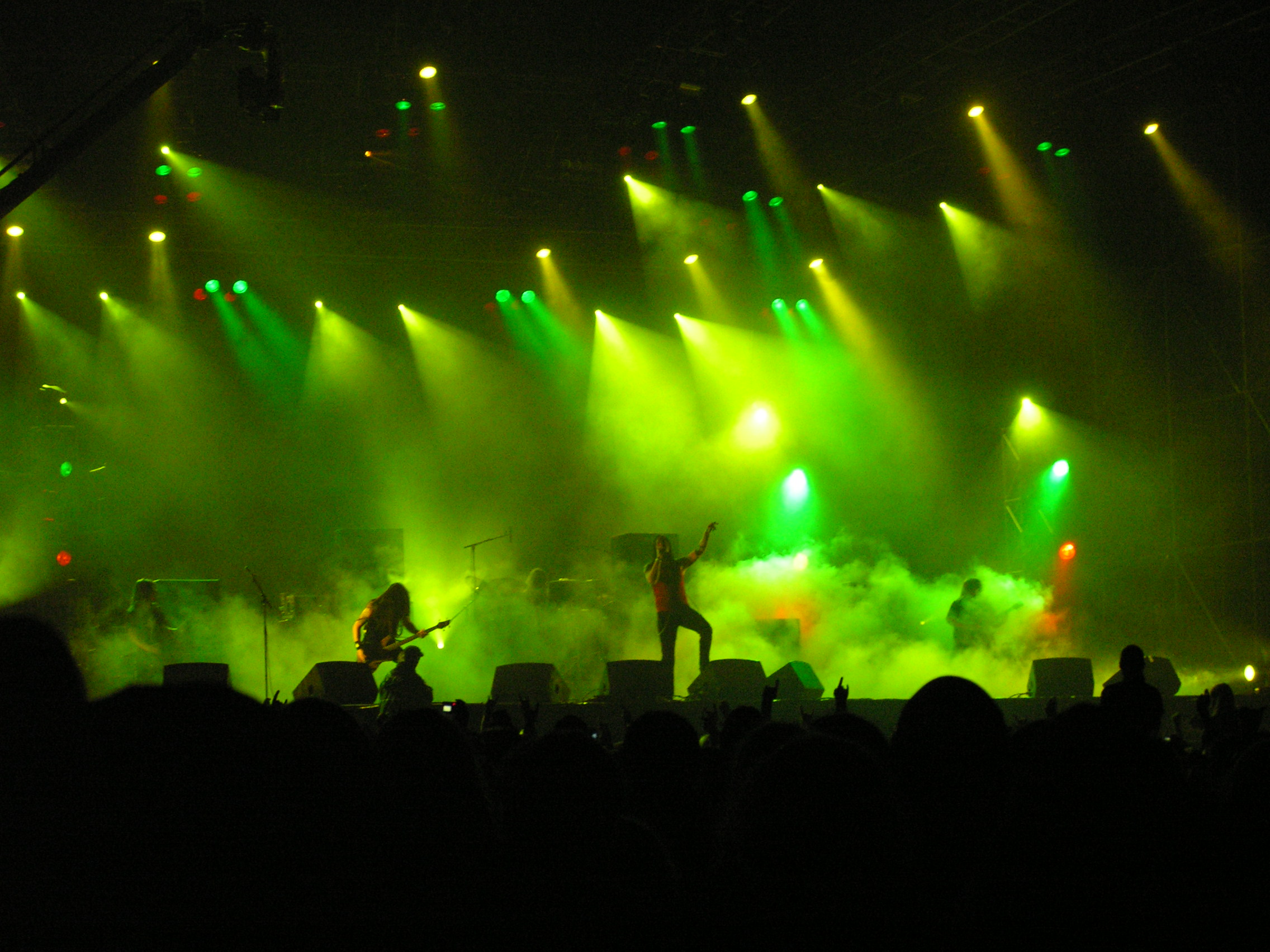
- Sentenced at Wacken Open Air 2005

Background information
- Also known as: Deformity (1988–1989)
- Origin: Muhos, Oulu, Finland
- Genres: Gothic metal; melodic death metal (early); death metal (originally)
- Years active: 1989–2005
- Label: Century Media
- Past members: Ville Laihiala; Miika Tenkula; Sami Lopakka; Sami Kukkohovi; Vesa Ranta; Taneli Jarva; Lari Kylmänen

Sentenced, founded as Deformity, was a Finnish gothic metal band that played melodic death metal in their early years. The band formed in 1989 in Muhos and broke up in 2005.

Lead guitarist Miika Tenkula was the band's singer for the first album, but bassist Taneli Jarva took over vocals for the next two albums, North from Here and Amok, until his departure in 1995. With new lead vocalist Ville Laihiala, Sentenced shifted from melodic death metal to gothic metal and enjoyed a run of commercial success in Finland, including three consecutive number-one albums. The band announced in 2005 that their eighth album, The Funeral Album, would be their last. The single "Ever-Frost" spent six weeks at number one in Finland. Sentenced's final show took place on 1 October in their hometown, Oulu.

Tenkula died of a heart attack in 2009.

== History ==
=== Early years (1988–1991) ===
Sentenced started in 1988 as Deformity and changed their name to Sentenced in 1989, after a few line-up changes. The original line-up consisted of Miika Tenkula (lead guitar and vocals), Sami Lopakka (guitar), Vesa Ranta (drums), and Lari Kylmänen (bass). They recorded two demo tapes: When Death Joins Us... in 1990 and Rotting Ways to Misery in 1991. The band signed with French label Thrash Records after their first demo.

=== Shadows of the Past (1991–1993) ===
In 1991, bassist Taneli Jarva joined the band, replacing Kylmänen as the band was about to record their debut album, Shadows of the Past. At that time, they played fast European death metal. In Spring 1992, they recorded the three-song promotional tape Journey to Pohjola and signed with Spinefarm Records. By 1992, they had played over 50 live shows and sold all 1500 copies of their debut album Shadows of the Past, their earlier two demos, and a great deal of merchandise.

=== North from Here (1993–1994) ===
The second album, North from Here, was released in the spring of 1993, and later that year, The Trooper EP. Jarva assumed lead vocals, using a different style than Tenkula's. North From Here drew the attention of German record label Century Media Records, and in 1994, Sentenced left Spinefarm and signed a multi-album contract with Century Media.

=== Amok (1994–1996) ===
In 1995, Sentenced released their breakthrough album, Amok, considered by many their best work. Compared to earlier releases, the music was slower and more melodic. The track "Nepenthe" was complemented with a music video and the band toured Europe supporting Samael and Tiamat.

In autumn, the band released the Love & Death CD. It was similar to Amok, whose songs had been written around the same time. Sentenced achieved success in doom/death markets, but Jarva left the band because of personal issues.

=== Down (1996–1998) ===
After Jarva's departure, Ville Laihiala of Breed joined the band in 1996, weeks before the band headed to Germany to record their fourth album, Down, with producer Waldemar Sorychta. The music was more melodic with a NWOBHM influence. At this time, bassist Sami Kukkohovi joined the band as a session member on shows. Later, in spring 1997, he became a permanent member. Down gained positive reviews in music magazines all over the world, and was named Album of the month in German magazines Rock Hard and Metal Hammer.

=== Frozen (1998–2000) ===
Sentenced's fifth full-length album, Frozen, was recorded at the Woodhouse Studios, and released in 1998, with a style similar to Down. Laihiala and Kukkohovi participated in the composition. In 1999, a special edition of Frozen was released, containing a gold cover and rearranged track list, with four cover songs.

=== Crimson (2000–2002) ===
The next Sentenced album was Crimson in 2000. The single "Killing Me, Killing You" turned the band away from melodic death metal. The album was followed by an extensive tour. They visited USA for the first time. The album peaked in 1st place on the Finnish album chart.

=== The Cold White Light (2002–2004) ===
Two years after The Cold White Light, the band's lyrics displayed self-irony and a positive edge. They released the single "No One There", which peaked The Finnish Charts at Number 1 following that with an extensive US tour alongside Killswitch Engage, Dark Tranquillity and In Flames. The album peaked 45th place in the German album chart. The single "No One There" was on the 1st place as well in the Finnish single chart. The band went on a European Tour with Lacuna Coil.

After The Cold White Light, they released a CD single in 2003 along with songs by other bands on a four track compilation single that was dedicated to Oulun Kärpät, the ice hockey team of the band's hometown, Routasydän (translates to "Heart of Permafrost") remains the only song Sentenced sang in Finnish, and cannot be found elsewhere. The song caused something of a stir in Finland, as several politicians reviewed the lyrics and purported them to contain Nazi overtones, which the band has steadfastly refuted. The band played Wacken Open Air in August 2003.

=== The Funeral Album and final gigs (2005) ===
In early 2005 the band announced that their following release, The Funeral Album, would be their last. They performed farewell gigs during the spring and summer and ended with a final show on 1 October 2005 in their hometown Oulu. The concert film Buried Alive, directed by Mika Ronkainen, filmed at the funeral gig, was premiered at Oulu Music Video Festival on 9 September 2006. In 2005 The Funeral Album was awarded gold status in Finland for sales in excess of 15,000 copies, footage of the event is filmed in the Buried Alive DVD! The CD topped the Finnish album chart upon its release in May 2005 and made it to position No. 49 on the German Media Control chart. "Ever-Frost" single went straight to 1st position on Official Finnish Single Chart staying there for six straight weeks.

== Recognition and awards ==
Sentenced were awarded Platinum in the band's native Finland for their posthumous live DVD Buried Alive. The trophy was handed out to the band's former members at the Century Media 20th anniversary party at the Tavastia club in Helsinki on 14 August 2008, where Poisonblack and labelmates Norther and Kivimetsän Druidi played exclusive gigs to properly celebrate this special event.

== Legacy ==
All hope for the band to return was gone when guitarist and founding member Miika Tenkula died on 19 February 2009. On 26 June 2009 it was announced by his family that Tenkula died from a heart attack caused by a genetic heart condition that he had for many years previous to the break-up. He is buried in the Kirkkosaari cemetery in his hometown Muhos.

On 13 November 2009, Sentenced released a box set of 16 CDs and 2 DVDs chronicling their entire career in a coffin-shaped box. The box-set also included rare and previously unreleased tracks.

In 2011 a tribute CD was released by a couple of Russian bands. The CD is called "Russian Tribute To Sentenced".

On 12 December 2014, a book written by Matti Riekki, a Finnish rock journalist, about the band's history was published, titled Täältä Pohjoiseen - Sentencedin Tarina'. After years of being available in Finnish only, an English translation was published in 2021. The title translates to North from Here – The Story of Sentenced.

Vesa Ranta released a photo book Agony Walk – On the Road with Sentenced in September 2019.

Sami Lopakka released his first novel, Marras, in January 2014. The novel is about a fictional Oulu-based metal band's European tour and has elements inspired by his experiences when previously touring with Sentenced.

== Members ==
Final lineup

- Miika Tenkula – lead guitar (1989–2005; died 2009), vocals (1989–1992)
- Sami Lopakka – rhythm guitar (1989–2005)
- Vesa Ranta – drums (1989–2005)
- Ville Laihiala – vocals (1996–2005)
- Sami Kukkohovi – bass (1997–2005)

Prior members

- Lari Kylmänen – bass (1989–1991)
- Taneli Jarva – bass (1991–1995), vocals (1992–1995)

Tour members

- Niko Karppinen – bass (1995–1996)
- Tarmo Kanerva – drums (1999)

== Discography ==
- Shadows of the Past (1991)
- North from Here (1993)
- Amok (1995)
- Down (1996)
- Frozen (1998)
- Crimson (2000)
- The Cold White Light (2002)
- The Funeral Album (2005)
