= Miika Tenkula =

Finnish guitarist (1974–2009)

- Also known as: M. Steelgrave
- Born: 6 March 1974; Oulu, Finland
- Died: 18 February 2009 (aged 34) Muhos, Finland
- Genres: Death metal, melodic death metal, gothic metal
- Occupations: Musician, songwriter
- Instrument: Guitar
- Years active: 1989–2005
- Formerly of: Sentenced

Miika Tenkula (6 March 1974 – 18 February 2009) was a Finnish heavy metal musician. He was the lead guitarist and the main songwriter for Sentenced until it disbanded in 2005. He was also the band's original vocalist from 1989 to late 1992.

== Death ==
After Sentenced disbanded, Tenkula withdrew from public. On 18 February 2009, he died in his home town of Muhos as a result a sudden heart attack caused by genetic heart disease. On 22 February, his former band members remembered him in an obituary published on the official Sentenced website as "a dear friend, a truly remarkable artist and musician, and the very soul of what used to be Sentenced. Rest now, brother – in your music and our hearts you will live forever."

An open memorial was held in the Club Teatria in the city of Oulu on 18 April 2009. The ceremony featured music and a concert film, Buried Alive, which was the band's last concert and had been filmed in the same location in 2005. Music included Tenkula's favourite artists and cover versions from the Sentenced songs by various Finnish artists.

Finnish melodic death metal band Insomnium's song "Weighed Down with Sorrow" from their 2009 album Across the Dark is dedicated to Tenkula. As well as Austrian post-rock band Professor Flitch's song "Miika".
