= Sami Lopakka =

Finnish guitarist (born 1975)

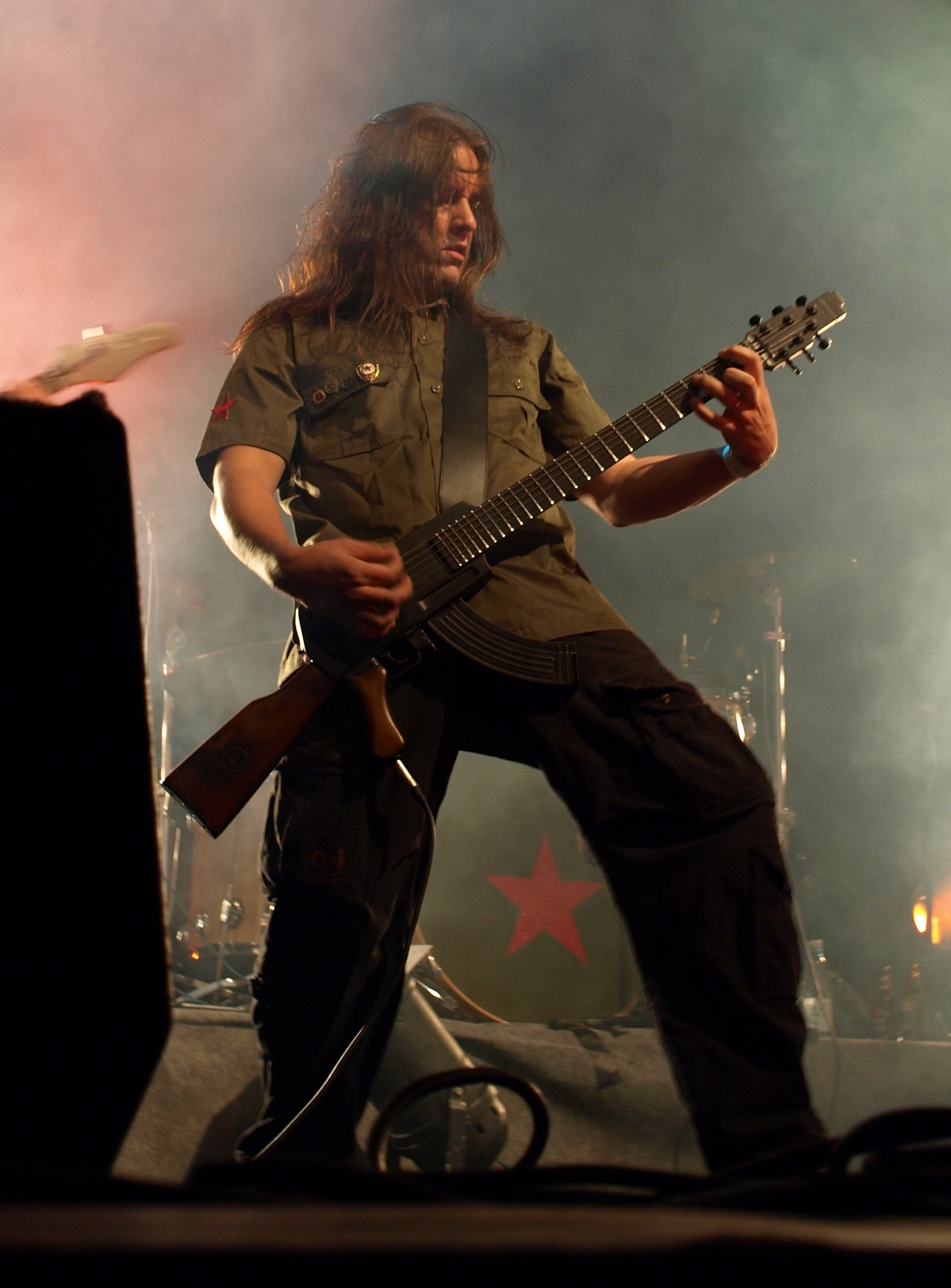
- Lopakka in 2008

Background information
- Also known as: S.S. Lopakka; The Serial Self-Killer
- Born: 17 January 1975 (age 50)
- Origin: Finland
- Genres: Heavy metal, death metal, doom metal, melodic death metal, gothic metal
- Occupation(s): Musician, songwriter, author
- Instrument: Guitar
- Years active: 1989–present
- Member of: KYPCK
- Formerly of: Sentenced

Sami Lopakka (born 17 January 1975) is a Finnish guitarist and author. He was one of two guitarists for the metal band Sentenced until it disbanded (1989–2005). He was the band's main lyricist and was also considered to be the spokesman for the band.

From 2007 to 2024, Lopakka has been the guitarist and main songwriter for the Russian-singing Finnish metal band KYPCK, with whom he plays a custom baritone guitar built around a Kalashnikov AK-47 assault rifle by Amfisound Guitars.

As an author, Lopakka's debut novel Marras was published in January 2014 by Like Kustannus Oy in Finland. His short story Uudet lasit was published in the Finnish edition of Granta literary magazine in the same year.

== Sources ==
- Sentenced HomeGrave – Sentenced's official website
- KYPCK Ground Zero – KYPCK's official website
- KYPCK Headquarters – KYPCK's official Facebook page
- Book publisher's website
