= Swords into ploughshares =

Converting weapons to peaceful civilian applications

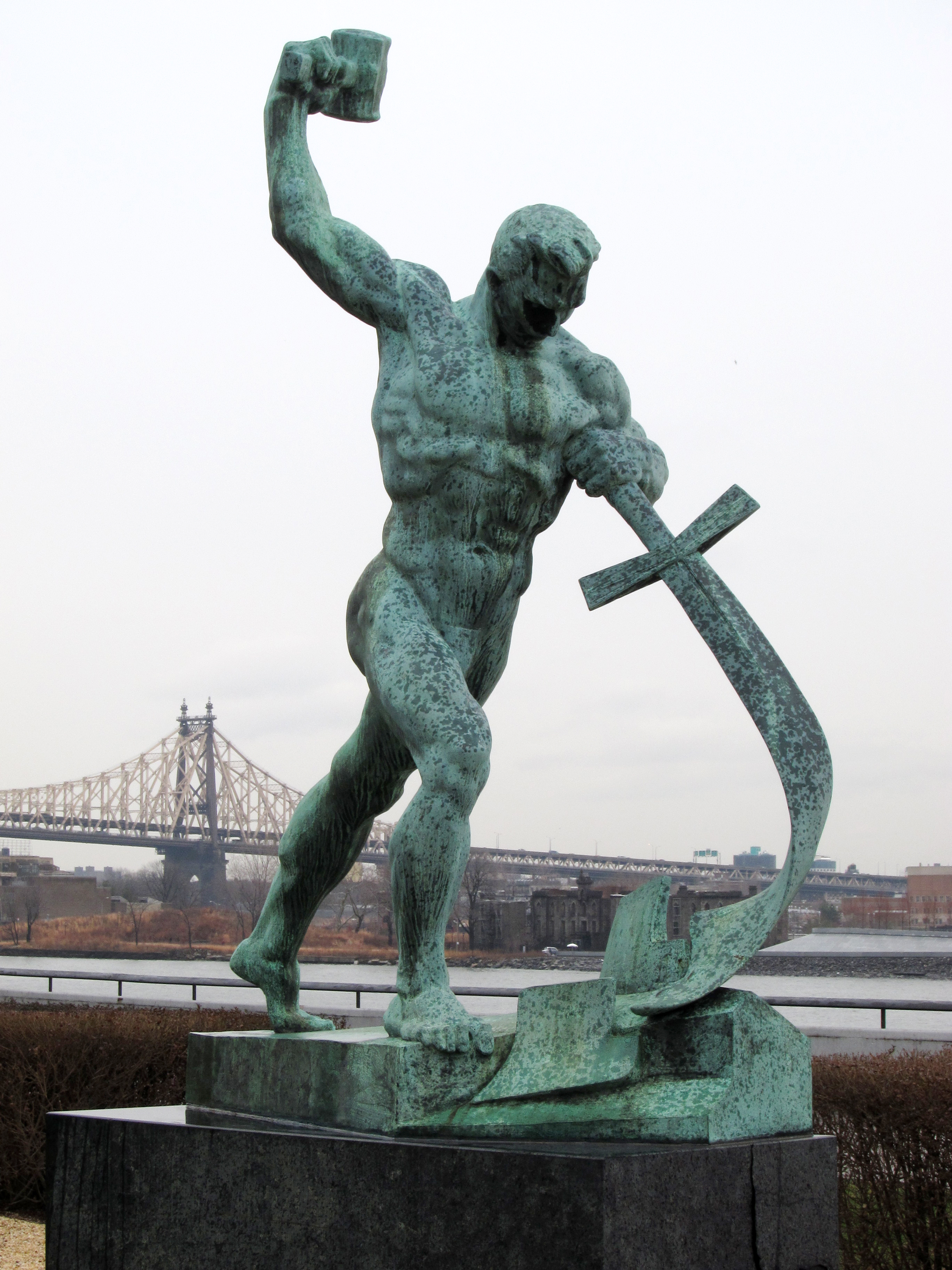
Let Us Beat Swords into Ploughshares, a 1959 sculpture by Evgeniy Vuchetich in the United Nations Art Collection

The Starry Plough flag, with a sword in place of a ploughshare

Hand-separated large candlestick church chandelier with brass wax drip tray – GDR around 1980 – Use of armoured steel and brass – Single piece – Weight 10 kilograms

"Beating swords into ploughshares" (or plowshares) is the conversion of military weapons or technologies for peaceful civilian applications. The phrase originates from Isaiah 2:4:

Many peoples shall come and say, "Come, let us go up to the mountain of the Lord, to the house of the God of Jacob; that he may teach us his ways and that we may walk in his paths." For out of Zion shall go forth instruction, and the word of the Lord from Jerusalem. He shall judge between the nations, and shall arbitrate for many peoples; they shall beat their swords into plowshares, and their spears into pruning hooks; nation shall not lift up sword against nation, neither shall they learn war any more.

— Isaiah 2:3–4

The ploughshare (Hebrew: אֵת ’êṯ, also translated coulter) is often used to symbolize creative tools that benefit humankind, as opposed to destructive tools of war, symbolized by the sword (Hebrew: חֶרֶב ḥereḇ), a similar sharp metal tool with an arguably opposite use. The rest of the passage similarly equates spears with pruning hooks.

In addition to the original Biblical Messianic intent, the expression "beat swords into ploughshares" has been used by various pacifist movements.

A past example from the period 1993 continuing to 2013 is the dismantling of nuclear weapons and the use of their contents as fuel in civilian electric power stations, the Megatons to Megawatts Program. Nuclear fission development, originally accelerated for World War II weapons needs, has been applied to many civilian purposes since its use at Hiroshima and Nagasaki, including electricity and radiopharmaceutical production.

== Biblical references ==
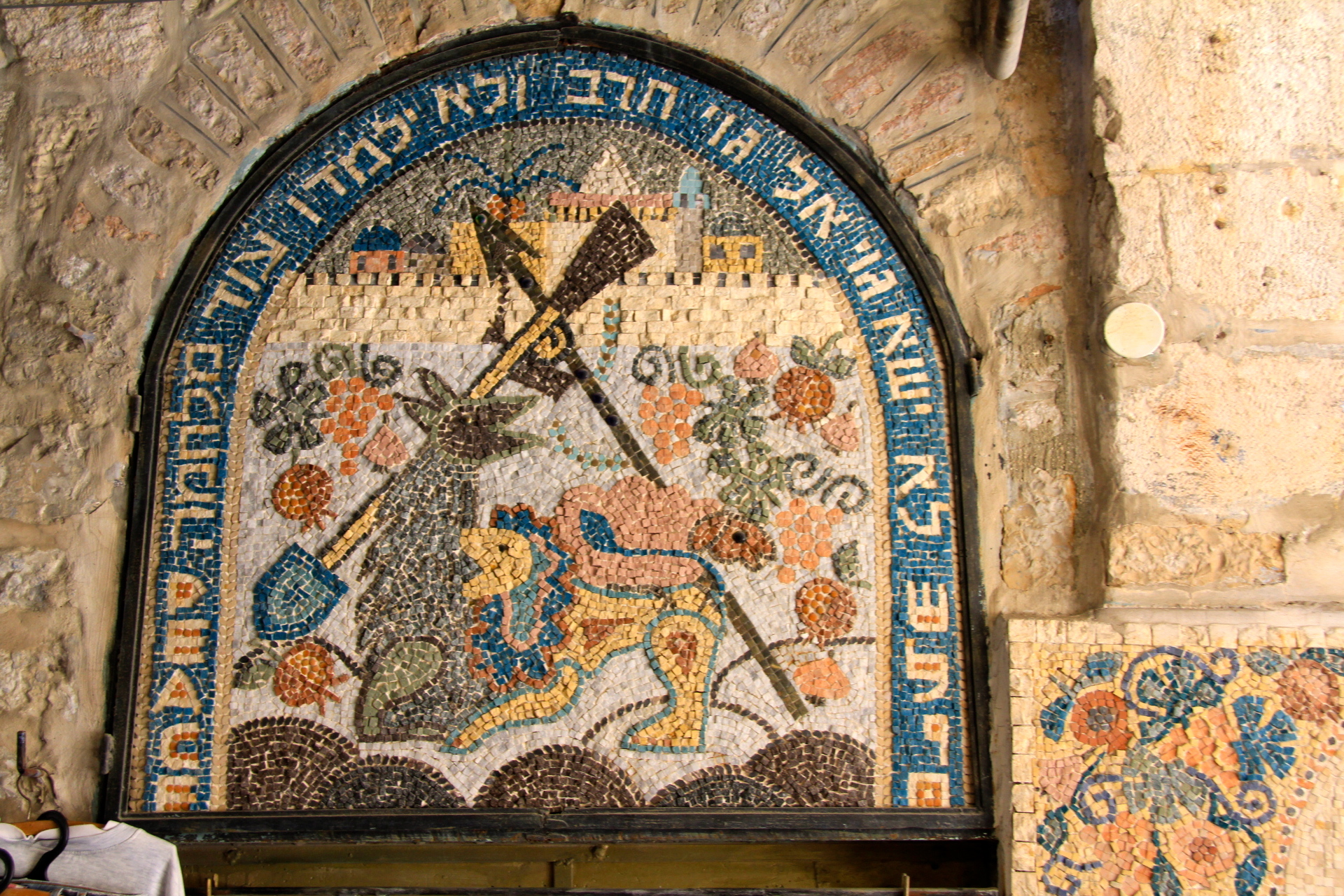
Mosaic in the Beit Habad Gallery, Jerusalem, quoting Isaiah 2:4, with lion, spear and spade

Beyond the above usage in the Book of Isaiah, this analogy is used twice more in the Old Testament/Tanakh, in both directions. In Micah, it is recited word for word:

He shall judge between many peoples, and shall arbitrate between strong nations far away; they shall beat their swords into plowshares, and their spears into pruning hooks; nation shall not lift up sword against nation, neither shall they learn war any more.

— Micah 4:3

In Joel, the opposite is said:

Beat your plowshares into swords, and your pruning hooks into spears; let the weakling say, “I am a warrior.”

— Joel 3:10 or 4:10 in the Masoretic system.

An expression of this concept can be seen in a bronze statue in the United Nations garden called Let Us Beat Swords into Plowshares, a gift from the Soviet Union sculpted by Evgeniy Vuchetich, representing the figure of a man hammering a sword into the shape of a plowshare.

== Confucianism ==
James Legge's translation of Analects of Confucius includes a story of Confucius asking his disciples to list their aims, resulting in praise for the virtue of Yan Hui:

At last came Yen Yuan, who said "I should like to find an intelligent king and sage ruler whom I might assist. I would diffuse among the people instructions on the five great points, and lead them on by the rules of propriety and music, so that they should not care to fortify their cities by walls and moats, but would fuse their swords and spears into implements of agriculture.

— "Chapter V, Section III: His Immediate Disciples", Confucian Analects, The Great Learning, and The Doctrine of the Mean (1892)

== Practical applications ==
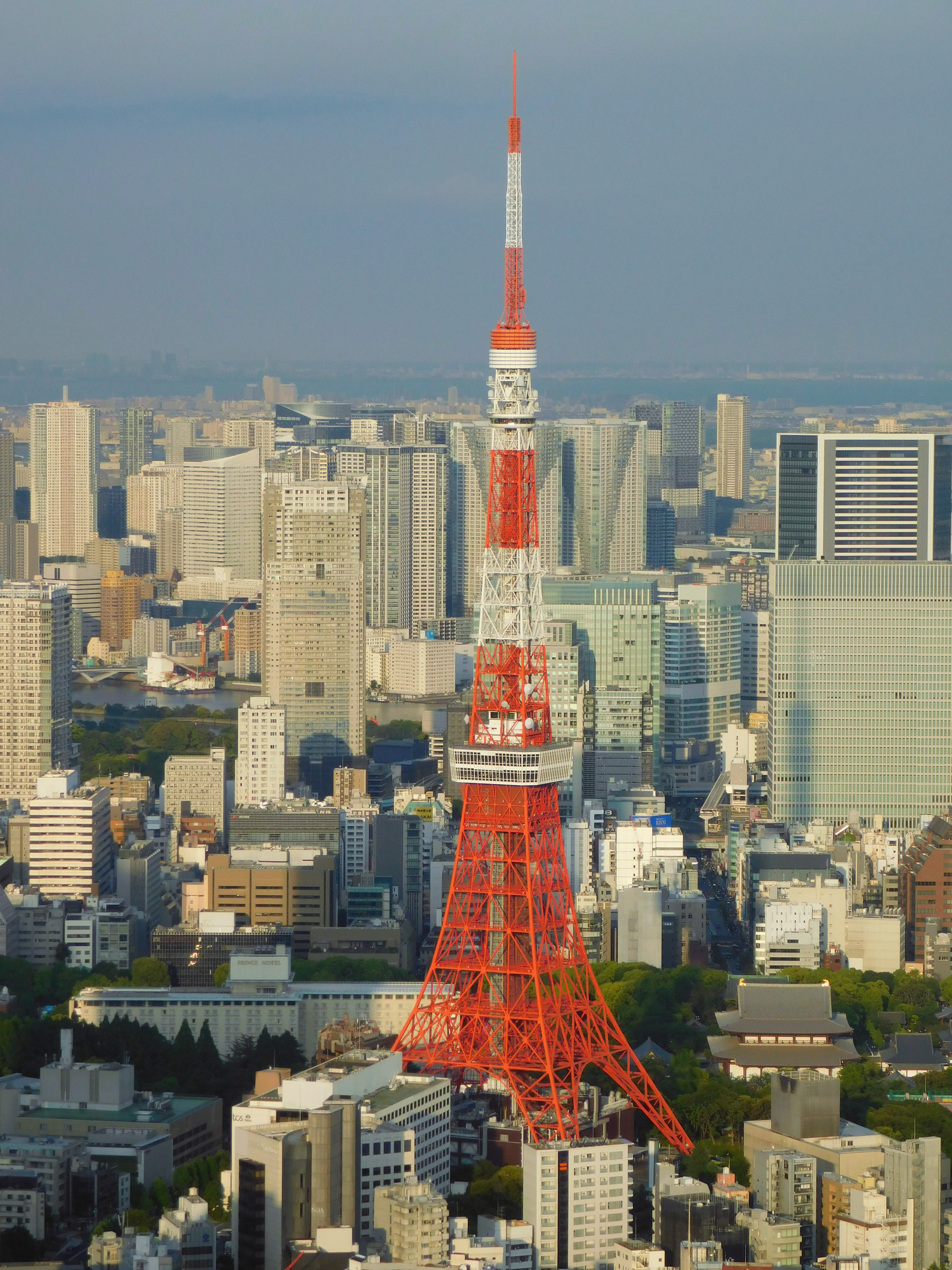
Tokyo Tower, the second-tallest tower in Japan, is partially constructed from steel obtained by recycling US tanks damaged in battle during the Korean War.

- After World War II, military surplus AFVs were sometimes converted into bulldozers, agricultural, and logging tractors, as seen in the American television series Ax Men. Two are currently preserved at the Swords and Ploughshares Museum in Canada. French farmers sometimes used modified versions of the obsolete FT-17 tank, and similar vehicles, based on the T-34 tank, remain in widespread use in the former USSR. A British agricultural engineer and collector of classic tractors, owns a Sherman tank that was adapted to plow Lincolnshire's fields in response to the shortage of crawler tractors.
- From the 1970s onward, several anti-war musicians have played guitars made from military surplus weapons. Jamaican reggae star Peter Tosh famously owned a Fender Stratocaster built around an M-16 rifle. In the present day the Escopetarra, a guitar converted from the AK-47, is the signature instrument of César López, Souriya Sunshine, and Sami Lopakka of the Finnish death metal band Sentenced.
- Nitrogen mustard, developed from the chemical weapon mustard gas developed in World War I, became the basis for the world's first chemotherapy drug, mustine, developed through the 1940s.
- Peaceful nuclear explosions, the application of nuclear detonations to civilian applications such as excavation and mining, explored by the US (Project Plowshare) and USSR (Nuclear Explosions for the National Economy). However, the nuclear fallout and other contamination produced quickly rendered such programs impractical.
- Swedish aid organization IM Swedish Development Partner launched Humanium Metal, using metal from illegal handguns to create everyday objects. The first product announced was headphones by Yevo.
- The Plowshares movement (British, Christian, founded by Daniel Berrigan), Trident Ploughshares (British) and Pitstop Ploughshares (US, Christian) are peace movements, inspired by the book of Isaiah, in which participants attempt to damage or destroy modern weapons, such as nuclear missiles.
- The Megatons to Megawatts Program, agreed to in 1993 by the United States and Russia, successfully converted 500 metric tonnes of fuel from Soviet-era nuclear warheads into fuel for nuclear power plants over a period of 20 years.

== In political and popular culture ==
- The Starry Plough, a flag associated with revolutionary Irish republicanism and socialism, features a sword as the plowshare.
- Twelve-term US Congressman and three-time presidential candidate Ron Paul wrote a book entitled Swords into Plowshares: A Life in Wartime and a Future of Peace and Prosperity, in which he discusses growing up during World War II and living his life through war after war.
- In his 1961 farewell address, U.S. President Dwight Eisenhower, when speaking about the military–industrial complex, stated:

Until the latest of our world conflicts, the United States had no armaments industry. American makers of plowshares could, with time and as required, make swords as well. But now we can no longer risk emergency improvisation of national defense; we have been compelled to create a permanent armaments industry of vast proportions. Added to this, three and a half million men and women are directly engaged in the defense establishment. We annually spend on military security more than the net income of all United States corporations.

- For his first and second inaugurations, U.S. President Richard Nixon took the oath of office with his hand on two family Bibles, opened to Isaiah 2:2–4.
- In their speeches at the signing of the 1979 Egypt–Israel peace treaty, Jimmy Carter, Anwar Sadat, and Menachem Begin all referenced the saying in calling for peace.
- In Ronald Reagan's address to the 42nd Session of the United Nations General Assembly in New York, New York.

Cannot swords be turned to plowshares? Can we and all nations not live in peace? In our obsession with antagonisms of the moment, we often forget how much unites all the members of humanity. Perhaps we need some outside, universal threat to make us recognize this common bond. I occasionally think how quickly our differences world-wide would vanish if we were facing an alien threat from outside this world. And yet, I ask you, is not an alien force already among us? What could be more alien than war and the threat of war?

- The 1992 song "Ashes In Your Mouth " by Megadeth uses a reference to plows and shear to swords:

Melting down all metals, turning plows and shears to swords
Shun words of the Bible, we need implements of war
Chalklines and red puddles of those who have been slain
Destiny, that crooked schemer, says the dead shall rise again

- The popular anti-war song "The Vine and Fig Tree" from the Greenham Common Women's Peace Camp Songbook repeats the verse

And everyone neath their vine and fig tree
shall live in peace and unafraid,
Everyone neath their vine and fig tree
shall live in peace and unafraid.
And into ploughshares beat their swords
Nations shall learn war no more.
And into ploughshares beat their swords
Nations shall learn war no more.

- The song "The End of the Innocence" by Don Henley (1989) uses the Joel inverted version of the phrase:

O' beautiful, for spacious skies
But now those skies are threatening
They're beating plowshares into swords
For this tired old man that we elected king

- "Heal the World" by Michael Jackson (1991):

Create a world with no fear
Together we'll cry happy tears
See the nations turn
Their swords into plowshares

- Finale of the 1980 musical Les Misérables:

They will live again in freedom
In the garden of the Lord.
They will walk behind the ploughshare,
They will put away the sword.
The chain will be broken
And all men will have their reward.

- Swords to Plowshares is the name of a card in Magic: The Gathering, a popular trading card game.
- A poem by Israeli poet Yehuda Amichai:

Don’t stop after beating the swords
into plowshares, don’t stop! Go on beating
and make musical instruments out of them.
Whoever wants to make war again
will have to turn them into plowshares first.

- Guns into Plowshares, a 1997 sculpture by Mennonite artists Esther Augsburger and Michael Augsburger
- The marketing slogan used by the fictional Globotech Industries in Small Soldiers, serving as the introduction to the movie, and foreshadowing the central plot of smart ballistic missile guidance microprocessors being mistakenly used in children's toys.
- A "Swords into Ploughshares" badge was worn by Christian peace groups in East Germany. Wearers of the badge who refused to take it off were barred from educational and work opportunities by the state.

== See also ==
- Anti-war movement
- Atomic gardening
- Atoms for Peace
- Economic conversion
- Escopetarra
- Guns vs butter
- Megatons to Megawatts Program
- Nonviolence
- Project Plowshare
- Plowshares movement
- Religion and peacebuilding
- All flesh is grass
