= Non-Violence (sculpture) =

Sculpture series by Carl Fredrik Reuterswärd

Coordinates: 40°45′03″N 73°58′04″W

- The Knotted Gun
- Artist: Carl Fredrik Reuterswärd
- Completion date: 1984
- Type: Sculpture

Non-Violence, also known as The Knotted Gun, is a bronze sculpture by Swedish artist Carl Fredrik Reuterswärd of an oversized Colt Python .357 Magnum revolver with its barrel tied in a knot. It is located at the United Nations headquarters in New York City.

== History ==
Carl Fredrik Reuterswärd made this sculpture after the murder of John Lennon, with whom Reuterswärd was acquainted. When learning of the murder he stayed up all night to work on the piece, inspired by the idea of making a knot on the firearm the murderer Mark David Chapman had used. He had previously done pieces of knotted pencils, such as Medium’s Memory in Kristianstad in 1977. During 1980-1981 Reuterswärd did one prototype of a life size firearm in plaster and one in bronze. These are now kept in the collection of Museum of Sketches for Public Art in Lund.

The oversized public version of the piece was planned for John Lennon’s memorial Strawberry Fields in Central Park. This sculpture was made 1984, but when the memorial was opened in 1985 Reuterswärd opted not to have it placed there, citing fears it would be stolen. In 1988, the Luxembourg government bought and donated it to the United Nations. The sculpture was moved right outside of the headquarters of the UN. Here it was interpreted not only a memorial for John Lennon, but as a symbol against violence and war anywhere in the world.

Following the unveiling of the original sculpture, Reuterswärd did a range of replicas of Non Violence for places around the world, numbering about 30 sculptures. About half of these are in Sweden.

Aside from the public pieces, Reuterswärd made plenty of variations of the sculpture in smaller or life sized scale. In 2012 he donated a collection of pieces like this to the city museum in Landskrona.

Since 1993, the sculpture has been the symbol of The Non-Violence Project (NVPF), a nonprofit organization that promotes social change through violence-prevention education programs. In 2011, Ringo Starr unveiled his own brightly colored version of The Knotted Gun that he created. Later, more colour versions were made by Paul McCartney, Yoko Ono and other celebrities.

For the 30th anniversary of the sculpture, the NVPF and the art dealer Hansen Fine Art launched a foot-long version of the sculpture sold online. The United Nations Postal Administration issued three stamps depicting the sculpture. In 2019, the NVPF worked with the Dalai Lama to make 150 small-scale Non-Violence sculptures from melted confiscated firearms (Humanium Metal), including one copy signed by the Dalai Lama and auctioned at Sotheby's.

== Locations ==
There are currently more than 30 copies of the sculpture around the world. They are located in places such as :

N°	Country	Photo	City	Location	Since
1	Sweden		Malmö	Bagers plats	1992
2	Sweden		Stockholm	Sergelgatan	1995
3	Sweden		Gothenburg	Kungsportsavenyen	1997
4	Sweden		Gothenburg	Göteborgs Högre Samskola Stampgatan	
5	Sweden		Gothenburg	Göteborgs Högre Samskola Föreningsgatan	
6	Sweden		Borås	Anna Lindh park	
7	Sweden		Lund	The Museum of Sketches	2005
8	Sweden		Täby, Stockholm County	Täby Centrum station	1998
9	Sweden		Fittja, Stockholm County	Fittja metro station	1998
10	Sweden		Stockholm	Stockholm School of Economics	1998
11	Sweden		Stockholm	Sven-Harry's Art Museum	1998
12	Sweden		Stockholm	Åkeshov metro station	1998
13	Sweden		Halmstad	Brogatan	2014
14	Sweden		Halmstad	AJ Produkter Headquarter. Transportvägen	
15	Sweden		Tällberg	Green Hotel. Ovabacksgattu 17	
16	Sweden		Landskrona	Kasernplan	
17	USA (original piece)		New York City	Headquarters of the United Nations	1988
18	Luxembourg		Kirchberg	Parc Central	
19	China		Beijing	Chaoyang Park	
20	China		Nanjing	1865 Creative Park	
21	Germany		Berlin	Federal Chancellery	
22	Germany		Marl	Creiler Platz	1999
23	France		Caen	Mémorial de Caen	2005
24	Switzerland		Lausanne	Olympic Museum	1997
26	South Africa		Cape Town	Victoria & Alfred Waterfront	
26	Mexico		Naucalpan	Mexipuerto Shopping Mall at Cuatro Caminos metro station	
27	Mexico		Mexico City	683 Calle Ferrocarril de Cuarnavaca, Polanco	
28	India		Chennai	Perambur, ICF	
29	Georgia		Rukhi	Senaki - Leselidze Highway	
30	Lebanon		Beirut	Seafront	2018
31	United Kingdom (Northern Ireland)		Belfast	Girdwood Community Hub; Gift from the Olsson family	2019
32	Åland		Mariehamn	Självstyrelseparken, Mariehamn. Gift from Anders Wiklöf	2022

== See also ==
- International Day of Non-Violence
- Nonviolence
