= Sandro Calvani =

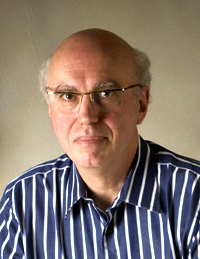
- Born: 1952 (age 73–74); Genoa, Italy

Sandro Calvani (born 1952) is the Senior Adviser on Strategic Planning for the Mae Fah Luang Foundation (under Royal Patronage), Bangkok, Thailand.

He dedicated his entire professional life to studying innovation, creativity, the effective methods of change management, conflict management and prevention. In countries where he worked, Calvani has given priority to strengthen freedom and justice that he considers the two greatest expressions of individual rights and collective rights.

== Career ==
Calvani began his professional career in 1976 at the University of Genoa, Italy, as a young researcher affiliated with the National Research Council, engaged with extra-nuclear genetics studies of single-celled organisms. In 1978 he was one of the youngest winners of a Fulbright Hays scholarship to advance his studies at Colorado State University (CSU) in Fort Collins, Colorado, USA. During his work as a visiting scientist at the Natural Resources Ecology Laboratory, CSU, he became interested in issues of sustainable rural development and completed one of his first book Third World Prophet to disseminate complex issues of sustainable development in poor countries. Back in Italy in 1979, as a volunteer expert of the Italian Caritas he became interested in the emerging topic of migrations across the Mediterranean and opened in the Genoese harbour the first center providing facilities for foreigners and illegal migrants in a seaport, in collaboration with the then Anti-terrorism Prefect extraordinary General Carlo Alberto Dalla Chiesa.

In 1980 he was chosen as the first lay leader of the Italian Caritas and as the first head of the Caritas department for international humanitarian aid and sustainable development. He contributed to the national campaign for the reception of boat people fleeing from Southeast Asia after the Vietnam War; he contributed to the first national law on conscience objection to the use of small arms and weapons and to the creation of the first courses for the objectors to military service.

Following the severe earthquake in Irpinia in November 1980 Calvani helped to create the first European relief network for natural disasters, in collaboration with Guido Bertolaso. For two years Calvani coordinated the foreign aid of churches all over the world to support victims of the earthquake in southern Italy. Calvani in 1982 was elected representative of the Italian foreign aid NGOs at the Directorate General for Development Cooperation of the Italian Ministry of Foreign Affairs and at the European Commission and the European Parliament in Brussels. In the 1980s Calvani worked with advocacy campaigns against hunger in the world designed by the Radical Party and the summer schools for advanced training on the values of politics, in cooperation with Romano Prodi.

In eight years as head of the largest Italian foreign aid agency Calvani has designed selected and monitored hundreds of sustainable development programs and raised the financial resources to implement them in more than 60 poor countries, which he visited to help create a strong local leadership for sustainable development.

In conjunction with ACLI, Calvani created solidarity and study-research campaigns on developing countries. A milestone campaign, called A well, a queen bee and a lemon inspired hundreds of research in action initiatives on the North-South inequality. In 1975, Calvani conceived the title of the first Italian public opinion campaign on ethical consumption, the environment, recycling and global justice called Against hunger change your lifestyle. Calvani helped to create institutions with people participation on development aid, such as Magis, GMA, IPSIA, CEM and others.

Since 1982 Sandro Calvani became one of the first Italian education leaders on global development and interculturalism through a series of articles entitled From the poor we learn, the school diary Diary of a unique world and through his first books on the Third World, as The Third World, who is he, Poor today, poor tomorrow, Does aid help?, and various books of the first Small Encyclopaedia of Development. Calvani helped the birth of the first experiences of consumption and shopping through fair trade, especially in southern Italy.

In 1988 Calvani was chosen by the World Health Organization (WHO) as the founder and first director of the WHO Pan-African Center for Disaster Preparedness, based in Addis Ababa, Ethiopia. The Center created the first WHO programs for prevention and management of disasters in Africa and contributed to experiment with the first best practices of civil protection in Africa. When the Ethiopian dictator Mengistu Haile Mariam arrested and tortured a WHO official, Calvani was the first WHO diplomat to report the human rights abuse of an African dictator, providing evidence to Amnesty International and the Fifth Committee of the UN General Assembly. The WHO official, released two years later after the fall of Mengistu, said in a public speech that the international outcry over her case had saved her life.

In 1991 Calvani became the youngest director of the WHO African region based in Brazzaville, Congo, charged with coordinating the UN agencies working on public health, scientific research and health libraries in the forty four countries of Sub-Saharan Africa.

In 1992 Calvani was seconded to the newly formed anti-drug agency of the United Nations as a representative and director of the office in Bolivia. He helped to strengthen the Bolivian rural development program by promoting alternative crops to replace coca production. The program, with a record budget of US$45 million, became the largest UN crop replacement program at that time.

In those years, Calvani began various studies and research on traditional uses of coca and on the discovery of cocaine, which were then published in several books in several languages including: The prophecy of coca, The other side of coca, A sea of coca, Coca, myths and realities.

Between 1995 and 1999 Calvani was appointed Regional Director of the same United Nations Drugs and Crime Program for the Caribbean and later became the Program's Representative to the European institutions in Brussels. During that period, in collaboration with General Mc Caffrey, anti-drug czar of the United States in the first Clinton administration, Calvani conceived the Barbados Plan of Action, the first comprehensive regional program to control and prevent drug trafficking. The Plan involved more than forty countries in the Caribbean or with strategic interests in the region.

In 1999 Calvani became regional Director for South-East Asia and the Pacific of the UN anti-drug and anti-crime agency, based in Bangkok, with responsibility over thirty countries in the region, including China, Malaysia, Singapore, Indonesia, Japan, Korea, Australia, Vietnam, Philippines, Myanmar, Cambodia and Laos. Calvani created the first international plan to control and prevent drug trafficking around China, called ACCORD, Asean and China Cooperative Operations in Response to Dangerous Drugs, which still exists after several transformations. At the beginning of the new century Calvani was unanimously appointed as the coordinator of UN programs against Hiv-AIDS for South-East Asia and the Pacific. In 2001, in collaboration with a local NGO in Indonesia, Calvani created the first popular program with the media Lights On (Turn on the light) to inform young people about the risks of using illegal drugs. The program caught for the first time the drivers attention with the idea of turning the car lights on at noon, even under the tropical sun, just to clarify all the taboos of drugs.

Since 2004 Calvani became Director of UNODC (United Nations Program on Drugs and Crime) in Colombia based in Bogotá. Under Calvani's leadership the program became the largest UN program to replace illicit crops in the world, with several local offices, hundreds of employees and an extensive program of satellite monitoring of coca crops. The program of illicit crops in Colombia is expanding to more than 60,000 families guardabosques, families that preserve the environment and cultivate forest products as an alternative to coca. Some food products such as cocoa, honey and coffee, then obtained the cooperation of Good Food and other projects of the Community of San Patrignano in Italy. Calvani promoted innovative programs for public-private partnership including a series of episodes for the large audience TV soap opera Todos Quieren con Marilyn for public information on trafficking in persons, conceived and executed with Adriana Ruiz-Restrepo. Calvani designed a program of music events against trafficking in weapons inspired by an escopetarra, an AK-47 converted into electric guitar, in collaboration with the Colombian musician César López.

In July 2007 Calvani was appointed by UN Secretary General Ban Ki-moon new director of UNICRI (United Nations Interregional Crime and Justice Research Institute). His tenure of appointment ended in April 2010. UNICRI products include the first UN report on counterfeiting, the first manual of Criminal Procedure for International Tribunals, the Master LLM on international crime and justice, the report on environmental crimes, the international magazine Freedom From Fear, the innovative program on land rights in cooperation with Terra Madre and Slow Food, the program of public-private partnerships on security of major events and the knowledge management system for risks from CBRN (chemical, biological, radiological and nuclear) substances.

In 2008 Calvani became Chairman of the Global Agenda Council on Illicit Trade, an initiative of the World Economic Forum. He later joined the Global Agenda Council on Poverty of the World Economic Forum.

During his career Calvani has participated in specialized courses on leadership development at Harvard University (Cambridge, Massachusetts) and the management of major health emergencies in Leuven (Belgium). He received several awards for professional excellence in every continent of the world.

From September 2010 to June 2013 Calvani served as Executive Director of the ASEAN Center of Excellence on United Nations Millennium Development Goals (ARCMDG) at the Asian Institute of Technology (AIT) in Bangkok, Thailand and facilitated other AIT outreach activities such as social business and Corporate Social Responsibility with the AIT Yunus Center, CSR Asia Center as well as AIT international networking and fundraising efforts. ARCMDG cooperated with UN and ASEAN bodies in the facilitation of best practices to achieve the UN Millennium Development Goals.

== Publications ==
Calvani has published 29 books and over 800 articles on topics of sustainable development, human rights, crime, justice. Major newspapers and magazines like The Economist, The Miami Herald, El País, Herald Tribune, Bangkok Post, El Tiempo, The Nation, The Jakarta Post have published interviews with Dr. Calvani.
