= Mémorial de Caen =

Le Mémorial de Caen
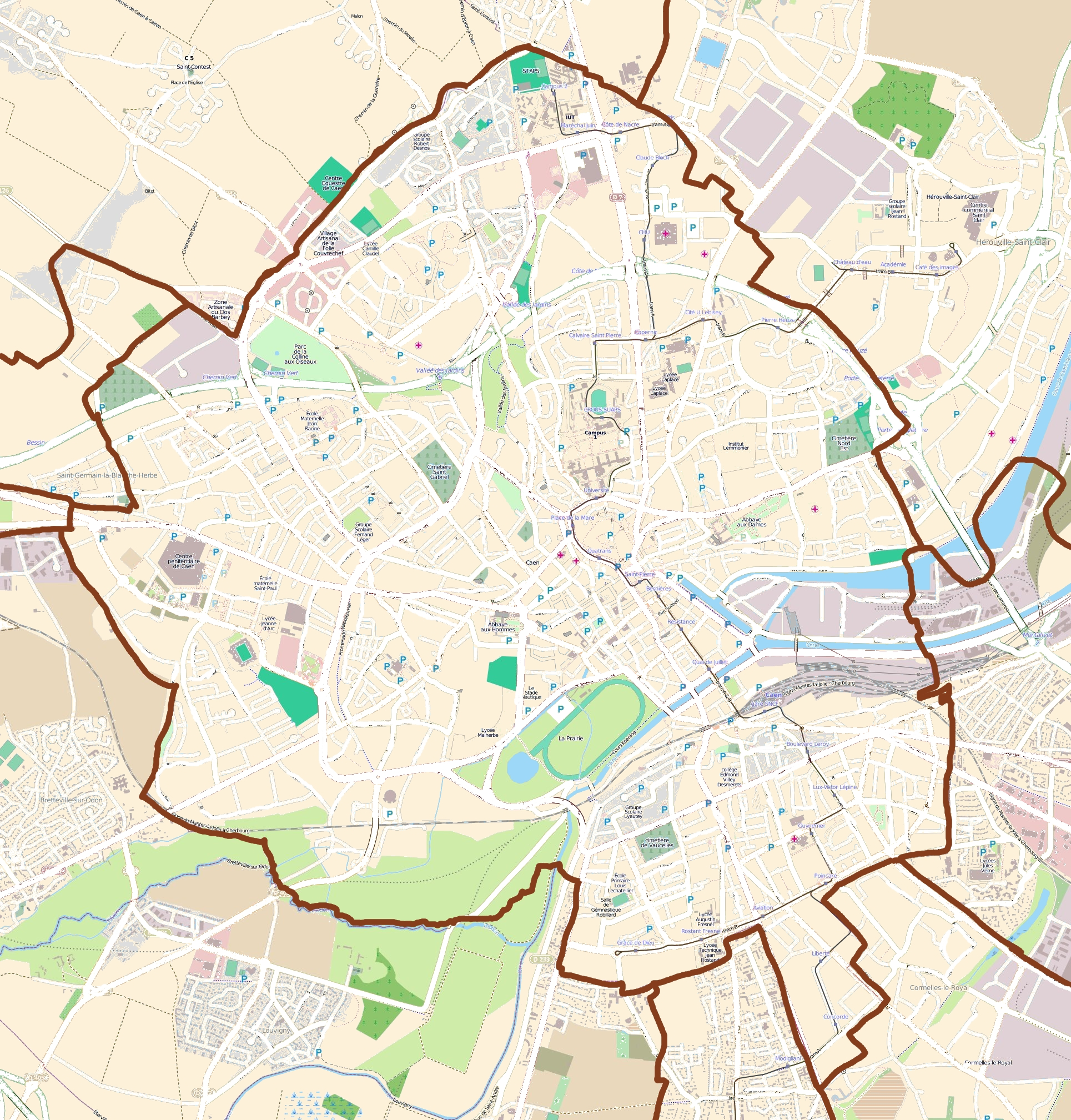
- Location within Caen
- Established: 1989
- Location: Esplanade Eisenhower, BP 55026, 14050 Caen Cedex 4
- Coordinates: 49.197438°N 0.384135°W
- Type: peace museum, war memorial
- Visitors: 400,000 (2007)
- Public transit access: no 2 bus (terminus)
- Website: Caen Memorial website.

The Mémorial de Caen is a museum and war memorial in Caen, Normandy, France commemorating World War II and the Battle for Caen. More generally, the museum is dedicated to the history of the twentieth century, mainly focused on the fragility of peace. Its intention is "pay a tribute to the martyred city of the liberation" but also to tell "what was the terrible story of the 20th century in a spirit of reconciliation".

== Site ==
The building and grounds are located in the northern suburbs of the city of Caen on the site of an old blockhouse. The architect was Jacques Millet and the original curator was Yves Degraine. On entrance of the building is written: "The pain broke me, the fraternity relieved me, of my wound sprang a river of freedom" (sentence by Paul Dorey, local poet who speaks in the name of Normandy). In front of the entrance, we can see the flags of the main nations involved in the Battle of Normandy, and "Non-violence", a sculpture by Swedish artist Carl Fredrik Reuterswärd.

The memorial is dedicated to the history of violence and intensive, outstanding conflicts in the 20th Century and particularly World War II. The museum was officially opened on June 6, 1988 (the 44th anniversary of D-Day) by the French President François Mitterrand. The original building deals primarily with World War II, looking at the causes and course of the conflict.

The museum was subsequently extended:

- In 1991 a gallery dedicated to the Nobel Peace Prize was added
- Three memorial gardens, The American Garden, The British Garden and the Canadian Garden were dedicated to the three main allied nations involved in liberating France
- An extension focusing on the Cold War and the search for Peace was opened by President Jacques Chirac in 2002. It comprises neutralized warheads, planes and a fragment of the Berlin Wall.

== Gallery ==
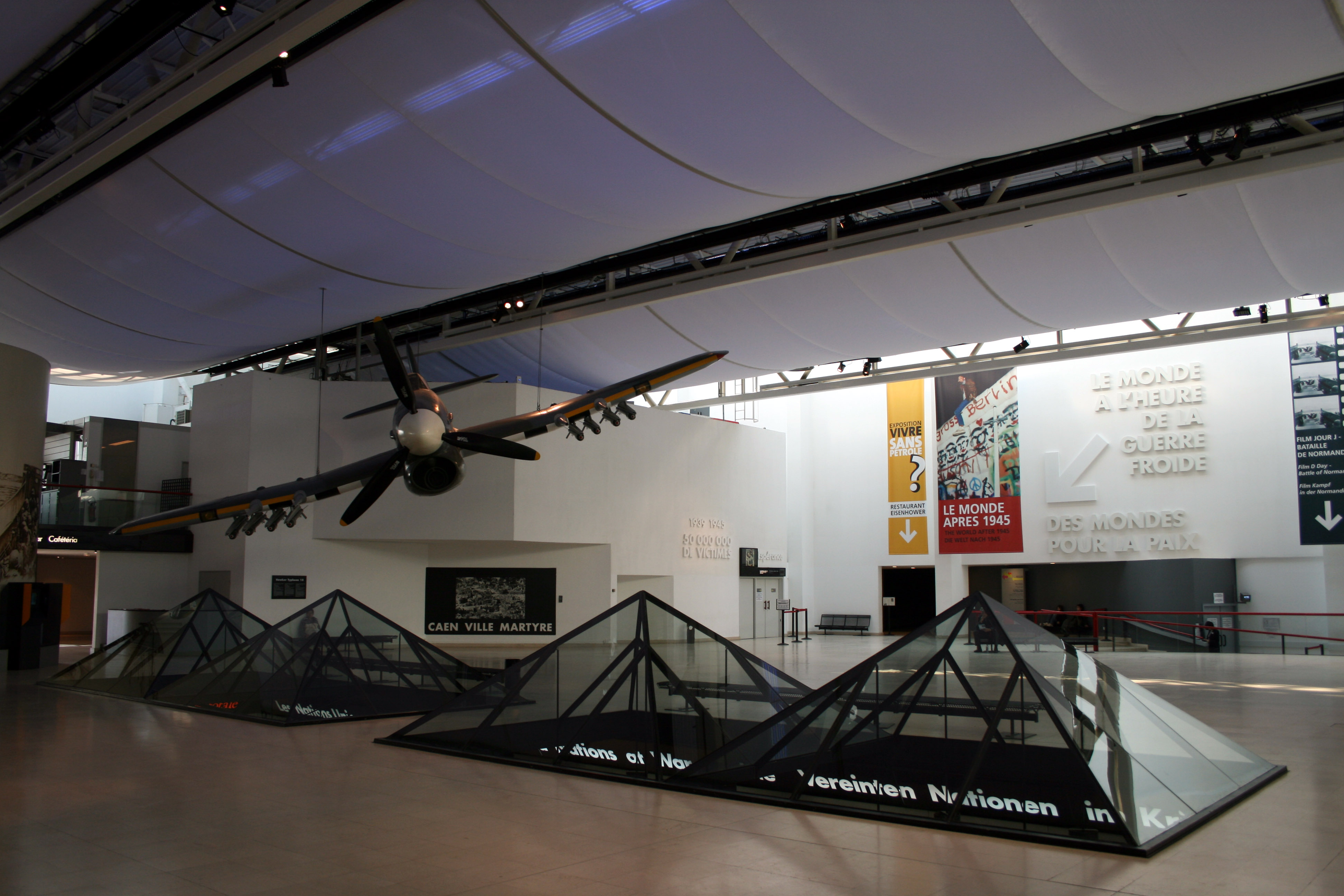
Hall

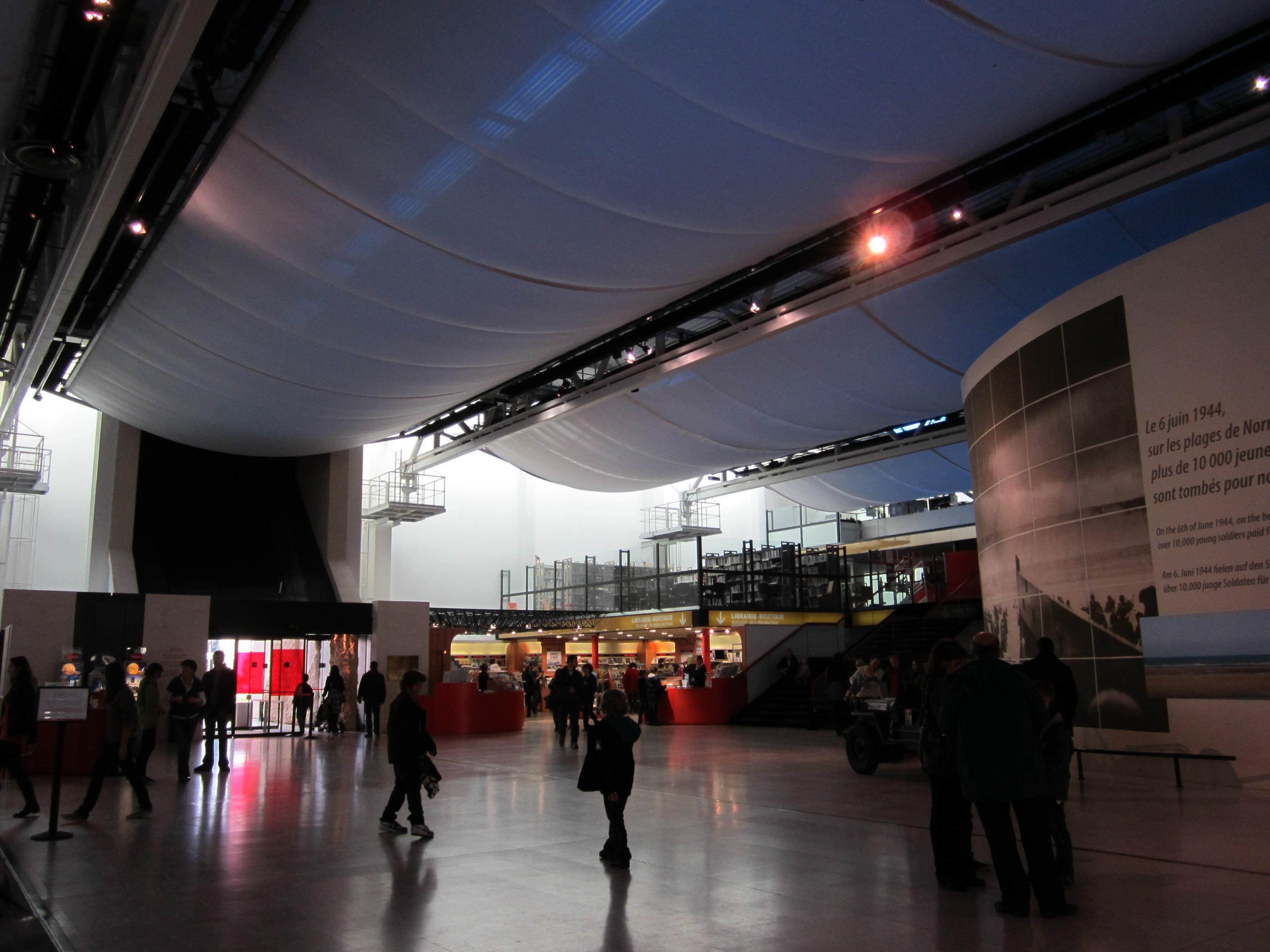
Foyer

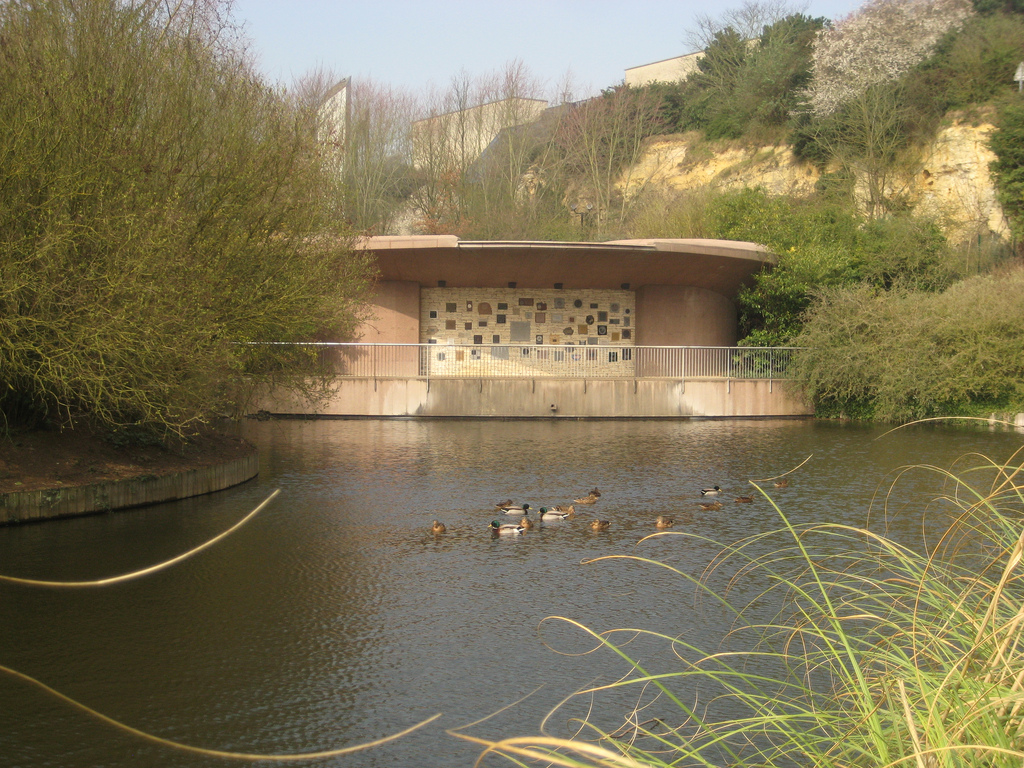
American Garden

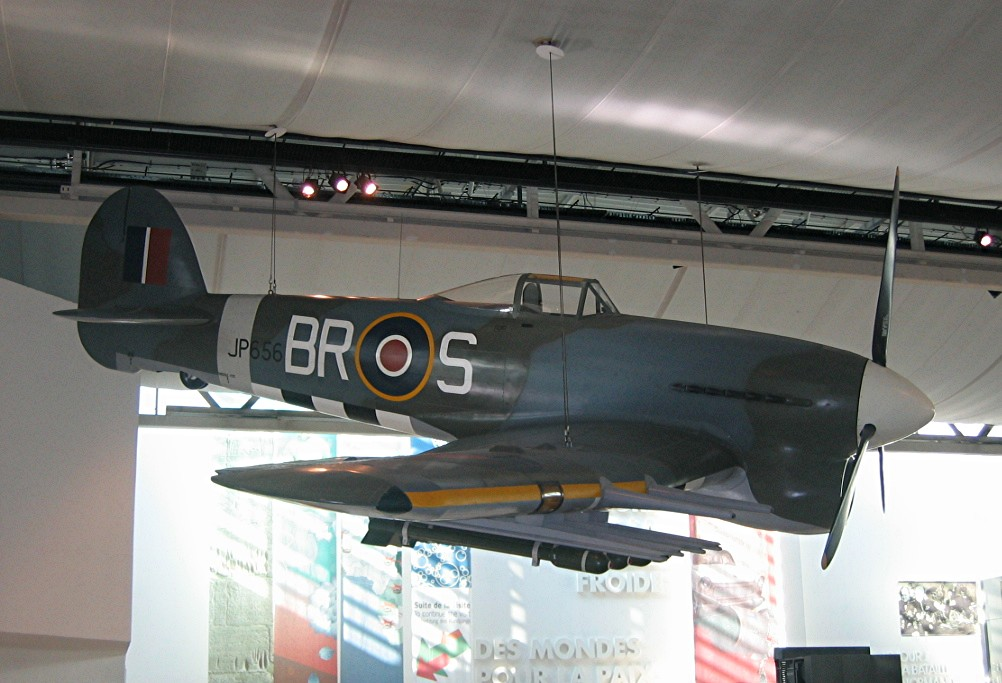
Hawker Typhoon ground-attack aircraft at Mémorial

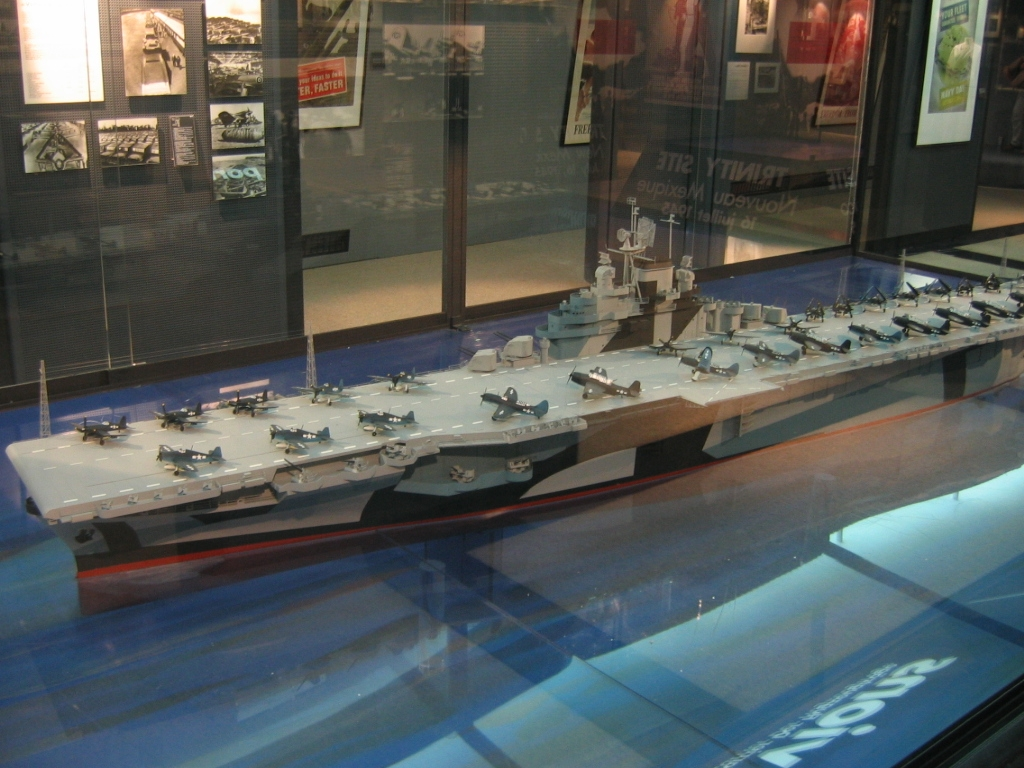
Model of U.S. aircraft carrier

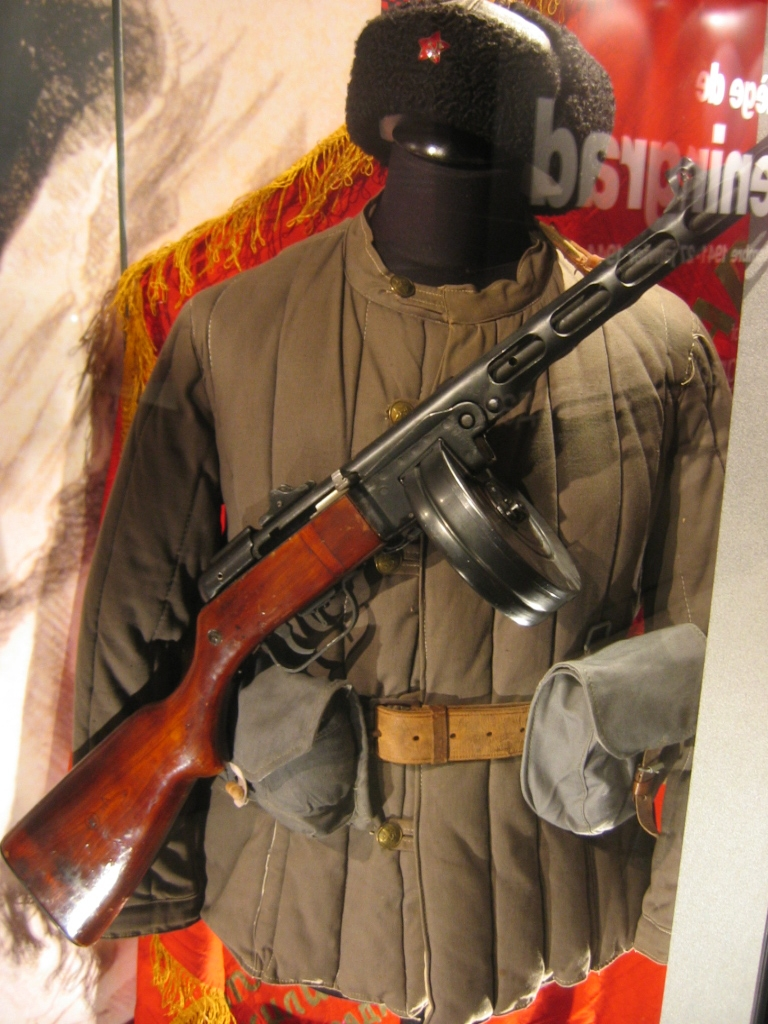
Soviet army uniform (1939–1945) with PPSh-41 submachine gun

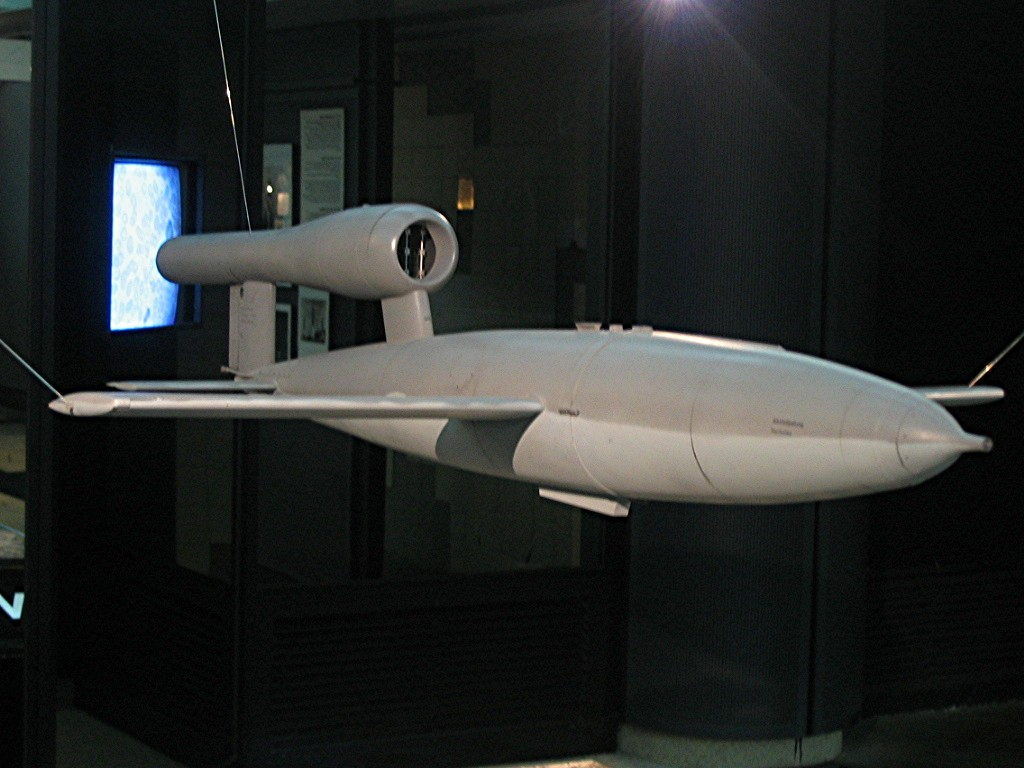
Model of German V1 flying bomb
