= Calvani =

Calvani is an Italian surname. Notable people with the surname include:

- Gabriele Calvani (born 2004), Italian footballer
- Luca Calvani (born 1974), Italian actor
- Marco Calvani (born 1980), Italian playwright, director, translator and actor
- Sandro Calvani (born 1952), Italian humanitarian
- Terry Calvani (born 1947), American lawyer, former government official and university professor
