= César López =

César López may refer to:

- César López (Colombian musician) (born 1973)
- César López (Mexican musician) (born 1968), Mexican rock guitarist
- César López Fretes (1923–2001), football striker from Paraguay
- César López, Cuban writer, winner of the Cuban National Prize for Literature
