= Humanium Metal =

Metal created from recycled firearms

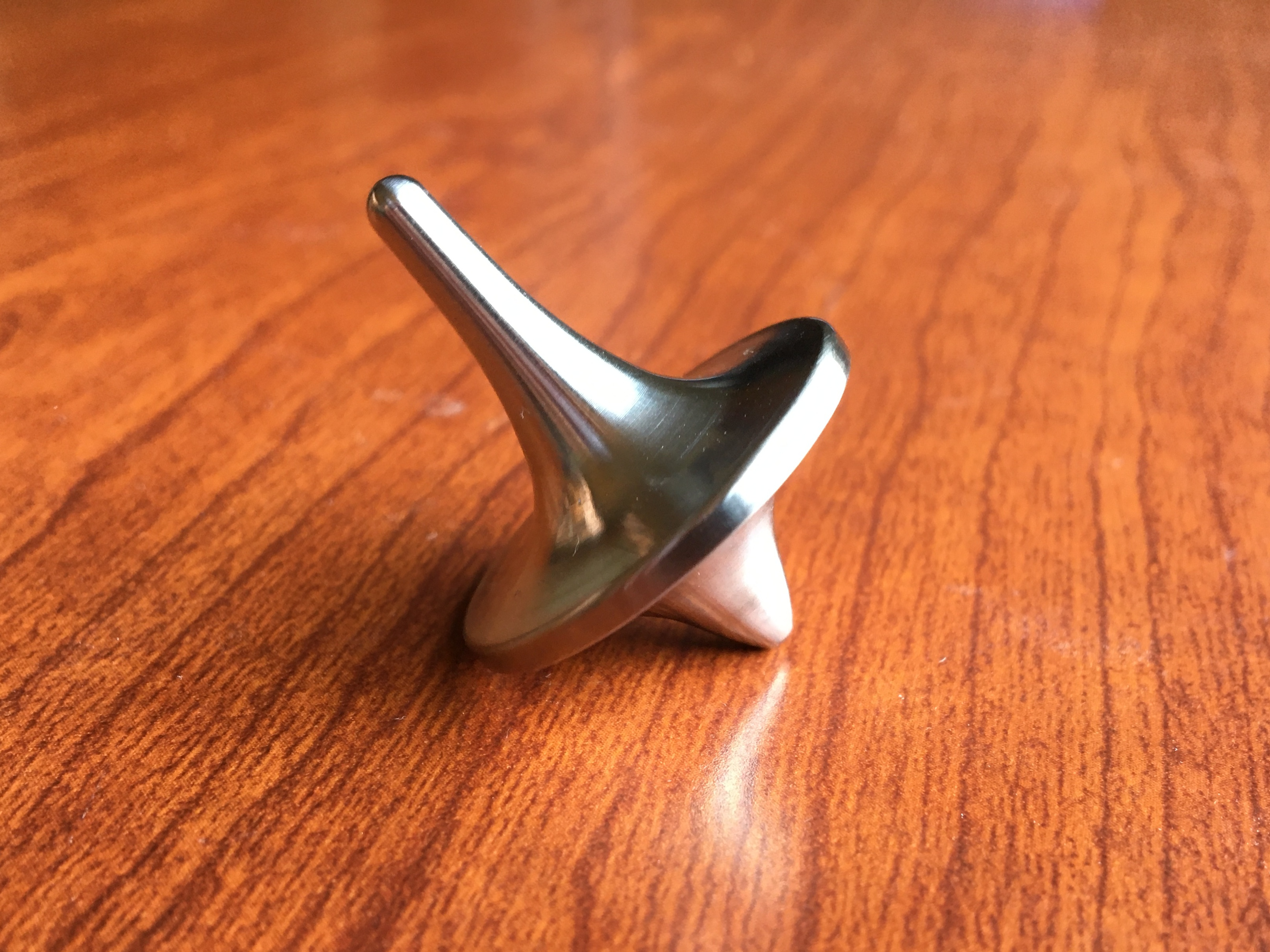
A ForeverSpin spinning top made of Humanium Metal

Humanium Metal is a brand of metal made by melting down illegal firearms seized in conflict zones. The creation and distribution of this metal is done through a marketing campaign called "The Humanium Metal Initiative", started in 2016 by Swedish nonprofit organization IM Swedish Development Partner. The stated objective of the program is to draw attention to issues of gun violence and contribute toward the ending of illegal firearms trade. Humanium Metal is used for the creation of non-lethal commodities, such as wristwatches, buttons, and spinning tops, with proceeds returning to violence prevention efforts and support for gun-violence survivors in the areas from which the firearms were seized.

== History ==
The Humanium Metal Initiative was developed by Peter Brune of IM Swedish Development Partner in partnership with designer Johan Pihl. The objective of Humanium Metal is "to spread awareness of the devastating impact of illegal firearms and armed violence, as well as generate funds urgently needed to empower people living in conflict-torn societies." The campaign is implemented in conjunction with Swedish advertising agencies Great Works and Akestam Holst.

Humanium Metal was first produced in November 2016 in El Salvador, where firearms seized by the Salvadoran government were converted into one ton of metal. The project has since expanded to Guatemala, and, as of 2018, it plans to expand to Honduras and Colombia.

The program has received endorsements from the Dalai Lama, former director general of the International Atomic Energy Agency Hans Blix, and Nobel Peace Prize winner Desmond Tutu. The program has also partnered with the Swedish Ministry for Foreign Affairs.

According to the organization's website, as of end of 2022, the program had destroyed more than 12,000 firearms in El Salvador, Zambia and the United States.

== Production and use ==
The most common method for producing Humanium Metal is when governments seize illegal firearms and melt down their metal, turning it into ingots, wire, or pellets. The metal is 95% iron and is sent to Sweden, where they are reduced to powder that can be used in the production of metal objects. As of 2018, Humanium Metal was priced at about $6.60 per ounce. In 2018, Stockholm-based watchmaker TRIWA began to market wristwatches 3D-printed with Humanium Metal. In 2019, the Humanium Metal Initiative partnered with The Non-Violence Project Foundation to produce small-scale replicas of Swedish artist Carl Fredrik Reuterswärd's 1985 sculpture Non-Violence. Other companies have produced spinning tops, buttons, and bracelets made from Humanium Metal. A Good Company has made a limited-edition A Good Humanium Metal pen, 25% of the sales of which goes to support projects tackling violent crime and rebuilding conflicted-afflicted communities in El Salvador.

In 2020, Scottish artist Frank To created paintings using powdered Humanium Metal mixed with paint.

In December 2020, IM partnered with the Zambia Police Service to destroy more than 6,000 firearms and turn them into Humanium Metal.

In 2021, the police department of Falmouth, Maine publicly destroyed a set of illegal weapons and announced their intention to turn them into Humanium Metal.

== Awards ==
In 2017, the Humanium Metal Initiative won the Grand Prix for Innovation at the Cannes Lions Festival for Creativity. In 2018, the program won the advertising category of Fast Company's 2018 World Changing Ideas Awards.
