= Souriya Sunshine =

Thai peace activist and musician

Souriya Sunshine (born Souriya Tawancha, c. 1946) is a Thai peace activist and musician who tries to mediate between the Muslim rebels in the south of Thailand and the Thai government. He plays a guitar in the form of an AK-47 Kalashnikov machine gun.

In 2005 the Buddhist musician moved from his native Issan to the southern province Narathiwat near the Malaysian border to act as an intermediary. He says that by playing nostalgic Thai songs to them with his guitar, he was able to convince over 200 insurgents to surrender to the police, providing a save environment where the insurgents can negotiate favorable terms with the government. In 2005 he negotiated along with an adviser to then Thai prime minister Thaksin Shinawatra with a Muslim cleric living in Malaysia who had contacts with the insurgents. In a 2006 article he was quoted as saying "the problem is that the government does not understand Muslim ways of life in the south. We need more communication and understanding of each other."

Souriya raises money for his "Flowers 'n' Paperbirds for Peace Foundation" by selling merchandise.

Souriya's instrument is an AK-47 rifle stock and magazine attached to the neck of a regular 6 string electric guitar, with an ammunition belt serving as guitar strap. Guns including AK-47's turned into guitars as peace symbols have also been used by Colombian musician and peace activist César López with his escopetarras.
