= Elisabeth Barnekow =

Swedish painter

Brita Elisabeth Gabriella Barnekow (8 February 1874, in Sörby – 2 October 1942, in Stockholm) was a Swedish painter, best remembered for her portrait paintings. Her works have been exhibited at the Nationalmuseum and the Museum of Sketches for Public Art.
