= Micael Bindefeld =

Swedish event and party organiser

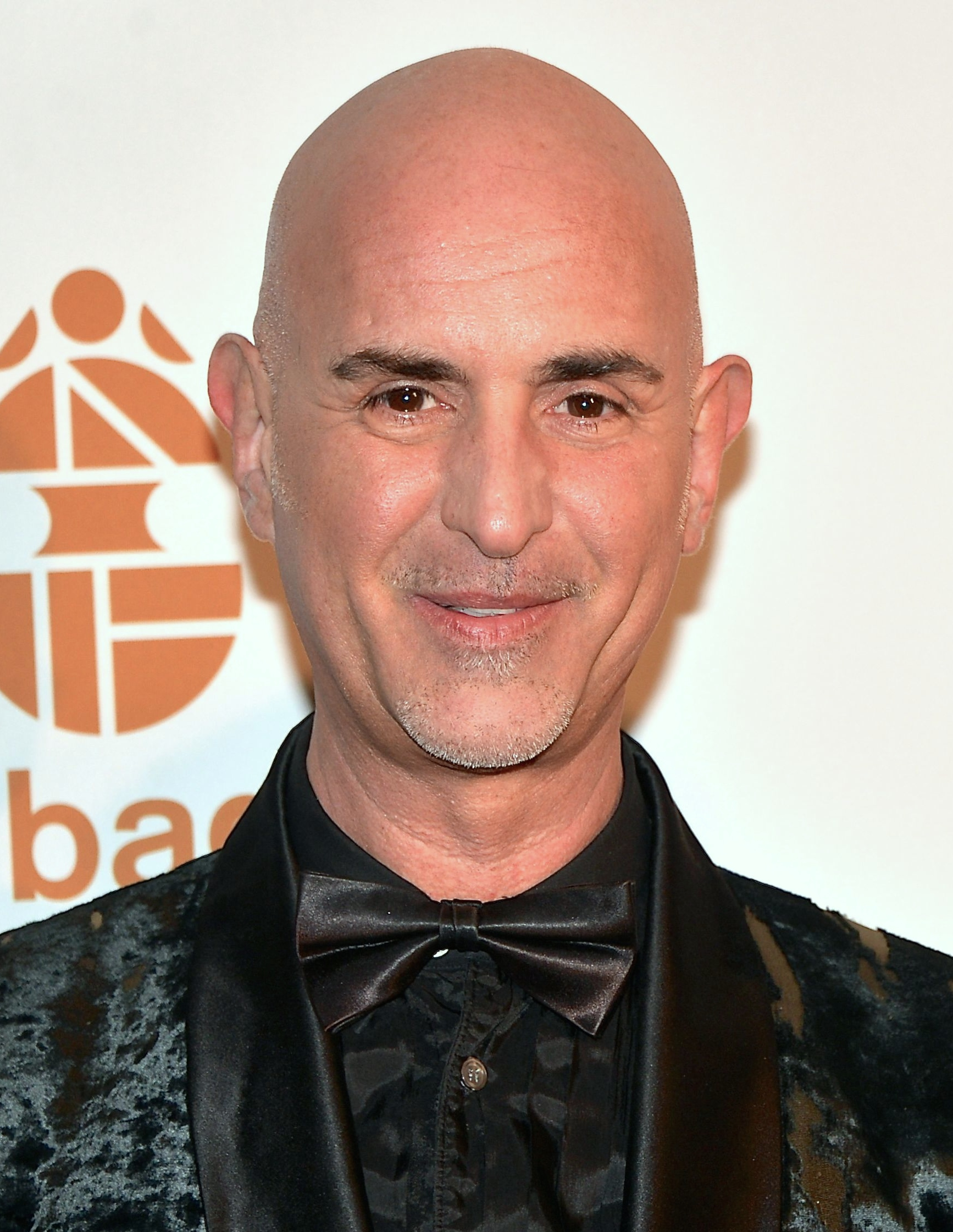
- Micael Bindefeld during the Guldbaggen Awards in January 2013
- Born: 20 September 1959 (age 66); Gothenburg, Sweden
- Education: Göteborgs Högre Samskola
- Occupations: hairdresser, event organizer
- Spouse: Nicklas Sigurdsson
- Children: 1

Micael Bindefeld (born 20 September 1959) is a Swedish event and party organiser. Bindefeld grew up in a Jewish middle-class family in Gothenburg. His father was an engineer and his mother was a dental nurse. In his youth he went to Göteborgs Högre Samskola.

Bindefeld educated himself to be a hairdresser; he became popular and started doing hair for celebrities in Stockholm. He organized his first event in 1987, and since then Bindefeld has evolved from creator and party organiser to communications strategist.

He played himself in the films Adam & Eva (1997) and Livet är en schlager (2000).

He hosted Sommar i P1, which was broadcast on Sveriges Radio in 2010. In 2014 he started the Micael Bindefeld foundation for the memory of the Holocaust. Bindefeld himself is Jewish and had relatives who were killed in the Holocaust.

== Personal life ==
Bindefeld is married to Nicklas Sigurdsson and has a son born in 2016 through surrogacy.

== Controversies ==
In connection with his 60th birthday in 2019, Bindefeld held a week-long birthday party in Tel Aviv, Israel, where he invited several Swedish celebrities, leading politicians and others whom he described as his friends. Among those who accepted the invitation were Ulf Kristersson (leader of the Moderate Party), Ebba Busch Thor (leader of the Christian Democrats) and Nyamko Sabuni (leader of the Liberals), who were strongly criticised by political commentators and others for accepting the invitation. Critics held the view that they should have stayed and worked in the Riksdag, as it was in the middle of budget time.

It was reported that several prosecutors would investigate if there had been any bribery involved. Bindefeld responded by saying: "I don't need to comment it, reflect over it or care about it. I'm only celebrating my birthday".
