= The Non-Violence Project =

Non-profit organization

Non-Violence Project
- Founded: 1993
- Founders: Jan Hellman, Rolf Skjöldebrand
- Type: Educational non-profit organisation
- Purpose: Education, Non-violence, Peace
- Headquarters: CH 1227 Geneva, Switzerland
- Method: Education, violence prevention
- CEO: Blaise Oberson
- Key people: Jan Hellman (Chairman, Founder), Rolf Skjoldebrand (Founder), Claes Cronstedt, Jens Holm
- Website: nonviolence.com

The Non-Violence Project Foundation (NVP) is a non-profit organization whose mission is to inspire, motivate, and engage young people on how to solve conflicts peacefully. It holds violence prevention and nonviolence education programs for schools and sports clubs around the world.

The Non-Violence Project Foundation, which was registered in 1993 in Bagnes, Switzerland, and has currently offices in 11 countries around the world. Its logo is the iconic Knotted Gun sculpture named Non-Violence. It has educated eight million students, teachers, and sports coaches with programs covering three main subjects: conflict management, self-esteem building, and nonviolence. Sir Paul McCartney, Ringo Starr and Yoko Ono are, among others, ambassadors of the Non-Violence Project.

== The symbol ==
The Non-Violence Project Foundation's signature logo is the Non-Violence sculpture, also known as the Knotted Gun. It was created by Swedish artist Carl Fredrik Reuterswärd as a memorial tribute to John Lennon after he was shot and killed on December 8, 1980, in New York City. One of the three original bronze sculptures is displayed at the United Nations headquarters in New York City, the Knotted Gun has become a worldwide symbol of the non-violence movement. Several replicas of this sculpture can be found around the world, including the Olympic Museum in Lausanne, at Victoria & Alfred Waterfront in Cape Town and in the Chaoyang Park in Beijing, China.

== History ==
=== Establishment ===
The Non-Violence Project Foundation was born with the idea to use non-violence to inspire, motivate and engage the young community in positive action and give them the tools and skills to solve conflicts peacefully. In 1993, Jan Hellman and Rolf Skjöldebrand founded the Non-Violence Project. They believed that the best way to achieve the non-violence mission was to convince schools and sports clubs to include violence prevention and life skills programs into their basic education schedule. The Non-Violence Project Foundation's concept was first piloted in Sweden with great success. NVP invited the business community to partner in their endeavor and toured roughly 100 cities, spreading the non-violence message. A year later, NVP had reached 100,000 students and initiated 300 local projects in Sweden. In 1995, a crowd of people gathered at the Sergel's Square in central Stockholm, lighting candles in the shape of the Knotted Gun. Several celebrities participated at the event, such as model Emma Wiklund, singer Siw Malmkvist, Lill-Babs and the actress Lena Olin. The television host Kristin Kaspersen organized the event.

=== Worldwide development ===
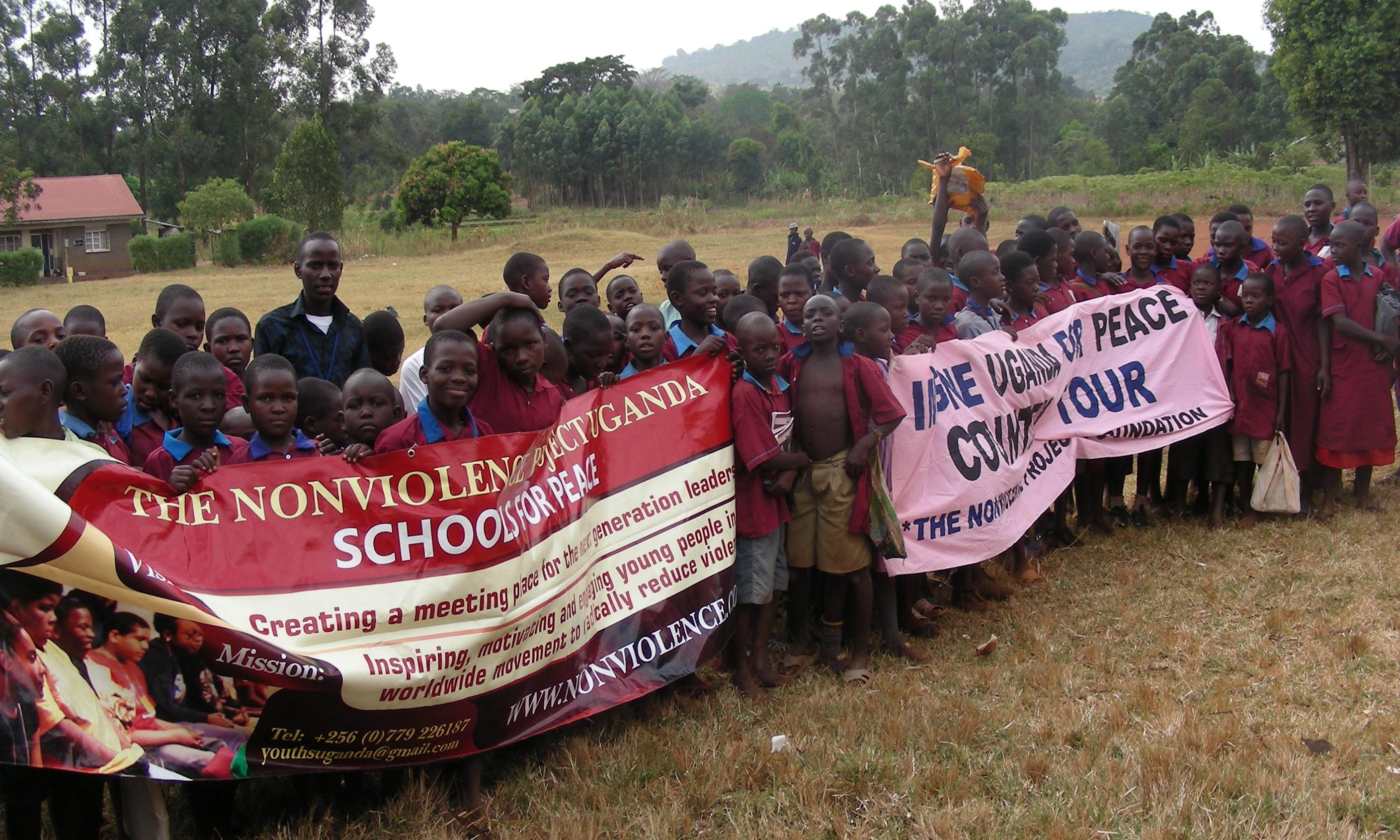
Schools for Peace, NVP Uganda, 2011

Over the years, NVP has increased its international activities from 10 to 31 countries on five continents around the world including the United States of America, the United Kingdom, Brazil, South Africa, Japan, China, Pakistan, Mexico, Sweden, Uganda, Peru, Guatemala, Tanzania, the Bahamas, Liberia, Kenya, Italy and India. The headquarters are in Geneva, Switzerland.

In 2008, the first Knot Violence Campaign was launched in Portsmouth, United Kingdom, with the support of England soccer goalkeeper David James and the presence of local pupils. The campaign helped to introduce the Non-Violence Creativity Program into local schools. The initiative was an arts-based education program whose main tool was the Non-Violence Box. The box includes a violence prevention module as well as a one-meter fiberglass replica of the Knotted Gun. Students, teachers and sports coaches are challenged to give their interpretation of the symbol and of what it communicates. David James has worked closely with pupils from City of Portsmouth Boys' School to help them paint their own knotted gun sculptures. He also did his own interpretation which is displayed outside the Fratton Park stadium in Portsmouth. During the 2010 FIFA World Cup in South Africa, under the campaign theme "Futbol For Peace" and in close cooperation with the Western Cape and Gauteng Education Departments, NVP engaged several prominent football players such as the Italian goalkeeper Gianluigi Buffon, German captain Michael Ballack, Wilson Palacios from Honduras, Alex Song from Cameroon, Aaron Mokoena from South Africa and football legend Gus Poyet to paint and interpret the Non-Violence symbol. This became an exhibition at the Waterfront in Cape Town. The painted sculptures communicated a global vision of peace and non-violence and created awareness of the education programs which took place at several youth hubs and schools in Johannesburg and Cape Town. The campaign included daily football tournaments, violence prevention education, life skills training and a "Train the Trainer" program to secure continuity after the World Cup. In 2011, Gianluigi Buffon donated his self-designed Non-Violence sculpture to former South African President Nelson Mandela on Mandela Day, July 18, in recognition of his lifelong work to bring peace and non-violence in South Africa and the world.

== Education initiatives ==
NVP has educated and trained more than eight million students, teachers and sports coaches around the world. The NVP programs provide tools for schools and sports clubs to get started. The programs which cover three main subjects - conflict management, self-esteem building, and violence prevention - are constructed to inspire, motivate and engage teachers and students to increase their knowledge of how violence emerges, why conflicts escalate, the importance of a strong self-esteem, and the nonviolent keys to resolve conflicts in a peaceful way. The same approach is used to address the sports community. NVP focus on issues of non-violence, peace, youth participation, interactive exercises, life skills and community development.

The Train the Trainer Program works with teachers and sports coaches. The program attempts to give future trainers the competence and tools to implement the Non-Violence Project education model into their respective schools and sports clubs.

A pilot program has been done at the University of St Andrews, in Scotland and at the UNAM (Universidad Nacional Autónoma de México), in Mexico. The project NVP St Andrews was launched on October 3, 2012 at the University of St Andrews in presence of the golfer Dustin Johnson. University of Tsukuba in Japan started official education in 2018. The project equips university students with the tools to go out into their local communities and inspire conflict resolution and promote non-violence in schools and on playing fields.

== Imagine One Billion Faces For Peace (IOBFFP) ==
The Non-Violence Project launched a call for peace and non-violence online to honor the legacy of John Lennon and to strengthen the outreach of NVP education programs.

== The Non-Violence Tour ==
The Tour, featuring fiberglass Non-Violence sculptures interpreted and painted by children from throughout the world and by internationally renowned role models within sports, music and art, are displayed in cities around the world. The Tour promotes the presence of the Non-Violence Symbol and secures local distribution of the NVP education programs to schools and sports clubs. The former UN Secretary General Kofi Annan stated;

"The Non-Violence Symbol has not only endowed the United Nations with a cherished work of art; it has enriched the consciousness of humanity with a powerful symbol. It is a symbol that encapsulates, in a few simple curves, the greatest prayer of man: that which asks not for victory, but for peace".

== Ambassadors ==
- Artist and peace activist Yoko Ono
- The Beatles members: Paul McCartney and Ringo Starr
- French artist Zoe Clauzure
- Football players: Lionel Messi, Gianluigi Buffon, David James, Michael Ballack, Aaron Mokoena, Gus Poyet, Alexandre Song, Wilson Palacios and Didier Zokora
- Tennis player Robin Söderling
- Singers: Wei Wei, Anahí, Derrick Green, Vazquez Sounds
- Boxer Amir Khan
- Golfer Dustin Johnson
- Artists: Ernst Billgren, Gregory Fink and Patricia Magano

== Regional NVP organizations ==
During the last 20 years, NVP settled regional offices in 17 countries around the world including the USA, the UK, Brazil, Mexico, Sweden, Denmark, Uganda, South Africa, Japan, China, India, Pakistan, Russia, Peru, Colombia, Guatemala, Tanzania, the Bahamas, Liberia, Kenya and Italy. Since 2017, the headquarters is in Geneva, Switzerland.

Non Violence Project Foundation India (NVPF India) is the India chapter of The Non-Violence Project Foundation. The mission is to inspire, engage and motivate young people towards peace, sustainability, non violence and make this world a better place to live in.

== See also ==
- List of peace activists
- List of anti-war organizations
