= Göteborgs Högre Samskola =

Location
- Gothenburg; Sweden
- Coordinates: 57°42′41.15″N 11°59′26.38″E

Information
- Type: Independent
- Established: 1901
- Rector: Egil Gry
- Nickname: Sam, Samskolan
- Website: www.samskolan.se

Göteborgs Högre Samskola is an independent school in Gothenburg, Sweden.

== Information ==
In 2006 the school had about 1350 students. The school has students aged 5 through 19 and has a Förskola, a Grundskola and a Gymnasium. The school consists of a series of buildings for the younger grades 1 through 6 and a separate building for middle school and high school students. The school for the children in grade 1–6 is situated in central Gothenburg on Föreningsgatan 12-17 and is known as Lilla Sam. The other part consists of two large buildings situated on Stampgatan. These buildings are known as Stora Sam. The longtime rector, Alar Randsalu, retired in the spring of 2007 and was succeeded by Peter Järvsén, formerly rector of Frölundagymnasiet.

== History ==
The school's interior

Overlooking one of the parking lots.

The school was established in 1901, and was one of the first coeducation schools in Gothenburg, and the first one with mixed classes in High school. It was non-denominational, so many Jewish families sent their children to the school.

Samskolan is a prestigious school and is also believed to have an upper class profile. This is most likely because the school used to have a school fee, and this fee is mistakenly believed to be in existence to this day. Such fees are otherwise extremely rare in Sweden since in 1992 the Swedish government introduced a school voucher system where the government pays for each student, regardless of whether he attends a public school or a private school.

Notable people who have attended the school include:

- Henrik Berggren of Broder Daniel
- Arne Beurling
- Micael Bindefeld
- Rick Falkvinge
- Kelly Gale
- Pehr G. Gyllenhammar
- Håkan Hellström
- Felix Kjellberg (PewDiePie)
- Mikaela Parmlid
- Pelle Pettersson
- Timo Räisänen
- Ebba von Sydow

== Current ==
The school was mentioned in an article in the Swedish Metro newspaper on the cover page, saying that Göteborgs Högre Samskola was the best Grundskola school in Gothenburg. The average graduation score achieved by the school's students was 263.4 out of 320 possible. Comparing this with the closest communal school which had around 240, the students that are attending Samskolan achieve higher grades than the average.

Lilla Sam follows the teachings of Maria Montessori. Stora Sam gives its students the choice to decide for themselves what to do during SA for the Grundskola students or EA for the Gymnasie students. You get a logbook where you attain signatures for each SA or EA pass you attend, to make sure that you do not skip lessons. Typically during an EA pass you do your home work, whereas during SA hours you might prepare small projects (such as reading a novel and then do a write-up on it to be presented to a teacher of your choice). Lilla Sam utilizes a similar system but where the same teacher is always present.

Samskolan has an English speaking section, where students that are exceptionally good at English can study. The classes, often given an ending of an e or an E (e.g. 4e, 5e, 6e) currently only have a 5th grade. The section was originally meant as an experiment and it is not known if the section will continue to exist.

Stora Sam is currently undergoing extensive refurbishment; the school building itself is owned by Gothenburg City and the city will not sell the whole school yard. If Samskolan was to buy part that was for sale the city would build a preschool on Samskolan's school yard. Due to this the school decided not to buy the main building but to extend in the building where the Gymnasium resides.

== Additional images ==
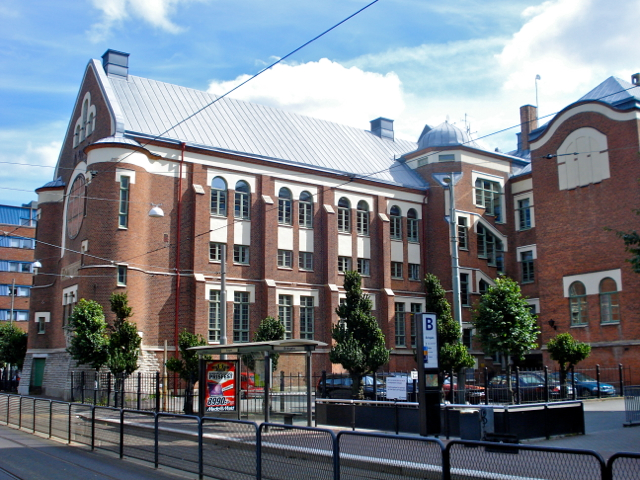
Samskolan seen from Svingeln.

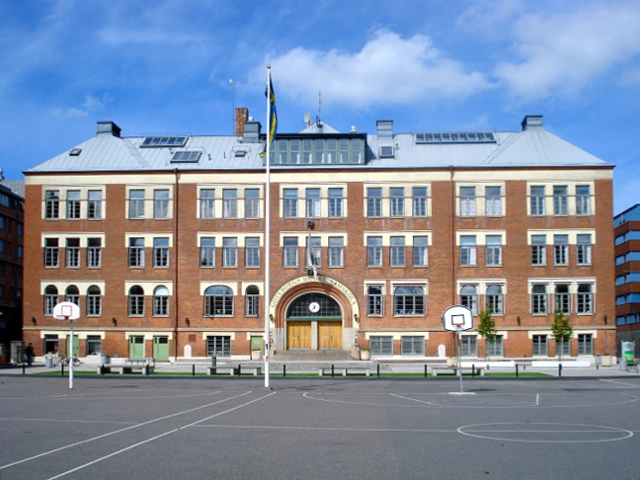
Göteborgs högre samskola in Göteborg
