= Escopetarra =

Guitar made from a modified firearm

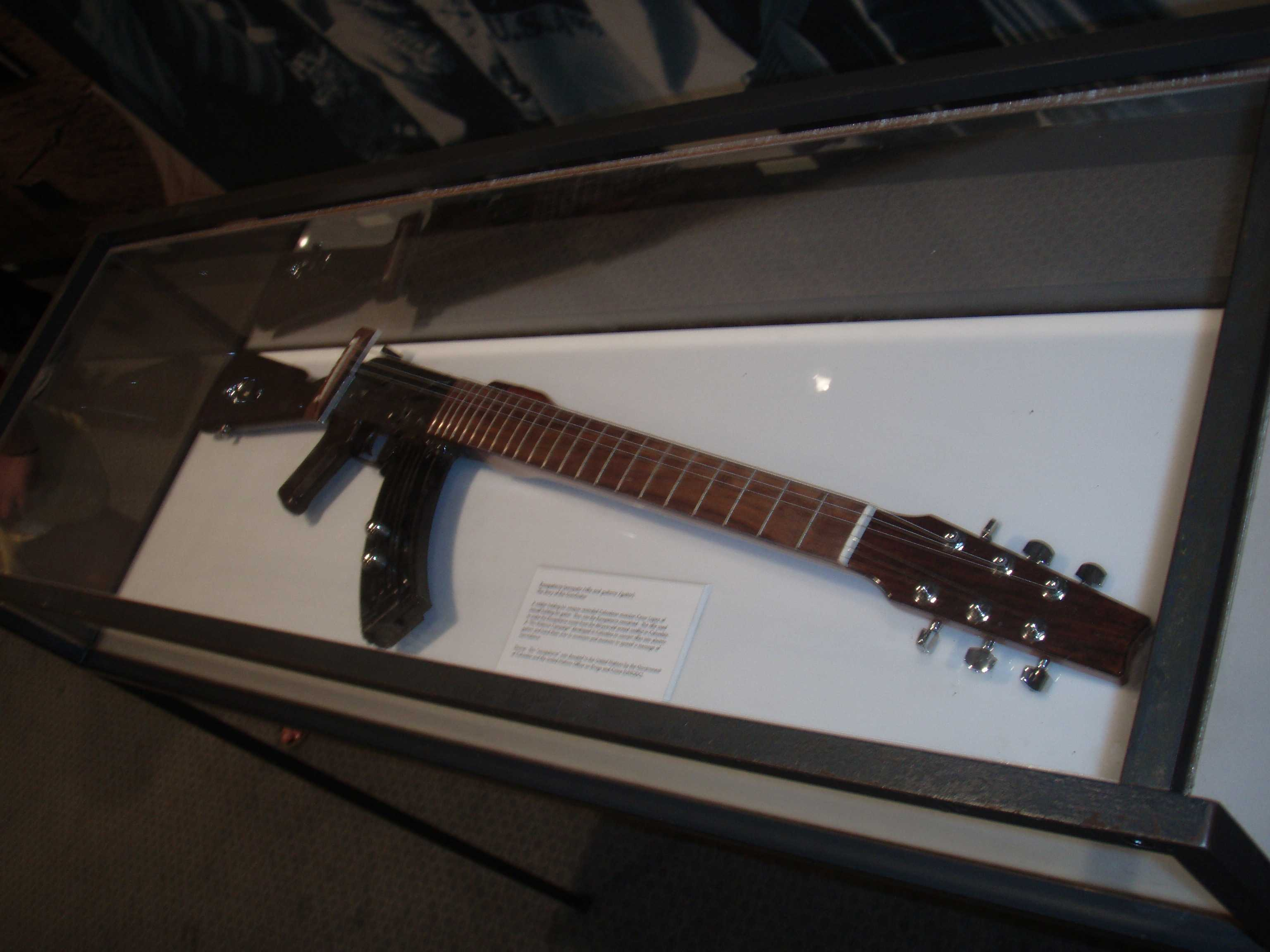
Escopetarra on display at the United Nations Headquarters.

Escopetarra display at the UN Headquarters as of December 2016

An escopetarra (Spanish: [eskopeˈtara]) is a guitar made from a modified firearm, used as a peace symbol. The name is a portmanteau of the Spanish words escopeta (shotgun) and guitarra (guitar).

== History ==
The escopetarra was invented by Colombian peace activist César López in 2003 at a gathering after the El Nogal Club bombing in Bogotá, when he noticed a soldier holding a firearm like a guitar. The first escopetarra in 2003 was made from a Winchester rifle and a Stratocaster electric guitar.

López initially had five escopetarras built by Colombian luthier Alberto Paredes, four of which were given to Colombian musician Juanes, Argentine musician Fito Páez, the United Nations Development Program, and the city government of Bogotá, while one was kept for himself. Juanes later sold his escopetarra for US$17,000 at a Beverly Hills fundraiser held to benefit victims of anti-personnel mines, while the escopetarra given to the UN was exhibited at the June 2006 of the UN Conference on Disarmament.

In 2006, López acquired an additional 12 decommissioned AK-47 assault rifles from Colombia's peace commissioner's office, with plans to convert them into guitars and give them to high-profile musicians such as Shakira, Carlos Santana, Juanes and Paul McCartney, as well as political figures such as the Dalai Lama. However, a member of the Dalai Lama's staff rejected López's offer, citing the inappropriateness of giving a weapon as a gift; López has said he will try to explain his purpose more clearly. One was also given to Kenyan singer Eric Wainaina on the occasion of the UNODC's 2008 International Day against Drug Abuse and Illicit Trafficking, to honour his appointment as a UNODC Messenger of Non-Violence.

During the 1980s, Pete Tosh of Jamaican reggae group The Wailers played a guitar that was shaped to look like an M16 assault rifle. Finnish death metal guitarist Sami Lopakka plays a similar instrument, known as the Lopashnikov.

== See also ==
- Swords into ploughshares
