= Museum of Sketches for Public Art =

Art museum in Lund, Sweden

Coordinates: 55°42′28″N 13°11′54″E

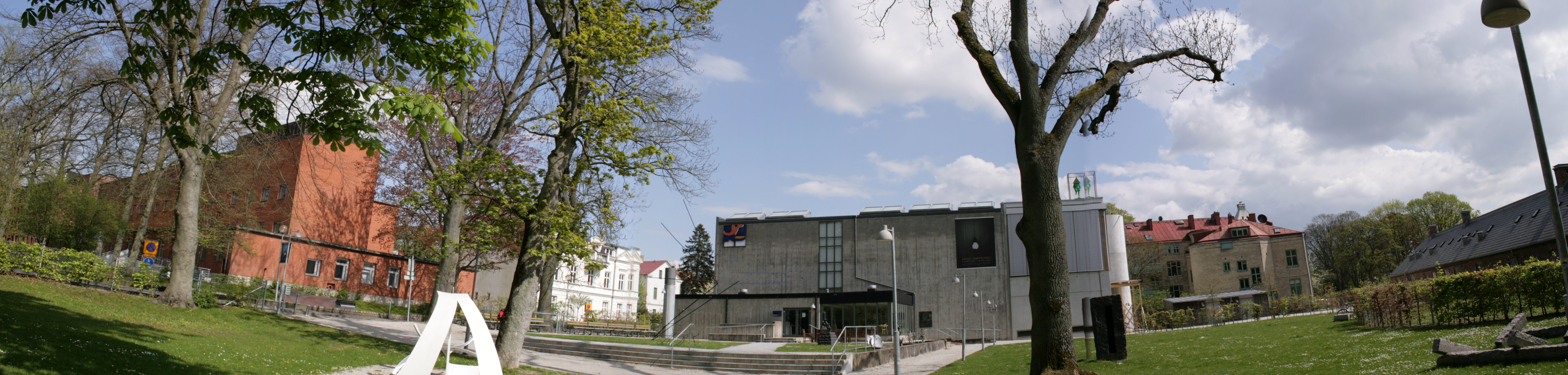
Museum of Sketches for Public Art, photographed in May 2008

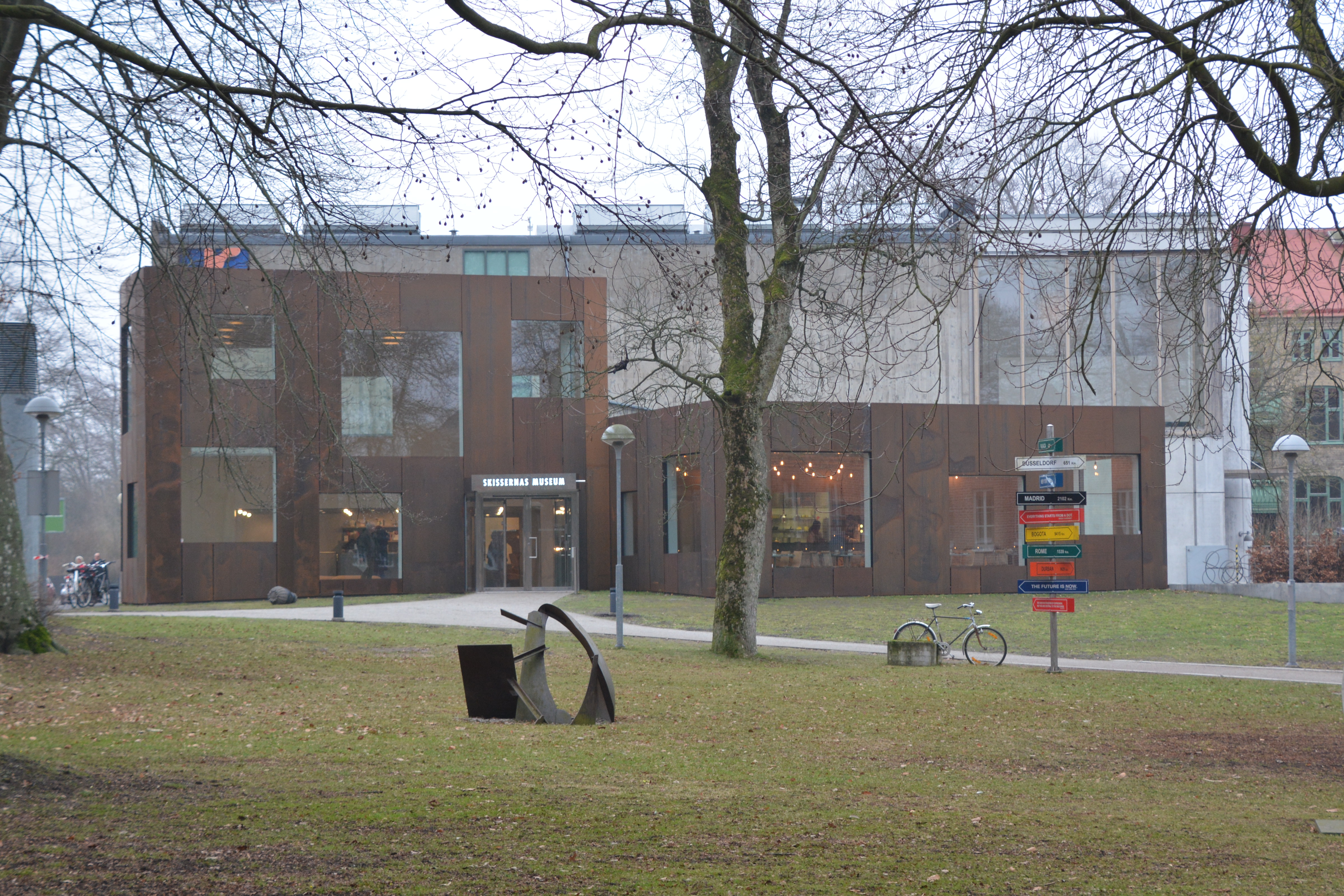
The exterior after the extension in 2017.

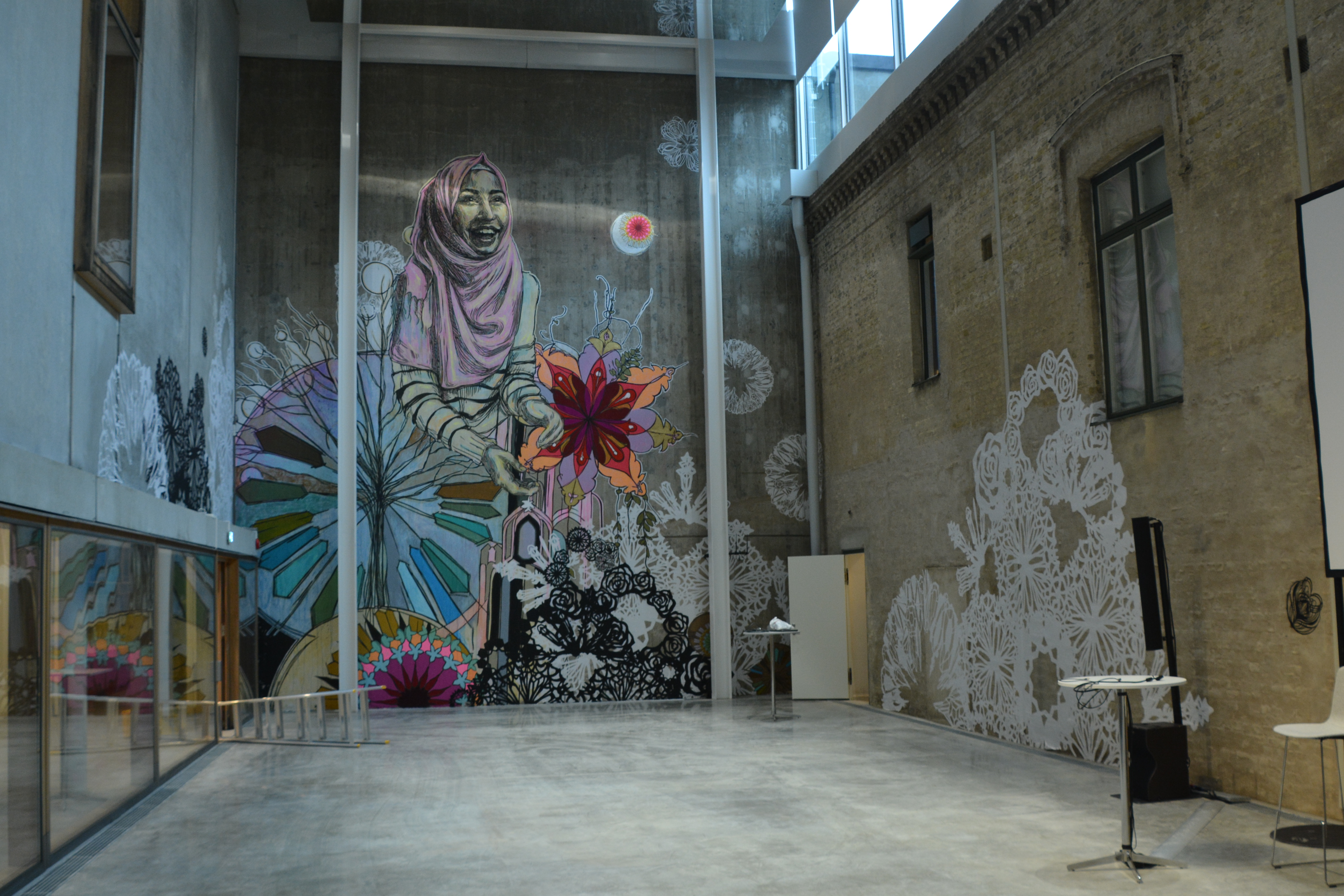
Museum of Sketches for Public Art.

The Museum of Sketches for Public Art (Swedish Skissernas museum - Arkiv för dekorativ konst, also known in English as the Archive of Decorative Art) is an art museum at Lund University in Sweden, dedicated to the collection and display of sketches and drawings for contemporary monumental and public art, such as frescos, sculpture and reliefs. The museums collection contains over 30,000 works, including sketches and contest entries by leading 20th-century Swedish artists such as Isaac Grünewald, other Nordic artists and foreign artists such as Henry Moore, Diego Rivera and Henri Matisse.

The museum was founded in 1934 by Ragnar Josephson (1891–1966), professor of the History and Theory of Art at Lund University. Josephson, who wanted to collect material illuminating the creative process of the artist, wrote a book on the topic, Konstverkets födelse ("The Birth of the Work of Art", 1940), as well as many shorter studies. The collection opened to the public in 1941 in a building close to the Lund University Library.

The original building was an old gymnastic hall; the architect Hans Westman added a new section, and another addition, designed by Johan Celsing, was completed in 2005. The museum reopened in March 2005 after having been closed for construction work since 2001.

== Gallery of the interior ==
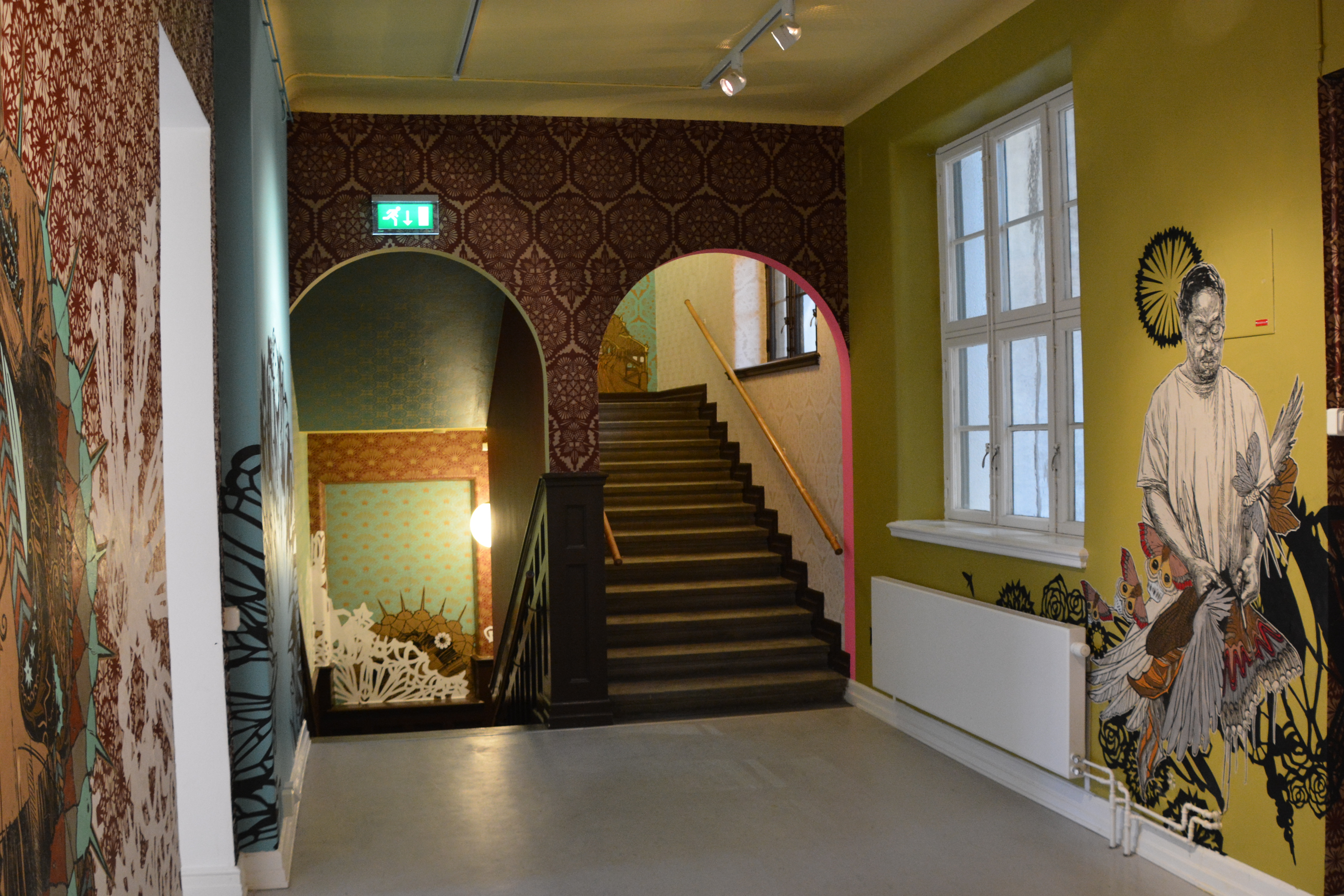

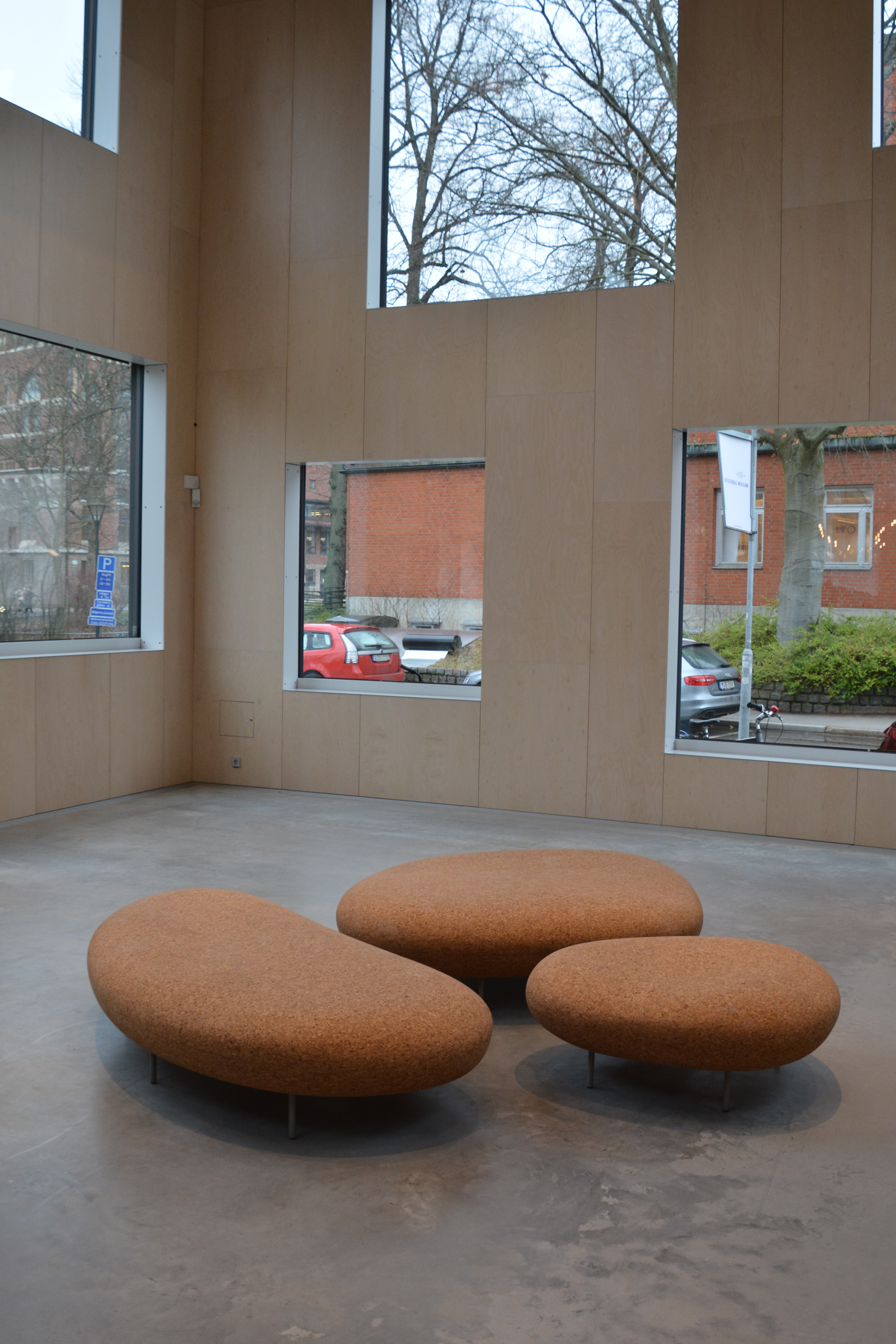

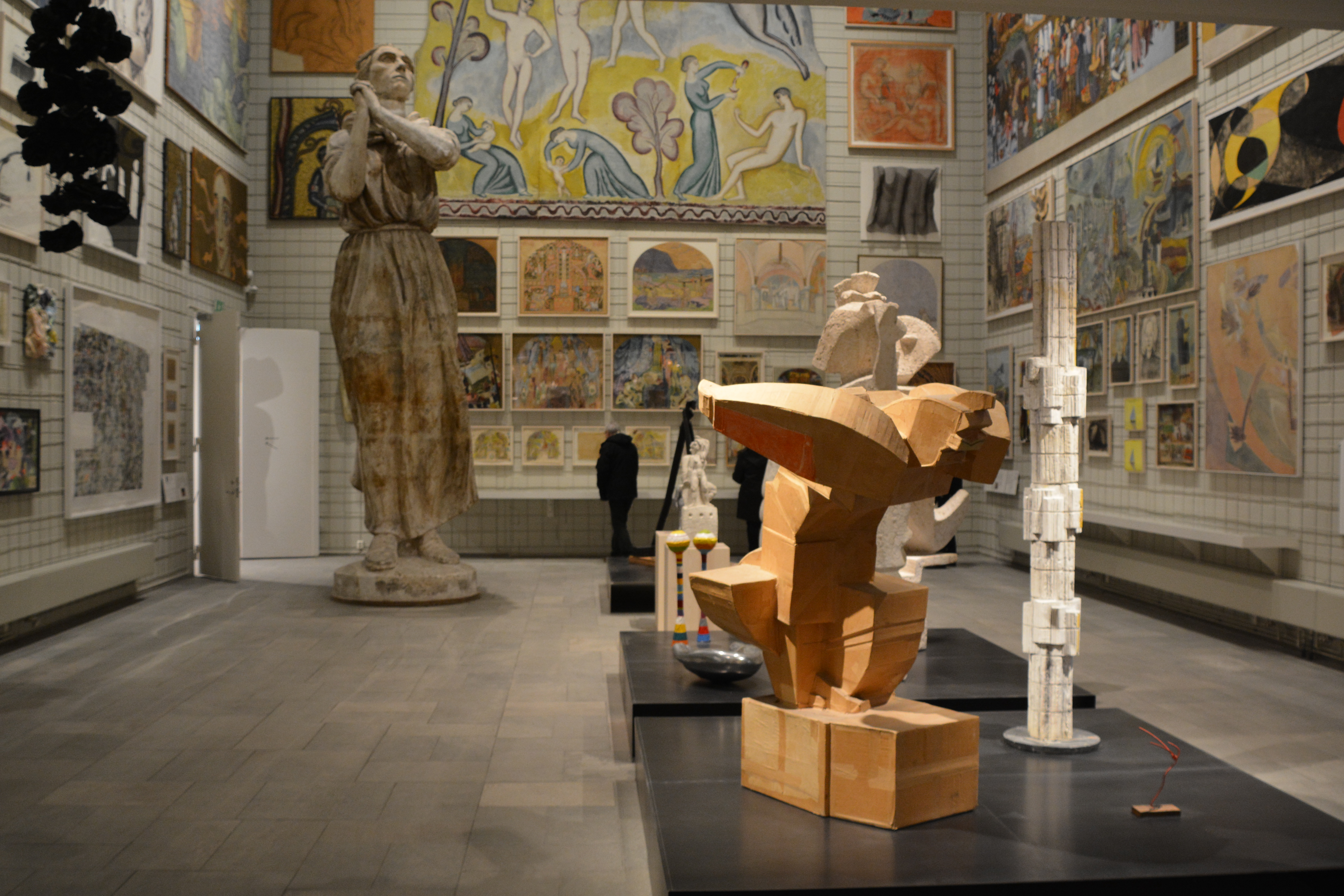

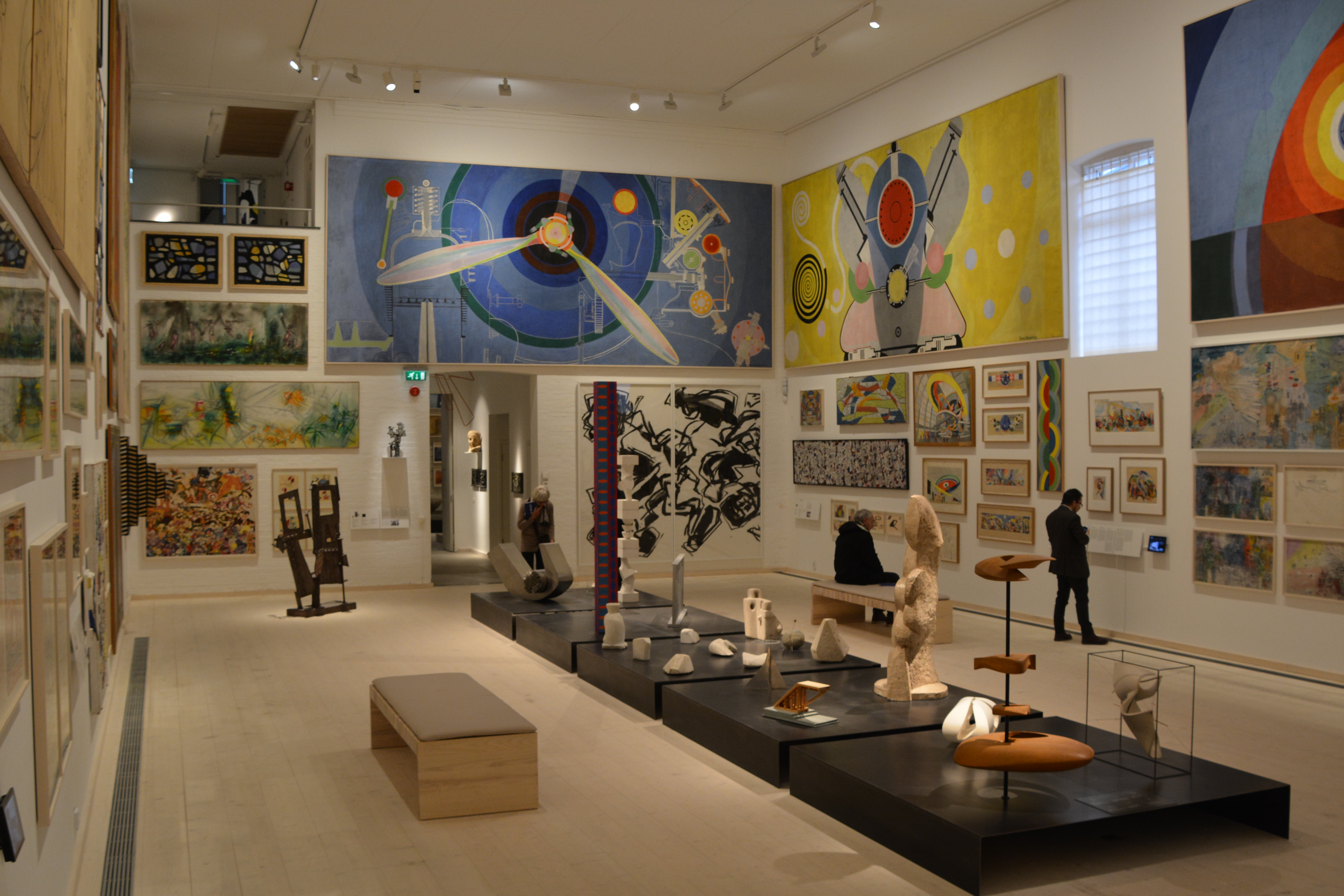

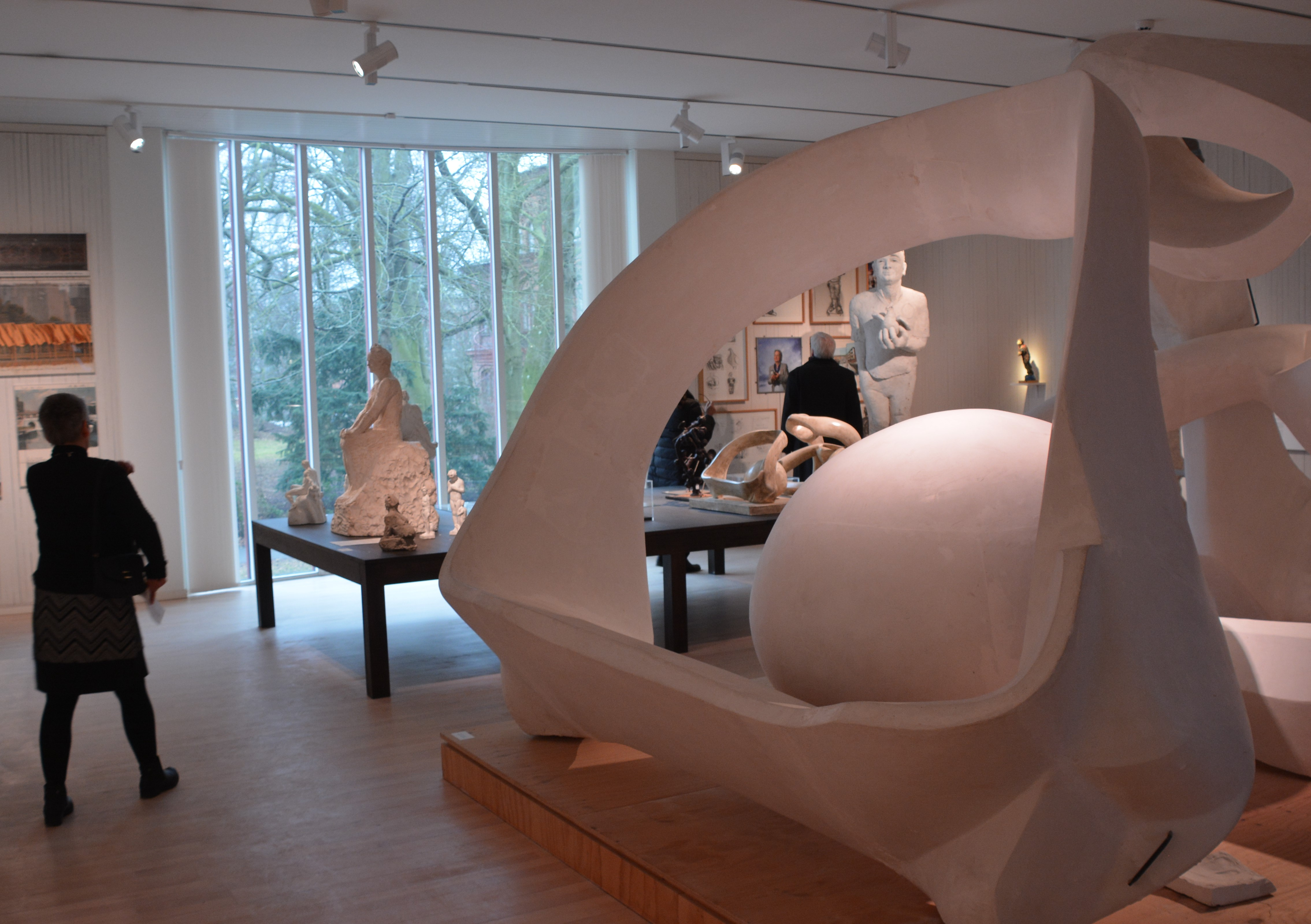

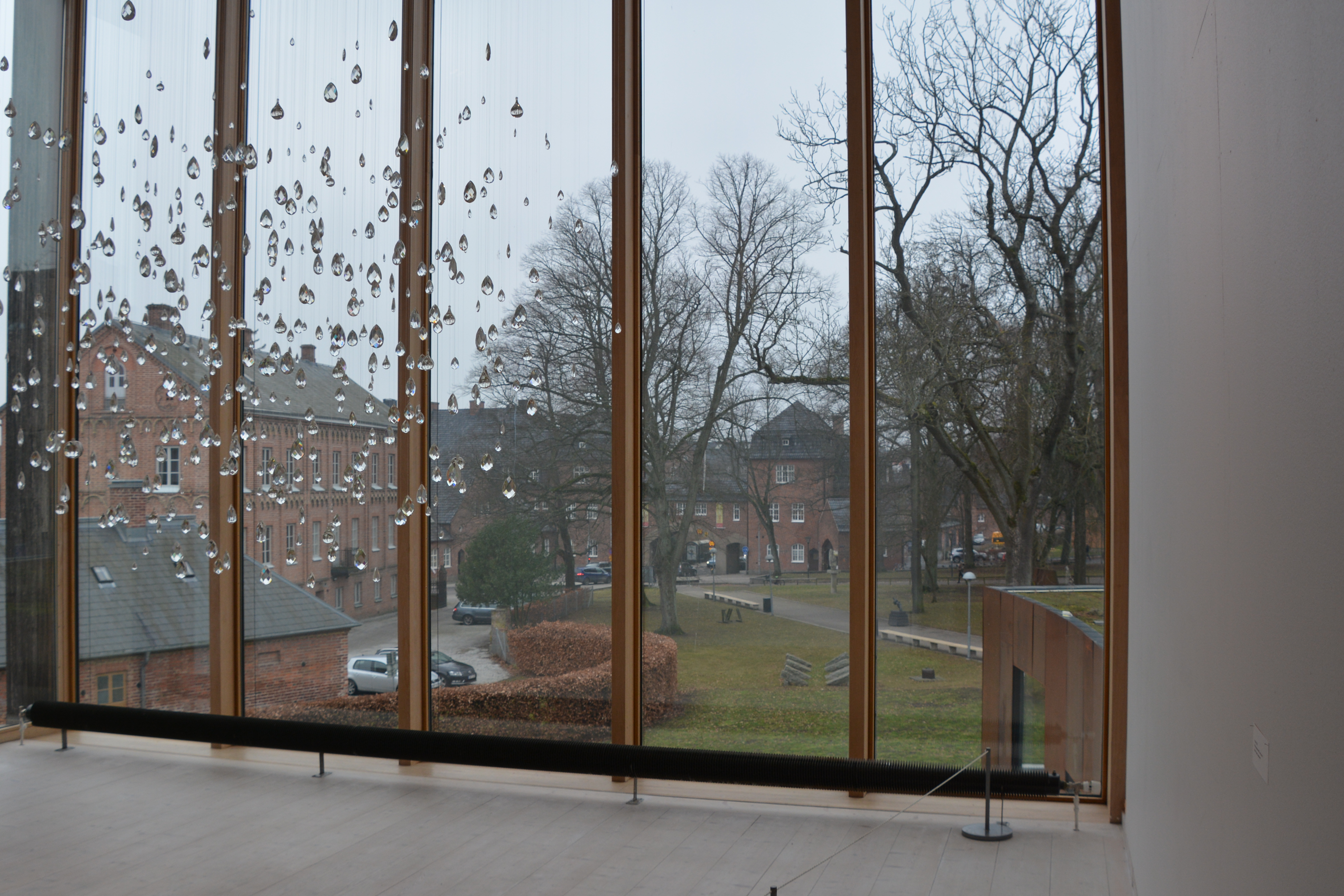
