= Carl Fredrik Reuterswärd =

Swedish painter and sculptor

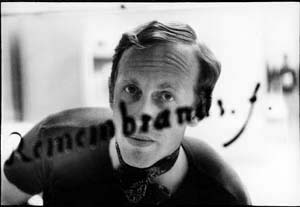
- Reuterswärd, photographed by Erling Mandelmann in 1964
- Born: 4 June 1934
- Died: 3 May 2016 (aged 81)
- Notable work: Non-violence
- Awards: Prince Eugen Medal

Carl Fredrik Reuterswärd (4 June 1934 – 3 May 2016) was a Swedish painter and sculptor.

He studied with Fernand Léger in Paris 1951 and was a professor of painting at The Academy of Fine Arts in Stockholm 1965–1969. In 1974 he was a guest professor at Minneapolis School of Art, Minneapolis, Minnesota. In 1986 he was awarded the Prince Eugen Medal for painting.

Reuterswärd died of pneumonia at a hospital in Landskrona, Sweden on 3 May 2016, aged 81.

== Gallery ==
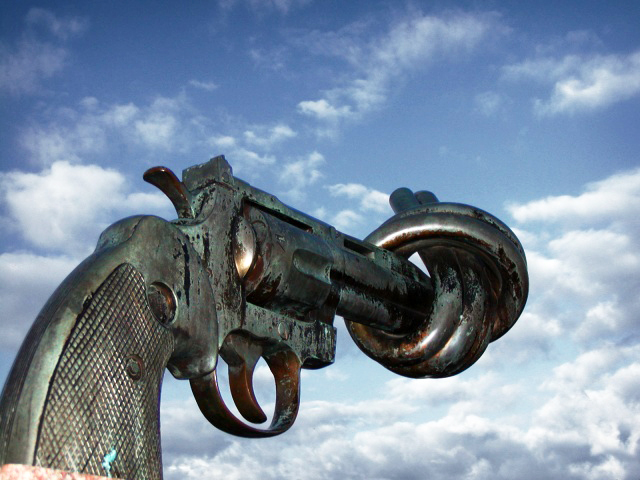
Non-violence in Malmö, Sweden

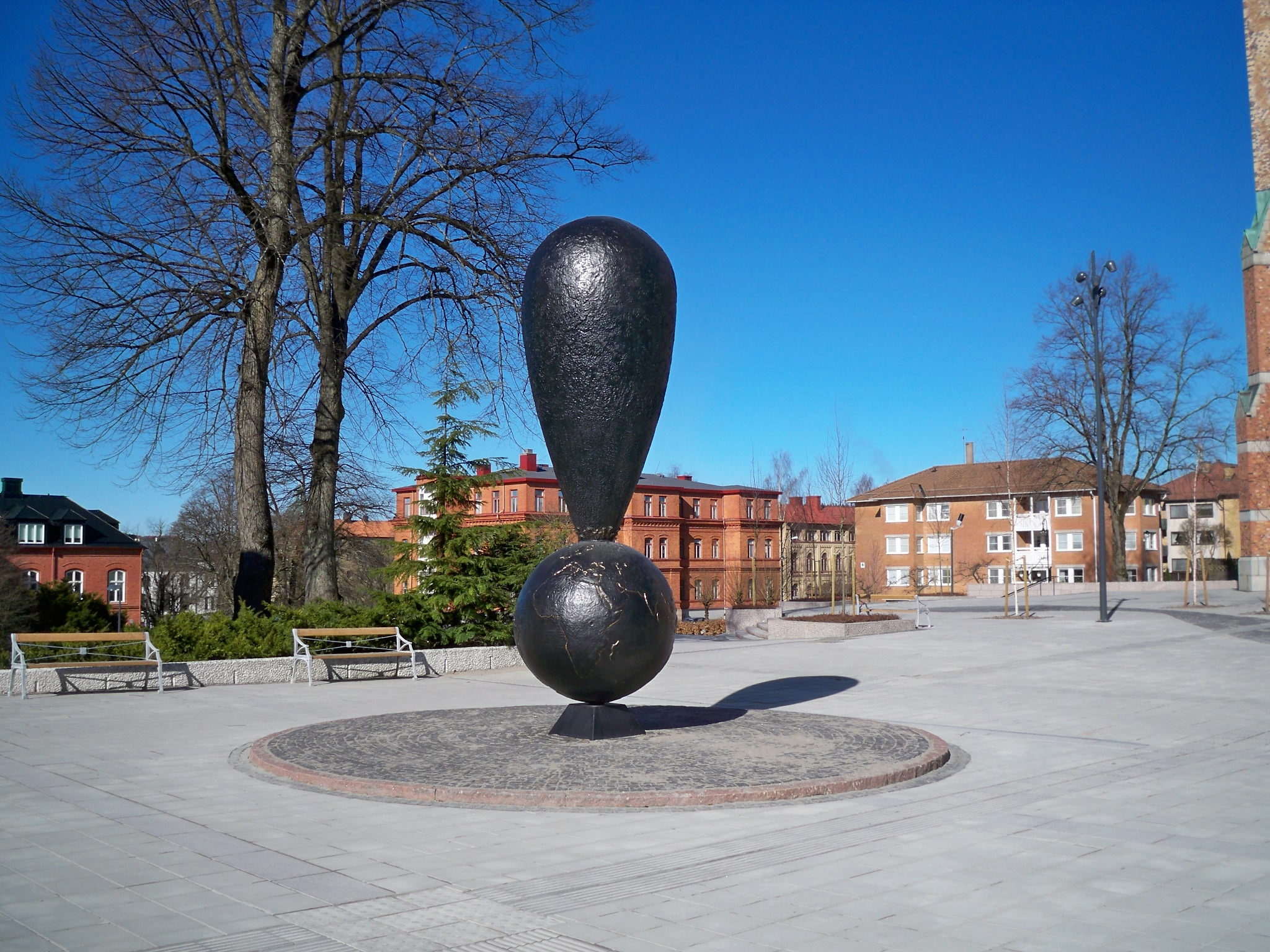
The bronze sculpture Var rädd om jorden (Take Care of the Earth), inaugurated on 25 November 2011 in Borås, Sweden

== An autobiographic trilogy ==
- 1988: Titta, jag är osynlig!, Gedins, reissued by Natur & Kultur, 2000 ISBN 91-7964-033-8
- 1996: Alias Charlie Lavendel 1952-61, Natur & Kultur ISBN 91-7964-226-8
- 2000: Closed for Holidays: memoarer, Natur & Kultur ISBN 91-27-08057-9
