= César López (Colombian musician) =

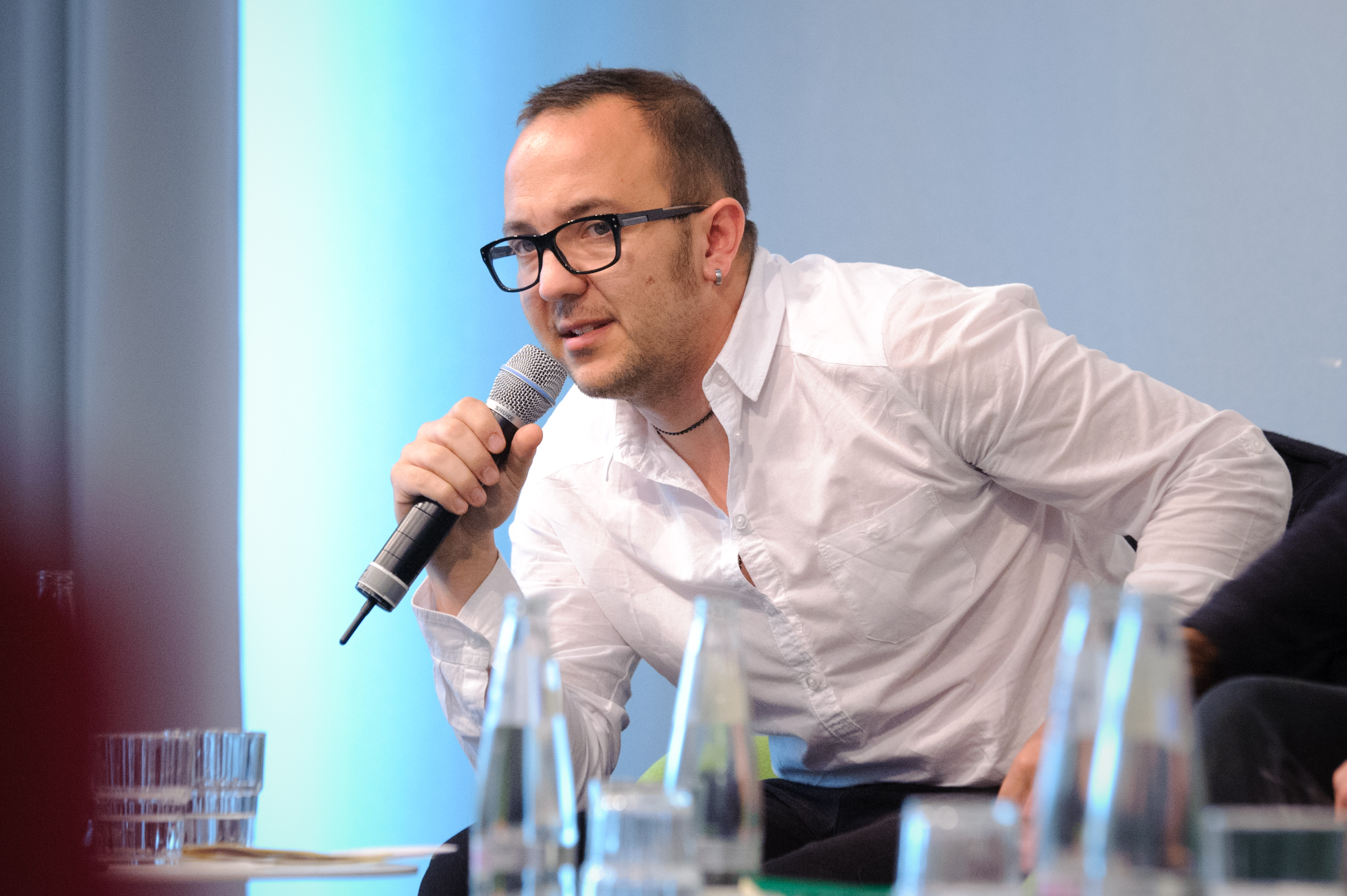
- López in 2012

Background information
- Origin: Bogotá, Colombia
- Occupations: Musician, peace activist
- Instruments: Voice, guitar, drums, piano
- Website: www.cesarlopez.org

César López Giraldo (born 1973) is a classically trained musician, composer, producer guitarist and pianist.

== Life ==
In 2003, López founded the Battalion of Immediate Artistic Reaction which involves various musicians and activists seeking alternatives to the ever-present violence that has plagued Colombia over many years. The group mainly concentrates its efforts on the capital city of Bogotá. When advised, the group is widely known to immediately convene together to play for the victims directly impacted by the violence within the country.

Cesar Lopez is officially a 'Non Violence Messenger' of the United Nations and an 'Emissary of Consciousness' for Amnesty International.

López is the creator of the Escopetarra, a largely symbolic musical instrument which is an AK-47 converted into a guitar.

In 2010, he and his Audio Engineer, Julio Monroy, recorded the album "Las voces del Salado", the album was recorded at the "Montes de Maria" with the people from the town El Salado who were involved in the Masacre of El Salado.

== Escopetarra ==
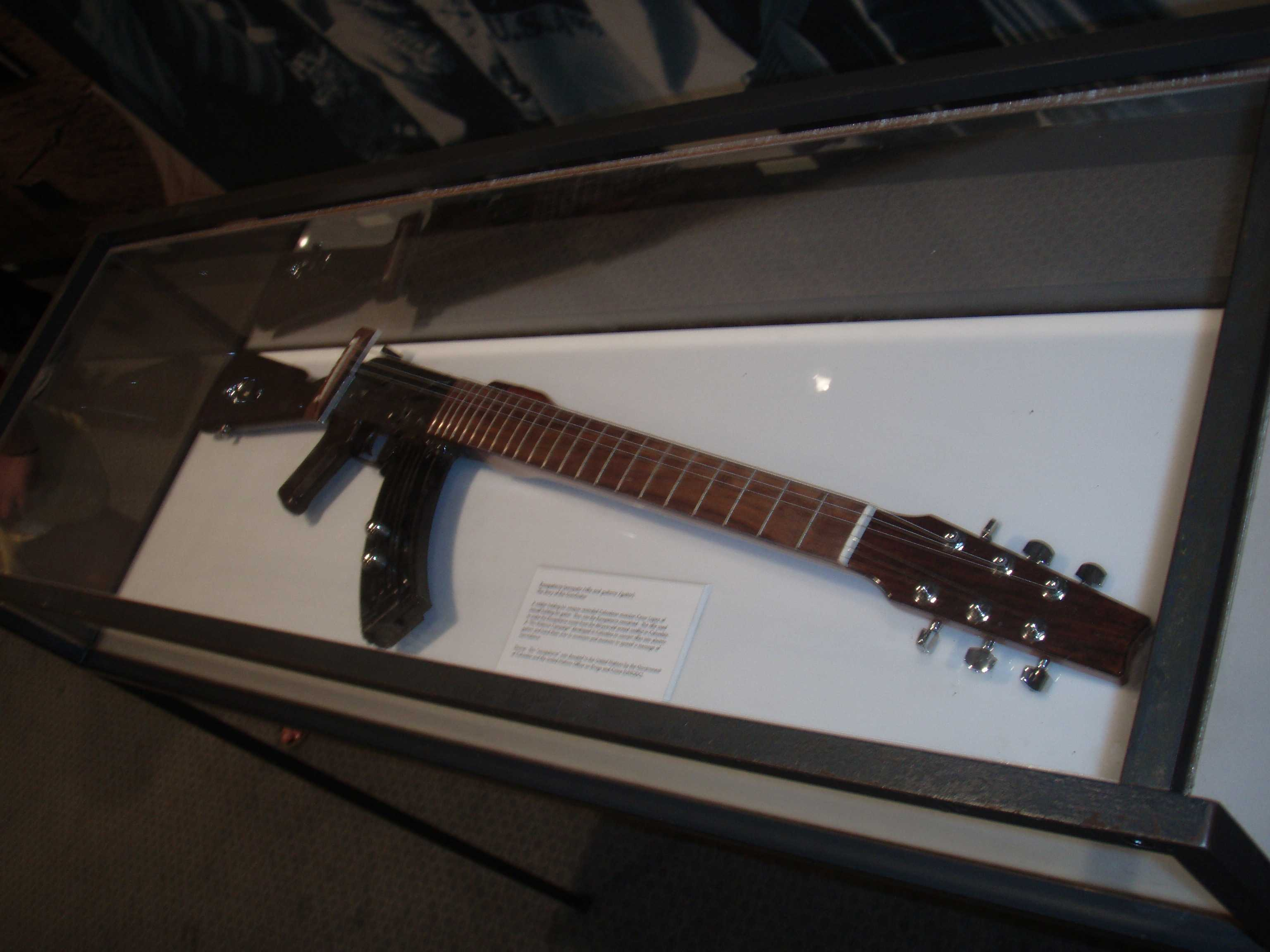
A López escopetarra on display at the United Nations Headquarters

López's most well-known achievement is the escopetarra, which are decommissioned AK-47s converted into guitars. So far, only a few dozen of these guitars have been produced, but upon completion, López intends to give the guitars to high-profile musicians across the world, such as Juanes, Fito Páez, Bob Geldof and Manu Chao, and to political and religious leaders such as Kofi Annan.
