= Konevets =

Island on Lake Ladoga, Russia

Coordinates: 60°51′40″N 30°36′50″E

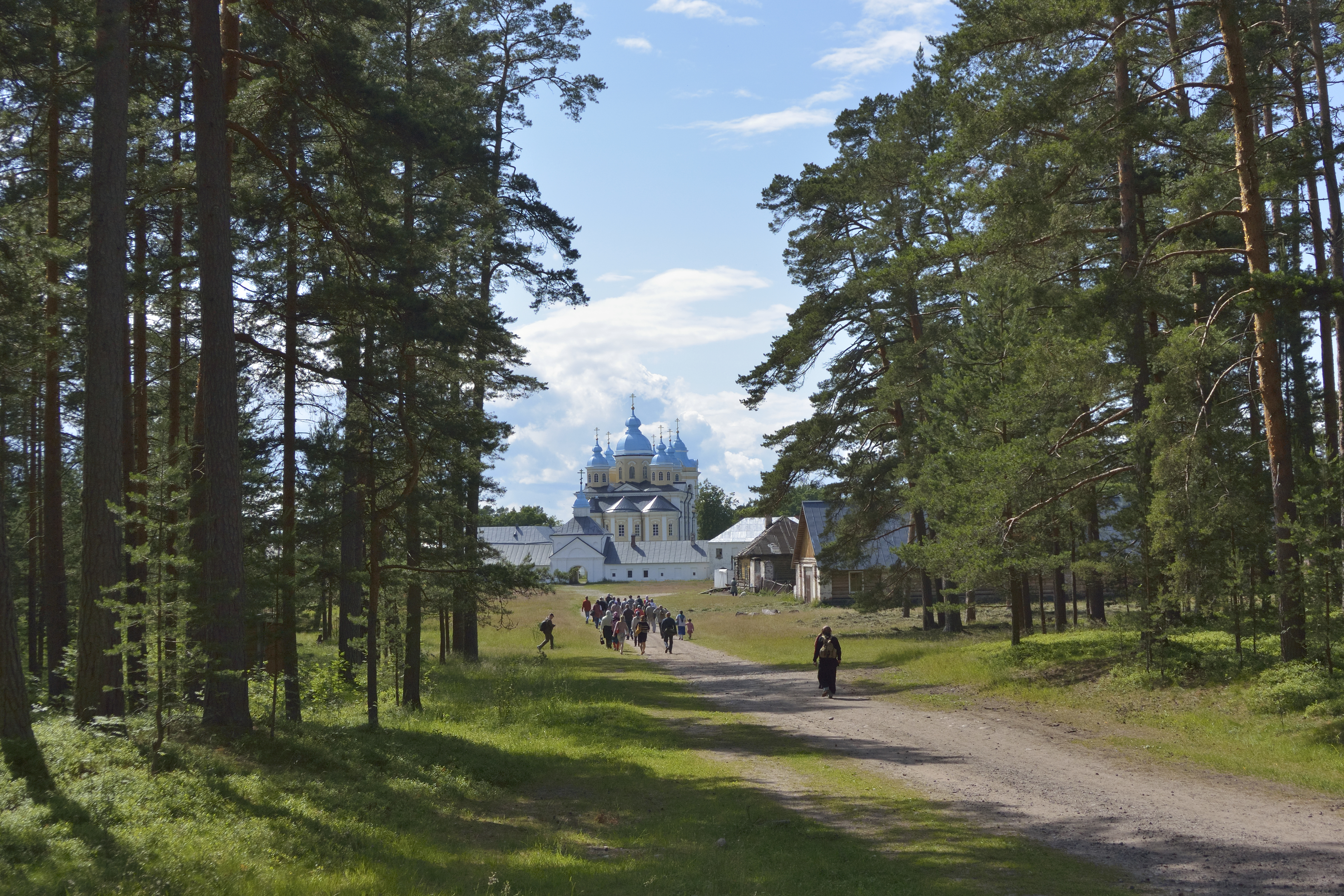
The pilgrims on Konevets Island

Konevets (Russian: Коневец; Finnish: Konevitsa or Kononsaari) is an approximately 8.5-km² island famous as the site of the Konevsky Monastery. It is located off the southwestern shore of Lake Ladoga near the village of Vladimirovka. The island is part of the Priozersky District of Leningrad Oblast. The nearest town is Priozersk, which is located 40 km away from the island. The island of Valaam is 60 km away and Saint Petersburg is 170 km away by boat. There is a ferry link from Vladimirovka that makes the 6.5-km trip in 40–50 minutes.

== Geography and environment ==
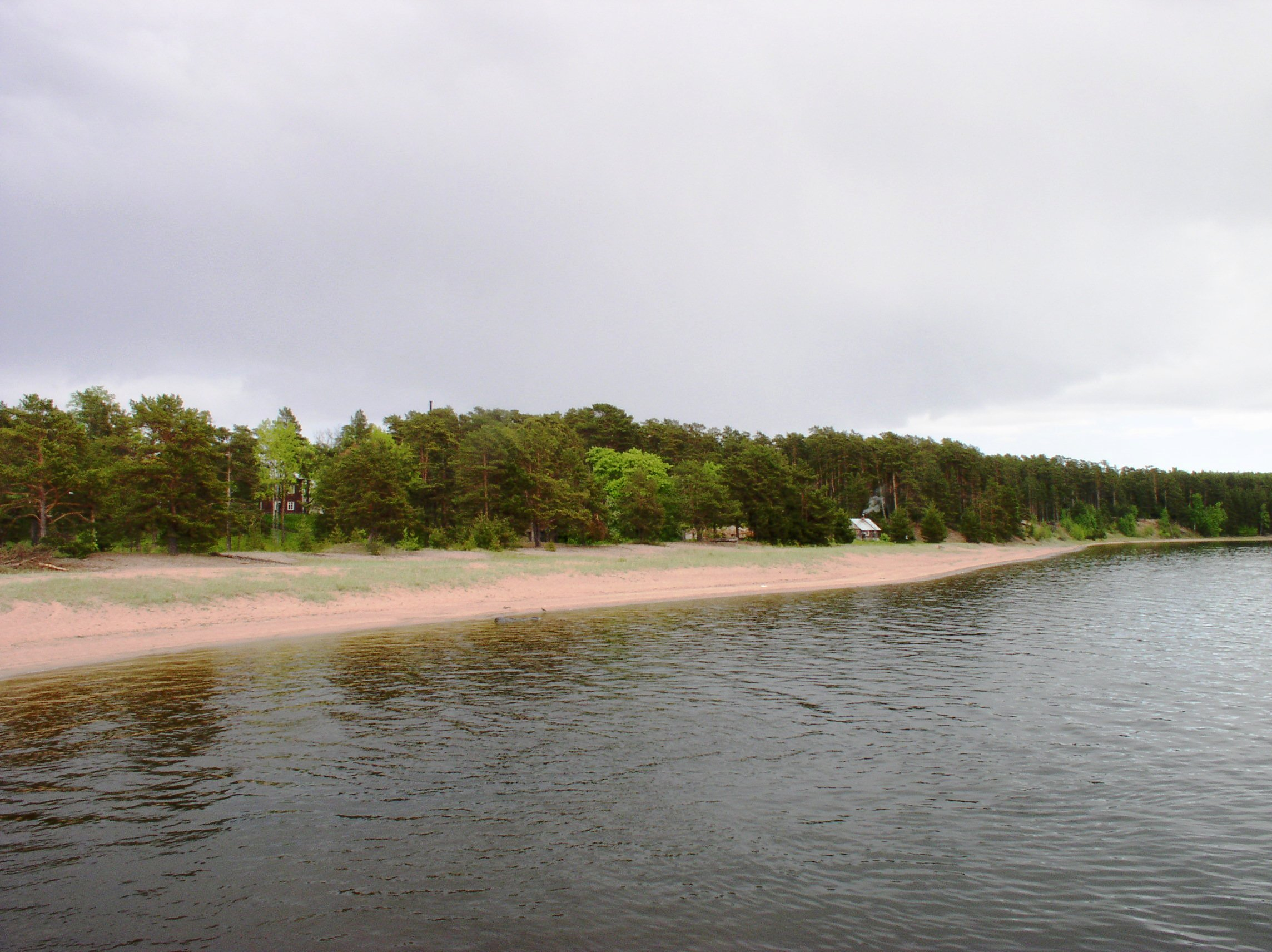
Sandy beach typical of Konevets

The island is 6.5 km long and generally slightly less than 2 km wide. At its widest point near the monastery on the south end of the island, where it is approximately 3 km wide. The island is completely covered in sandy soil. The majority of the shore is covered in fine sand beaches. Topographically, the island is mostly level. The terrain of sandy heath slopes gently up from the shoreline towards the interior of the island, where two cliffs, Svyataya and Zmeinaya, rise up out of the ground to 34 m and 29 m above sea level respectively. The steep cliffs are the result of erosion when the water level in Lake Ladoga was slightly less than 20 m above the current sea level, thus reaching the base of these cliffs, thousands of years before the Neva emerged. The majority of the island is uninhabited, and covered by coniferous trees. The average annual temperature is 3.5 °C. The island experiences a short summer season, from mid June to the latter half of August. July is the warmest month on the island. Winters can be quite harsh, and it is possible to walk to the island across the ice then.

== History ==
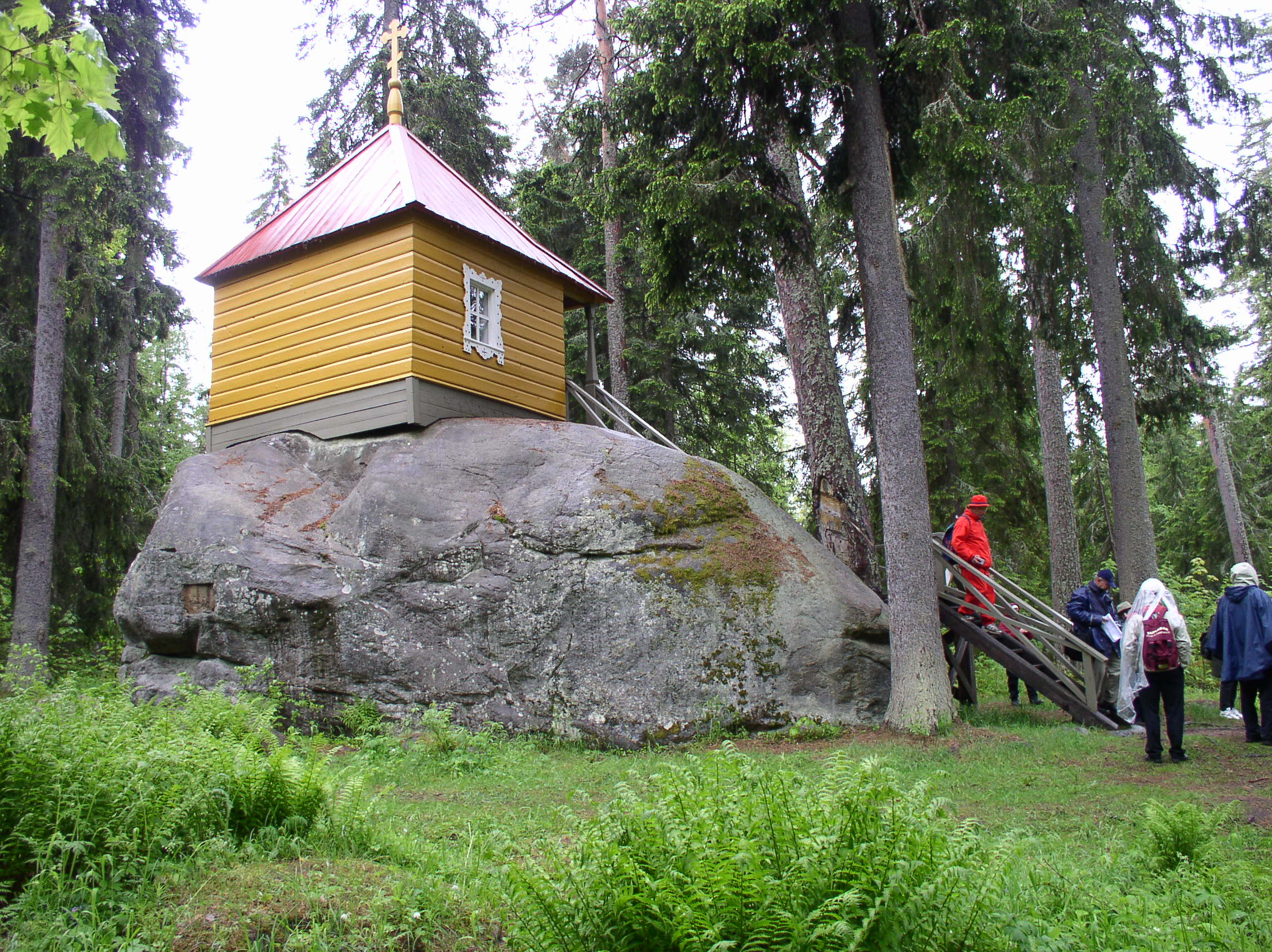
Horse Stone

There is no certain information about the island’s earliest stages. According to sources discussing the establishment of the monastery on the island, there was a rock named Kon-kamen or Horse Rock where the Karelians went to perform sacrifices. The rock is located approximately 1 km north-northeast of the monastery at the base of the west slope of Svyataya. The rock is a rounded granite slab that is 9 m long, 6 m wide, approximately 4 m high and 750 tonnes that resembles the head of a horse. An Orthodox chapel has been built on top of it. The Russian name for the island, and thus the current Finnish name, are derived from the name of the rock or perhaps the assumed original Karelian name Hevossaari (Horse Island).

The island’s Orthodox Monastery of the Nativity of the Blessed Virgin Mary was founded by Arseny of Novgorod in 1393. The Swedes captured the island and destroyed the monastery in 1577 and 1610. Sweden lost control of the island as a result of their being beaten by Peter I of Russia in the Great Northern War. The current buildings are mainly from the 19th century and the beginning of the 20th century. The island did not suffer any damage in the Russian revolution, as it had become part of Independent Finland in 1917.

In 1940, during the Second World War, the monks moved to the interior of Finland and joined the monks at the Orthodox Monastery of New Valamo. The island was ceded to the Soviet Union and the monastery fell into disrepair. From 1944 to 1990, the island was used by the military and thus closed to the public. In 1991, visitors were allowed back on the island and repairs and renovations to the monastery commenced. Approximately 20 monks now live on the island, which has become a popular place of pilgrimage.

== Trivia ==
- A traditional Karelian folk song about the island is entitled Konevitsan kirkonkellot (The Church Bells of Konevets). The Finnish group Piirpauke recorded a version of this song in 1975. Heavy metal band Sentenced used the melody as intro on their 2002 album The Cold White Light.

== See also ==
- Konevsky Monastery
- Valaam Monastery
- Alexander-Svirsky Monastery
