= Konevsky Monastery =

Monastery on Konevets Island, Russia

Coordinates: 60°50′52″N 030°35′08″E

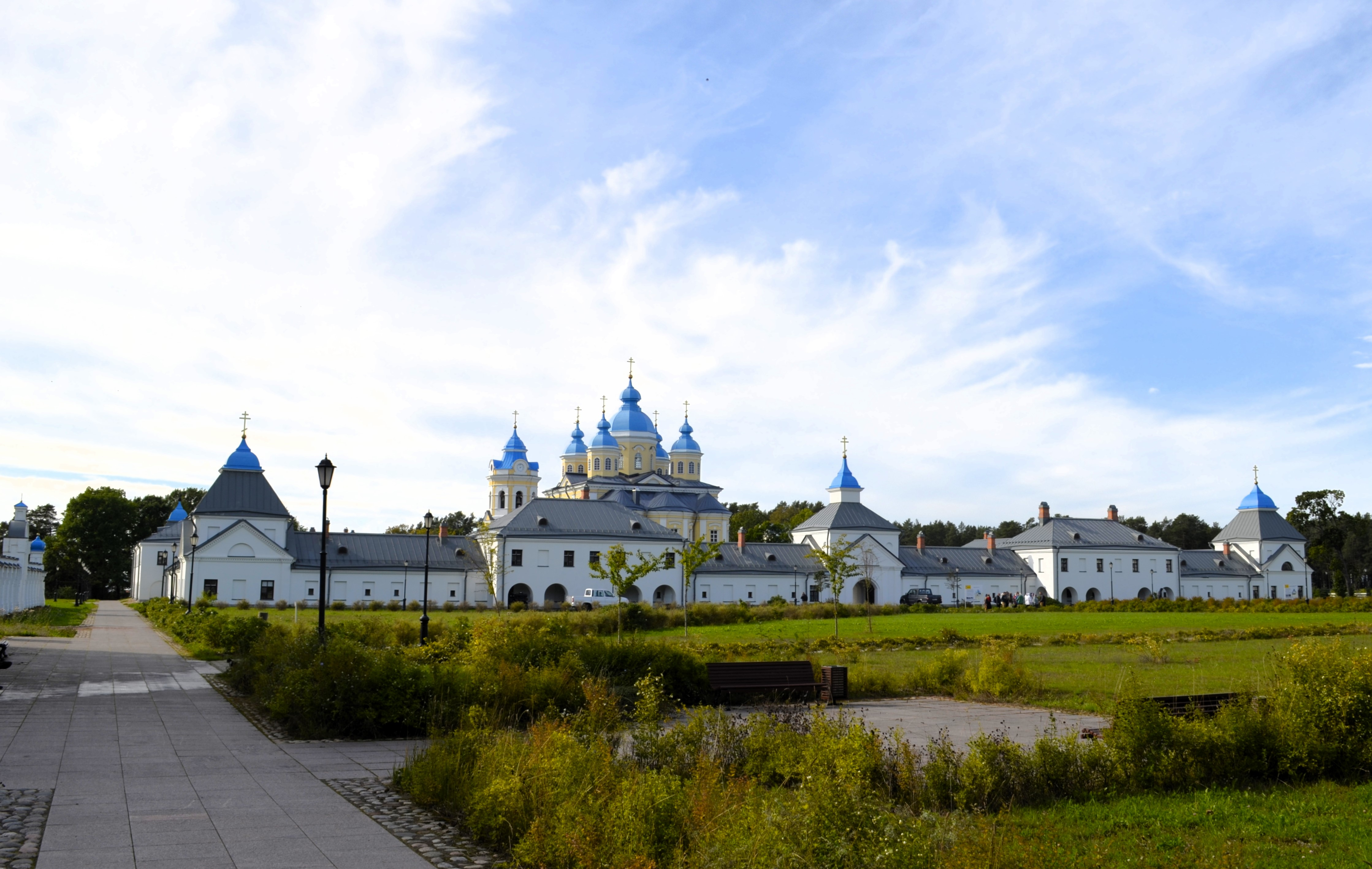
View from the east

Konevsky Monastery (Russian: Рождество-Богородичный Коневский монастырь, Finnish: Konevitsan Jumalansynnyttäjän syntymän luostari) is a Russian Orthodox monastery that occupies the Konevets Island in the western part of the Lake Ladoga, Leningrad Oblast, Russian Federation. It is often regarded as the twin monastery with the Valaam Monastery, also located on an island group in the same lake.

== Medieval origins ==
The island of Konevets (Finnish: Konevitsa or Kononsaari) has the maximum length of 5 km; its average width is 2 km. The island is separated from the mainland by a 5-km-wide strait. In the Middle Ages, the island was considered holy by the Finnish tribes who particularly revered a huge boulder in the shape of a horse's skull, weighing more than 750 tons. This boulder is known as Kon’-Kamen’ or Hevoskivi (literally, "Steed-Stone") and gives its name to the island.

The monastery was founded around 1393 by St. Arseny Konevsky, who wished to convert pagan Karelians to Christianity. The location of the monastery was changed several times, in order to avert floods. The Church of the Nativity of the Theotokos was founded by St. Arseny in 1428; it was at this church that the monastery's main shrine was placed. It was a miraculous image of Mother of God, brought by St. Arseny from Mount Athos and representing Christ playing with a dove nestling, symbolizing spiritual purity.

Like the Valaam Monastery, the abbey at Konevets was known for its missionary activities. The Swedes captured the island during the Ingrian War, forcing the monks to retreat to Novgorod. Only after Russia retook the territory in the course of the Great Northern War they were allowed to reclaim their ancient possessions in Konevets. The revived cloister depended upon Novgorod until 1760, when it was officially recognized as a separate monastic establishment.

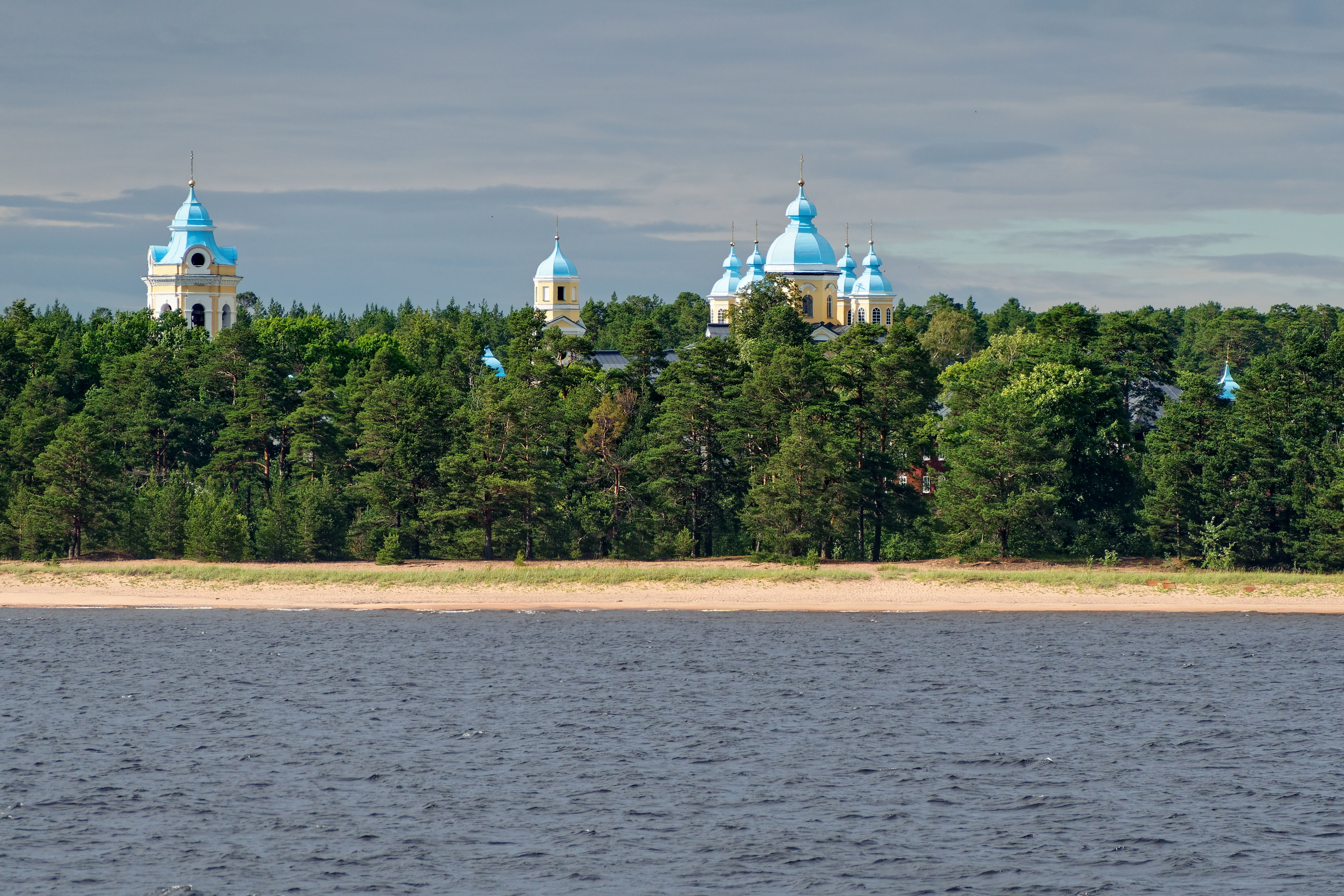
The domes as seen from the lake

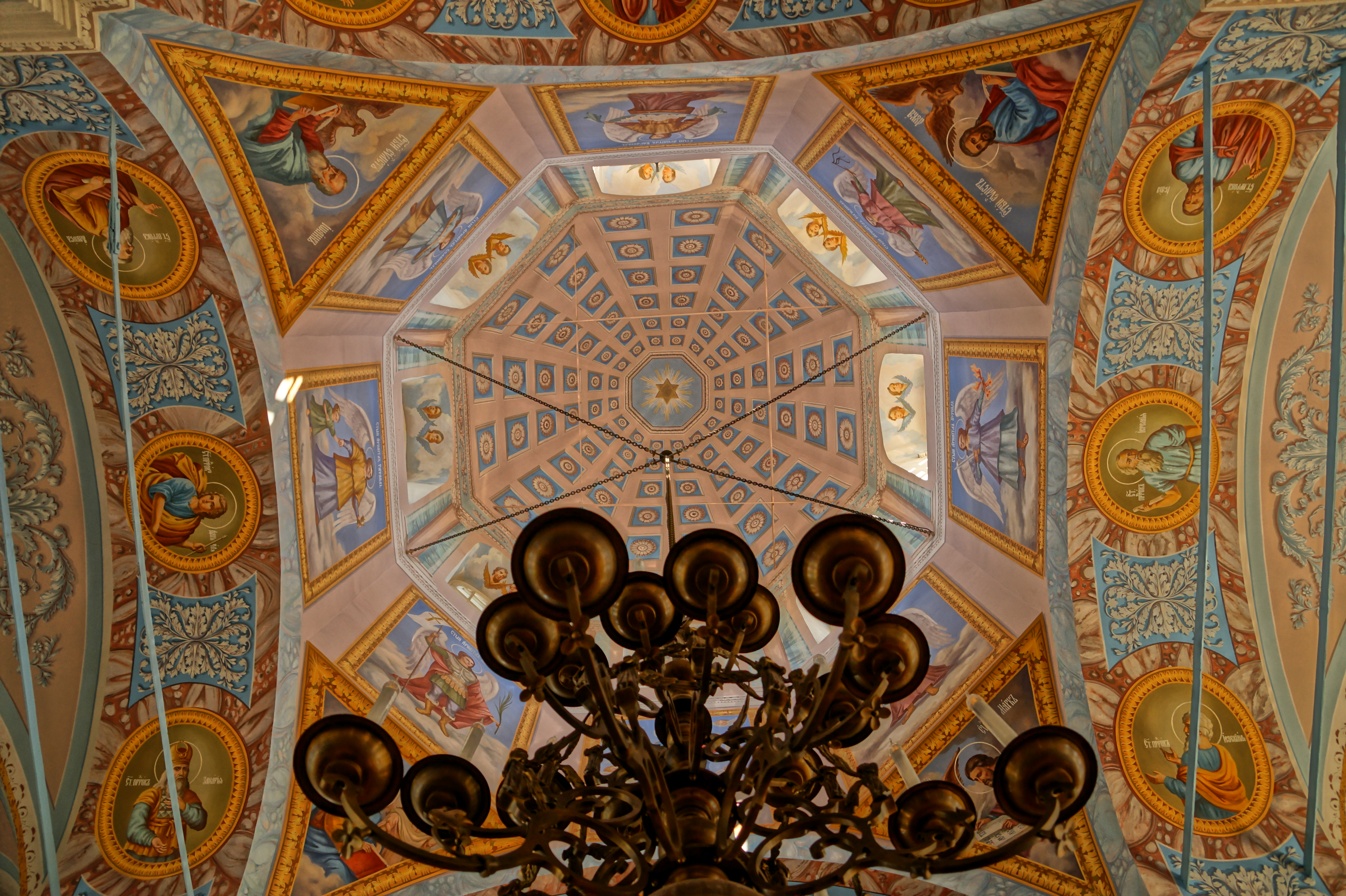
The painted ceiling of the main dome

In 1812, after the Finnish War the monastery administratively became part of the newly formed Grand Duchy of Finland, along with the rest of "Old Finland".

== 19th century ==
The golden age of the monastery came with the 19th century, when its fame spread to the imperial capital and the island was visited by eminent visitors from Saint Petersburg, including Alexandre Dumas and Fyodor Tyutchev. An 1873 essay by Nikolai Leskov describes his impressions from the monastery.

As a consequence of its high profile, the monastic community could fund extensive building projects, starting with the construction of a new cathedral in 1800–09. This huge two-storey eight-pillared building was designed by a local starets. It is surmounted by five octagonal drums bearing five blue bud-shaped domes. The same style is applied to the three-storey belltower (1810–12), rising to the height of 35 meters. Several other churches, a quay and an inn were added in the course of the century. Two sketae were set up to mark the ancient locations of the monastery.

== 20th century ==
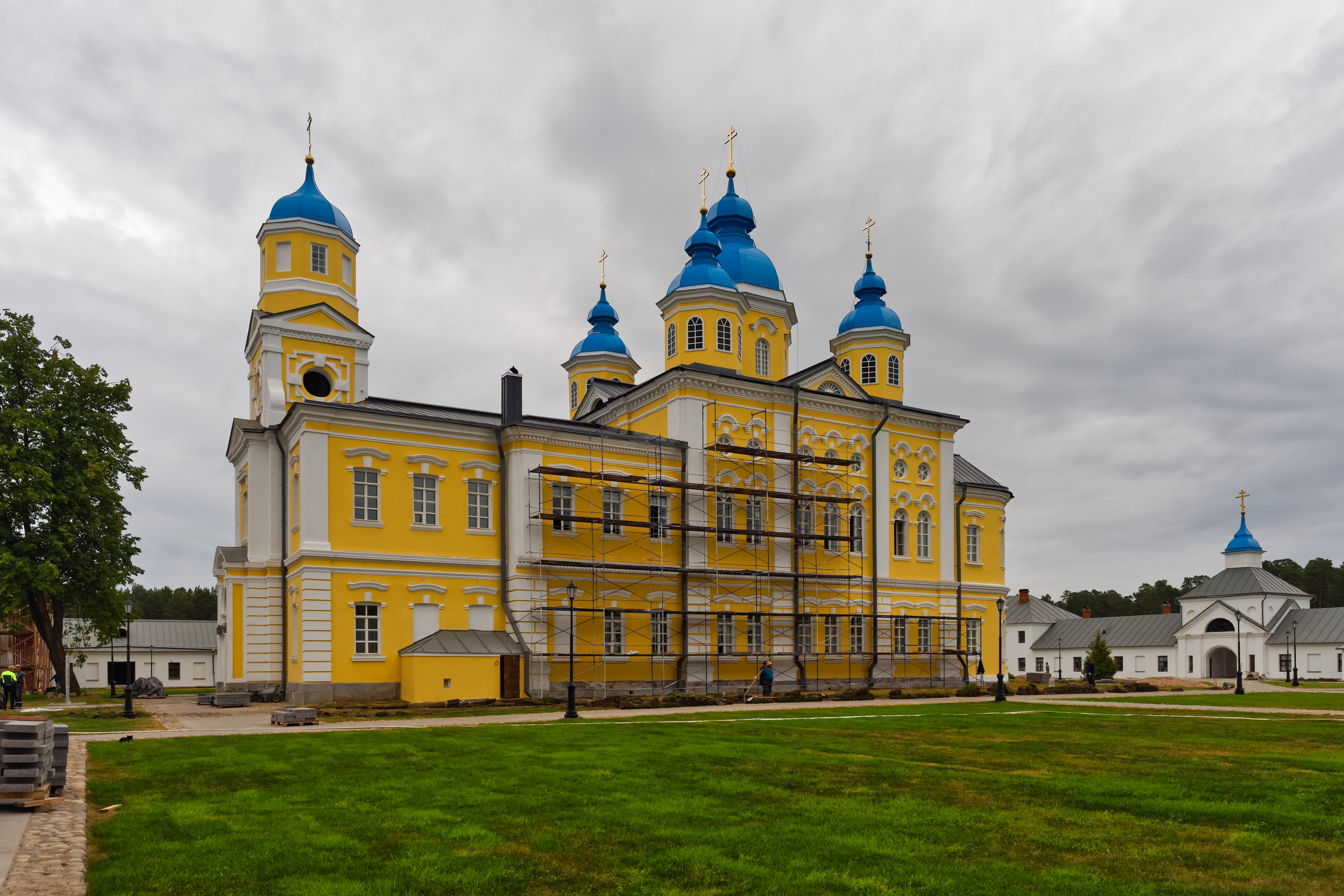
The main church, built between 1800 and 1809, is dedicated to the Nativity of the Theotokos

After the Russian Revolution of 1917, the monastery passed to the newly independent Finland, and came under the jurisdiction of the autonomous Finnish Orthodox Church under the Ecumenical Patriarchate of Constantinople. The island was fortified by the Finnish military, and the inn was expropriated to house a regiment staff. During the Winter War and Continuation War the monastery buildings were damaged. On 13 March 1940 the Winter War ended. The previous day the monks had been evacuated to the interior of Finland, taking the holy icon with them, but leaving the iconostasis, church bells, and the library. Another personal possession of St. Arseny, the Konevsky Psalter, dated to the 14th century, was sent to the Russian National Library. In 1940, the monks bought an estate named Hiekka (‘Sands’) from the Saastamoinen company in Keitele, and the monastery continued to function there until 1956.

The monks returned for a brief period during the Continuation War, but withdrew on 19 June 1944, ten days after the Soviet Union began the Offensive on the Karelian Isthmus, even though the Soviet troops never conquered the island or the adjacent shoreline on the isthmus. (These areas were ceded to the Soviet Union after the 1944 Moscow Armistice of September 19, 1944.)

In 1956, the monks joined the New Valamo Monastery in Heinävesi.

During the Soviet period, the monastery housed a military unit. In 1990, it became one of the first monasteries in the region to be revived by the Russian Orthodox Church. In November 1991, the brethren announced the discovery of St. Arseny's relics, that apparently had been hidden from the Swedes in 1573. By 2004, the Konevsky Monastery, which hosts a large number of tourists and pilgrims, had been mostly restored.

== Literature ==
- Bertash, Alexander V.; Arseni, Hieromonk (1993). Konevitsan luostari. Otava. ISBN 951-1-12702-0.
