= Lake Ladoga =

Lake in Leningrad, Russia

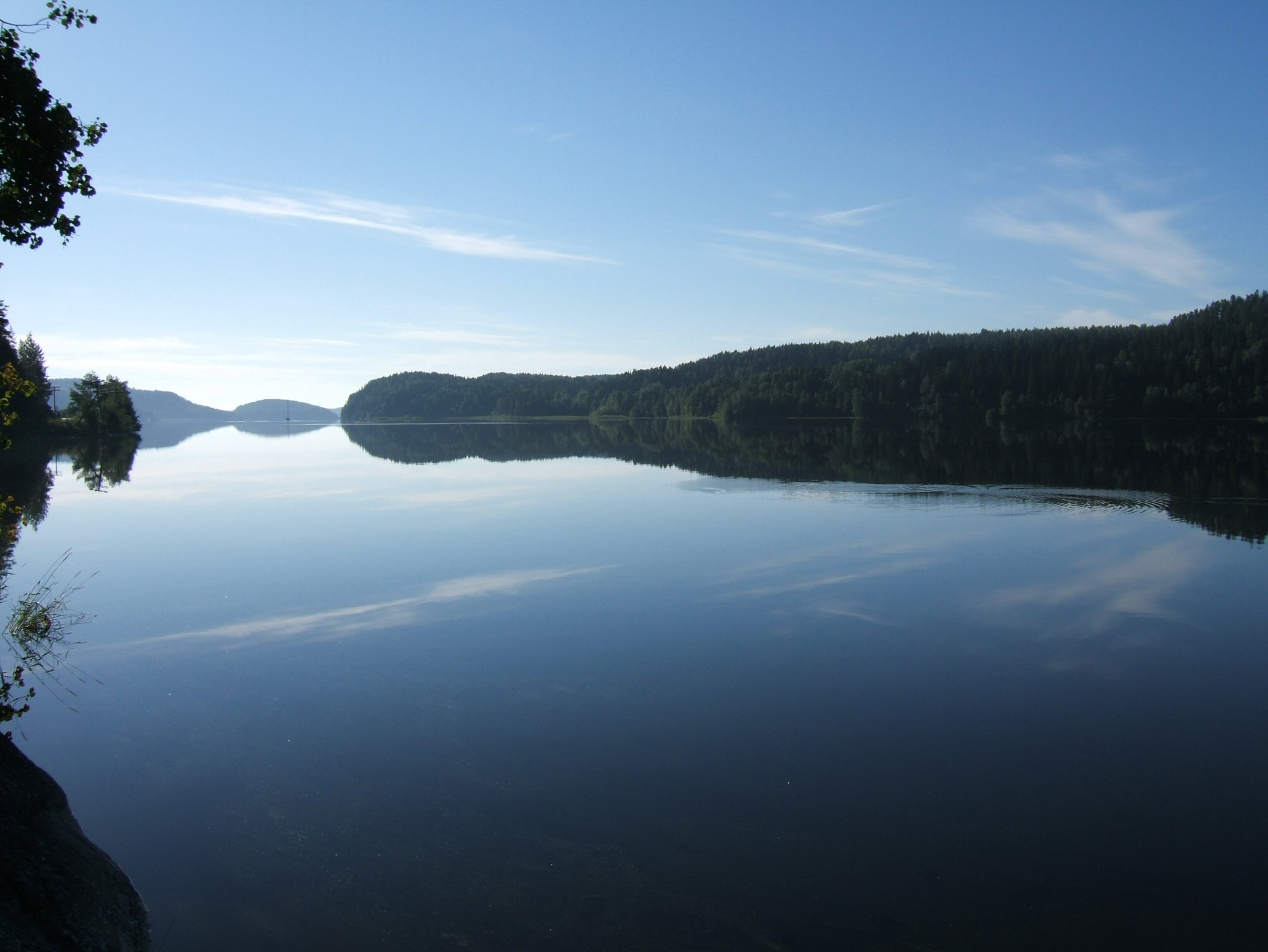

- Location in Russia
- Interactive map of Lake Ladoga
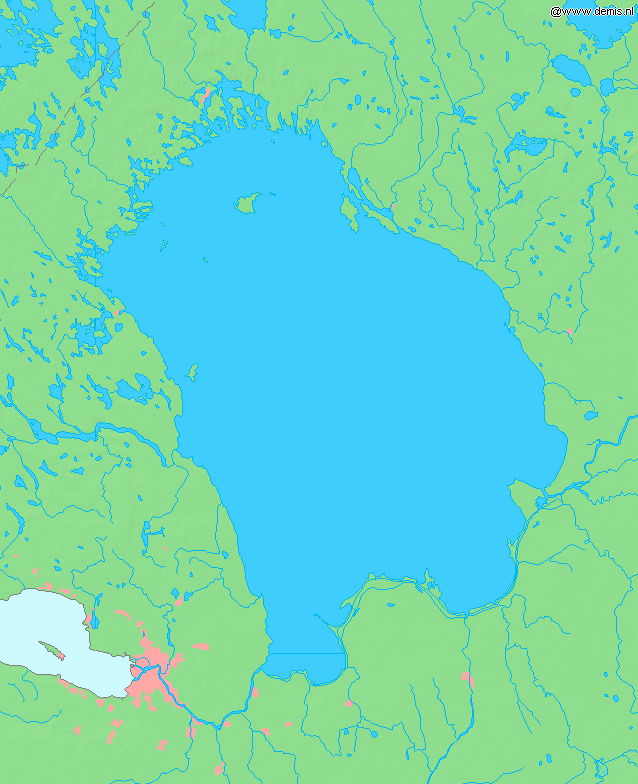
- Large-scale map
- Location: Northwestern Russia (Leningrad Oblast and the Republic of Karelia)
- Coordinates: 61°00′N 31°30′E
- Primary inflows: Svir, Volkhov, Vuoksi
- Primary outflows: Neva
- Catchment area: 276,000 km^{2} (107,000 sq mi)
- Basin countries: Russia; Finland (minor)
- Max. length: 219 km (136 mi)
- Max. width: 138 km (86 mi)
- Surface area: 17,891 km^{2} (6,908 sq mi)
- Average depth: 47.3 m (155 ft)
- Max. depth: 230–260 m (750–850 ft)
- Water volume: 837 km^{3} (201 cu mi)
- Surface elevation: 5 m (16 ft)
- Islands: about 660 (including Valaam)
- Settlements: see list

Lake Ladoga (Note: /ˈlædəɡə/ LAD-ə-gə; Russian: Ладожское озеро, romanized: Ládozhskoye ózero, IPA: [ˈɫadəʂskəje ˈozʲɪrə] (or simply Ладога, Ládoga, IPA: [ˈɫadəɡə]); Finnish: Laatokka (Nevajärvi in earlier sources); Livvi: Luadogu; Veps: Ladog(anjärv); Ludian: Aldog) is a freshwater lake located in the Republic of Karelia and Leningrad Oblast in northwestern Russia, in the vicinity of Saint Petersburg.

It is the largest lake located entirely in Europe, the second largest lake in Russia after Lake Baikal, and the 14th largest lake by area in the world. It is comparable in size to Lake Ontario. Ladoga Lacus, a methane lake on Saturn's moon Titan, is named after the lake.

== Etymology ==
In one of Nestor's chronicles from the 12th century a lake called "the Great Nevo" is mentioned, a clear link to the Neva River and possibly further to Finnish nevo 'sea' or neva 'bog, quagmire'.

Ancient Norse sagas and Hanseatic treaties both mention a city made of lakes named Old Norse Aldeigja or Aldoga. Since the beginning of the 14th century this hydronym was commonly known as Ladoga. According to T. N. Jackson, it can be taken "almost for granted that the name of Ladoga first referred to the river, then the city, and only then the lake". Therefore, he considers the primary hydronym Ladoga to originate in the eponymous inflow to the lower reaches of the Volkhov River whose early Finnic name was Alodejoki (corresponding to modern Finnish: Alojen joki) 'river of the lowlands'.

The Germanic toponym (Aldeigja ~ Aldoga) was soon borrowed by the Slavic population and transformed by means of the Old East Slavic metathesis ald- → lad- to Old East Slavic: Ладога. The Old Norse intermediary word between Finnish and Old East Slavic word is fully supported by archeology, since the Scandinavians first appeared in Ladoga in the early 750s, that is, a couple of decades before the Slavs.

Other hypotheses about the origin of the name derive it from Karelian: aalto 'wave' and Karelian: aaltokas 'wavy', or from the Russian dialectal word алодь, meaning 'open lake, extensive water field'. Eugene Helimski by contrast, offers a Germanic etymology. In his opinion, the primary name of the lake was Old Norse: *Aldauga 'old source', associated to the open sea, in contrast to the name of the Neva River (flowing from Lake Ladoga) which would derive from the Germanic expression for 'the new'. Through the intermediate form *Aldaugja, Old Norse: Aldeigja came about, referring to the city of Ladoga.

== Geography ==
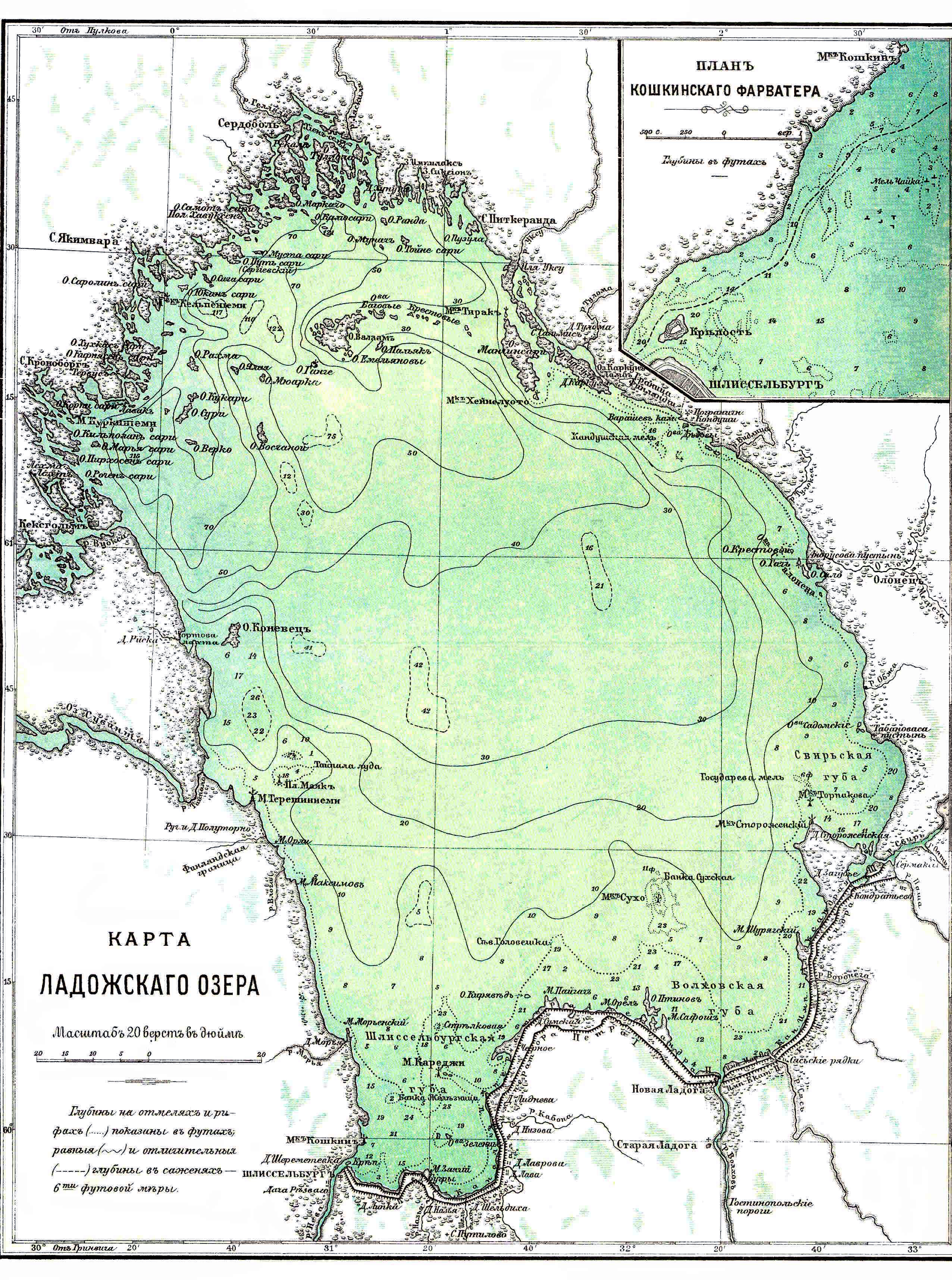
Lake Ladoga, as illustrated in the Brockhaus and Efron Encyclopedic Dictionary (1890—1907)

The lake has an average surface area of 17,891 km^{2} (excluding the islands), slightly larger than Kuwait. Its north-to-south length is 219 km and its average width is 83 km; the average depth is 47 m, although it reaches a maximum of 230 m in the north-western part. Basin area: 276,000 km^{2}, volume: 837 km^{3} (earlier estimated as 908 km^{3}). There are around 660 islands, with a total area of about 435 km^{2}. Ladoga is, on average, 5 m above sea level. Most of the islands, including the famous Valaam archipelago, Kilpola and Konevets, are situated in the northwest of the lake.

Separated from the Baltic Sea by the Karelian Isthmus, it drains into the Gulf of Finland via the Neva River.

Lake Ladoga is navigable, being a part of the Volga–Baltic Waterway connecting the Baltic Sea with the Volga River. The Ladoga Canal bypasses the lake in the south, connecting the Neva to the Svir.

The basin of Lake Ladoga includes about 50,000 lakes and 3,500 rivers longer than 10 km. About 85% of the water inflow is due to tributaries, 13% is due to precipitation, and 2% is due to underground waters.

== Geological history ==
Ancylus Lake around 7,000 BC.

Geologically, the Lake Ladoga depression is a graben and syncline structure of Proterozoic age (Precambrian). This "Ladoga–Pasha structure", as it is known, hosts Jotnian sediments. During the Pleistocene glaciations the depression was partially stripped of its sedimentary rock fill by glacial overdeepening. During the Last Interglacial (Eemian), around 130-115,000 years ago, the lake formed part of marine channel between the Baltic and White Seas.

During the Last Glacial Maximum, about 17,000 years BP, the lake served likely as a channel that concentrated ice of the Fennoscandian Ice Sheet into an ice stream that fed glacier lobes further east.

Deglaciation following the Weichselian glaciation took place in the Lake Ladoga basin between 12,500 and 11,500 radiocarbon years BP. Lake Ladoga was initially part of the Baltic Ice Lake (70–80 m. above present sea level), a historical freshwater stage of Baltic Sea. It is possible, though not certain, that Ladoga was isolated from it during regression of the subsequent Yoldia Sea brackish stage (10,200–9,500 BP). The isolation threshold should be at Heinjoki to the east of Vyborg, where the Baltic Sea and Ladoga were connected by a strait or a river outlet at least until the formation of the River Neva, and possibly even much later, until the 12th century AD or so.

At 9,500 BP, Lake Onega, previously draining into the White Sea, started emptying into Ladoga via the River Svir. Between 9,500 and 9,100 BP, during the transgression of Ancylus Lake, the next freshwater stage of the Baltic, Ladoga certainly became part of it, even if they hadn't been connected immediately before. During the Ancylus Lake subsequent regression, around 8,800 BP Ladoga became isolated.

Ladoga slowly transgressed in its southern part due to uplift of the Baltic Shield in the north. It has been hypothesized, but not proven, that waters of the Litorina Sea, the next brackish-water stage of the Baltic, occasionally invaded Ladoga between 7,000 and 5,000 BP. Around 5,000 BP the waters of the Saimaa Lake penetrated Salpausselkä and formed a new outlet, River Vuoksi, entering Lake Ladoga in the northwestern corner and raising its level by 1–2 m.

The River Neva originated when the Ladoga waters at last broke through the threshold at Porogi into the lower portions of Izhora River, then a tributary of the Gulf of Finland, between 4,000 and 2,000 BP. Dating of some sediments in the northwestern part of Lake Ladoga suggests it happened at 3,100 radiocarbon years BP (3,410–3,250 calendar years BP).

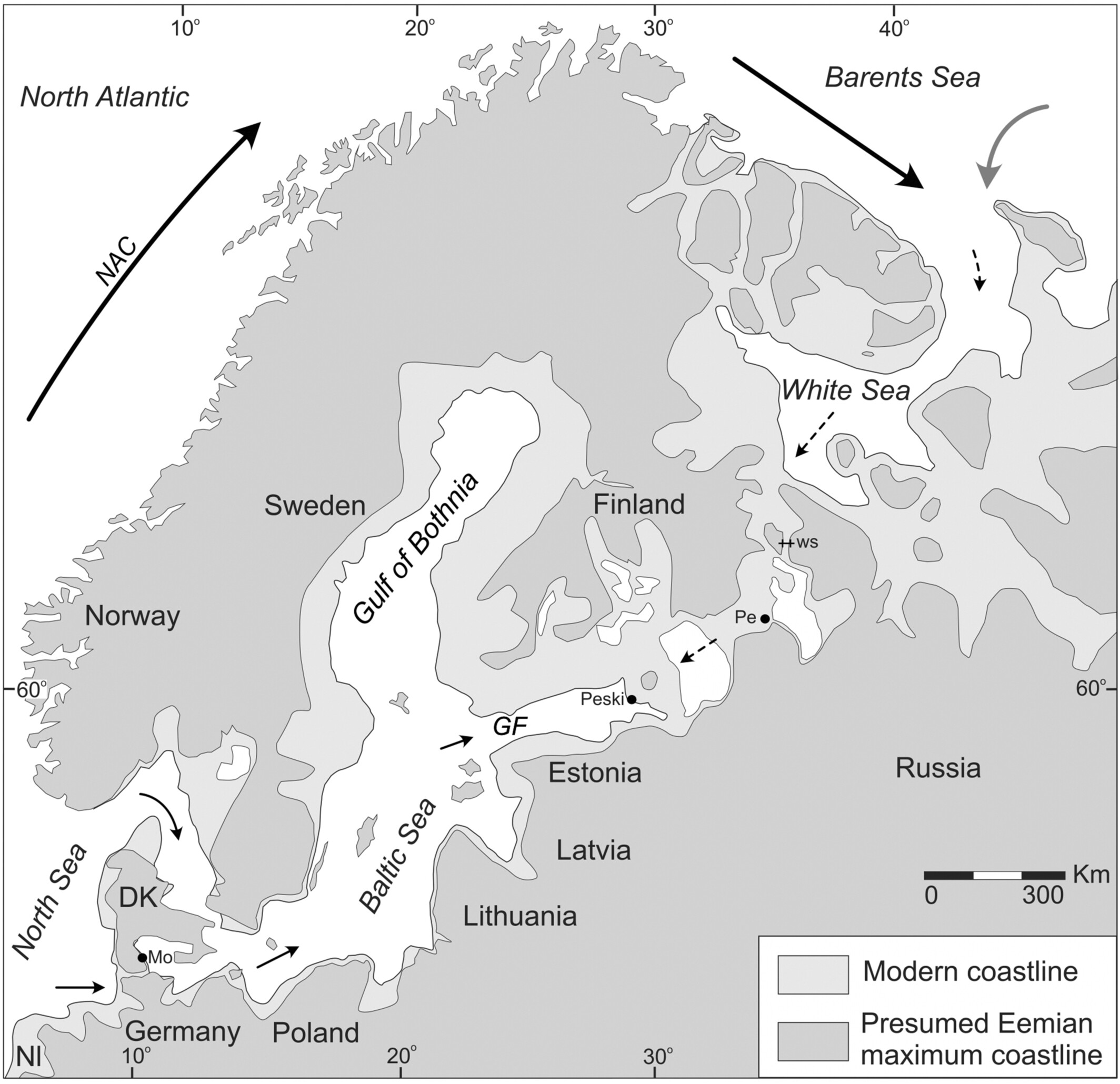
Map of the Baltic-White Sea region during the Last Interglacial (115-130,000 years ago), showing Lake Ladoga as part of a marine passageway between the Baltic and White Seas

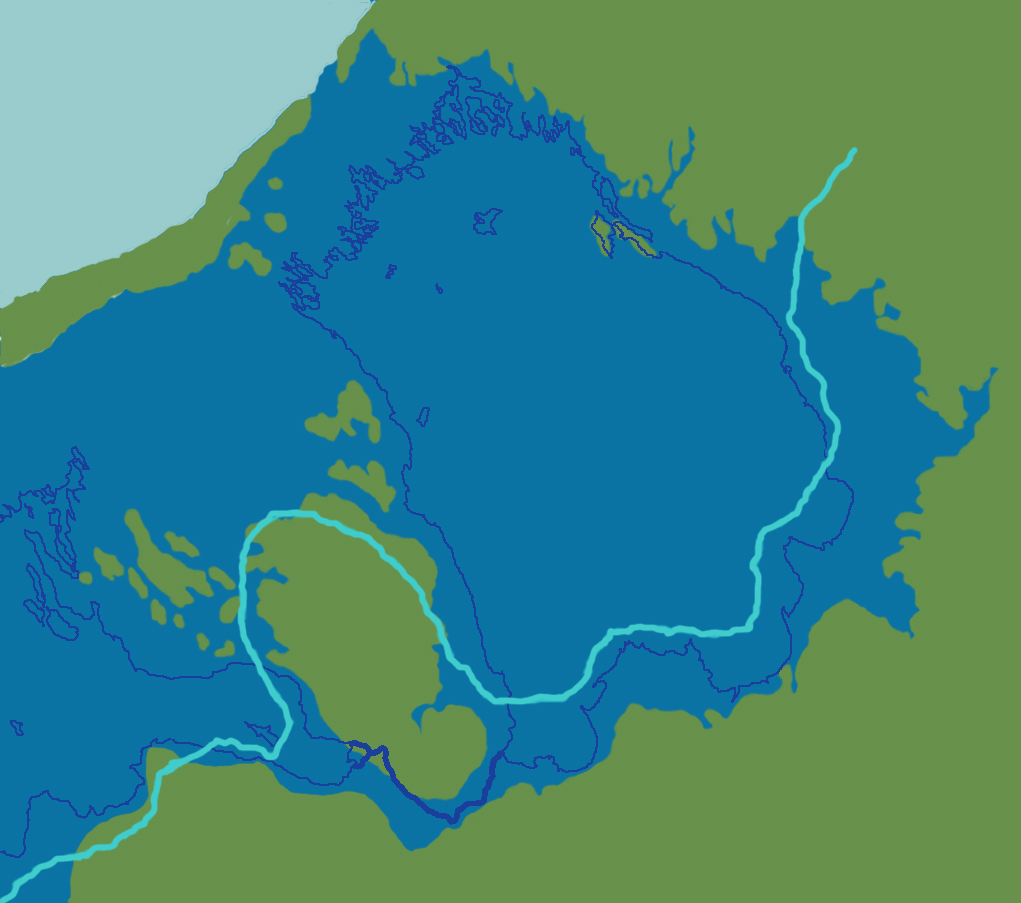
Lake Ladoga as part of the Baltic Ice Lake (between 11200 and 10500 yr BP). The light blue line marks the margin of the ice sheet by 13300 cal yr BP.

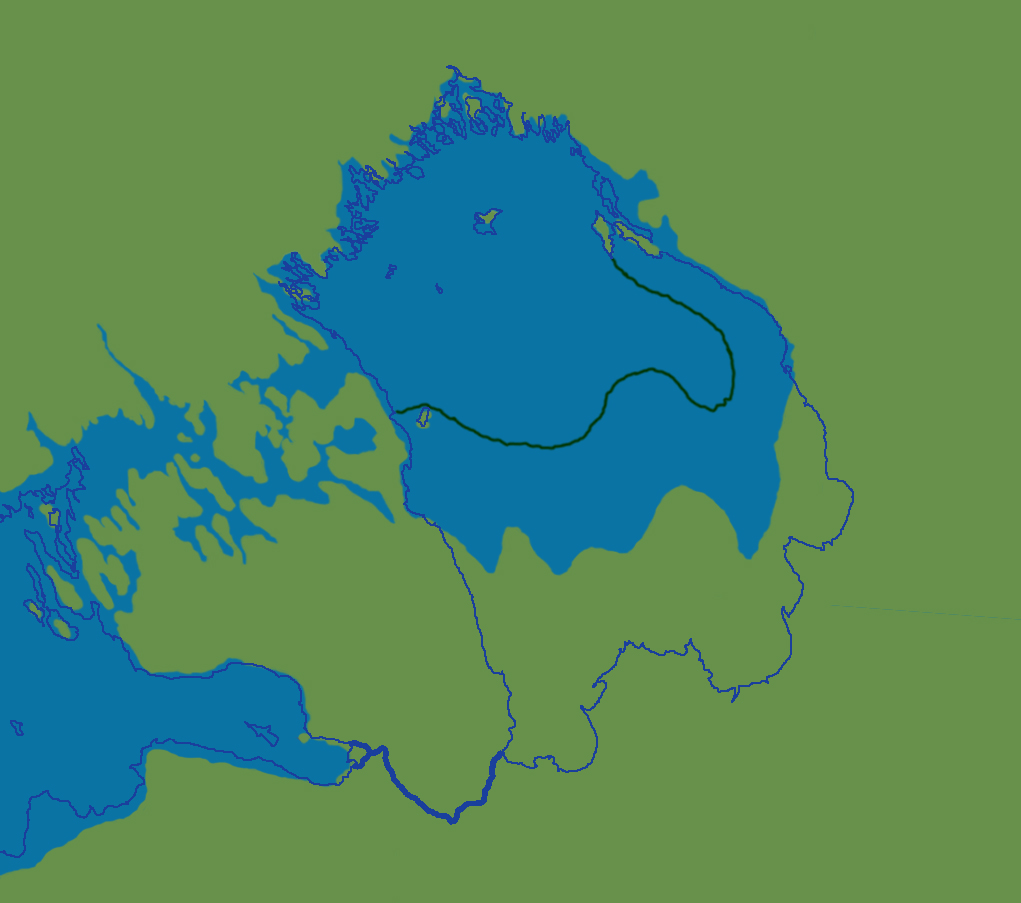
Lake Ladoga as part of the Ancylus Lake (between 9300 and 9200 yr BP). The dark green line marks the southern shoreline of Lake Ladoga during the Yoldia stage of the Baltic basin.

== Wildlife ==
The Ladoga is rich with fish. Forty-eight forms (species and infra specific taxa) of fish have been encountered in the lake, including roach, carp bream, zander, European perch, ruffe, endemic variety of smelt, two varieties of Coregonus albula (vendace), eight varieties of Coregonus lavaretus, a number of other Salmonidae as well as, albeit rarely, endangered Atlantic sturgeon (formerly confused with European sea sturgeon). Commercial fishing was once a major industry but has been hurt by overfishing. After the war, between 1945 and 1954, the total annual catch increased and reached a maximum of 4,900 tonnes. However, unbalanced fishery led to the drastic decrease of catch in 1955–1963, sometimes to 1,600 tonnes per year. Trawling has been forbidden in Lake Ladoga since 1956 and some other restrictions were imposed. The situation gradually recovered, and in 1971–1990 the catch ranged between 4,900 and 6,900 tonnes per year, about the same level as the total catch in 1938. Fish farms and recreational fishing are developing.

It has its own endemic ringed seal subspecies known as the Ladoga seal.

Since the beginning of the 1960s Ladoga has become considerably eutrophicated.

Nizhnesvirsky Natural Reserve is situated along the shore of Lake Ladoga immediately to the north of the mouth of the River Svir.

The Ladoga has a population of Arctic char that is genetically close to the chars of Lake Sommen and Lake Vättern in southern Sweden.

== History ==
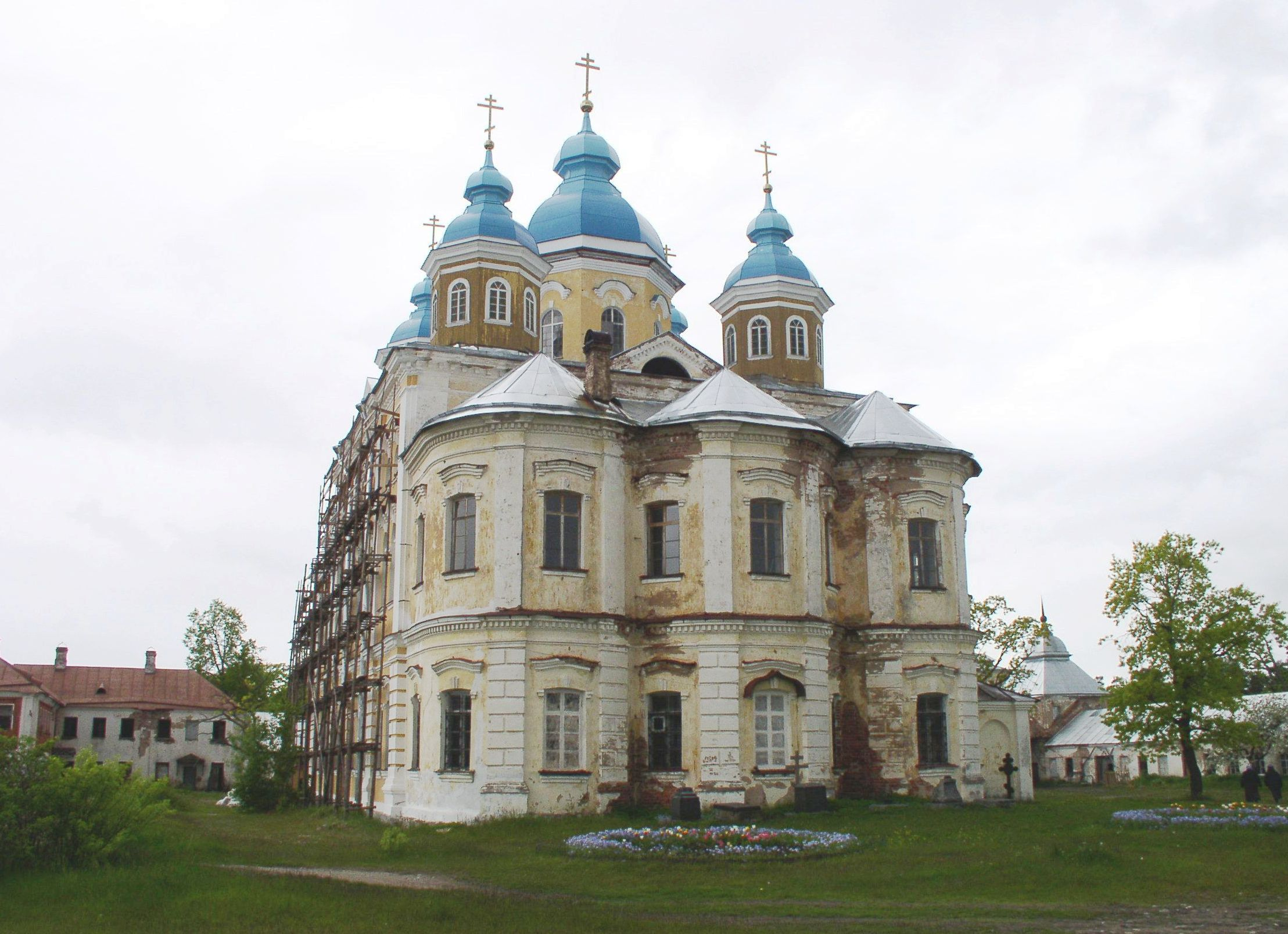
Konevsky monastery

In the Middle Ages, the lake formed a vital part of the trade route from the Varangians to the Eastern Roman Empire, with the Norse emporium at Staraya Ladoga defending the mouth of the Volkhov since the 8th century. In the course of the Swedish–Novgorodian Wars, the area was disputed between the Novgorod Republic and Sweden. In the early 14th century, the fortresses of Korela (Kexholm) and Oreshek (Nöteborg) were established along the banks of the lake.

During the Russo-Swedish War of 1656–1658, the Swedes deployed several armed vessels (called Lodja) on Lake Ladoga to combat the Russians though no large sea battles were fought.

The ancient Valaam Monastery was founded on the island of Valaam, the largest in Lake Ladoga, abandoned between 1611 and 1715, restored in the 18th century, and evacuated to Finland during the Winter War in 1940. In 1989 the monastic activities in the Valaam were resumed. Other historic cloisters in the vicinity are the Konevets Monastery, which sits on the Konevets island, and the Alexander-Svirsky Monastery, which preserves samples of medieval Muscovite architecture.

During the Ingrian War, a fraction of the Ladoga coast was occupied by Sweden. In 1617, by the Treaty of Stolbovo, the northern and western coast was ceded by Russia to Sweden. In 1721, after the Great Northern War, it was restitutioned to Russia by the Treaty of Nystad. In the 18th century, the Ladoga Canal was built to bypass the lake which was prone to winds and storms that destroyed hundreds of cargo ships.

Later, from around 1812–1940 the lake was shared between Finland and Russia. According to the conditions of the 1920 Tartu Peace Treaty militarization of the lake was severely restricted. However, both Soviet Russia and Finland had flotillas in Ladoga (see also Finnish Ladoga Naval Detachment). After the Winter War (1939–40) according to the Moscow Peace Treaty, Ladoga, previously shared with Finland, became an internal basin of the Soviet Union.

During World War II not only Finnish and Soviet, but also German and Italian vessels operated there (see also Naval Detachment K and Regia Marina). Under these circumstances, during much of the Siege of Leningrad (1941–44), Lake Ladoga provided the only access to the besieged city as a section of the eastern shore remained in Soviet hands. Supplies were transported into Leningrad with trucks on winter roads over the ice, the "Road of Life", and by boat in the summer. After World War II, Finland lost the Karelia region again to the USSR, and all Finnish citizens were evacuated from the ceded territory. Ladoga became an internal Soviet basin once again. The northern shore, Ladoga Karelia with the town of Sortavala, is now part of the Republic of Karelia. The western shore, Karelian Isthmus, became part of Leningrad Oblast.

== Lists ==
=== Tributaries ===
(incomplete list)

- Svir River from Lake Onega (south-east, discharge: 790 m^{3}/s);
- Volkhov River from Lake Ilmen (south, discharge: 580 m^{3}/s);
- Vuoksi River (and Burnaya River) from Lake Saimaa in Finland (west, discharge: 540 m^{3}/s).
- Syas River (south, discharge: 53 m^{3}/s).
- Olonka River from Lake Utozero

=== Towns upon the lake ===
- Shlisselburg (at 59°56′N 31°02′E)
- Novaya Ladoga (at 60°06′N 32°18′E)
- Syasstroy (at 60°08′N 32°34′E)
- Pitkyaranta (at 61°34′N 31°28′E)
- Sortavala (at 61°42′N 30°41′E)
- Lakhdenpokhya (at 61°31′N 30°12′E)
- Priozersk (at 61°02′N 30°08′E)

== Image gallery ==
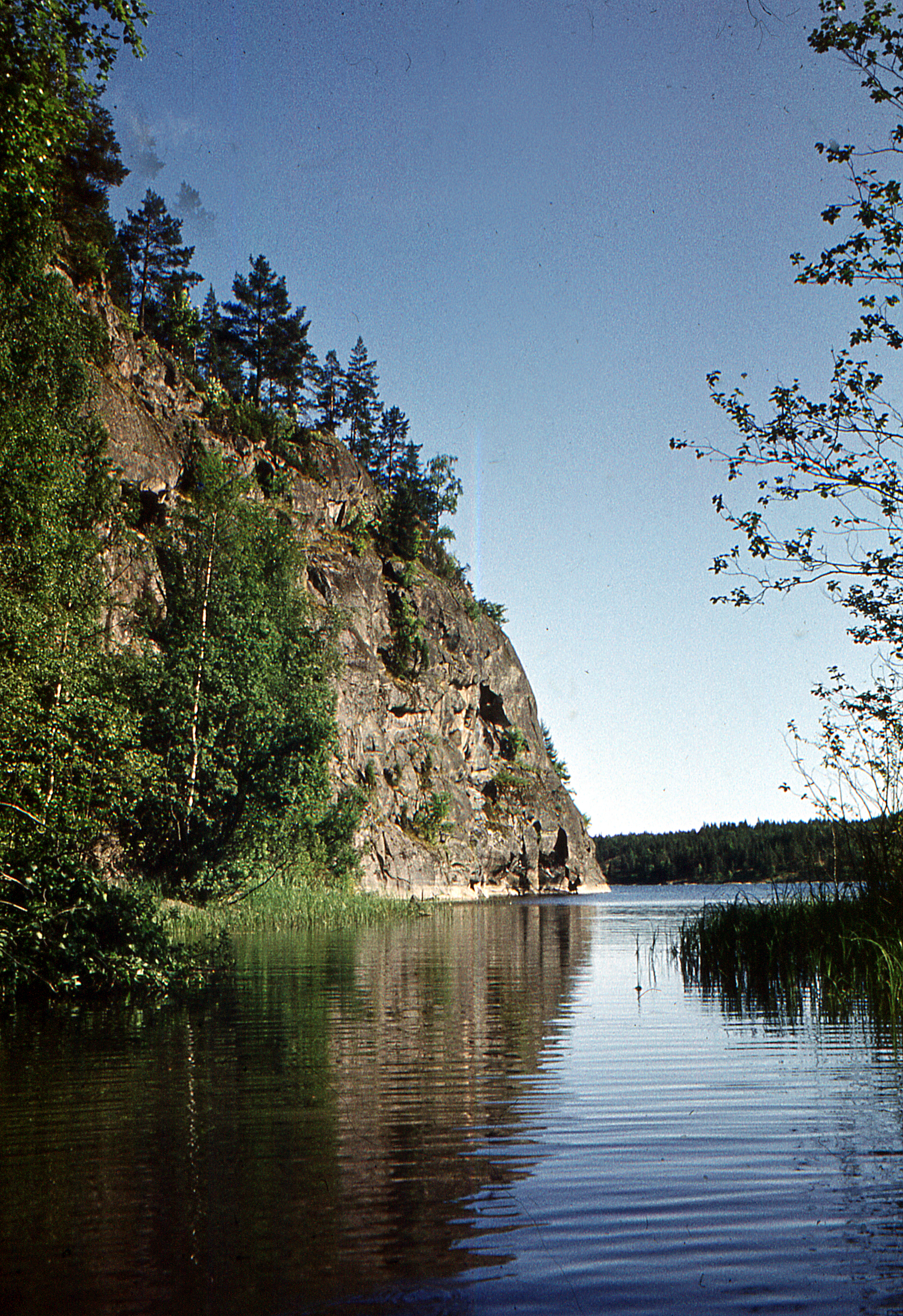
Rocky shore

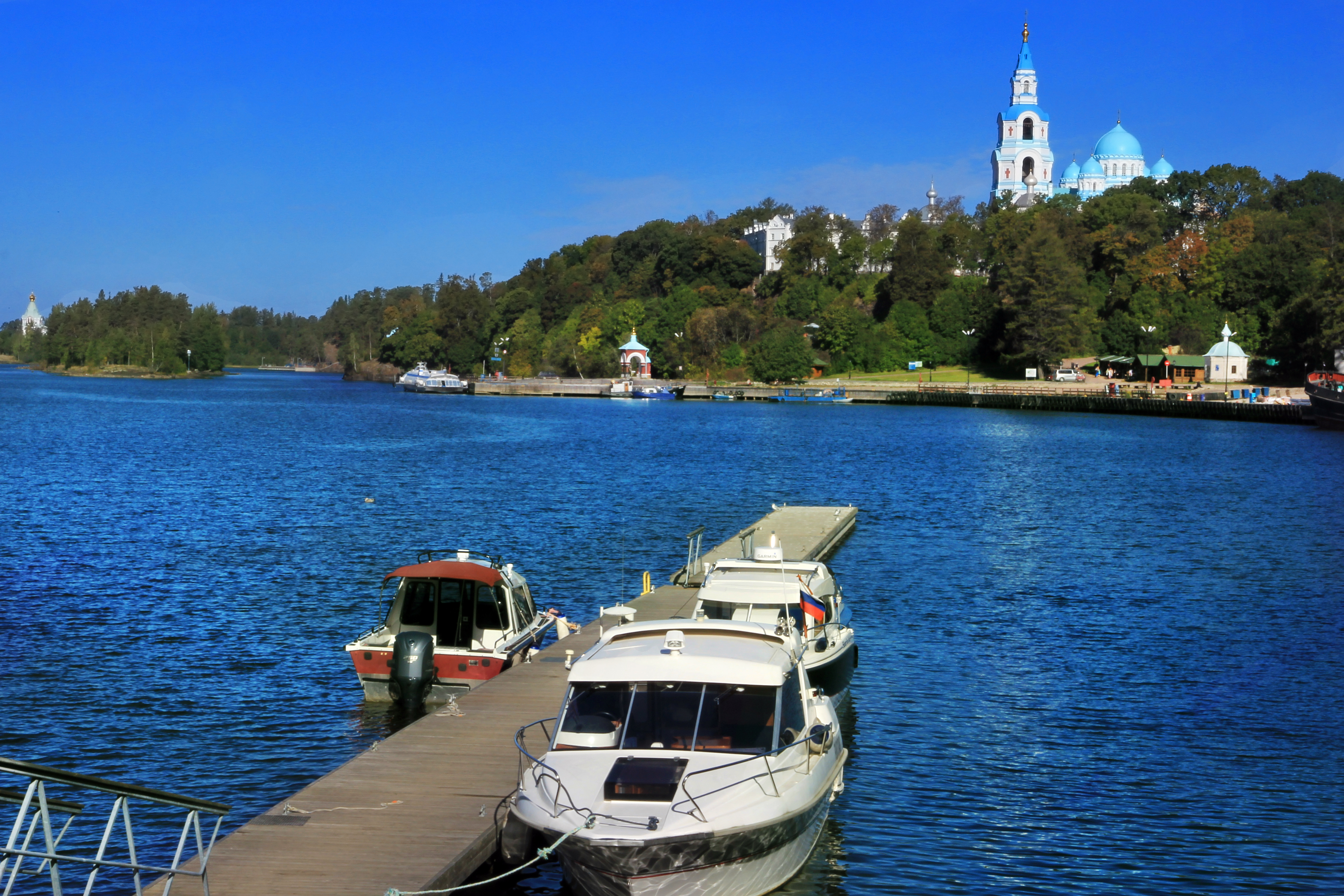
The archipelago in Ladoga Lake with the Monastery of the Transfiguration of the Saviour

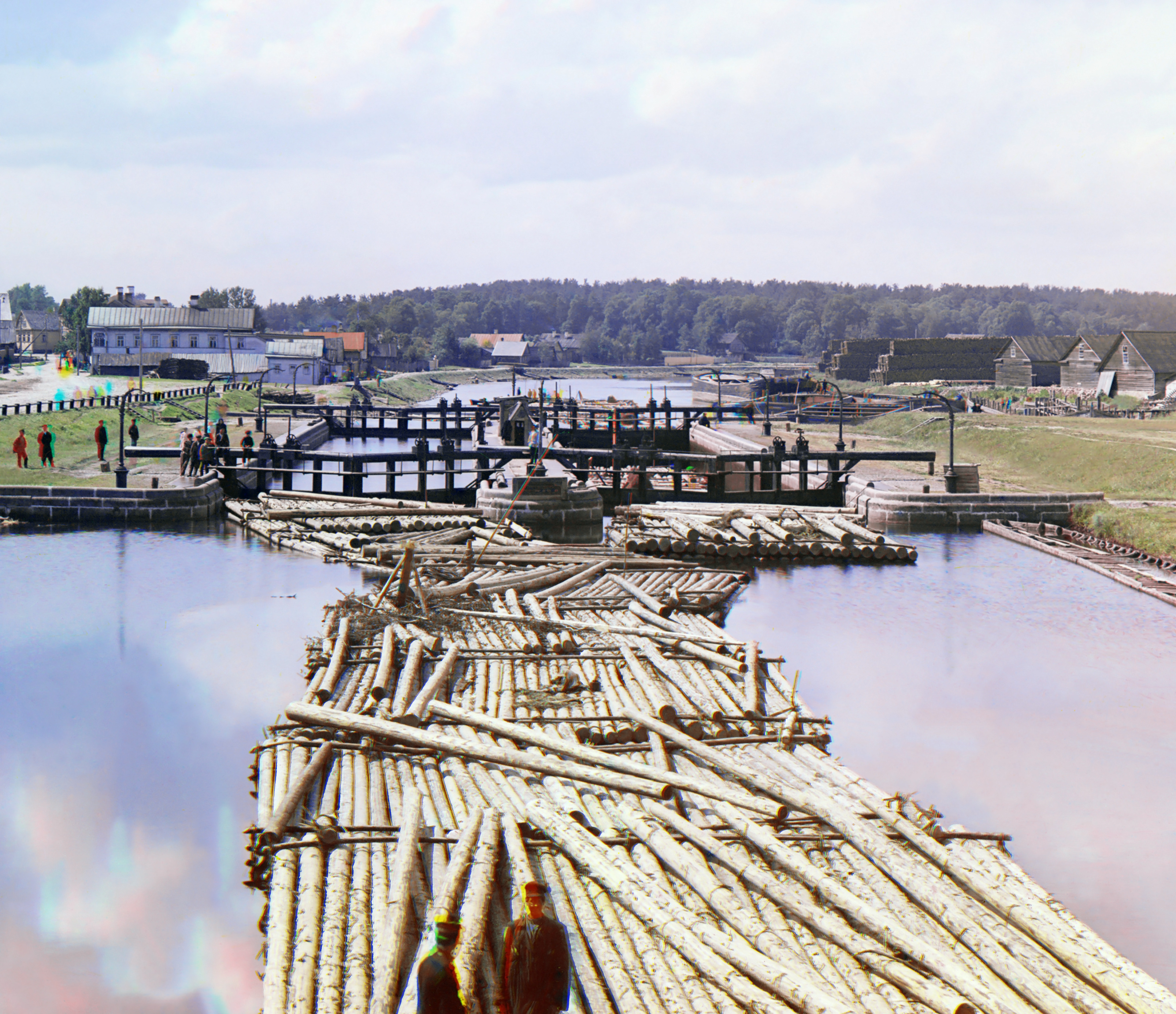
Rafts on the Peter the Great Canal. City of Shlisselburg

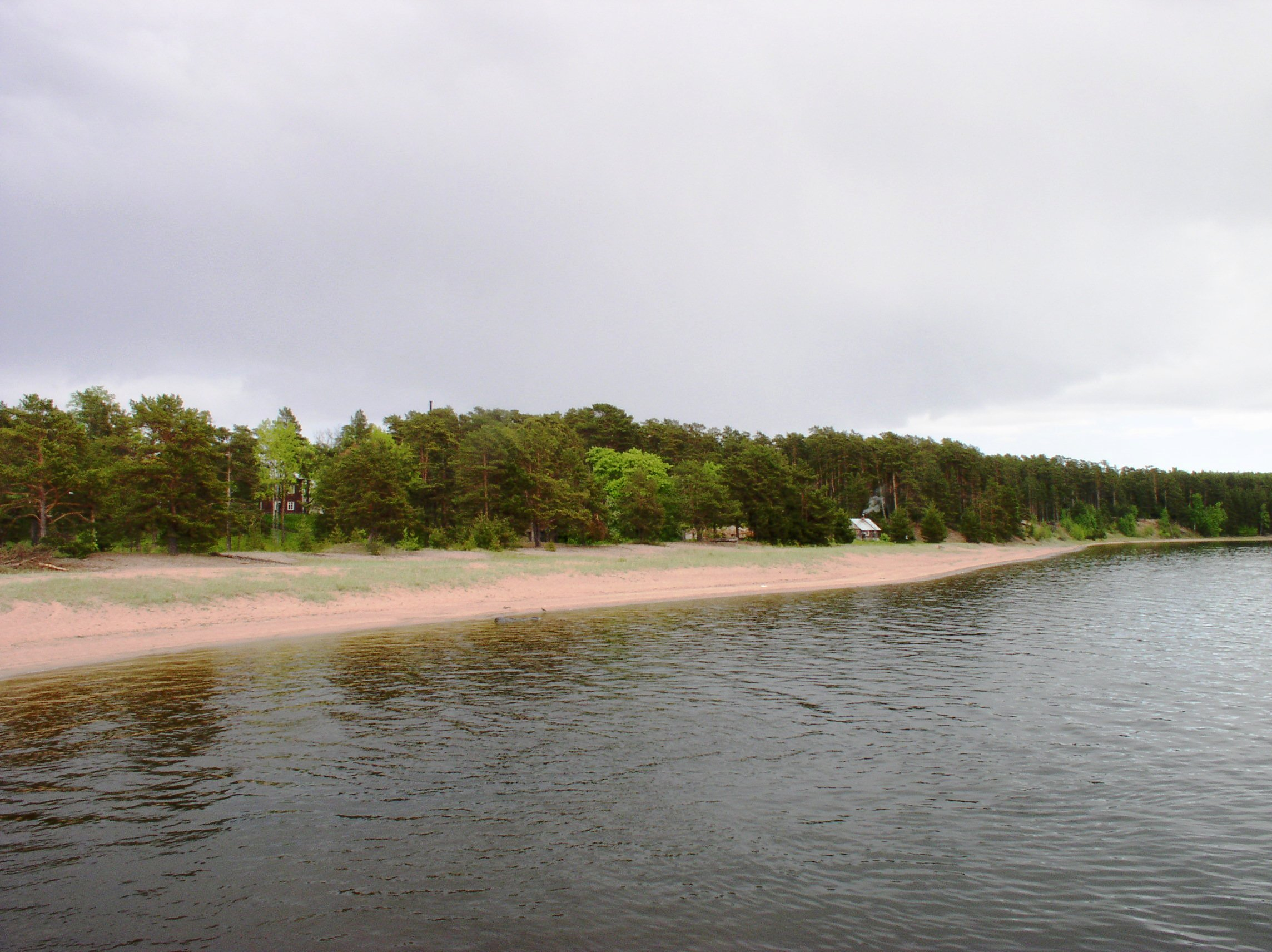
Konevets Island

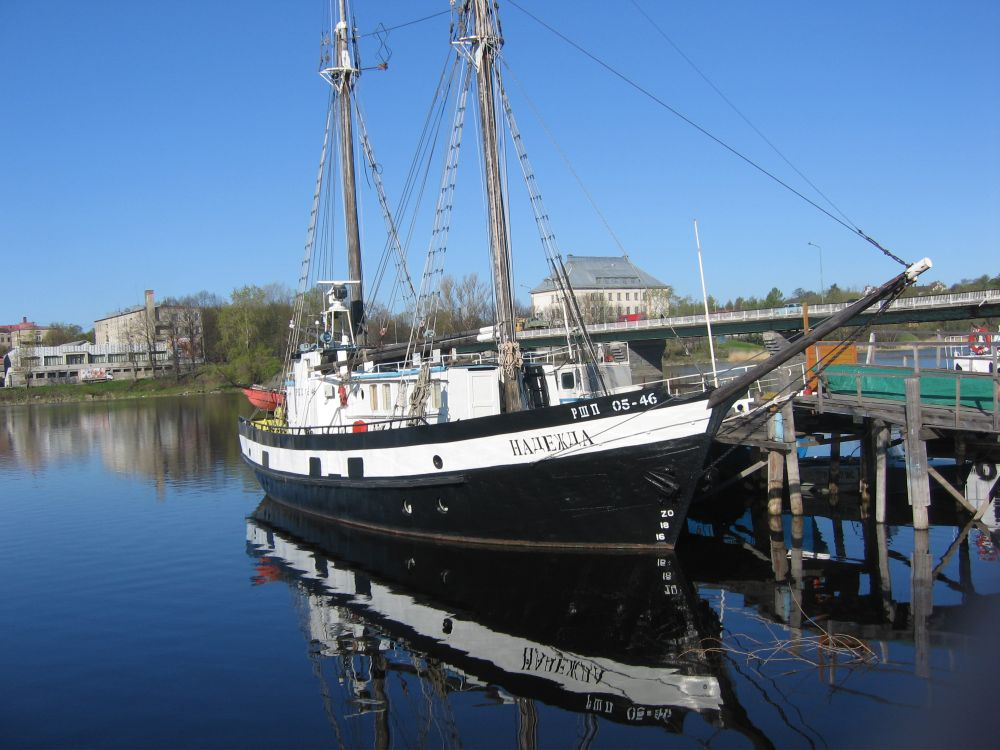
Sortavala harbour, Karelia

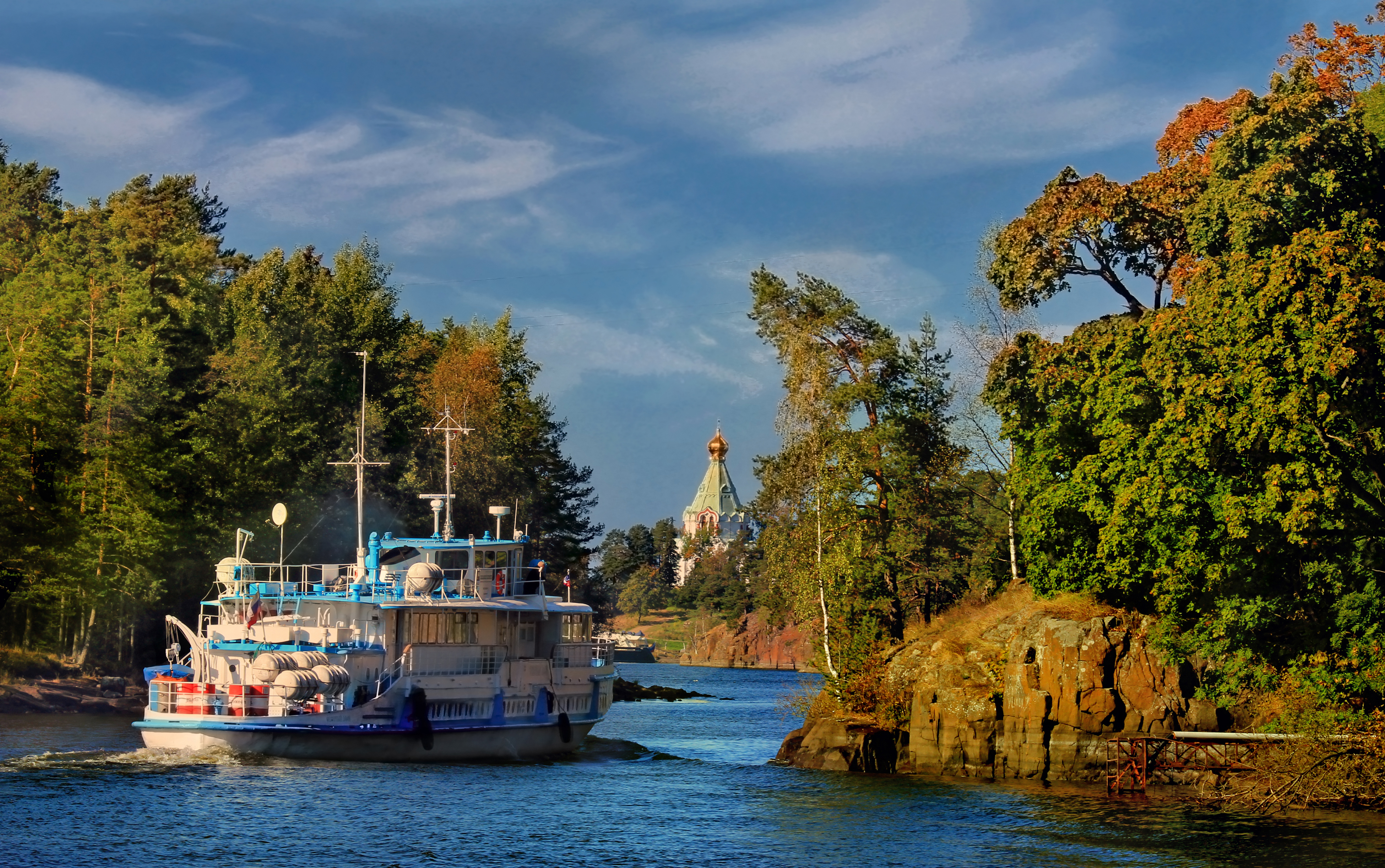
Saint Nicholas Skete on island Valaam on Ladoga lake and little ship

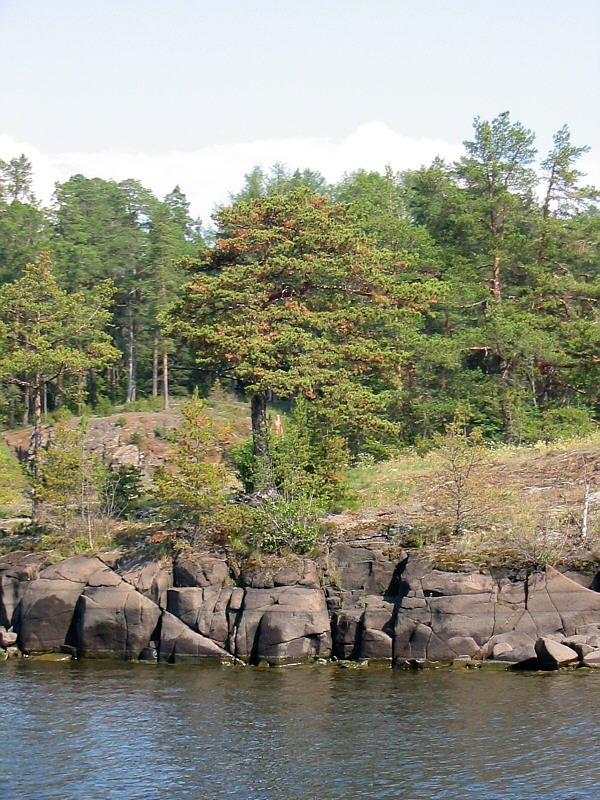
Valaam

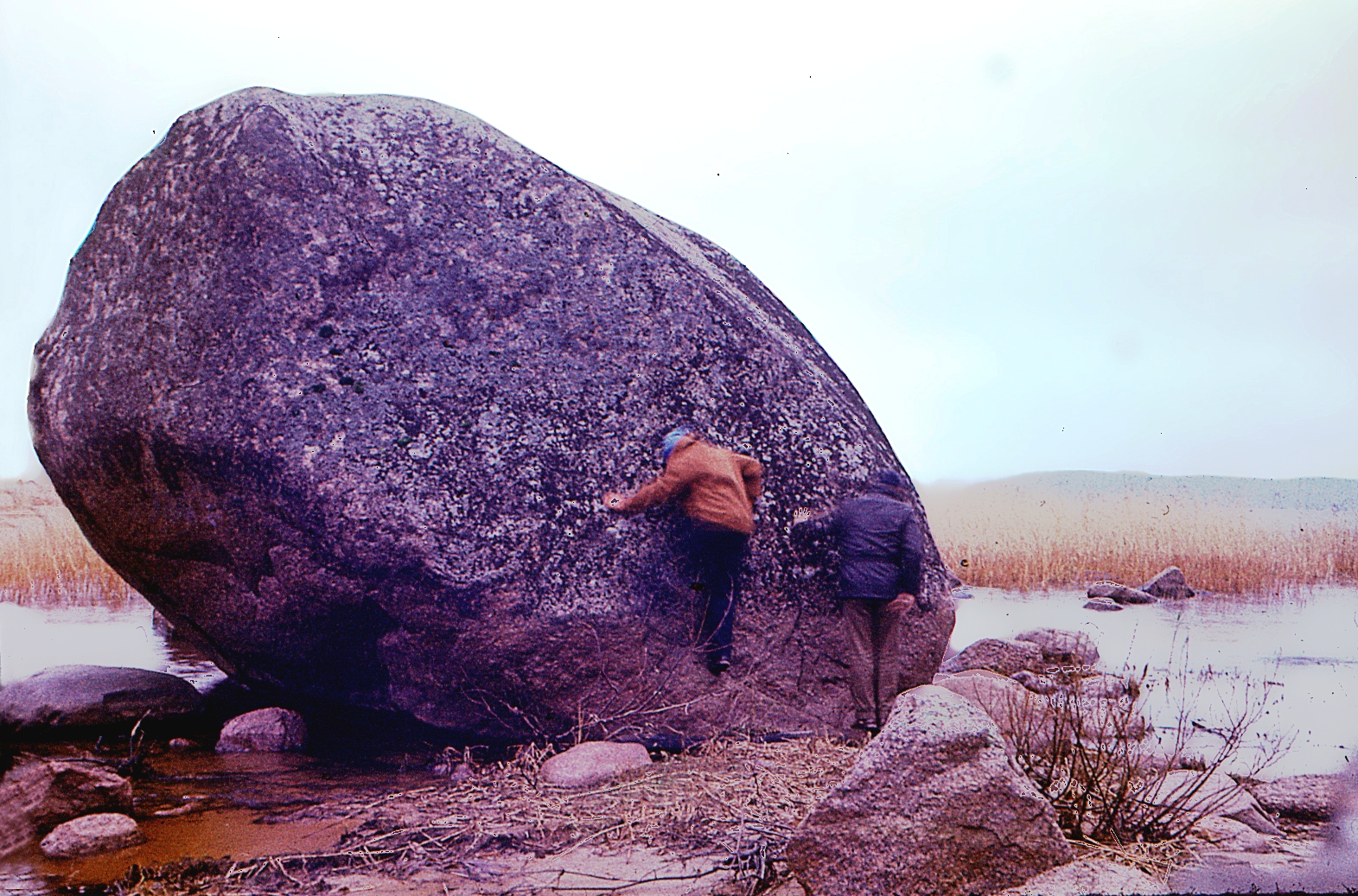
Boulder on Vidlitsa, west shore

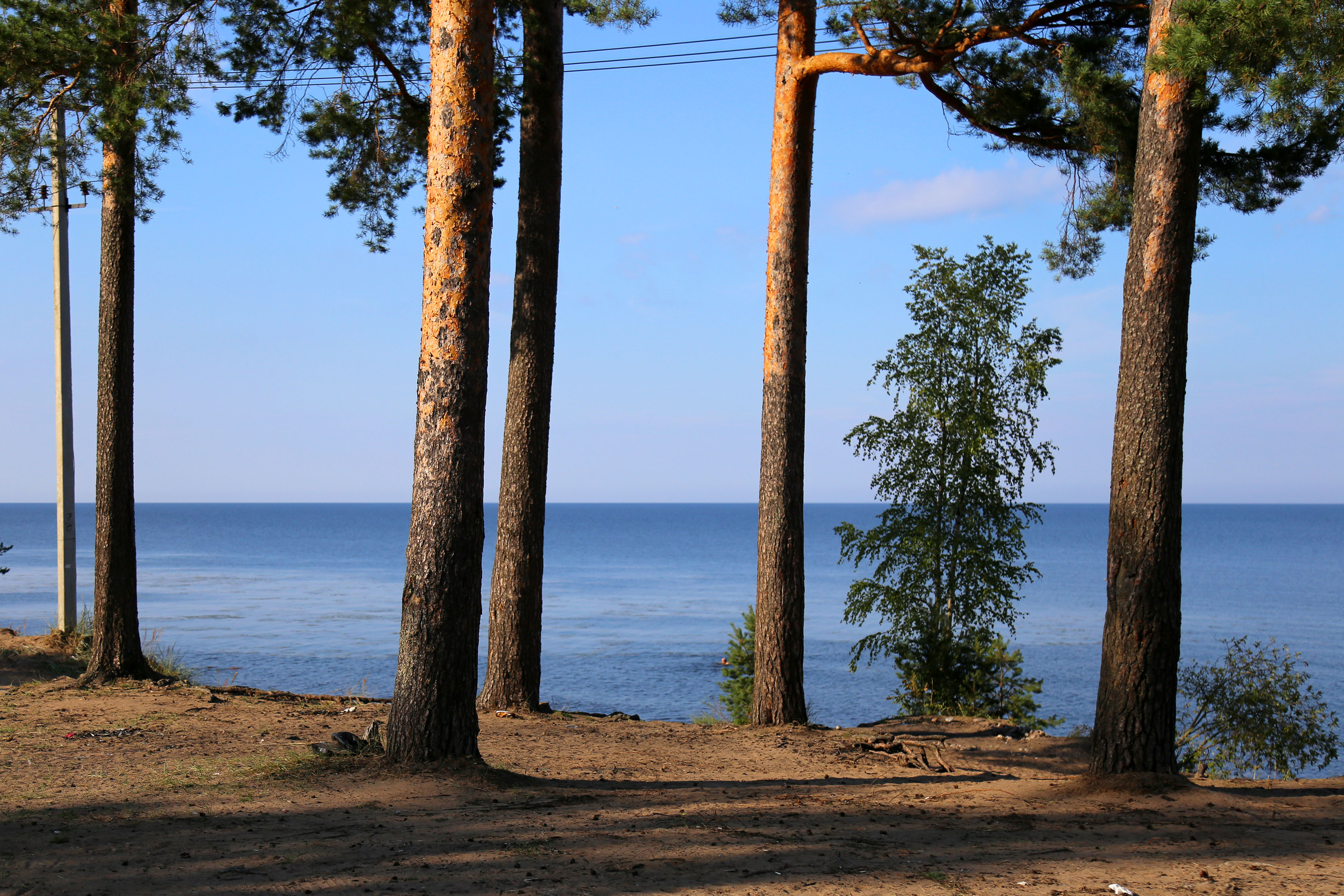
Lake Ladoga, Russia

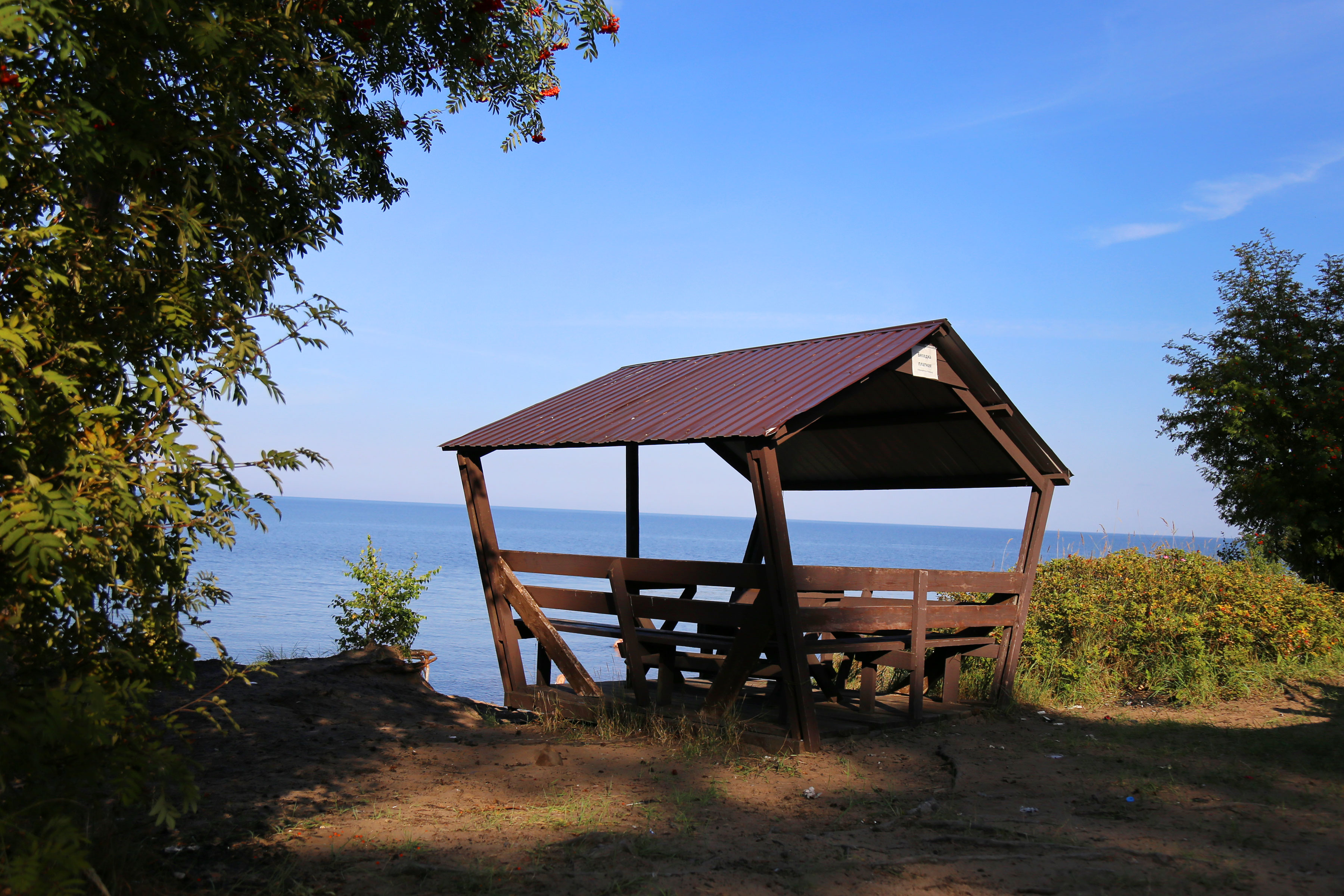
Lake Ladoga, Russia

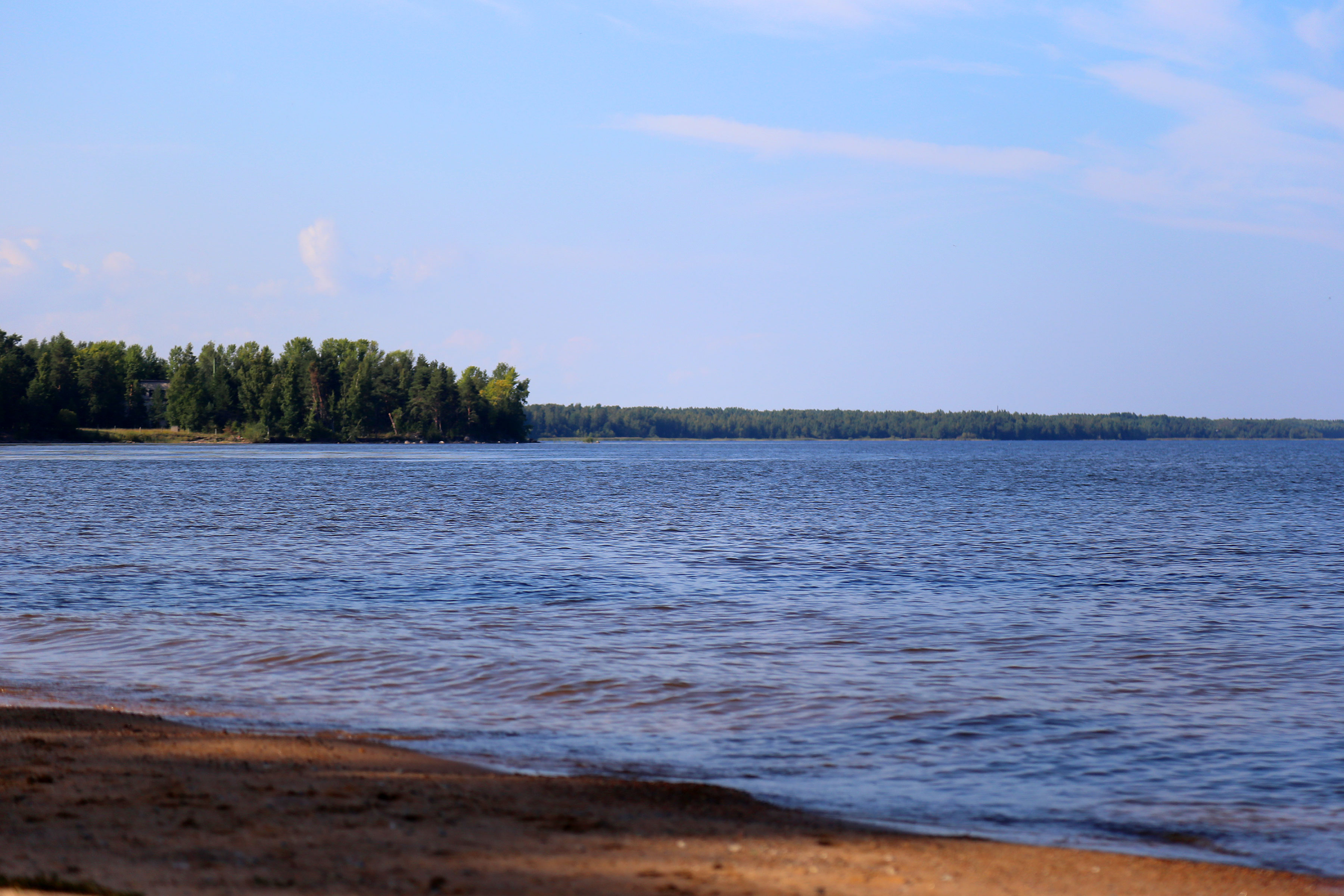
Lake Ladoga, Russia

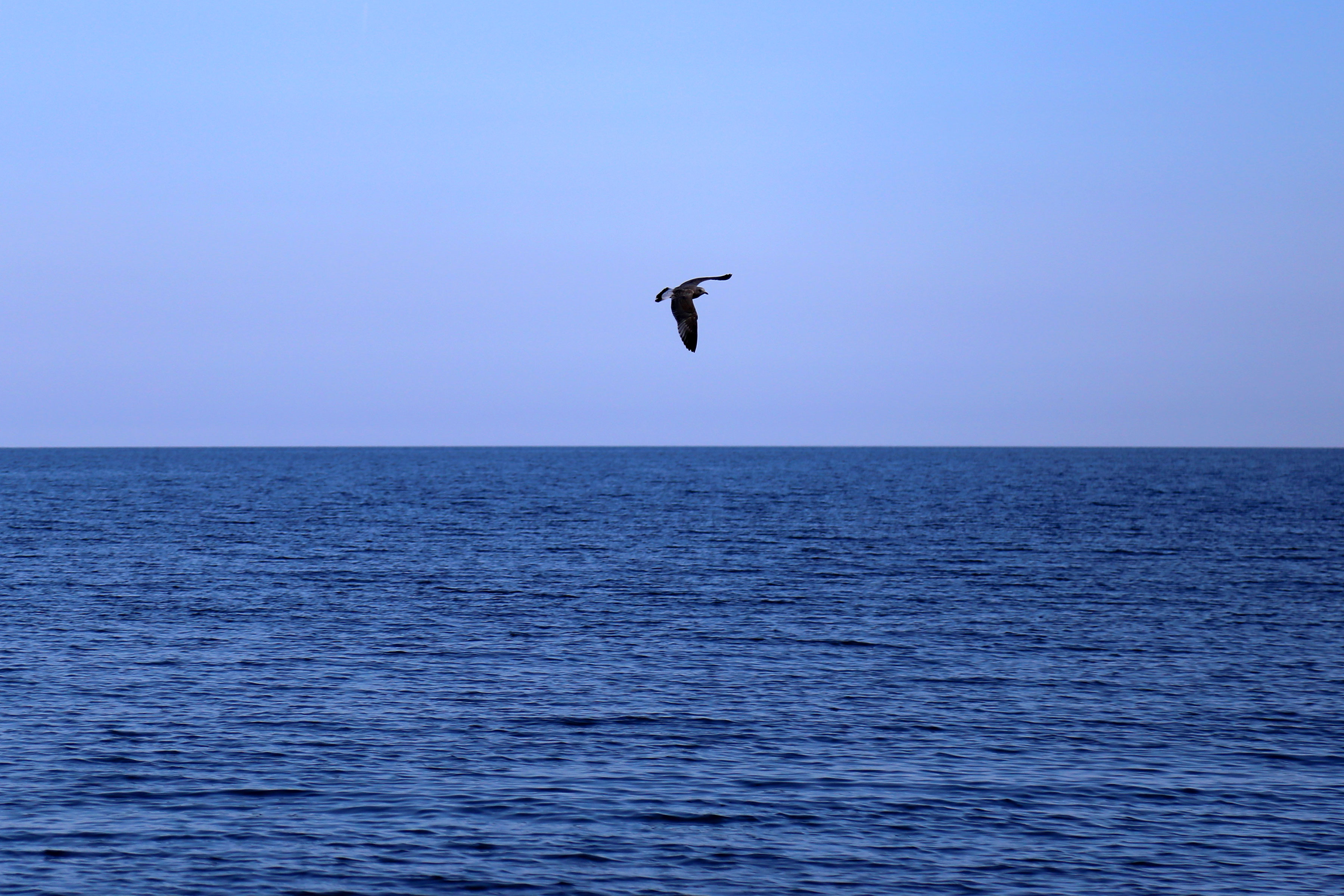
Lake Ladoga, Russia

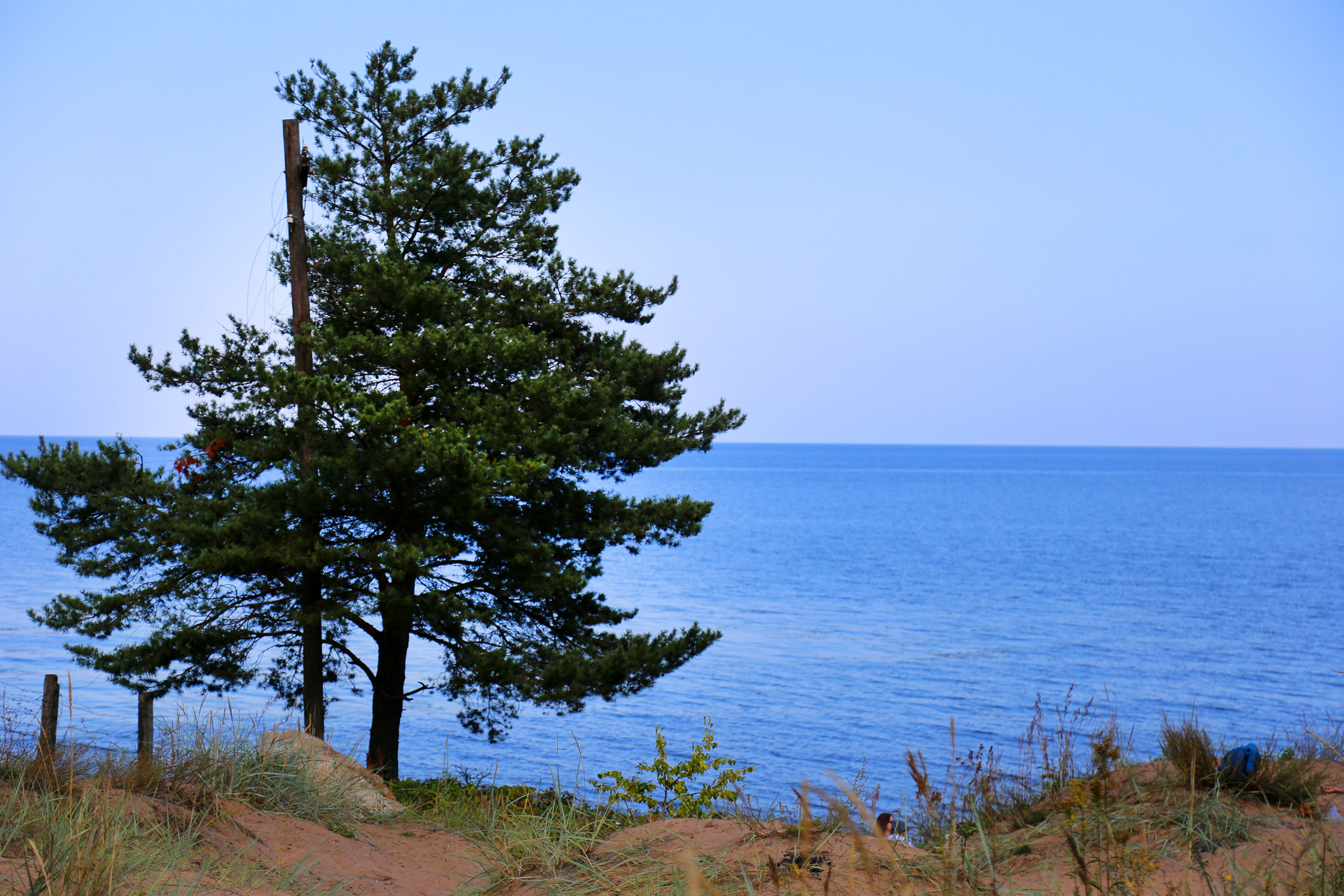
Lake Ladoga, Russia

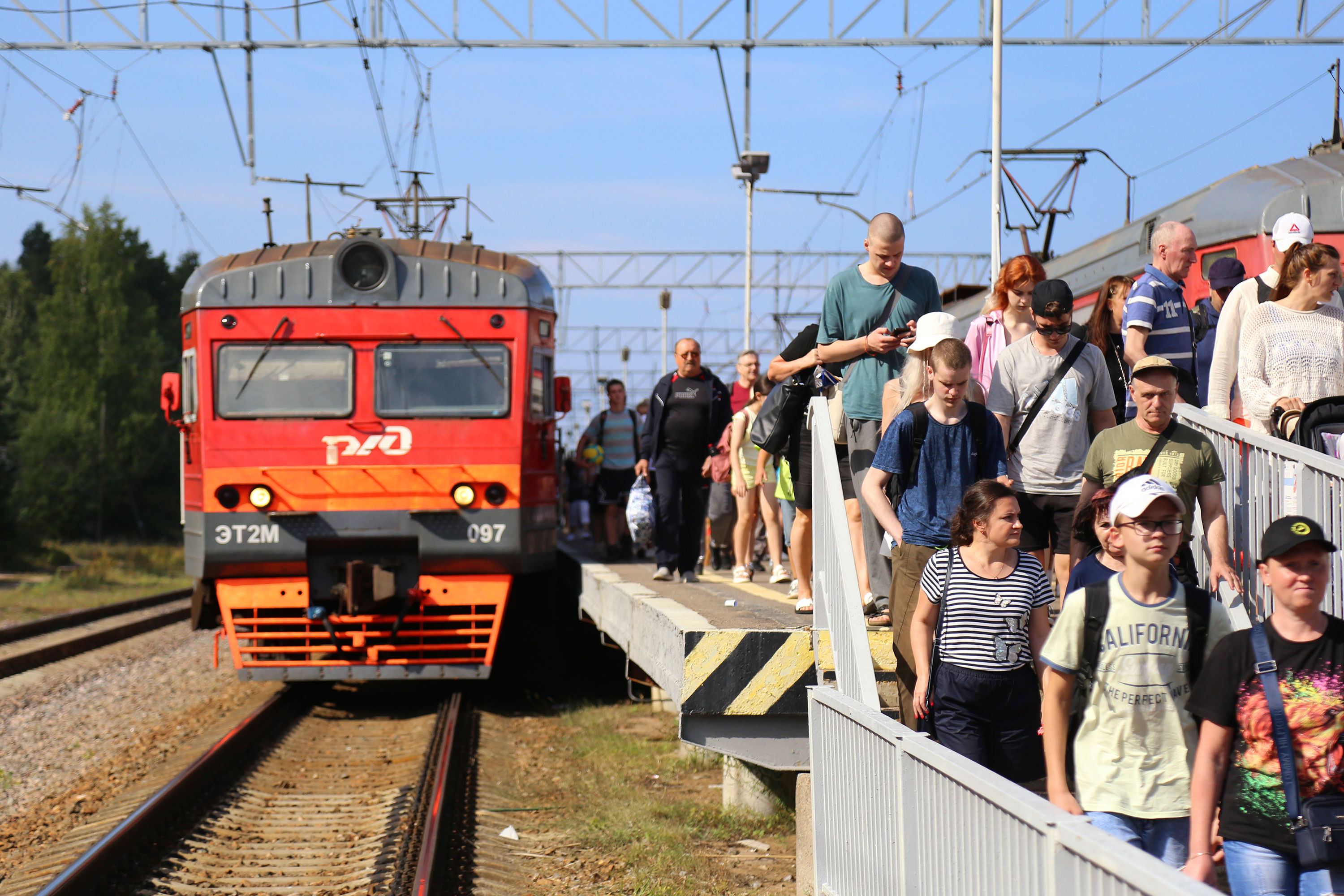
Lake Ladoga, Commuter Train, Russia

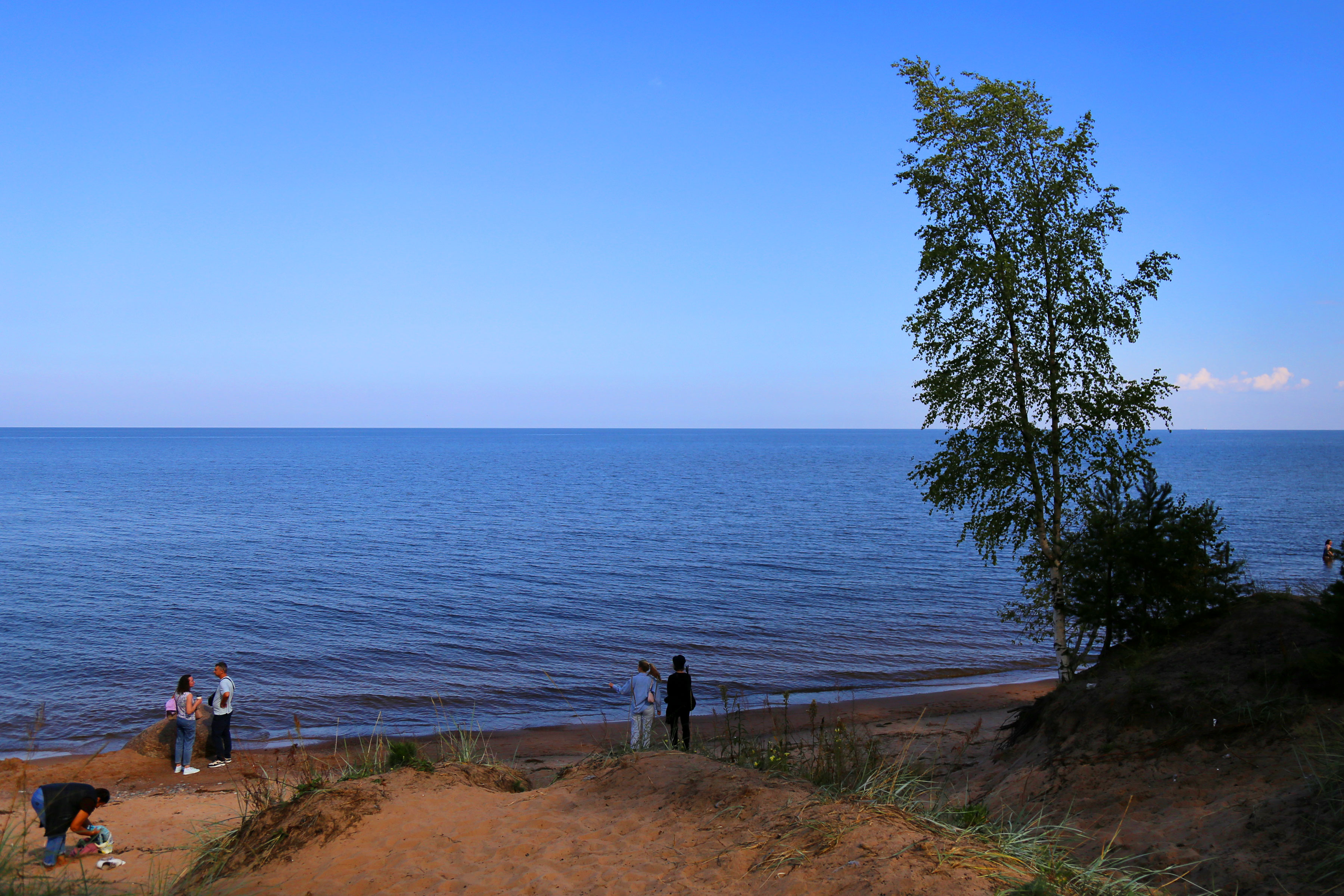
Lake Ladoga, Russia

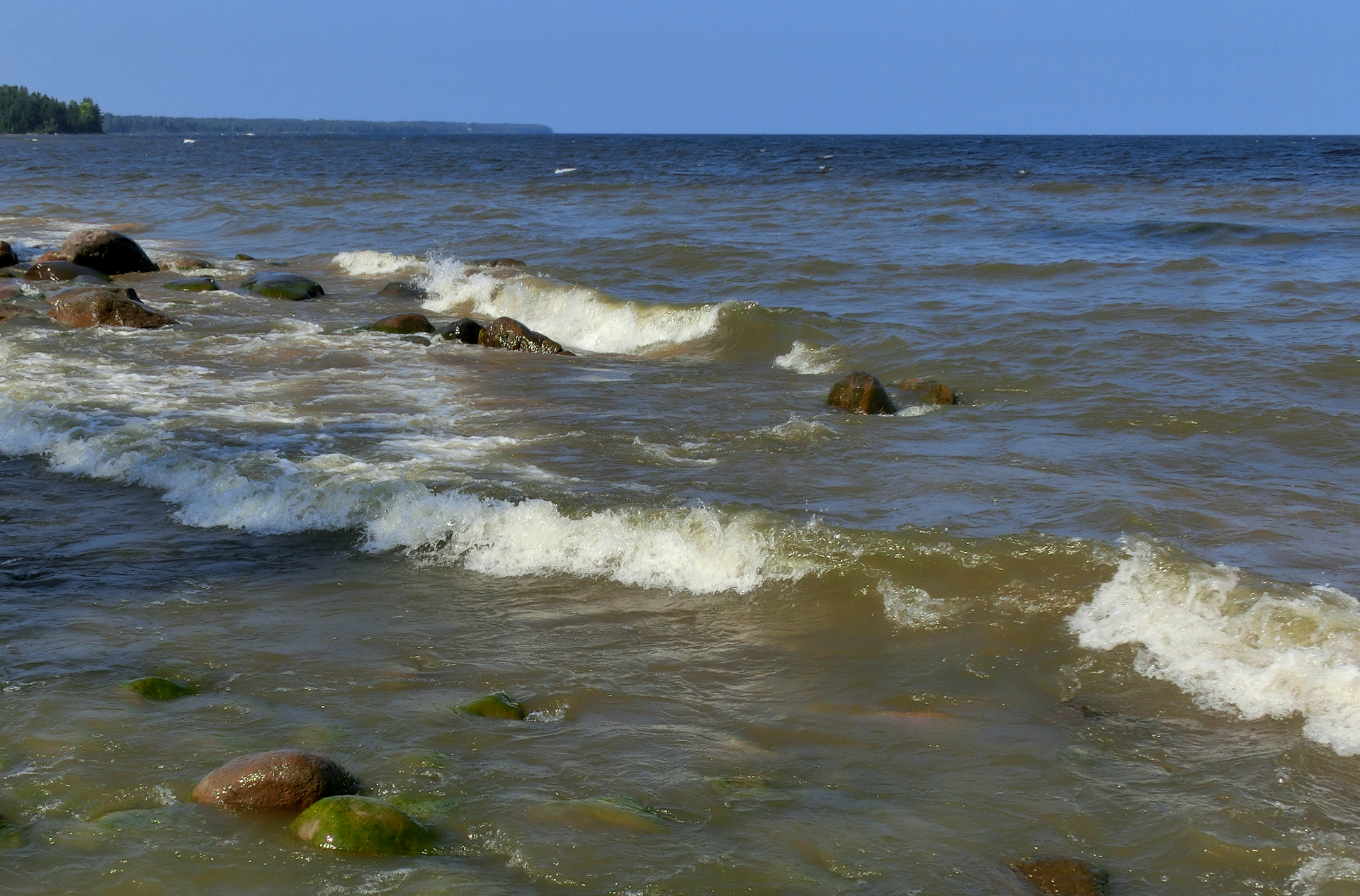
Lake Ladoga, Russia
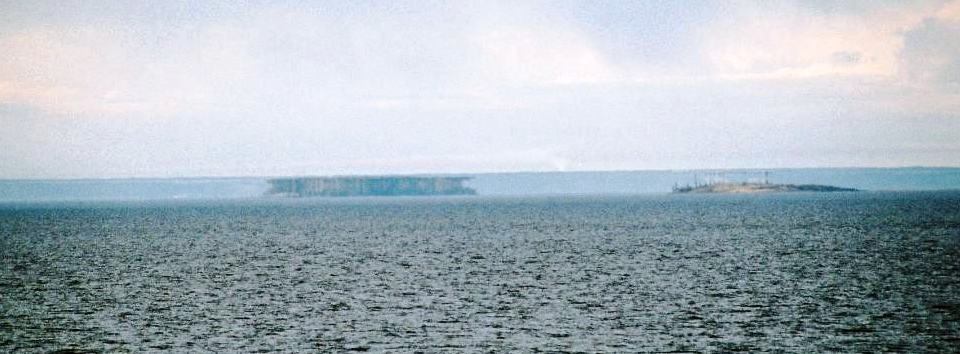
Superior mirage on Lake Ladoga

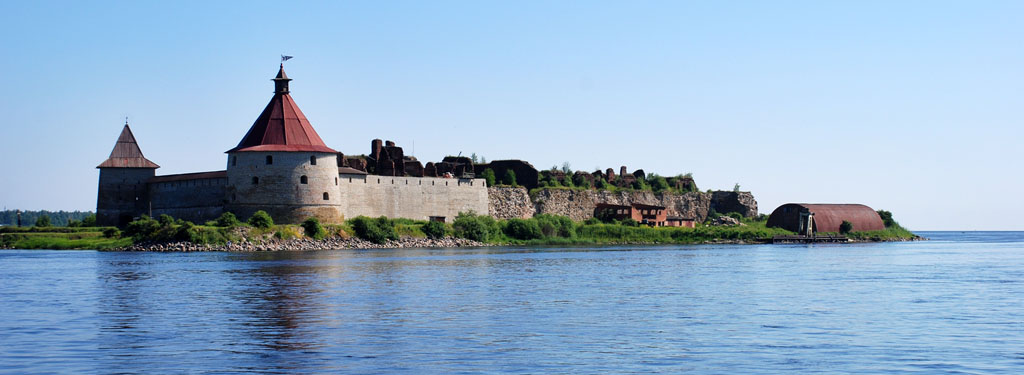
Oreshek Fortress on Ladoga shore in Shlisselburg
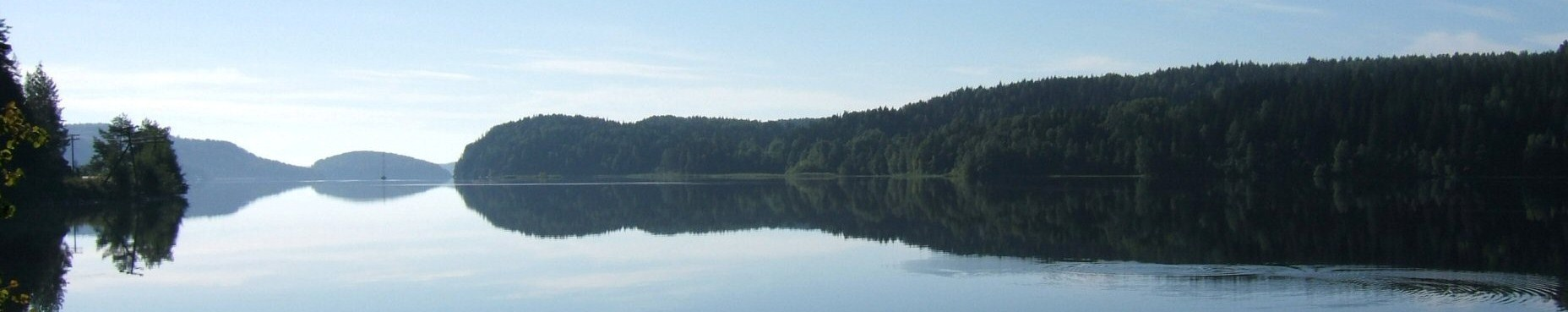
View
