= Morbyda =

German metal band

Morbyda is a German speed metal band. They have released one album, Under the Spell in 2025.

The band is based in Leipzig. The singer Mogli also plays in Indian Nightmare, guitarist Julez plays in Sintage.

Following a demo tape called Demo(n) Tape in 2023, their debut album Under the Spell came out in June 2025 through Dying Victims Productions. On the band's style, Metal Temple wrote that it resembled old school speed metal with a "blackened edge" while some songs also could have "rolled off the 80's NWOBHM press".

Dead Rhetoric scored the album as an 8 out of 10, almost matched by Metal.de and Heavymetal.dk with 7 out of 10. The former opined that Morbyda's subgenre had become saturated in recent years, and that Morbyda "certainly aren't reinventing the wheel either, yet they do stand out thanks to a certain degree of variety". The latter called Under the Spell "a debut solid as a hammer, but lacking the ultimate finesse to really pull victory home". Primarily, "the songwriting could plainly and simply be better". Metal Hammer Germany also gave a strong grade, 5.5 out of 7, also assessing that there was "just a little room for growth in the songwriting department".

Metalitalia.com felt the band image and album name were in danger of being worn out, but listening to the music, it did "incorporate something unexpected". However, Morbyda's attempt to exceed "three or four riffs" led to song structures that were "overly elaborate". This led to an overall grade of 6. The reviewer also criticized the band name for being "truly awful" and "horrendous". Norway's Scream Magazine only gave 3 out of 6, complaining that the material was "too thin", both in terms of the strength of the songwriting and regarding the sound quality.
