= VIII – The Time Unchained =

VIII - The Time Unchained

Studio album by Catamenia
- Released: October 24, 2008
- Recorded: 2008
- Studio: SoundMix Studio
- Genre: Melodic black metal
- Length: 61:12
- Label: Massacre
- Producer: Catamenia

Catamenia chronology
Location: COLD (2006)	VIII - The Time Unchained (2008)	Cavalcade (2010)

VIII – The Time Unchained is the eighth full-length album by the Finnish melodic black metal band Catamenia. It was released on October 24, 2008, through Massacre Records. It is the first album not to feature keyboards in any song.

== Reception ==
Though the band returned to its old cover art trope of wolves, and the cold, they managed to create a "winter storm concoction" that was pleasing to the reviewer, who graded it 9 out of 10. "The mix of black, death, and melodic thrash metal" had pagan and folk metal mixed in, as well as several types of vocals: "growls, clean singing, and shrieks". Powermetal.de concurred, calling it a "bullseye", an "outstanding new album", "the best album to date from these dark endurance athletes – and a true, minor masterpiece". Among the songs on the album were found "beautiful melodies and memorable choruses" as well as "anthems par excellence". The band emphasized melodies over complex song structures.

Rock Hard were lukewarm with their score of 6. Norway's Scream Magazine gave a 4 out of 6 score, with the reviewer stating that he was no fan of the band's output post-Halls of Frozen North, and had given up on "hoping for something big from this band". Nevertheless, VIII boasted a "fat sound, good presentation" and definitely had its audience. Another Norwegian magazine Exact only gave 3, stating that the band had "catchy riffs", but that the singer "does not sound very good" and the drums sounded "rather amateurish".

In Finland, Imperiumi gave a negative review, stating that Catamenia's discography was boring and this particular album was "really dull" and contained "glaring flaws". It even got no rating: "Due to the voiceovers found on the album, it gets a zero rating due to Imperium's general line. It goes without saying that it is a pretty insignificant album anyway. There are certainly more less bad albums even in the band's own discography".

== Track listing ==
1. "Garden of Thorns" – 5:48
2. "Alive...Cold...Dead!" – 4:17
3. "Tuhon Oma" – 4:44
4. "Dominion" – 6:17
5. "The Time Unchained" – 4:20
6. "Embody And Behold" – 3:50
7. "Fallen" – 4:50
8. "Uhrimalja" – 4:48
9. "Road of Bones" – 4:18
10. "The Last Day Before..." – 4:10
11. "From Out of Nowhere" (Faith No More cover) – 3:16
12. "Viivakoodit" (Apulanta cover) – 3:00^{*}
13. "Synti Voittaa" (Shitter Limited cover) – 7:34^{*}

^{*} Digipack only bonus tracks

== Personnel ==
- Riku Hopeakoski – lead guitar
- Ari Nissilä – vocals, rhythm guitar
- Toni Kansanoja – bass guitar, low grunts
- Kari Vähäkuopus – clean vocals
- Mikko Nevanlahti – drums
