= Catamenia (band) =

Finnish black metal band

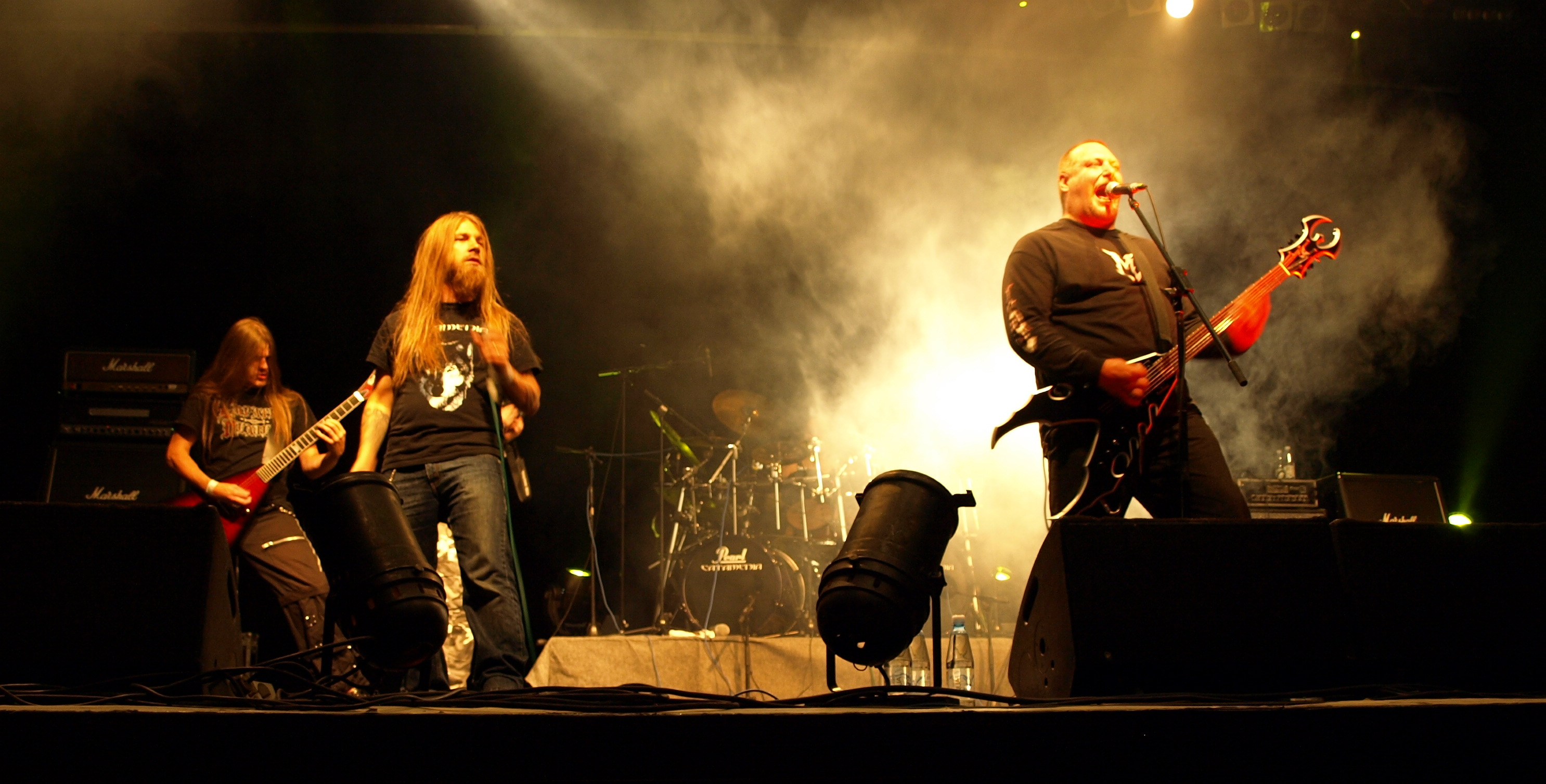
- Catamenia at Jalometalli 2008

Background information
- Origin: Oulu, Finland
- Genres: Melodic black metal, melodic death metal
- Years active: 1995–present (on hold from 2012–2025)
- Label: Massacre
- Members: Riku Hopeakoski; Juha-Matti Perttunen; Mikko Hepo-oja; Toni Qvick; Sauli Jauhiainen; Jussi Sauvola
- Past members: See: full listing
- Website: catamenia.net

Catamenia are a Finnish black metal band founded in 1995 by Riku Hopeakoski and Mika Tönning in Oulu. They have been signed to Massacre Records since their first full-length release, Halls of Frozen North, in 1998. As of 2012, they have released ten albums, one EP, and one DVD. They are known for using wolves in their album art. The band is named after a kind of bird. Catamenia also means "menstruation", which the band did not know until after the release of their debut album.

== History ==
They released their first demo album in their first active year, Demo '95. Their second demo, Winds, released in 1996, led to a four-album contract with Massacre Records in 1997. Their debut full-length album, Halls of Frozen North, was recorded in Commusication Studios, Beindersheim, Germany, in 1997, with Gerhard Magin (Crematory, Mystic Circle), and was released in 1998. A year later, they recorded their second album, Morning Crimson (1999), in Sweden, at Sunlight Studios with Thomas Skogsberg (Katatonia, Dismember). The band's third album, Eternal Winter's Prophecy, was recorded in their home country in 2000 at Tico-Tico Studios with Ahti Kortelainen (Kalmah, Eternal Tears of Sorrow, Dawn of Relic). Their last album for Massacre Records, Eskhata, was released in 2002, recorded in Oulu, Finland, at SoundMix Studios with producer Mika Pohjola (The Black League). After the release and promotion of Eskhata, Catamenia resigned with Massacre Records for three more albums, citing good working relations.

Catamenia faced line-up changes during the rehearsal for their fifth album, but their line-up steadied and were a six-piece for its release.

Catamenia recorded their fifth album, Chaos Born, at Neo Studio in Oulu, Finland, with Kari Vähäkuopus and Immu Ilmarinen (Burning Point, Embraze, Afterworld, Sentenced). ChaosBorn combines melody and aggressive metal. After praise from media and fans for ChaosBorn, Winternight Tragedies was stated as their sixth studio release, at Mastervox Studios with producers Kakke Vähäkuopus and Immu Ilmarinen.

While working on Winternight Tragedies, the band had problems with collaboration, distance, and lack of practice. As a result, vocalist Mika and bassist Timo were replaced with singer O.J. Mustonen and bassist Mikko Hepo-oja.

The album features raw, aggressive and angry songs with a melodious background.

In 2006, their seventh album, Location:COLD, was released. Later that year, the DVD Bringing the Cold to Poland was released, featuring live recordings at the Stodola Club in Warsaw, Poland.

Drummer Veikko Jumisko departed Catamenia in Spring 2007 because he was not able to tour anymore.

The US tour was postponed until 2008 because of promotion problems. A short Canadian tour called Brothers of Cold took place in May 2008.

In May 2008, Olli Mustonen left the band for undisclosed reasons. It is believed, since he missed the Canadian tour, he was deemed unreliable. Ari Nissilä took over lead vocals.

In December 2009, Catamenia started recording the album Cavalcade. It was released via Massacre Records on 26 February 2010.

In September 2010, Ari Nissilä, Toni Kansanoja, Mikko Nevanlahti and Kari Vähäkuopus left the band. In early October, bassist Mikko Hepo-oja, drummer Tony Qvick and guitarist Sauli Jauhiainen joined. Later on, the band added singer Juha-Matti Perttunen and keyboardist Jussi Sauvola.

Their most recent album, The Rewritten Chapters, was released on 27 April 2012. There was no known activity from the band until their Kaaos Festival 2025 performance on 25 July.

== Band members ==
=== Current ===
- Juha-Matti Perttunen – harsh vocals (2010–present)
- Riku Hopeakoski − lead guitar, backing vocals (1995–present), keyboards (2001–2002)
- Sauli Jauhiainen – rhythm guitar (2010–present)
- Mikko Hepo-oja – bass, backing vocals (2005–2006, 2010–present)
- Jussi Sauvola – keyboards (2011–present)
- Toni Qvick – drums, clean vocals (2010–present)

=== Former ===
- Ari Nissilä – guitar (2000–2010), harsh vocals (2008–2010), clean vocals (2002)
- Mikko Nevanlahti – drums (2008–2010)
- Toni Kansanoja – bass, low grunts (2006–2010)
- Kakke Vähäkuopus – clean vocals (2006–2010), rhythm guitar (2010)
- Olli-Jukka Mustonen − harsh vocals (2005–2008)
- Mika Tönning − harsh vocals (1995–2003)
- Sampo Ukkola − guitars (1997–1999)
- Timo Lehtinen − bass (1995–2003) (Kalmah)
- Heidi Riihinen − keyboards (1995–2000)
- Tero Nevala − keyboards, backing (2003–2006)
- Toni Tervo − drums (1995–1999)
- Kimmo 'Sir' Luttinen – drums (1999–2001) (The Black League, Impaled Nazarene)
- Veikko Jumisko − drums (2003–2007)
- Janne Kuzmin – drums (2001–2002)
- Pietu – drums (2002–2003)
- Mikko Nevanlahti - drums (2007–2010)

=== Guest and session musicians ===
- Antti Haapsamo − harsh vocals on Location: COLD
- Sir Luttinen − drums on Eternal Winter's Prophecy
- Janne Kusmin − drums on Eskhata

== Discography ==
=== Albums ===
- Halls of Frozen North (1998)
- Morning Crimson (1999)
- Eternal Winter's Prophecy (2000)
- Eskhata (2002)
- Chaos Born (2003)
- Winternight Tragedies (2005)
- Location: COLD (2006)
- VIII – The Time Unchained (2008)
- Cavalcade (2010)
- The Rewritten Chapters (2012)

=== Demos/EPs ===
- Demo '95 (1995)
- Winds (1996)
- Shape Edition (1999)

=== Compilations ===
- Massacre's Classix Shape Edition (1999)
- The Best of Catamenia (2013)

== Videography ==
- "Morning Crimson" (music video) (1999)
- "Kuolon Tanssi" (music video) (2003)
- "Tuhat Vuotta" (music video) (2006)
- Bringing the Cold to Poland (DVD) (2006)
- "Location: COLD" (music video) (2006)
- "Cavalcade" (music video) (2010)

== Cover songs ==
- "Fuel for Hatred" (Satyricon) − on Winternight Tragedies
- "I Wanna Be Somebody" (W.A.S.P.) − on Location: COLD
- "From Out of Nowhere" (Faith No More) – on VIII – The Time Unchained
- "Viivakoodit" (Apulanta) – on VIII – The Time Unchained
- "Synti Voittaa" (Shitter Limited) – on VIII – The Time Unchained
- "Angry Again" (Megadeth) – on Cavalcade
- "Farewell" (Sentenced) – on Cavalcade
- "Born to Be My Baby" (Bon Jovi) – on The Rewritten Chapters
