= Eternal Winter's Prophecy =

Studio album by Catamenia
- Released: August 21, 2000
- Recorded: 2000
- Studio: Tico Tico Studios, Finland
- Genre: Black metal, melodic black metal
- Length: 42:54
- Label: Massacre
- Producer: Catamenia

Catamenia chronology
Morning Crimson (1999)	Eternal Winter's Prophecy (2000)	Eskhata (2002)

Professional ratings
Review scores
Source	Rating
Metalfan.nl	80/100
Rock Hard	7.5/10

Eternal Winter's Prophecy is the third full-length album by Finnish black metal band Catamenia. The album was released on August 21, 2000, by Massacre Records.

== Track listing ==
1. "Gates of Anubis" − 3:06
2. "Soror Mystica" − 4:14
3. "Blackmension" − 3:49
4. "Kingdom of Legions" − 4:00
5. "Half Moons, Half Centuries" − 3:44
6. "Forever Night" − 2:50
7. "Dawn of the Chosen World" − 4:38
8. "Eternal Winter's Prophecy" − 3:26
9. "In the Void" − 4:53
10. "The Darkening Sun" − 4:51
11. "In the Capricorn's Cradle" − 3:23

== Credits ==
- Riku Hopeakoski − electric guitar, audio mixing
- Timo Lehtinen − bass guitar
- Gerard Magin − audio mixing
- Ari Nissilä − rhythm guitar
- Mika Tönning − vocals
- Sir Luttinen − drums

=== Production ===
- Recorded in 2000 Tico-Tico Studios, Finland, and engineered by Ahti Kortelainen
- Mixed in Commusication Studios, Germany, by Gerhard Magin and Riku Hopeakoski
- Cover artwork by Thomas Ewerhard
- Produced by Catamenia
