= Ensanguinate =

Slovenian death metal band

Ensanguinate is a Slovenian death metal band.

== Reception ==
Ensanguinate's first release was Entranced by Decay in 2020. Rock Hard called it a "strong old school death EP" and gave it 8 out of 10 points.

Rock Hard repeated this score when Ensanguinate put out their full-length debut, Eldritch Anatomy in 2022. Metal Hammer noted that the group was strongly rooted in 1980s extreme metal, but "doesn't blindly copy, but rather plays their own interpretation of thrashy death metal". With "sophisticated, transparent production", the Slovenians managed to "revive old death metal corpses with a sharp, life-giving infusion", being worthy of a 5 of 7 score. Norway's Scream Magazine gave 4 of 6, verging on 5, mainly due to a variation in arrangements and moods and "spicing of the mixture".

In February 2026, Ensanguinate released their second full-length Death Saturnalia (With Temples Below) on Soulseller. Metal.de called it an "underground gem" and a "must-have" for fans of several death metal bands. Ensanguinate did not reinvent the wheel, but that was not "the point in 2026", and the band set themselves apart due to their "cleverness in their songwriting". The reviewer also praised the "recognizably handcrafted" cover art by Dávid Glomba: "This is what occult-tinged death metal should look like". Again, the score was 8 both here and in Powermetal.de, with the latter using strong adjectives such as "extreme material at its finest". The reviewer docked points as the band was not quite able to "maintain this high standard throughout". There was "a slight lull in the middle", but had this part also been up to the standard of the rest, Death Saturnalia "would undoubtedly have crossed the finish line as a masterpiece".

== Discography ==
- Entranced by Decay (demo, 2020)
- Eldritch Anatomy (2022)
- Death Saturnalia (With Temples Below) (2026)
