= Eskhata =

Studio album by Catamenia
- Released: April 29, 2002
- Recorded: 2001
- Studio: SoundMix Studio, Oulu, Finland
- Genre: Melodic black metal, melodic death metal
- Length: 46:51
- Label: Massacre
- Producer: Catamenia; Mika Pohjola

Catamenia chronology
Eternal Winter's Prophecy (2000)	Eskhata (2002)	Chaos Born (2003)

Eskhata is the fourth full-length album by the Finnish melodic black metal band Catamenia. The album was released on April 29, 2002, by Massacre Records and was distributed by Sony.

== Reception ==
Rock Hard published two reviews of the album in issue #181, one rating it at only 4 out of 10 and the other 8. Metal.de was closer to the latter with its 7/10 rating. While the album was above average all in all, when broken down it consisted of "seven solid tracks" and merely "three above-average songs". Metal.de's reviewer also recommended that the band find another studio than SoundMix in Oulu. Similarly to Metal.de, Powermetal.de criticized the production: "The drums sound muddy, lifeless, and lacking in punch, ruining the otherwise good sound of the vocals and the other instruments". The album lacked more than "a few good songs", being filled with "a lot of decent average tracks", and the reviewer recommended not to buy it but rather leave it on the shelf.

In Finland, Imperiumi found Eskhata "worth exploring", but it had its weaknesses, and the predecessor album Eternal Winter's Prophecy "sounds like a more fluid whole". The score was again 7 out of 10. The same score was also bestowed upon the album by Chronicles of Chaos.

== Track listing ==
1. "Storm" − 4:19
2. "Rain of Blood" − 4:31
3. "Flames" − 5:20
4. "Vortex" − 5:51
5. "Coexistence Circle" − 4:26
6. "Landscape" − 3:39
7. "Karma" − 0:57
8. "Astral Tears" − 5:11
9. "Time in My Hands" − 3:28
10. "Beyond the Starlight" − 3:29
11. "Eskhata" − 5:40

== Credits ==
=== Band members ===
- Mika Tönning − vocals
- Riku Hopeakoski − lead guitar, keyboards
- Ari Nissilä − rhythm guitar, clean vocals
- Timo Lehtinen − bass guitar
- Janne Kusmin − drums

=== Production ===
- Produced, mixed and mastered by Catamenia and Mika Pohjola at SoundMix Studio, Oulu
- Along with producing the album, Mika Pohjola contributed extra keyboards
- Thomas Ewerhard − layout design, cover art
- Mika Vuoto − photography
