= Location: COLD =

Studio album by Catamenia
- Released: August 25, 2006
- Recorded: 2006
- Studios: Mastervox Studios, Oulu, Finland
- Genre: Melodic black metal
- Length: 47:10
- Label: Massacre
- Producers: Kakke Vähäkuopus; Immu Ilmarinen; Catamenia

Catamenia chronology
| Winternight Tragedies (2005) | Location: COLD (2006) | VIII – The Time Unchained (2008) |

Location: COLD is the seventh full-length album by the Finnish melodic black metal band, Catamenia. Making guest appearances on the album are Kakke Vähäkuopus, providing clean vocals, and Antti Haapsamo, providing additional vocals on tracks 2, 3, 5, 6, 7 and 8. Music videos were made for the songs, "Location:COLD", "The Day When the Sun Faded Away" and the video for "Tuhat Vuotta" was recorded in their studio. The album features "I Wanna Be Somebody", a cover version of the song by heavy metal band W.A.S.P.

== Reception ==
The album received scores of 7 out of 10 from Metal.de and 8 from Rock Hard. Vampster gave a very positive review, stating that Catamenia were "full of energy and deliver an album packed with groovy, melodic songs that show no weaknesses". There was not "a single weak moment throughout", making Location: COLD "a fantastic album that's destined for heavy rotation".

Norway's Scream Magazine gave a rating of 4 out of 6, stating that while the band lacked a distinct identity, the songwriting was rather good. Ricarda Schwoebel of Powermetal.de called the album "pretty good", warranting several spins in the CD player.

In Finland, Imperiumi gave a 5 out of 10 score, stating that the album "suffers from three cardinal sins". There did not "seem to be anything in the songs that hasn't already been heard a million times and, frankly, done much more interestingly". The sound was furthermore on "the demo level" and could be called "somewhat sloppy at best".

== Track listing ==
- All music and lyrics by Catamenia except "I Wanna Be Somebody" by W.A.S.P.
1. "Tribe of Eternity" − 5:20
2. "Gallery of Fear" − 4:37
3. "Coldbound" − 5:16
4. "Tuhat Vuotta" − 4:15
5. "Closed Gates of Hope" − 4:34
6. "Zero Gravity" − 4:40
7. "Location: COLD" − 5:32
8. "The Day When the Sun Faded Away" − 5:17
9. "Expect No Mercy" − 4:28
10. "I Wanna Be Somebody" − 3:11 (W.A.S.P. cover)

== Credits ==
=== Band members ===
- Riku Hopeakoski − lead guitar, backing vocals
- Ari Nissilä − rhythm guitar, backing vocals
- Olli Mustonen − vocals
- Veikko Jumisko − drums
- Tero Nevala − keyboards, backing vocals
- Toni Kansanoja − bass guitar, backing vocals
- Kari "Kakke" Vähäkuopus − clean vocals

=== Guest musicians ===
- Antti "Hape" Haapsamo − additional vocals on tracks 2, 3, 5, 6, 7 and 8

=== Production ===
- Recorded, mixed and mastered at Mastervox Studios, Oulu, Finland, by Kakke Vähäkuopus and Immu Ilmarinen
- Produced by Kakke Vähäkuopus, Immu Ilmarinen and Catamenia
- Cover artwork by Anthony Clarkson
- Band photos by Ode Porkola
