= Morning Crimson =

Studio album by Catamenia
- Released: June 7, 1999
- Recorded: January 1999
- Studio: Sunlight Studios, Stockholm, Sweden
- Genre: Black metal, melodic black metal
- Length: 40:48
- Label: Massacre
- Producer: Tomas Skogsberg

Catamenia chronology
| Halls of Frozen North (1998) | Morning Crimson (1999) | Eternal Winter's Prophecy (2000) |

Professional ratings
Review scores
| Source | Rating |
|---|---|
| Metal.de | 10/10 |
| Rock Hard | 6/10 |

Morning Crimson is the second full-length album by Finnish black metal band Catamenia. The album was produced by Tomas Skogsberg. The cover art was placed in Invisible Oranges' "Top 20 Old School Black Metal Photoslop Album Covers (1990-2005)".

== Track listing ==
1. "Aurora Borealis" − 3:15
2. "Talviyön varjot" − 2:40
3. "...And Winter Descends" − 3:16
4. "In Blood They Lay" − 3:17
5. "Beauty Embraced by the Night" − 3:02
6. "Passing Moment of Twilight Time" − 2:46
7. "Cast the Stars Beyond" − 3:42
8. "Morning Crimson" − 3:38
9. "The Forests of Tomorrow" − 3:21
10. "Towards the Winds of Winter (Shores of Sendar)" − 3:01
11. "When the Frost Took the Lakes" − 3:40
12. "Shadeweaver's Season" − 3:06
13. "Winternacht" − 2:04

== Credits ==
=== Band members ===
- Mika Tönning − vocals
- Riku Hopeakoski − guitars
- Sampo Ukkola − guitars
- Timo Lehtinen − bass guitar
- Toni Tervo − drums
- Heidi Riihinen − keyboards

=== Production ===
- Recorded and mixed in January 1999 at Sunlight Studios, Stockholm, Sweden, by Tomas Skogsberg and Jocke Petterson.
- Produced by Tomas Skogsberg
- Mastered by Alex Krull at Master Sound
