= Proxillian =

German power metal band

Proxillian was a German melodic power metal band from Wolfenbüttel. The band issued two albums.

The debut album was 2015's But Sorrow Remains. Rock Hard gave a mediocre score, 5.5 out of 10. Norway's Scream Magazine gave the lowest grade, 1 out of 6. The music was "just atrocious", complained the reviewer, adding that the "vocals are sourer than the full quantity of lemons in the world". The music contained "NOTHING exciting" and had been "done better by hundreds of Brazilian Helloween/Stratovarius copies in the late nineties".

Ahead of their sophomore album Redemption in 2018, Proxillian published a lyric video for "Candleflame". Eventually, Rock Hard rated this album somewhat better, 6 out of 10. Powermetal.de first and foremost commented the stylistic variation on Redemption. While there was not "a single bad minute on Redemption, and only a few sections of mediocre music", the reviewer could not "quite warm to the album" and recommended a more "unique sound" and "individuality". The vocalist should also narrow down his style, as he presently sounded "a bit like NWOBHM, a bit like Depeche Mode, and a bit like modern metal". Musically, Proxillian showed inspirations from specific bands and employed "very different styles" throughout the album. Proxillian even strayed from metal, showing a "distinct pop slant" on "Craving" and taking "a surprisingly poppy turn" on "Street of Broken Hearts".

Having existed since 2012, Proxillian split in 2021.
