= Endonomos =

American power metal band

Endonomos is an Austrian doom metal band. The band has released two albums on Italian label Argonauta Records.

== Reception ==
Their first full-length was 2022's Endonomos, released on Italian label Argonauta Records. Norway's Scream Magazine graded it 5 out of 6, giving it praise for being "heavy as lead", melodic, "nothing short of beautiful" and "balsam to the ear". Rock Hard landed on a 7, whereas Metal.de was somewhat lower with only 6. On the good side, "Endonomos skillfully weave together elements of classic doom metal in their multifaceted sound, spicing it all up with powerful death-doom elements". On the other hand, Endonomos lacked "their own unique touch"; "the influences are too obvious" and the vocals "lack originality".

Metal.de improved their rating for the sophomore album Endonomos II – Enlightenment, upgrading to 8 as the songwriter had now taken a "significantly more mature and focused approach", had been "refined with greater sensitivity and nuance", showed "greater determination" and a clearer "vision of doom death metal". While the influences were still "clearly audible", it had "distinct character" and blended doom and death metal "in a unique way". It was a "mature work that captivates throughout, lulling the listener with gentle passages, teasing them with dissonances, and crushing them with its powerful depths"—and was "thoroughly enjoyable" and "indispensable" for genre fans. Powermetal.de opined that "the riffing sounds truly powerful" and the overall sound was good, with a "very well balanced" mix. The reviewer however found the songwriting too stretched out, failing to maintain "a consistently high level of intensity". With "little perceptible variation", the records became tedious with "recurring lulls that even the sometimes deep growls and the actual death metal bursts can't mask". The rating was only 6.5 out of 10. Inferno.fi gave 3.5 out of 5.
