= Halls of Frozen North =

Studio album by Catamenia
- Released: January 20, 1998
- Recorded: September 1997
- Studios: Commusication Studios, Beindersheim, Germany
- Genres: Black metal, heavy metal
- Length: 46:33
- Label: Massacre
- Producers: Gerhard Magin; Catamenia

Catamenia chronology
Winds (1996)	Halls of Frozen North (1998)	Morning Crimson (1999)

Professional ratings
Review scores
Source	Rating
Metal.de	6/10
Rock Hard	7.5/10
Scream Magazine	4/6

Halls of Frozen North is the first album by the Finnish black metal band Catamenia. It was released on January 20, 1998, by Massacre Records.

== Track listing ==
- All music and lyrics by Catamenia.
1. "Dreams of Winterland" − 3:30
2. "Into Infernal" − 3:37
3. "Freezing Winds of North" − 3:36
4. "Enchanting Woods" − 3:38
5. "Halls of Frozen North" − 3:06
6. "Forest Enthroned" − 3:49
7. "Awake in Dark" − 2:51
8. "Song of the Nightbird" − 3:40
9. "Icy Tears of Eternity" − 3:04
10. "Burning Aura" − 3:36
11. "Child of Sunset" − 2:36
12. "Land of the Autumn Winds" − 3:50
13. "Pimeä yö" − 4:19
14. "Outro" − 1:21

== Credits ==
=== Band members ===
- Mika Tönning − vocals
- Riku Hopeakoski − guitars
- Sampo Ukkola − guitars
- Timo Lehtinen − bass guitar
- Toni Tervo − drums
- Heidi Riihinen − keyboards

=== Production ===
- Produced by Gerhard Magin and Catamenia
- Mastered by Alex Krull at Master Sound
