= Todesstoß =

Todesstoß ("Death Blow") is a German experimental black metal project.

The project is run by Martin Lang from München. The music is rooted in black metal, having also been described as ambient black metal, avant-garde or atmospheric black metal

Todesstoß reached the metal press after releasing Hirngemeer in 2013. Norway's Scream Magazine gave the album their lowest grade, 1 out of 6. Among others, the use of a harmonica gave the feeling that Todesstoss tried to sound unique, which they did, but in a forced manner. The reviewer regarded this as art for art's sake, and "definitely not" as good music. Powermetal.de headlined the album as "extremely experimental", needing many listens to grasp. "Dark, psychedelic lyrics are croaked, screamed, and whispered with such intensity that it's literally painful. The result is presented in a dark and hazy production". The music offered "no enjoyment whatsoever" and "may lead to pain, confusion, and disorientation" in listeners who weren't acquainted with the genre. Exclaim! described Hirngemeer as "an acquired taste that only really appeals to those who like weird and experimental black metal". The reviewer found Todesstoß to be hitting the mark as a successful experimental piece.

Ebne Graun was released in February 2017 on I, Voidhanger Records. The album consisted of a singular track of more than 45 minutes' length. Rock Hard lambasted the album, giving it the lowest score of 1. The album failed to be avant-garde, instead falling into the category of "utter nonsense". "The album is just as unlistenable as the entire output of this Munich-based artist, who churns out his sometimes downright dilettantish creations with alarming speed and would probably have been better off as a poet than a musician". Metal.de opined that previous albums were more rewarding, with Ebne Graun having shortcomings in composition and technical aspects. The rating was 4 out of 10. Powermetal.de similarly gave a 4.5 rating. Todesstoß failed in creating a coherent, flowing piece; the "monotonous guitar work eventually becomes simply grating and completely misses its hypnotic mark".
