= 12 Gauge (Kalmah album) =

Studio album by Kalmah
- Released: 3 March 2010
- Recorded: June–August 2009
- Studio: Tico-Tico Studios, Finland
- Genre: Melodic death metal, thrash metal, black metal
- Length: 42:58
- Label: Spinefarm
- Producer: Kalmah

Kalmah chronology
For the Revolution (2008)	12 Gauge (2010)	Seventh Swamphony (2013)

12 Gauge is the sixth studio album by the Finnish melodic death metal band Kalmah, released on 3 March 2010. It adds more thrash metal to the melodic death metal sound that the band is known for alongside the usual environmental themes regarding the swamps of Finland. 12 Gauge was recorded in three sessions over a three-month period at Tico-Tico Studios in Finland.

Each of the band members kept in touch with their fans by keeping track of their recording sessions online at the official website's studio diary. In addition, guitarist Antti Kokko videotaped the recording and photo shoot sessions. Seven videos were posted online during the months leading up to the album's release. Promotion for the album was otherwise minimal. There were no official singles, but the track "Bullets Are Blind" was released on a 2-CD compilation included with Soundi magazine's 35th anniversary issue, and a music video to the album's title track was produced and posted online.

12 Gauge received generally favorable reviews by European and American critics, with a few considering it better than either of its immediate predecessors, For the Revolution and The Black Waltz. It was agreed that the band succeeded in producing a thrashier album, but most critics found the music to be less sophisticated than the band's previous efforts. 12 Gauge charted in two countries, peaking at number 32 in Canada and number 15 in the band's homeland. Because the band had not been offered a worldwide tour, support for the album would be limited to Europe and Canada.

== Background ==
When Kalmah began writing music for their sixth album, their intent was to incorporate more "aggressive thrash material" than their previous recordings had. As a result, the songs were going to be, as vocalist Pekka Kokko described, "quite straightforward", but the band did not want to lose the melodies they were known for. The album would not be entirely thrash metal, since the band planned on adding acoustic guitar sections and also trumpets. Antti Kokko, the primary songwriter for 12 Gauge, composed the riffs and melodies at his home. These ideas were developed into complete songs during rehearsals. Guitar and keyboard solos were then written, sometimes with both instruments soloing in the same song, trading off repeatedly. Two of the tracks, "Godeye" and "Sacramentum", were composed entirely by keyboardist Marco Sneck, including the solos.

Pekka wrote all the lyrics on the album. Several of the songs shared an environmental theme. "Hook the Monster" was about fishing, "12 Gauge" was inspired by hunting, and the impact of land development in the swamps of Finland was the subject of "Swampwar". Commenting further on the swamps, Pekka remarked, "[those] valuable areas are a part of our northern wilderness and [are] always threatened to be ditched or drained. People are interested in those areas [to use] as a source of energy."

== Production ==
Recording and mixing took place at Tico-Tico Studios in Kemi, Finland. The studio's schedule was too full for a single recording session, so Kalmah had to book time to record the album in three separate sessions, between the months of May and August 2009. The majority of tracks were recorded in May, beginning with Janne Kusmin's drums, which were completed by 12 May. Kusmin was not able to play as well as he had hoped because he had not been practicing. As a result, several of his drum parts were changed.

By the following week, Timo Lehtinen had finished laying down the bass tracks. His technique was to play nearly all his parts with downstrokes to bring "more balls to the sound". He continued recording even after his thumb had formed a blister. According to Lehtinen, he used only two bass string sets and broke five picks.

"Sacramentum" (2010)
The rhythm guitars in this clip are played with a quick succession of downstrokes only, which the band referred to as "jynkhä".

Pekka and Antti took turns recording their rhythm and lead guitar parts, respectively. Both guitarists played by striking the guitar strings at a 45-degree angle to achieve a more aggressive sound. Several of the guitar techniques used on the album had specific names: "Jynkhä" described the rapid succession of downstrokes, and a slower version of this technique was called "perusjynkhä." Speed-picking with alternating upstrokes and downstrokes was referred to as "hionta", Finnish for grinding. Some of the techniques used were difficult for Pekka, and his brother Antti took the time to show him proper fingering and grasps. The acoustic guitars were played by Antti. All the guitar tracks, excluding the solos, were finished by 28 May.

By the middle of June, Pekka had recorded vocals for five tracks, which Antti described as "very raw ... the way we want them to be". Pekka's vocals would continue to be recorded in August, and he completed them on 20 August. Antti had also completed his guitar solos by June and was pleased with the results. "For me, the solos are [the] best that I have ever managed to create, and I'm very satisfied." After a summer break, the band returned to record Sneck's keyboards, which took place over three days, 17–19 August. Sneck worked with software effects for the first time, along with sound modules. He introduced synthesized horns to the band's instrumentation, but an actual trumpet was used for the intro to "Rust Never Sleeps".

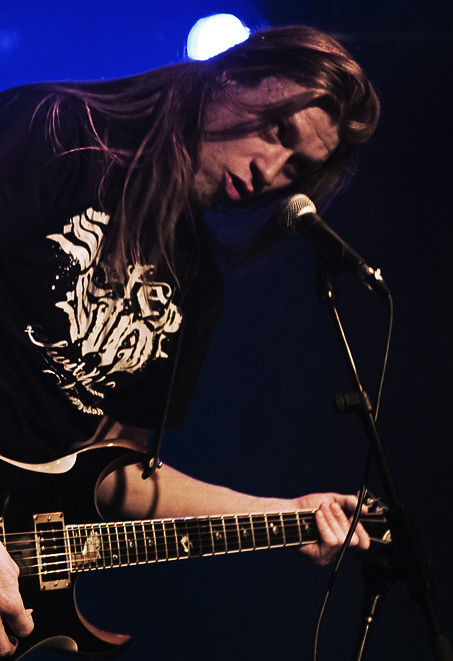
Pekka Kokko performing in Helsinki, Finland on 6 March 2010.

Although the band produced the album, Pekka stated that Antti was the main producer. Because they were comfortable self-producing on all their previous albums, they refused to bring in an outside record producer for 12 Gauge. "This concept has worked for us since the beginning and we just want to trust it. Everything goes easy with this setup and we don't want any extra risk factors". Mastering for the disc took place at the Cutting Room in Stockholm, Sweden.

The title of the album was chosen by Pekka and Antti, who both enjoy hunting. They wanted to draw a comparison between the shotgun shells and the music. Pekka added that the title also alludes to "unpleasant matters" that the listener can infer from his lyrics. When it came time to design the album cover, the band decided against using computer-generated graphics. They commissioned Rami Mursula to create a hand-drawn piece of artwork, depicting a man emerging from the swamp to fight a beast. Pekka explained the symbolism: "In Kalmah's mindset, there is Swamplord defending his marshlands against [the] monster created by common materialism, industrial pollution and [the] world-wide nausea of globalism." The layout was inspired by Akseli Gallen-Kallela's 1896 painting, The Defense of the Sampo.

== Promotion ==
Images used in the album artwork were photographed by Vesa Ranta at one of Finland's many swamps. The photo session was documented by Antti in a two-part video, titled "The Call of the Wild." These, and five other short videos documenting the recording of 12 Gauge, were uploaded in the months leading up to the album's release.

There was no official single, but in December 2009, the track "Bullets Are Blind" was included on a 2-CD collection released as a companion to the 35th anniversary issue of Soundi magazine, and a music video was shot and posted online for the track "12 Gauge". In February 2010, Kalmah launched a second MySpace page solely dedicated to the new album. The album was released on CD and download in Japan in February, followed by releases in Canada and Europe in March, and in the US in April. A vinyl pressing was also made available in April, limited to 500 copies.

The band played shows in support of the album in their native Finland, as well as Germany and Slovenia. The 4 March performance in Jyväskylä, Finland, was considered to be the album's release party. The band then traveled to Canada for a 10-show tour.

== Critical reception ==
Professional ratings
Review scores
Source	Rating
AllMusic	3.5/5 stars
Blistering	8/10
Imperiumi.net	8+/10
MetalEater	B+
NecroWeb	10/10
PopMatters	8/10
Soundi	4/5
Stalker	8.5/10

Allmusic's Eduardo Rivadavia said Kalmah's sixth album was "more aggressive than its immediate predecessors". David E. Gehlke of Blistering was already devoted to Kalmah's previous album, For the Revolution, so he had high expectations for 12 Gauge. He found the album full of "break-neck riff action", "visceral melodies", and "daring" dueling between Antti's guitar and Sneck's keyboard. Although Gehlke believed that Kalmah gets better with each output, he decided that 12 Gauge did not "match the ... glory" of For the Revolution.

Jussi Kallinen of Imperiumi.net said that Pekka's vocals harkened back to the band's 2006 album, The Black Waltz. He said the album was not anything new, but he found the production to be the best of Kalmah's releases. MetalEater's Sean Bester decided Kalmah's strength lay in their consistency: "releasing energetic and melodic music with consistent intervals of time between them, delivering tracks that are consistently likable, and each one is consistent with the sound they've firmly established for themselves." NecroWeb gave the album a perfect score, because it was "beautifully arranged", "wonderfully varied", did not contain any filler material, and it succeeded at combining melodic thrash with black metal and death metal.

Chris Colgan, writing for PopMatters, found the album to have the longest and most intricate solos yet, and he, too, mentioned the increased trading off between Antti's and Sneck's solos. He thought it important that Kalmah had "not fallen prey to the tendency of introducing American metal elements or becoming more mainstream with their sound. Their music now is as unique as it was in their early years, if not more so". Marko Säynekoski of Soundi described the performances as "controlled", "burly", and "performed effortlessly". Stalker's Kathleen Gransalke admitted that she was unfamiliar with Kalmah's previous work, but she was nevertheless impressed with its technicality, double-guitar melodies, fast solos, and the combining of genres. She called the album "a lot of fun to listen to".

== "12 Gauge" music video ==
Pekka Kokko singing. Camera effects simulated the influences of a mysterious drink.

A music video was created for the song "12 Gauge", though the acoustic intro was excised from the final version. It was shot on 20 February 2010 in Pudasjärvi, Finland, in some of the coldest temperatures the country had had in decades. The morning temperature when the band began filming was recorded at −37 °C (−35 °F), rising only to −27 °C (−17 °F) at the end of the day. The band and camera operator were kept warm by a bonfire, though Antti said that they were used to cold temperatures.

The video, which debuted online on 1 March was produced by the record label, Spinefarm, and Kalmah. The camera and Steadicam operator was Markus Lintu, and Kalmah's bassist, Timo Lehtinen, edited and color-timed the final product.

The video cuts between two narratives. In the first, a hunter (uncredited actor) straps a 16-gauge shotgun around his shoulder, and tracks footsteps through the snow, eventually finding the Swamplord (the band's mascot, here as depicted on the covers of The Black Waltz and For the Revolution). In the second narrative, the band members, dressed warmly in heavy clothing, are sitting around a campfire, preparing a kettle of an unknown drink. As each person takes a sip, they begin convulsing. To simulate the drink's effects, the camera used shaking and rapid zooming. As the song finishes, Pekka pours himself a drink and is the only one immune to its effects.

== Track listing ==
All lyrics are written by Pekka Kokko.

No.	Title	Music	Length
1.	"Rust Never Sleeps"	Antti Kokko	5:16
2.	"One of Fail"	A. Kokko	4:10
3.	"Bullets Are Blind"	A. Kokko	4:27
4.	"Swampwar"	A. Kokko, Pekka Kokko, Timo Lehtinen	4:19
5.	"Better Not to Tell"	A. Kokko	3:58
6.	"Hook the Monster"	P. Kokko	4:04
7.	"Godeye"	Marco Sneck	4:25
8.	"12 Gauge"	A. Kokko	5:50
9.	"Sacramentum"	Sneck	6:27

Japanese edition bonus track
No.	Title	Writer(s)	Length
10.	"Cold Sweat" (Thin Lizzy cover)	John Sykes, Phil Lynott	3:10

== Personnel ==
Band

- Pekka Kokko − vocals, rhythm guitars, lead guitar
- Antti Kokko − lead guitar
- Marco Sneck − keyboards
- Janne "Kuisma" Kusmin − drums
- Timo "Lede" Lehtinen − bass

Production

- Håkan Åkesson – mastering
- Kalmah – arranger, producer
- Ahti Kortelainen – engineer, mixing
- Rami Mursula – cover art, layout
- Vesa Ranta – photography
- Joona Lukala – LP mastering
- The Official Kalmah Pig Unit – chorus
- J-P Peltoniemi – trumpet on "Rust Never Sleeps"

== Charts ==
Chart (2010)	Peak position
Canadian Albums Chart	32
Finnish Albums Chart	15

== Release history ==
Region	Date	Label	Format
Canada	2 March 2010	Spinefarm	CD
Europe	3 March 2010	Spinefarm	CD, vinyl
Japan	24 February 2010	King	CD
United States	6 April 2010	Fontana Universal	CD
