= Winternight Tragedies =

Studio album by Catamenia
- Released: April 25, 2005
- Studio: Mastervox Studios
- Genres: Melodic black metal, melodic death metal
- Length: 47:26
- Label: Massacre
- Producers: Kakke Vähäkuopus; Immu Ilmarinen; Catamenia

Catamenia chronology
| Chaos Born (2003) | Winternight Tragedies (2005) | Location: COLD (2006) |

Winternight Tragedies is the sixth full-length album by Finnish melodic black metal band, Catamenia. It was released on April 25, 2005, through Massacre Records.

Fuel for Hatred is a cover of a Satyricon song from their album Volcano.

== Reception ==
Norway's Scream Magazine gave a rating of 3 out of 6, complaining that nothing was new since the debut album, the album cover featured a wolf just like before, the music was predictable and the production "flat and calculating". Rock Hard was similarly reserved with 6.5 of 10. Noise.fi gave 3 of 5. On the positive side, the band conjured up "a number of catchy melodies" so that "fans of the band would be pleased".

Powermetal.de disagreed that Catamenia lacked progress over the course of their career. Catamenia "no longer have much in common with the spirit of black metal", and had for instance drifted "towards Viking metal". The track "Verikansa" was "a small masterpiece" and a suitable "Viking national anthem". The melodic black metal they still did play was "second to none", and the Satyricon cover was "masterfully accomplished". Metal.de was similarly exalted, handing out 9 of 10 points. Winternight Tragedies was a "solid piece" with "richness", "catchy melodies that really stick in your head"—surpassing their previous releases. Heavymetal.dk gave the same score.

== Track listing ==
1. "The Heart of Darkness" – 5:03
2. "Verikansa" – 4:53
3. "Strength and Honor" – 5:07
4. "The Crystal Stream" – 3:54
5. "Kaamos Warrior" – 3:53
6. "My Blood Stained Path" – 4:54
7. "Perintö Pohjolan" – 5:00
8. "Iced Over" – 5:24
9. "The Ancient" – 5:46
10. "Fuel for Hatred" – 3:32 (Satyricon cover)

== Personnel ==
=== Catamenia ===
- O.J. Mustonen – vocals
- Riku Hopeakoski – lead guitar
- Ari Nissilä – rhythm guitar, backing vocals
- Veikko Jumisko – drums
- Mikko Hepo-oja – bass guitar
- Kakke Vähäkuopus – clean male vocals

=== Additional musicians ===
- Tero Nevala – keyboards
- Heidi Sainio – female vocals
