= Chaos Born =

Studio album by Catamenia
- Released: May 26, 2003
- Studio: Neo-Studios
- Genres: Melodic black metal, melodic death metal
- Length: 46:14
- Label: Massacre
- Producers: Kakke Vähäkuopus; Immu Ilmarinen; Catamenia

Catamenia chronology
Eskhata (2002)	Chaos Born (2003)	Winternight Tragedies (2005)

Chaos Born is the fifth full-length album by the Finnish melodic black metal band Catamenia. It was released on May 26, 2003, through Massacre Records.

== Reception ==
The album received a very good review, 9 out of 10, from Metal.de, compared to 7 out of 10 from Rock Hard.

Powermetal.de stated that the music was "yet another iteration of their tried-and-tested formula", but also that "the Finns consistently demonstrate that they know how to deliver solid melodic black metal". Norway's Scream Magazine gave a rating of 4 out of 6, stating that the predictability of the music made Chaos Born into a "dust collector". Another Norwegian magazine Exact gave the same score, stating that the band trod along a beaten path, making predictable music.

In Finland, Imperiumi posted two reviews of Chaos Born; one rating it as 6 out of 10 and the other 9. The more negative reviewer was admittedly "not a fan of black metal", whereas the positive reviewer praised Catamenia for making "the soundscape incomprehensibly enchanting" and having good lyrics. "As a final note, let me say that the band's unfounded critics could keep their mouths shut with this album or just go to hell", the review ended.

== Track listing ==
1. "Kuolon Tanssi" − 4:35
2. "Calm Before the Storm" − 5:49
3. "The Fallen Angel Pt. I (Astaroth & Astarte)" − 5:38
4. "The Fear's Shadow" − 4:33
5. "Mirrorized Thoughts" − 4:26
6. "Lost in Bitterness" − 5:56
7. "The Era" − 1:57
8. "The Fallen Angel Pt. II (The Rising)" − 4:29
9. "One with Sorrow" − 4:53
10. "Hollow Out − ChaosBorn" − 3:58

== Credits ==
- Mika Tönning − vocals
- Riku Hopeakoski − lead guitar
- Ari Nissilä − rhythm guitar
- Timo Lehtinen − bass guitar
- Veikko Jumisko − drums
- Tero Nevala − keyboards
- Kakke Vähäkuopus − clean male vocals on tracks 5 and 6
- Essi − Female vocals on tracks 3, 4 and 6
