= The Rewritten Chapters =

2012 metal album

Studio album by Catamenia
- Released: 2012
- Genre: Melodic black metal
- Length: 62:04
- Label: Massacre Records

Catamenia chronology
Cavalcade (2010)	The Rewritten Chapters (2012)

The Rewritten Chapters is the tenth full-length album by the Finnish melodic black metal band Catamenia. It was released in 2012 on Massacre Records.

The Rewritten Chapters conists of re-recordings of older Catamenia songs by the then-lineup of Catamenia. The re-recording was motivated by the band's lineup having changed significantly over the years. Riku Hopeakoski was the only remaining member.

== Reception ==
Metal.de received the new album as "a successful cross-section of the Finnish band's work". It was however not a necessary purchase for those who already owned Catamenia's albums, since the re-recorded versions differed little from the originals, only in subtle details. The album could be purchased "as an introduction or as a compilation". In Finland, Kaaoszine bestowed 7 out of 10 points on The Rewritten Chapters. Likewise, the reviewer thought the song selection represented Catamenia well. The songs were as catchy as in their original iterations, but the reviewer had "expected greater differences from the previous versions". The reviewer was also unhappy with the choice of a Bon Jovi cover to round out the album; "a pretty banal song, even by Bon Jovi's standards".

The reviewer in Heavymetal.dk enjoyed the Bon Jovi cover, standing in "extremely screeching contrast to the original". It sounded cool and made the reviewer smile. The rest of the album was also outstanding and was given 9 out of 10 points.

== Track listing ==
1. "Hollow Out - Chaos Born" – 3:28
2. "Blackmension" – 3:37
3. "Alive... Cold... Dead!" – 3:46
4. "Cavalcade" – 4:19
5. "Passing Moment of Twilight Time" – 2:42
6. "The Day When the Sun Faded Away" – 4:54
7. "My Blood Stained Path" – 4:42
8. "Post Mortem" – 4:14
9. "Morning Crimson" – 3:29
10. "Eskhata" – 4:31
11. "Coldbound" – 5:01
12. "Lost in Bitterness" – 5:21
13. "Pimeä yö" – 3:51
14. "Kuolon tanssi" – 4:20
15. "Born to Be My Baby" (Bon Jovi cover) – 3:49
