= Dawn of Relic =

Finnish black metal band

- Origin: Oulu, Finland
- Genre: Black metal
- Years active: 1993–2005, 2009
- Labels: Wicked World/Earache Records, Season of Mist
- Members: Ville Lind; Rami Keränen; Sampo Heikkinen; Jukka Juntunen
- Past members: Teemu Luukinen; Matti; Pekka Malo; Mika Tönning; Pekka Mustonen

Dawn of Relic was a Finnish black metal band.

== History ==
The band was formed by Jukka Juntunen in 1993 in Oulu, Finland. They released their first full-length album, One Night in Carcosa, in 1999, on Wicked World Records (a.k.a. Earache Records). This album featured session vocalists Nazgul (ex-Horna, Satanic Warmaster) and Mika Tönning (ex-Catamenia).

The next album, Lovecraftian Dark, was released in 2003 on Season of Mist. The title refers to weird fiction author H. P. Lovecraft, whose work influenced many of their songs. This influence is also present on One Night in Carcosa. Their latest release was in 2005, with the album Night on Earth. Vocals on this album were performed by Kai "K.J. Khaos" Jaakkola (Deathbound, Deathchain, The Duskfall).

Drummer Jukka Juntunen wrote most of the songs and all the lyrics for Dawn of Relic.

The band did not perform after November 2005 because of line-up problems. Juntunen concentrated on his other band, Valucian (formed in 2002), which consists of some former members of Dawn of Relic. The band became active again in 2009 to perform at the Jalometalli festival in the summer. The new line-up consisted of Rami Keränen, Sampo Heikkinen (Loopwork, Dark Flood) and Ville Lind (Cryptid, Seith).

== Members ==
=== Current ===
- Rami Keränen – guitars (2009–present)
- Sampo Heikkinen – keyboards (2009–present)
- Ville Lind – vocals (2009–present)
- Zann Path – drums (1993–2005; 2009–present), keyboards (1993–1999)

=== Former ===
- Jarno Juntunen – vocals, bass guitar (1993–present)
- Matti (surname unknown) – bass guitar
- Pekka Malo – keyboards (1997–2002)
- Pekka Mustonen – bass guitar, guitar (1994–2004)
- Mika Tönning – vocals (1998–2005)
- Teemu Luukinen – guitars

== Discography ==
- 1999: One Night in Carcosa (Wicked World/Earache)
- 2003: Lovecraftian Dark (Season of Mist)
- 2005: Night on Earth (Season of Mist)
