= For the Revolution =

Studio album by Kalmah
- Released: 23 April 2008
- Studio: Tico Tico studios, Kemi, Finland
- Genre: Melodic death metal; power metal
- Length: 43:58
- Label: Spinefarm
- Producer: Ahti Kortelainen

Kalmah chronology
The Black Waltz (2006)	For the Revolution (2008)	12 Gauge (2010)

For the Revolution is the fifth studio album by the Finnish melodic death metal band Kalmah. It reached number 17 on the Finnish national album chart.

The cover artwork was designed by Vesa Ranta.

The album received reviews such as 5 out of 10 from Metal.de and 6 out of 10 from Rock Hard.

== Track listing ==
No.	Title	Length
1.	"For the Revolution"	5:07
2.	"Dead Man's Shadow"	5:01
3.	"Holy Symphony of War"	4:45
4.	"Wings of Blackening"	5:01
5.	"Ready for Salvation"	4:27
6.	"Towards the Sky"	5:09
7.	"Outremer"	4:40
8.	"Coward"	5:08
9.	"Like a Slave"	4:41

Japanese/UK edition bonus track
No.	Title	Length
10.	"Arise" (Sepultura cover)	2:54
