= Seventh Swamphony =

Studio album by Kalmah
- Released: 17 June 2013
- Recorded: 2012
- Studio: Tico-Tico Studios, Finland
- Genre: Melodic death metal; power metal
- Length: 41:14
- Label: Spinefarm
- Producer: Kalmah

Kalmah chronology
12 Gauge (2010)	Seventh Swamphony (2013)	Palo (2018)

Seventh Swamphony is the seventh studio album by the Finnish melodic death metal band Kalmah, released on 17 June 2013. This is their first album with new keyboardist Veli-Matti Kananen. The album was recorded at Tico-Tico Studios in Kemi, Finland, and was mixed and mastered by Jens Bogren.

== Track listing ==
Seventh Swamphony track listing
No.	Title	Length
1.	"Seventh Swamphony"	5:10
2.	"Deadfall"	3:51
3.	"Pikemaster"	5:03
4.	"Hollo"	7:20
5.	"Windlake Tale"	4:28
6.	"Wolves on the Throne"	4:35
7.	"Black Marten's Trace"	4:45
8.	"The Trapper"	6:02

Japanese edition bonus track
No.	Title	Length
9.	"Cold Gin (Kiss cover)"	4:42

== Personnel ==
Band

- Pekka Kokko − vocals, rhythm guitar, lead guitar on the track "The Trapper"
- Antti Kokko − lead guitar
- Veli Matti Kananen − keyboard
- Janne Kusmin − drum
- Timo Lehtinen − bass guitar

Production

- Jens Bogren – mastering, mixing
- Kalmah – arranger, producer
- Juha Vuorma – cover art

== Release history ==
Region	Date	Label	Format
United States	17 June 2013	Spinefarm	CD
