= Palo (album) =

Studio album by Kalmah
- Released: 6 April 2018
- Recorded: 2017
- Studio: Tico-Tico Studios, Finland
- Genre: Melodic death metal; power metal
- Length: 46:11
- Label: Spinefarm

Kalmah chronology
Seventh Swamphony (2013)	Palo (2018)	Kalmah (2023)

Singles from Palo
- 1. "The Evil Kin" Released: 10 February 2018; 2. "Blood Ran Cold" Released: 6 April 2018; 3. "Take Me Away" Released: 30 August 2018

Palo is the eighth studio album by the Finnish melodic death metal band Kalmah, released on 6 April 2018. The album was recorded at Tico-Tico Studios in Kemi, Finland, and was mixed by Ahti Kortelainen and mastered by Svante Forsbäck (Rammstein, Volbeat, Apocalyptica).

== Track listing ==
No.	Title	Length
1.	"Blood Ran Cold"	5:10
2.	"The Evil Kin"	4:15
3.	"The World of Rage"	4:30
4.	"Into the Black Marsh"	4:20
5.	"Take Me Away"	4:48
6.	"Paystreak"	4:55
7.	"Waiting in the Wings"	4:20
8.	"Through the Shallow Waters"	4:24
9.	"Erase and Diverge"	4:12
10.	"The Stalker"	5:17

== Personnel ==
Kalmah

- Pekka Kokko − vocals, rhythm guitar
- Antti Kokko − lead guitar, backing vocals
- Veli Matti Kananen − keyboards, backing vocals
- Janne Kusmin − drums
- Timo Lehtinen − bass guitar

Production

- Ahti Kortelainen – mixing
- Svante Forsbäck – mastering
- Niklas Sundin – cover art
