= Swampsong =

Studio album by Kalmah
- Released: 23 May 2003
- Recorded: February 2003 at Tico-Tico Studios in Kemi, Finland
- Genre: Melodic death metal; power metal
- Length: 44:07
- Label: Spinefarm
- Producer: Ahti Kortelainen

Kalmah chronology
They Will Return (2002)	Swampsong (2003)	The Black Waltz (2006)

Swampsong is the third studio album by the Finnish melodic death metal band Kalmah. This is the last album with Pasi Hiltula on keyboards.

Professional ratings
Review scores
Source	Rating
BW&BK	(7.5/10)
Punknews	4.5/5 stars
Blabbermouth	8/10 stars
Metal Storm	9/10 stars
Metal.de	8/10 stars
Sea of Tranquility	3.5/5 stars
Metalcrypt	5/5 stars

== Track listing ==
All lyrics are written by Pekka Kokko.

No.	Title	Music	Length
1.	"Heroes to Us"	A. Kokko	5:10
2.	"Burbot's Revenge"	A. Kokko	4:23
3.	"Cloned Insanity"	P. Kokko, A. Kokko, P. Hiltula	4:11
4.	"The Third, the Magical"	P. Hiltula, A. Kokko P. Kokko	5:26
5.	"Bird of Ill Omen"	A. Kokko	4:49
6.	"Doubtful About It All"	A. Kokko	4:45
7.	"Tordah"	A. Kokko, P. Hiltula, T. Lehtinen	4:03
8.	"Man with Mystery"	P. Kokko	4:48
9.	"Moon of My Nights"	A. Kokko, P. Kokko	6:12
Total length:			44:07

Japanese edition bonus track
No.	Title	Length
10.	"Suodeth"	4:48
Total length:		48:55

== Credits ==
=== Band members ===
- Pekka Kokko − guitar, vocals
- Antti Kokko − guitar
- Pasi Hiltula − keyboard
- Timo Lehtinen − bass
- Janne Kusmin − drums

=== Production ===
- Recorded by Ahti Kortelainen at Tico-Tico Studios, Kemi, in February 2003
- Mixed by Mikko Karmila at Finnvox Studios in March 2003
- Mastered by Mika Jussila at Finnvox Studios in March 2003
