= They Will Return =

Studio album by Kalmah
- Released: 30 April 2002
- Recorded: November 2001
- Studio: Tico-Tico Studio
- Genre: Melodic death metal; power metal
- Length: 41:35
- Label: Spinefarm
- Producer: Ahti Kortelainen

Kalmah chronology
Swamplord (2000)	They Will Return (2002)	Swampsong (2003)

Professional ratings
Review scores
Source	Rating
AllMusic	4/5 stars

They Will Return is the second studio album by the Finnish melodic death metal band Kalmah. It was released by Spinefarm Records on 30 April 2002. This is the first studio album to feature bassist Timo Lehtinen and drummer Janne Kusmin.

== Track listing ==
No.	Title	Writer(s)	Length
1.	"Hollow Heart"	P. Kokko, A. Kokko	4:44
2.	"Swamphell"	P. Kokko, A. Kokko	4:52
3.	"Principle Hero"	P. Kokko, A. Kokko, Pasi Hiltula	4:24
4.	"Human Fates"	P. Kokko, A. Kokko, Hiltula, Timo Lehtinen	5:50
5.	"They Will Return"	P. Kokko, A. Kokko	3:53
6.	"Kill the Idealist"	P. Kokko, A. Kokko, Hiltula	5:13
7.	"The Blind Leader"	P. Kokko, A. Kokko	4:05
8.	"My Nation"	P. Kokko, A. Kokko, Hiltula	5:30
9.	"Skin o' My Teeth" (Megadeth cover)	D. Mustaine	3:00

== Personnel ==
- Pekka Kokko − rhythm guitar, lead guitar and vocals
- Antti Kokko − lead guitar
- Timo Lehtinen − bass
- Pasi Hiltula − keyboard
- Janne Kusmin − drums

=== Production ===
- Produced and engineered by Ahti Kortelainen
- Mastered by Mika Jussila
