= Cavalcade (Catamenia album) =

Studio album by Catamenia
- Released: February 26, 2010
- Recorded: December 2009
- Studio: Masterworks Studio in Oulu
- Genre: Melodic death metal
- Label: Massacre Records
- Producer: Catamenia

Catamenia chronology
VIII - The Time Unchained (2008)	Cavalcade (2010)	The Rewritten Chapters (2012)

Cavalcade is the ninth full-length album by the Finnish melodic black metal band Catamenia. It was released on February 26, 2010, via Massacre Records.

== Reception ==
Powermetal.de welcomed Catamenia's shedding of most of its black metal roots; the shift was "long overdue" and earned Cavalcade a rating of 8.5 out of 10. The reviewer concluded that "Catamenia belong to the pinnacle of Finnish metal".

Rock Hard and Metal.de both gave ratings of 7 out of 10, with the latter stating that Cavalcade was rather similar to thee style of In Flames. The same score was given by Heavymetal.dk too, whose reviewer stated that old fans of the band might have preferred if Catamenia kept more of the black metal elements.

In Finland, Noise.fi gave a slightly lower grade, 3 out of 5. While "Cavalcade is a pleasure to listen to", the band was "not about breaking any boundaries", and had never had a substantial breakthrough in the metal scene. Similarly, Imperiumi gave a 6- score out of 10. Cavalcade was better than their previous album, but still had weaknesses, and would probably not contribute to the band "gaining the kind of popularity, at least in their home country, that such long-standing domestic names tend to gain". Vampster opined that the many lineup changes had rendered the band unsure of its musical direction. Cavalcade was "Nice, well-played, well-produced, but somehow lacking in real highlights". The band's output was "nice, but ultimately rather dispensable", "simply not truly inspiring". On another note, it seeemed as the band had "finally grown tired of" adorning their album cover with a wolf; alas, the cover art for Cavalcade was "completely bland".

== Track listing ==
All tracks are written by Catamenia.

No.	Title	Length
1.	"Blood Trails" (feat. Ville Laihiala of Poisonblack)	4:59
2.	"Cavalcade"	4:59
3.	"The Path That Lies Behind Me"	4:20
4.	"Silence"	4:29
5.	"Quantity of Sadness"	4:29
6.	"Post Mortem"	4:27
7.	"The Vulture's Feast"	5:15
8.	"A Callous Mind"	4:06
9.	"Reincarnation"	5:23
10.	"Angry Again" (Megadeth cover)	3:36
11.	"Farewell" (digipack bonus track; Sentenced cover)	3:38

== Credits ==
- Ari Nissilä – harsh vocals, rhythm guitars
- Kari Vähäkuopus – clean vocals, rhythm guitars
- Riku Hopeakoski – lead guitars, backing vocals
- Toni Kansanoja – bass, low grunts
- Mikko Nevanlahti – drums
- Ville Laihiala - guest clean vocals on "Blood Trails"
