= Lovecraftian Dark =

Studio album by Dawn of Relic
- Released: 2003
- Genre: Black metal>
- Length: 58:11
- Label: Season of Mist

Dawn of Relic chronology
One Night in Carcosa (1999)	Lovecraftian Dark (2003)	Night on Earth (2005)

Professional ratings
Review scores
Source	Rating
Metal Reviews	86/100
Rock Hard	8/10

Lovecraftian Dark is the second album by black metal band Dawn of Relic, released in 2003.

== Track listing ==
Chapter I — Throes Matrix

1. "Dawn over Carcosa" - 02:07
2. "Masquerade of Sickness (The Eve of Reckoning)" - 04:38
3. "Throes Matrix" - 03:15
4. "Phosphor" - 03:53
5. "Scions of the Blackened Soil" - 04:16
6. "Wrathcast" - 03:54
7. "Watchtower Son (Lemurian Guard)" - 04:28

Chapter II — Themes of Stifled Screams

8. "The Awakening" - 05:16
9. "Bowels of Murder" - 03:09
10. "The Wail of the Tartarean Wells" - 06:42
11. "It Dragged Her to Dark..." - 05:02

Chapter III — The Story of Rose Haven (unreleased demo-material)

12. "Snowfall" - 03:22
13. "Dormant from Kiasmagoria" - 03:33
14. "Phantasm and Evenfall" - 04:36
