= Swamplord =

Studio album by Kalmah
- Released: November 2000
- Recorded: September 2000, Tico-Tico Studios, Kemi, Finland
- Genres: Melodic death metal; power metal
- Length: 36:12
- Labels: Spinefarm, Century Media
- Producers: Ahti Kortelainen, Kalmah

Kalmah chronology
Svieri Obraza (1999)	Swamplord (2000)	They Will Return (2002)

Swamplord is the debut studio album by the Finnish melodic death metal band Kalmah.

== Critical reception ==
Professional ratings
Review scores
Source	Rating
Allmusic	3/5 stars
BW&BK	7/10 stars
Metal.de	8/10 stars
MetalCrypt	4.5/5 stars

Reception of Swamplord was fairly positive. Andy Hinds of AllMusic praised the album and in particular, the keyboards on the album, stating they "heighten the drama, while adding texture to the quintet's crushing twin-guitar foundation." He also compared the vocals to that of At the Gates and Emperor. Mark Gromen for Brave Words & Bloody Knuckles called the tracks on the album "Rapidly played hymns of blasphemy, with a high level of musicianship." Kevin Stewart-Panko of Exclaim! stated that "The classical influenced runs and keyboard swells are a nice touch as are the band's experiments with dissonance vs. consonance in 'Heritance of Berija.'" He also said that while the band isn't entirely original, "they do have their moments and provide a decent enough listen."

== Track listing ==
No.	Title	Length
1.	"Evil in You"	5:08
2.	"Withering Away"	3:34
3.	"Heritance of Berija"	4:30
4.	"Black Roija"	4:15
5.	"Dance of the Water"	4:31
6.	"Hades"	4:25
7.	"Alteration"	4:42
8.	"Using the Word"	5:07

Japanese edition bonus tracks
No.	Title	Length
9.	"The Blind Leader (Demo)"	3:12
10.	"Vezidoroga"	3:49

== Credits ==
=== Band members ===
- Antti Kokko − guitar
- Pekka Kokko − guitar, vocals
- Altti Veteläinen − bass
- Pasi Hiltula − keyboards
- Petri Sankala − drums

=== Production ===
- Recorded and mixed at Tico-Tico Studios, Kemi, in September 2000
- Produced by Kalmah and Ahti Kortelainen
- Mastered at Finnvox Studios by Mika Jussila
