= Kalmah (album) =

Studio album by Kalmah
- Released: 26 May 2023
- Recorded: 2022–2023
- Studio: Tico-Tico Studios, Finland
- Genre: Melodic death metal; power metal
- Length: 43:54
- Label: Ranka Kustannus

Kalmah chronology
Palo (2018)	Kalmah (2023)

Singles from Kalmah
- 1. "Haunted by Guilt" Released: 28 February 2023; 2. "Drifting in a Dream" Released: 24 March 2023

Kalmah is the self-titled ninth studio album by the Finnish melodic death metal band Kalmah, released on 26 May 2023. The band performed several shows for the album in March and April 2023, in advance of its release.

== Track listing ==
Kalmah track listing
No.	Title	Length
1.	"Haunted by Guilt"	3:45
2.	"Veil of Sin"	3:48
3.	"Scarred by Sadness"	3:48
4.	"No Words Sad Enough"	4:32
5.	"Serve the Untrue"	4:48
6.	"Home Sweet Hell"	4:18
7.	"Tons of Chaos"	4:04
8.	"Red and Black"	5:31
9.	"Taken Before Given"	3:54
10.	"Drifting in a Dream"	5:25

Japanese edition bonus track
No.	Title	Length
11.	"Silent Sorrow"	4:42

== Personnel ==
Band

- Pekka Kokko − vocals, rhythm guitar
- Antti Kokko − lead guitar, backing vocals
- Veli Matti Kananen − keyboards, orchestrations
- Janne Kusmin − drums
- Timo Lehtinen − bass guitar

Production

- Ahti Kortelainen – recording
- Mikko Karmila – mixing
- Mika Jussila – mastering
- Niklas Sundin – cover art

== Charts ==
Chart performance for Kalmah
Chart (2023)	Peak position
Finnish Albums (Suomen virallinen lista)	4
