= Indian Nightmare =

German metal band

Indian Nightmare is a punk and speed metal band. They have released two albums and one EP, two of which on High Roller Records.

Based in Germany, the members are immigrants from Italy, Turkey, Mexico and Indonesia.

== Select discography ==
- Taking Back the Land (2016)
- By Ancient Force (2019)
- Banished into Endless Chaos (EP, 2025)
