= Sintage =

German metal band

Sintage is a German heavy metal band. They have released two albums, both on High Roller Records.

The band hails from Leipzig.

== Discography ==
- Paralyzing Chains (2023)
- Unbound Triumph (2025)
