= The Black Waltz =

Studio album by Kalmah
- Released: 22 February 2006
- Recorded: November 2005
- Studio: Tico-Tico studios (Kemi, Finland)
- Genre: Melodic death metal; power metal
- Length: 47:24
- Label: Spinefarm
- Producer: Kalmah

Kalmah chronology
Swampsong (2003)	The Black Waltz (2006)	For the Revolution (2008)

The Black Waltz is the fourth studio album by the Finnish melodic death metal band Kalmah and their first with keyboard player Marco Sneck. This album has them gravitating more towards thrash metal, which has often been cited as the Kokko brothers' primary musical influence. The vocals have changed to lower death vocals, compared to their higher pitched growls in previous albums.

The instrumental "Svieri Doroga" is a combination of the name of their first demo Svieri Obraza and a track on that demo entitled "Vezi Doroga". The name of the title track and album comes from a song originally recorded ten years earlier when the band was still named "Ancestor".

The video for "The Groan of Wind" shows the band members playing inside a cave, with alternating shots of a young boy and girl running from their possessed family members. They are later rescued by a disfigured old man, the Swamplord (Odin), whose picture is on the cover of the album.

The album ranked in the top three melodic death metal/Gothenburg albums in 2006. It peaked at number 48 on the national Finnish album charts.

Professional ratings
Review scores
Source	Rating
Metal Storm	8/10 stars
Rock Hard	8.5/10 stars
Metal.de	6/10 stars

== Track listing ==
All lyrics are written by Pekka Kokko, except track 10 (P. Kokko and A. Kokko).

No.	Title	Music	Length
1.	"Defeat"	A. Kokko, P. Kokko	5:32
2.	"Bitter Metallic Side"	A. Kokko	4:27
3.	"Time Takes Us All"	M. Sneck	4:22
4.	"To the Gallows"	P. Kokko	4:40
5.	"Svieri Doroga"	A. Kokko	1:08
6.	"The Black Waltz"	A. Kokko	4:37
7.	"With Terminal Intensity"	M. Sneck	4:56
8.	"Man of the King"	A. Kokko, P.Kokko, Lehtinen	4:02
9.	"The Groan of Wind"	A. Kokko, P. Kokko	5:02
10.	"Mindrust"	M. Sneck	4:06
11.	"One from the Stands"	A. Kokko, P. Kokko	4:32

Japanese edition bonus track
No.	Title	Length
12.	"This Mortal Coil" (Carcass cover)	3:36

== Credits ==
=== Band members ===
- Pekka Kokko − guitars, vocals
- Antti Kokko − guitars
- Marco Sneck − keyboard
- Timo Lehtinen − bass
- Janne Kusmin − drums

=== Production and other ===
- All guitar solos performed by Antti Kokko
- Choirs on "Defeat" and "To The Gallows" performed by The Official Kalmah Pig Unit
- Recorded and mixed at Tico-Tico studios in November 2005 by Ahti Kortelainen
- Mastered at Finnvox studios in December 2005 by Mika Jussila
- All music arranged and produced by Kalmah
- Cover artwork, layout and photography by Vesa Ranta
