= Kalmah =

Finnish melodic death metal band

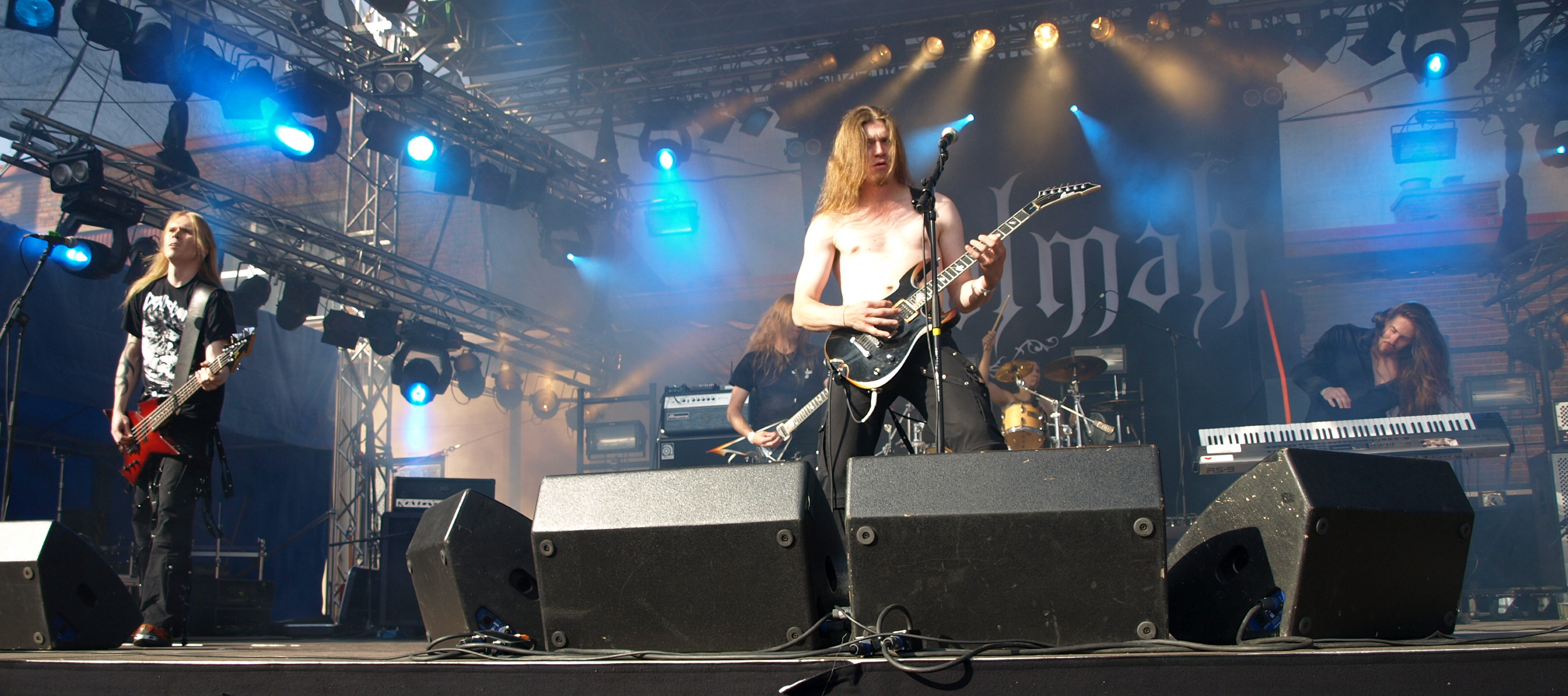
- Kalmah performing at Jalometalli Metal Music Festival in 2008

Background information
- Also known as: Ancestor (1991–1998)
- Origin: Pudasjärvi, Finland
- Genres: Melodic death metal; power metal
- Years active: 1991–present
- Labels: Spinefarm, Century Media
- Members: Pekka Kokko; Antti Kokko; Timo Lehtinen; Janne Kusmin; Veli-Matti Kananen
- Past members: Altti Veteläinen; Petri Sankala; Pasi Hiltula; Anssi Seppänen; Marco Sneck
- Website: kalmah.com

Kalmah is a Finnish melodic death metal band from Pudasjärvi formed in 1998. Less than a year after its formation, Kalmah signed to Spinefarm Records. The word "kalmah" is Karelian and could be translated as "to the grave" or "to the death".

== History ==
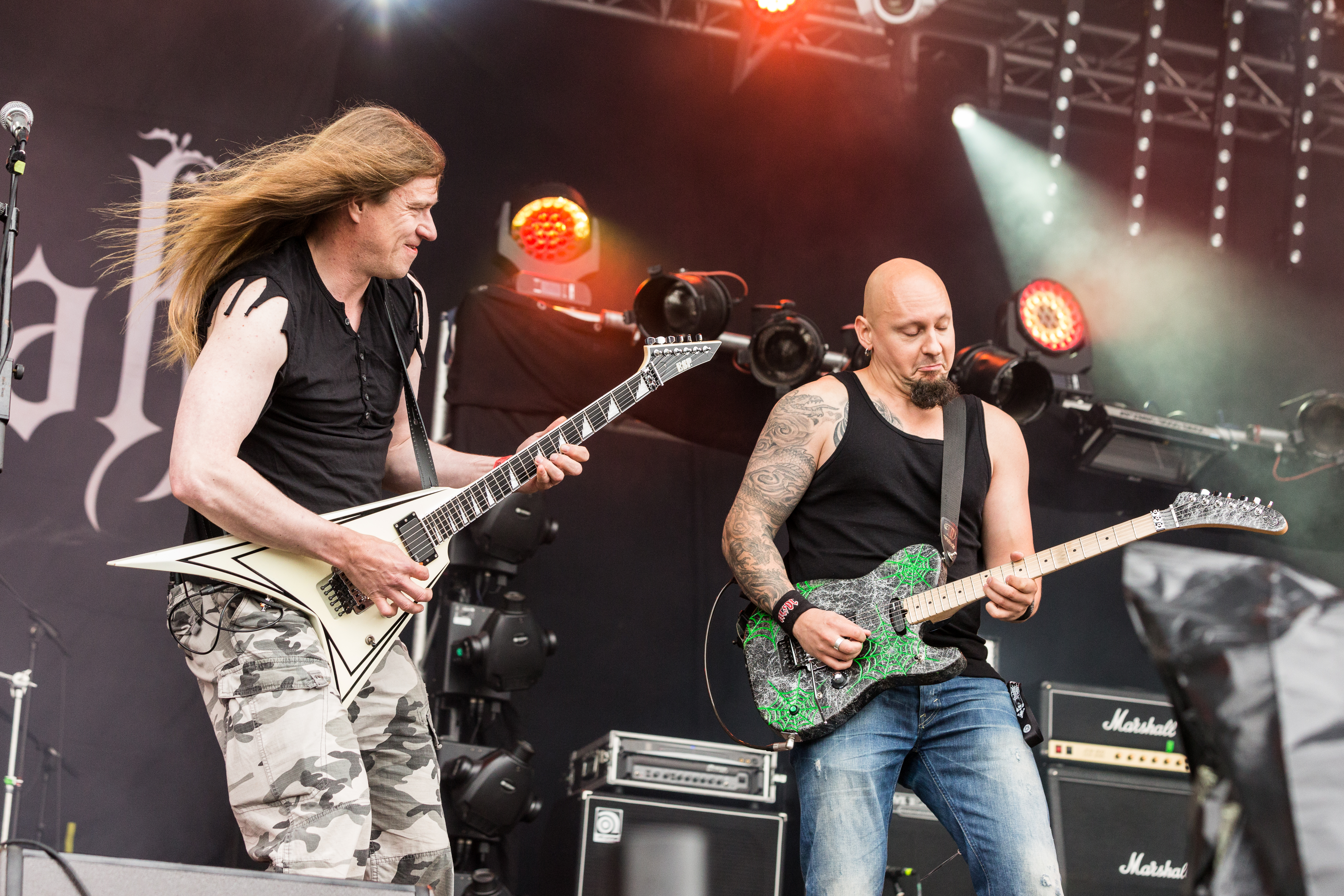
Kalmah at Party.San 2017

In 1991, Pekka Kokko and Petri Sankala founded metal band Ancestor. After Ancestor had recorded two demos, lead guitarist Antti Kokko joined the band. In 1998, after five demos, Ancestor disbanded and Kalmah formed. The new band consisted of Pekka Kokko performing vocals and guitar, Antti Kokko on lead guitar, Pasi Hiltula on keyboards, Altti Veteläinen on bass, and Petri Sankala on drums.

Kalmah wrote songs for the promotional CD Svieri Obraza. With this demo, they signed with Spinefarm Records and headed to Tico-Tico Studios to record their debut album, Swamplord, released in 2000.

By November 2001, they returned to Tico-Tico Studios to record their second studio album, They Will Return. By this time, Veteläinen and Sankala were replaced with bassist Timo Lehtinen and drummer Janne Kusmin, respectively. In 2002, Kalmah played shows in Finland and at Wacken Open Air. In February 2003, they recorded their third studio album, Swampsong. In 2004, keyboardist Pasi Hiltula left and was replaced with Marco Sneck. The band released The Black Waltz in 2006 and For the Revolution in 2008. Kalmah toured Canada and Finland to promote the latter album.

=== 12 Gauge ===
Kalmah's sixth studio album was released in Japan on 24 February 2010, Canada on 2 March, Europe on 3 March and North America on 6 April.

Recording and mixing took place from May to August at Tico-Tico Studios in Finland, and mastering for the disc took place at the Cutting Room in Sweden.

The track "Bullets Are Blind" was released in December 2009 on a two-CD collection included with the 35th anniversary issue of Soundi magazine.

In March 2010, 12 Gauge became the first Kalmah album released on vinyl. The album was mastered for vinyl by Joona Lukala, Noise for Fiction, and released by Svart Records in a limited run of 500 copies.

=== Seventh Swamphony ===
In 2012, Kalmah finished filming a new music video for their upcoming album, to be released in 2013. The band kept fans up to date with their process via Facebook by uploading different photos, as well as a short behind-the-scenes video from the day of filming their video. They announced that they had six songs finished, and they planned to enter the studio in January 2013.

The artwork for their seventh studio album was created by Juha Vuorma, the artist behind the art of Kalmah's first three albums.

In April 2013, it was announced that the band would release their seventh studio album, Seventh Swamphony, on 17 June.

=== Palo ===
Kalmah's eighth album, Palo, was released on 6 April 2018. A single from the album, "Evil Kin", was released on 9 February 2018.

=== Kalmah ===
In March 2023, the band announced their self-titled ninth album would be released on 26 May.

== Musical style ==
Kalmah was described as a melodic death metal and power metal hybrid, similar to bands like Children of Bodom, Norther and Wintersun.

== Band members ==
Current lineup

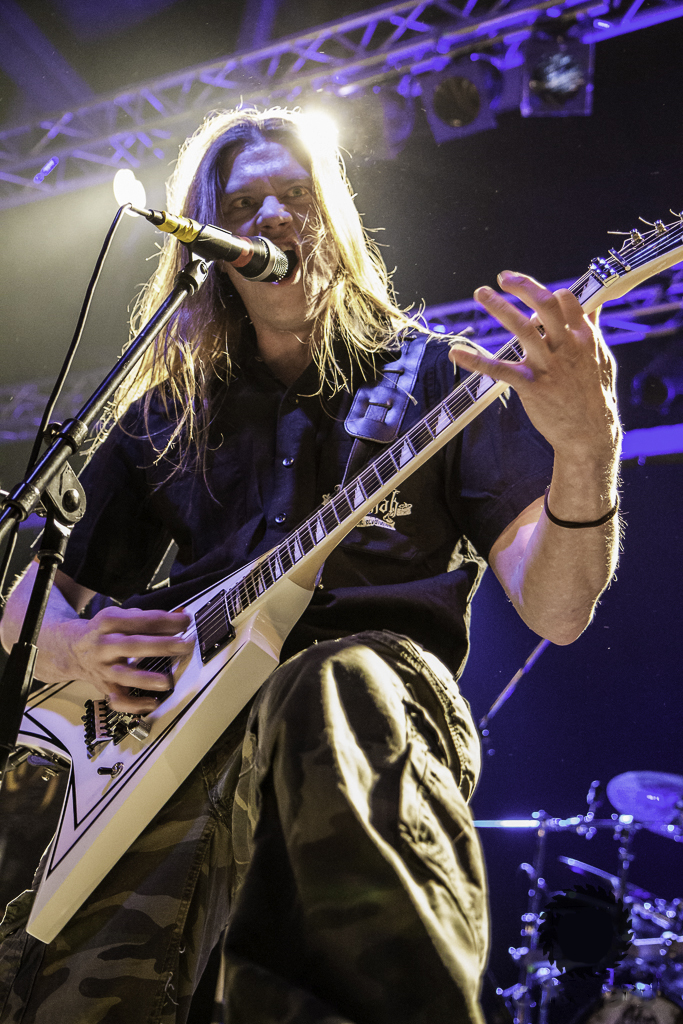
Pekka Kokko

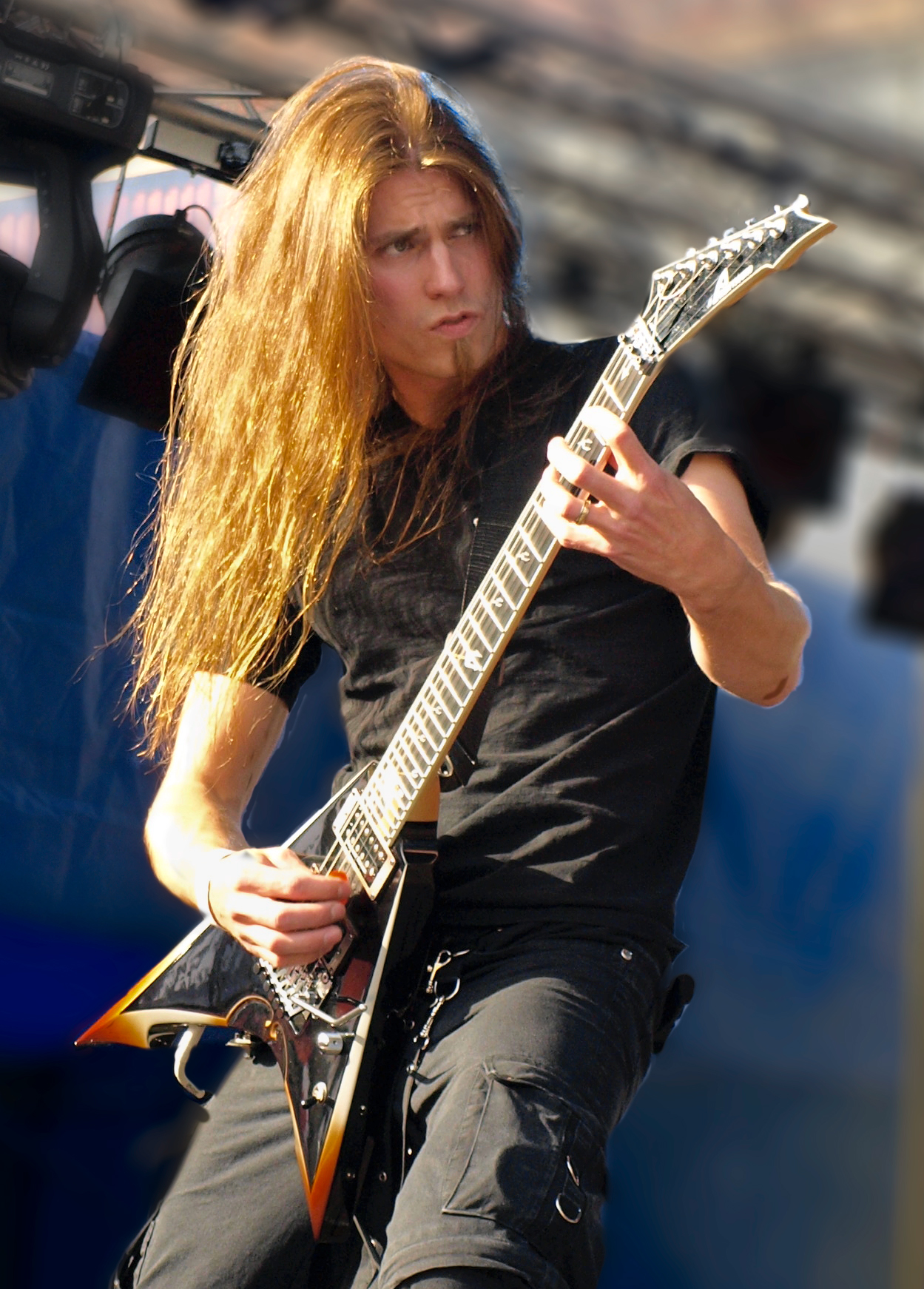
Antti Kokko

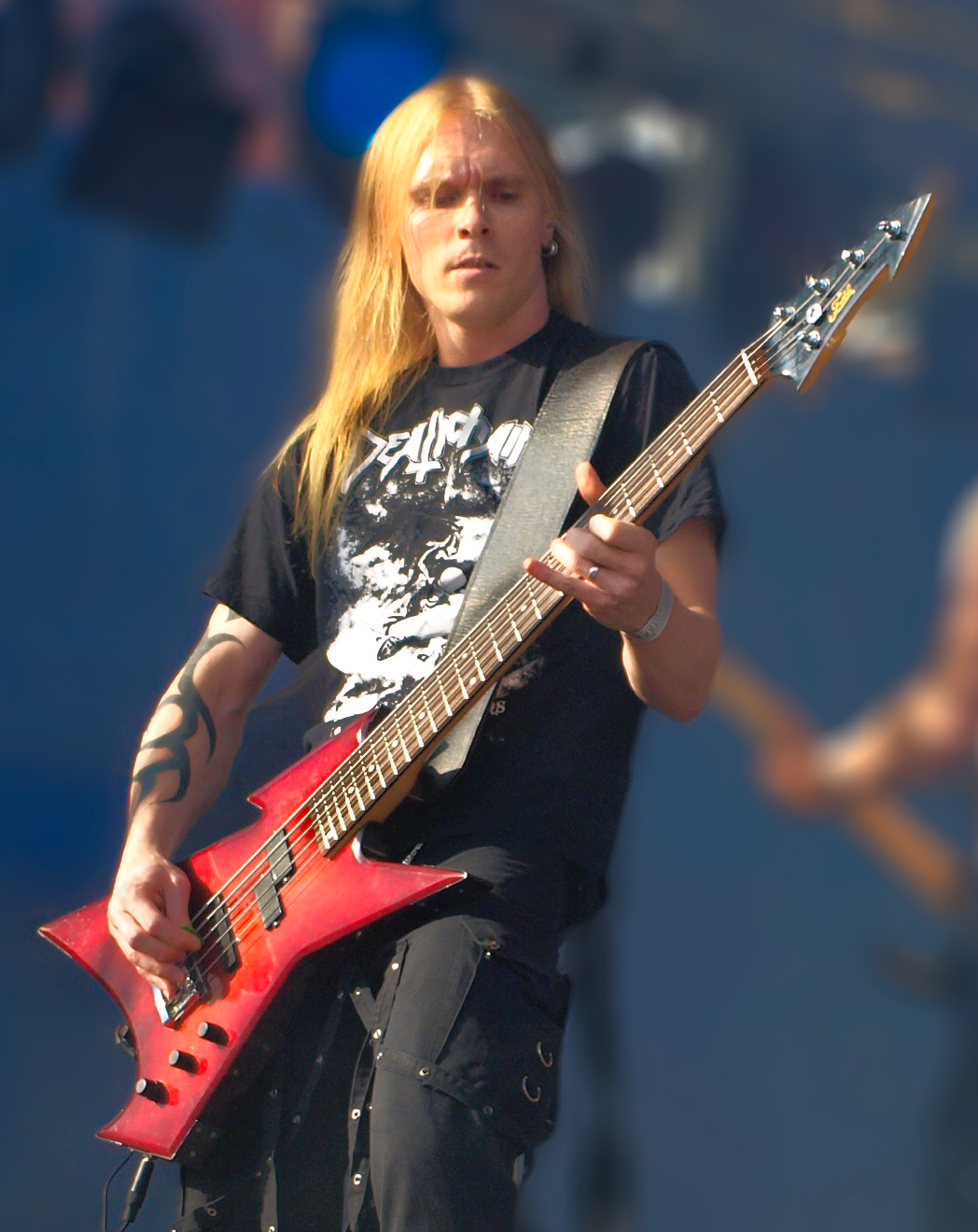
Timo Lehtinen

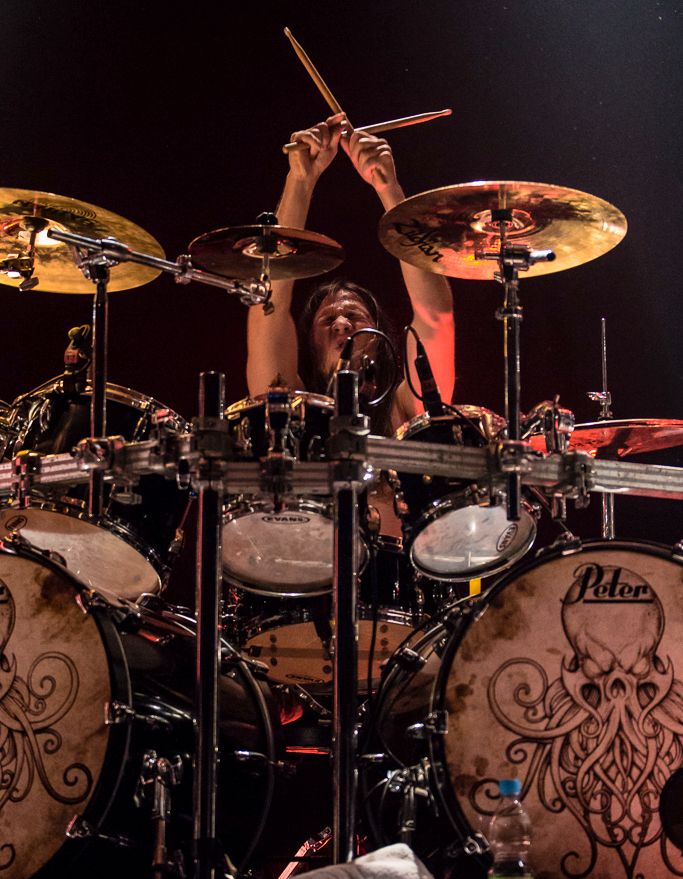
Janne Kusmin

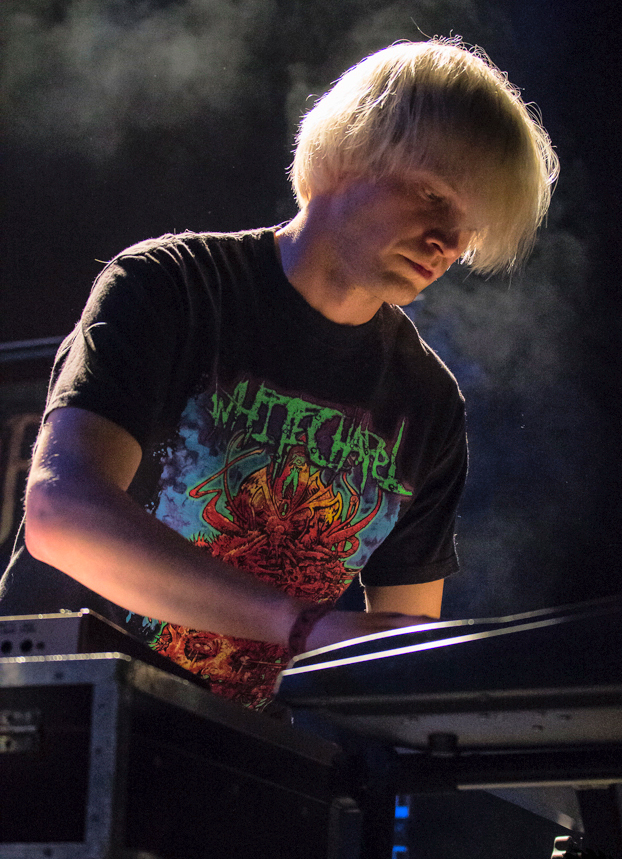
Veli-Matti Kananen

Current

- Pekka Kokko – vocals, rhythm guitar (1998–present)
- Antti Kokko – lead guitar (1998–present)
- Timo Lehtinen – bass (2001–present)
- Janne Kusmin – drums (2001–present)
- Veli-Matti Kananen – keyboards (2012–present)

Former

- Altti Veteläinen – bass guitar (1998–2001)
- Petri Sankala – drums (1998–2001)
- Antti-Matti Talala – keyboards (1999)
- Pasi Hiltula – keyboards (1999–2004)
- Marco Sneck – keyboards (2004–2011)

== Discography ==
Studio albums

- Swamplord (2000)
- They Will Return (2002)
- Swampsong (2003)
- The Black Waltz (2006)
- For the Revolution (2008)
- 12 Gauge (2010)
- Seventh Swamphony (2013)
- Palo (2018)
- Kalmah (2023)

Demos and EPs

As Ancestor

- Ethereal Devotion (1992)
- Material World God (1993)
- With No Strings Attached (1995)
- Tomorrow (1997)
- Under the Burbot's Nest (1998)

As Kalmah

- Svieri Obraza (1999) − promo
- Demo 2004 (2004)

Videos

- Withering Away (2000)
- The Groan of Wind (2006)
- 12 Gauge studio diary in seven parts (2009)
- 12 Gauge (2010) (music video)
- Seventh Swamphony (2013)
- Evil Kin (2018)
- Blood Ran Cold (2018)
- Take Me Away (2018)
