= Scream Magazine (music magazine) =

Norwegian music magazine

Scream Magazine is a Norwegian music magazine that covers heavy metal music, broadly construed.

The magazine was founded by Frode Øien. It had its roots in the fanzines Black Angel from 1984 and later Streetfighter. The first issue was published in November 1990. The magazine grew from a circulation of 1,000 and bimonthly publication, to a circulation of 6,000 and ten annual issues in 2003.

From the start, Øien vowed to avoid writing about neo-Nazis and musicians with "a rotten, racist image". English versions of articles were published online. The paper magazine was distributed by Narvesen from the mid-1990s. Issue #250 came in 2020, when the magazine also turned 30 years of age.
